= 7th House of Representatives (Nepal) =

Legislative chamber session, 2026–

←	6th HoR

Overview
- Legislative body: Federal Parliament of Nepal
- Jurisdiction: Nepal
- Meeting place: Singha Durbar
- Term: 26 March 2026 – Present
- Election: 2026 general elections
- Government: Shah cabinet, 2026
- Website: hr.parliament.gov.np

House of Representatives
- Members: 275
- Speaker: Dol Prasad Aryal, RSP
- Deputy Speaker: Ruby Kumari Thakur, SSP
- Leader of the House: Balen Shah, RSP
- Leader of the Opposition: Bhishma Raj Angdembe, Congress
- Party control: RSP (182); Congress (38); CPN (UML) (25); NCP (17); Shram Sanskriti (7); RPP (5); Independent (1)

Sessions
- 1st: 2 April 2026 – 10 April 2026
- 2nd: 11 May 2026 – 2 October 2026

The 7th House of Representatives is the current meeting of the lower chamber of the Federal Parliament of Nepal, the House of Representatives. Members took their oath of office on 26 March 2026, following the general election held on 5 March 2026.

== Parliamentary term ==
The final results of the election were presented to the president on 20 March 2026 by the Election Commission.

The oldest member of the House of Representatives, Arjun Narasingha K. C., was administered the oath of office and secrecy on 25 March, following which K. C. administered the oath to the remaining members.

A joint session of the Federal Parliament was called for 2 April 2026 by the president on the recommendation of the cabinet.

On 5 April 2026, Dol Prasad Aryal from Rastriya Swatantra Party was elected unopposed as the Speaker. Ruby Kumari Thakur from Shram Sanskriti Party was elected as the deputy speaker.

== Officeholders ==
=== Presiding officers ===
- Speaker: Rt. Hon. Dol Prasad Aryal, Rastriya Swatantra Party
  - Deputy Speaker: Hon. Ruby Kumari Thakur, Shram Sanskriti Party

=== Parliamentary Party Leaders ===
- Leader of the House (Prime Minister): Rt. Hon. Balen Shah (Rastriya Swatantra Party)
  - Deputy Parliamentary Party Leader of the Rastriya Swatantra Party: Hon. Ganesh Parajuli
- Leader of the Opposition: Hon. Bhishma Raj Angdembe (Nepali Congress)
  - Deputy Parliamentary Party Leader of the Nepali Congress: Hon. Abhishek Pratap Shah
- Parliamentary Party Leader of the CPN (Unified Marxist–Leninist): Hon. Ram Bahadur Thapa
  - Deputy Parliamentary Party Leader of the CPN (Unified Marxist–Leninist): Hon. Padma Kumari Aryal
- Parliamentary Party Leader of the Nepali Communist Party: Hon. Pushpa Kamal Dahal
- Parliamentary Party Leader of the Shram Sanskriti Party: Hon. Harka Sampang
- Parliamentary Party Leader of the Rastriya Prajatantra Party: Hon. Gyan Bahadur Shahi

=== Whips ===
- Chief Whip of the Rastriya Swatantra Party: Hon. Kabindra Burlakoti
  - Whip of the Rastriya Swatantra Party
    - Hon. Krantishikha Dhital
    - Hon. Prakash Chandra Pariyar
- Chief Whip of the Nepali Congress: Hon. Basana Thapa
  - Whip of the Nepali Congres: Hon. Nishkal Rai
- Chief Whip of the CPN (Unified Marxist–Leninist): Ain Bahadur Mahar
- Chief Whip of the Nepali Communist Party: Hon. Yubaraj Dulal

== Members of the House of Representatives ==
7th House of Representatives

After the 2026 general election

=== Overview ===
Party	Total seats		
Party	After election		
Party	FPTP	PR	Total
Parliamentary parties
Rastriya Swatantra Party	125	57	182
Nepali Congress	18	20	38
CPN (UML)	9	16	25
Nepali Communist Party	8	9	17
Shram Sanskriti Party	3	4	7
Rastriya Prajatantra Party	1	4	5
Represented as Independents
Independent	1	—	1
Total	165	110	275

=== Members ===
Rastriya Swatantra Party (182)
Constituency/PR group	Member	Portfolio & Responsibilities / Remarks
Officers of the House of Representatives
Kathmandu 9	Dol Prasad Aryal	Speaker of the House of Representatives (from 5 April 2026)
Members of Parliament
Jhapa 5	Balen Shah	Parliamentary Party Leader; Leader of the House; Prime Minister of Nepal (from 27 March 2026)
Kathmandu 7	Ganesh Parajuli	Deputy Parliamentary Party Leader
Gorkha 2	Kabindra Burlakoti	Chief Whip
Khas Arya, Female	Krantishikha Dhital	Whip
Dalit, Male	Prakash Chandra Pariyar	Whip
Arghakhanchi 1	Hari Prasad Bhusal	
Baglung 1	Sushil Khadka	
Baglung 2	Som Sharma	
Baitadi 1	Hari Mohan Bhandari	
Banke 1	Suresh Kumar Chaudhary	
Banke 3	Khagendra Sunar	
Bara 1	Ganesh Dhimal	
Bara 2	Chandan Kumar Singh	
Bara 3	Arvind Sah	
Bara 4	Rahbar Ansari	
Bardiya 1	Thakur Singh Tharu	
Bardiya 2	Shreedhar Pokharel	
Bhaktapur 1	Rukesh Ranjit	
Bhaktapur 2	Rajiv Khatri	
Chitwan 1	Hari Dhakal	
Chitwan 2	Rabi Lamichhane	
Chitwan 3	Sobita Gautam	
Dadeldhura 1	Tara Prasad Joshi	
Dang 1	Devraj Pathak	
Dang 2	Bipin Kumar Acharya	
Dang 3	Kamal Subedi	
Dhading 1	Ashika Tamang	
Dhading 2	Bodh Narayan Shrestha	
Dhanusha 2	Ram Binod Yadav	
Dhanusha 3	Manish Jha	
Dhanusha 4	Raj Kishor Mahato	
Dolakha 1	Jagadish Kharel	
Gorkha 1	Sudan Gurung	
Gulmi 1	Sagar Dhakal	
Gulmi 2	Govinda Panthi	
Jhapa 1	Nisha Dangi	
Jhapa 2	Indira Rana Magar	
Jhapa 3	Prakash Pathak	
Jhapa 4	Shambhu Prasad Dhakal	
Kailali 1	Komal Gyawali	
Kailali 2	K. P. Khanal	
Kailali 3	Jagat Prasad Joshi	
Kailali 4	Khem Raj Koirala	
Kailali 5	Ananda Bahadur Chand	
Kanchanpur 1	Janak Singh Dhami	
Kanchanpur 2	Deepak Raj Bohara	
Kanchanpur 3	Gyanendra Singh Mahata	
Kapilvastu 1	Mohan Lal Acharya	
Kapilvastu 2	Bikram Thapa	
Kaski 1	Khadak Raj Paudel	
Kaski 2	Uttam Paudel	
Kaski 3	Bina Gurung	
Kathmandu 1	Ranju Darshana	
Kathmandu 2	Sunil K.C.	
Kathmandu 3	Rajunath Pandey	
Kathmandu 4	Pukar Bam	
Kathmandu 5	Sasmit Pokharel	
Kathmandu 6	Shishir Khanal	
Kathmandu 8	Biraj Bhakta Shrestha	
Kathmandu 9	Dol Prasad Aryal	
Kathmandu 10	Pradip Bista	
Kavrepalanchok 1	Madhu Kumar Chaulagain	
Kavrepalanchok 2	Badan Kumar Bhandari	
Lalitpur 1	Buddha Ratna Maharjan	
Lalitpur 2	Jagdish Kharel	
Lalitpur 3	Toshima Karki	
Lamjung 1	Dharmaraj K.C.	
Mahottari 1	Pramod Kumar Mahato	
Mahottari 2	Dipak Kumar Sah	
Mahottari 3	Ujjawal Kumar Jha	
Mahottari 4	Gauri Kumari	
Makwanpur 1	Prakash Gautam	
Makwanpur 2	Prashant Upreti	
Morang 1	Yagyamani Neupane	
Morang 2	Krishna Kumar Karki	
Morang 3	Ganesh Karki	
Morang 4	Santosh Rajbanshi	
Morang 5	Asha Jha	
Morang 6	Rubina Acharya	
Nawalpur 1	Rajan Gautam	
Nawalpur 2	Manish Khanal	
Nuwakot 1	Bikram Timilsina	
Nuwakot 2	Achuttam Lamichhane	
Okhaldhunga 1	Bishwaraj Pokharel	
Palpa 2	Madhav Bahadur Thapa	
Parasi 1	Bikram Khanal	
Parasi 2	Narendra Kumar Gupta	
Parbat 1	Sagar Bhusal	
Parsa 1	Buddhi Prasad Pant	
Parsa 2	Sushil Kumar Kanu	
Parsa 3	Ramakant Prasad Chaurasiya	
Parsa 4	Tek Bahadur Shakya	
Pyuthan 1	Sushant Vaidik	
Ramechhap 1	Krishna Hari Budhathoki	
Rautahat 1	Rajesh Kumar Chaudhary	
Rautahat 3	Rabindra Patel	
Rautahat 4	Ganesh Paudel	
Rupandehi 1	Sunil Lamsal	
Rupandehi 2	Sulabh Kharel	
Rupandehi 3	Lekhjung Thapa	
Rupandehi 4	Kanhaiya Baniya	
Rupandehi 5	Taufique Ahmad Khan	
Saptari 1	Pushpa Kumari Chaudhary	
Saptari 2	Ramjee Yadav	
Saptari 3	Amarkant Chaudhary	
Saptari 4	Sitaram Sah	
Sarlahi 1	Nitima Bhandari	
Sarlahi 2	Rabin Mahato	
Sarlahi 3	Narendra Sah Kalwar	
Sarlahi 4	Amresh Kumar Singh	
Sindhuli 1	Dhanendra Karki	
Sindhuli 2	Aashish Gajurel	
Sindhupalchok 1	Bharat Prasad Parajuli	
Siraha 1	Bablu Gupta	
Siraha 2	Shiv Shankar Yadav	
Siraha 3	Shambhu Kumar Yadav	
Siraha 4	Tapeshwar Yadav	
Sunsari 2	Lal Bikram Thapa	
Sunsari 3	Ashok Kumar Chaudhary	
Sunsari 4	Deepak Kumar Sah	
Surkhet 2	Ramesh Kumar Sapkota	
Syangja 1	Dhananjaya Regmi	
Syangja 2	Jhabilal Dumre	
Tanahun 1	Swarnim Wagle	
Tanahun 2	Shreeram Neupane	
Udayapur 1	Paras Mani Gelal	
Udayapur 2	Surya Bahadur Tamang	
Janajati, Female	Basumaya Tamang	
Janajati, Female	Ganga Chhantyal	
Janajati, Female	Sumnima Udas	
Janajati, Female	Anushka Shrestha	
Janajati, Female	Ojashwi Sherchan	
Janajati, Female	Sirjana Shrestha	
Janajati, Female	Rajani Shrestha	
Janajati, Female	Kushum Maharjan	
Janajati, Female	Bhumika Shrestha	
Janajati, Female	Pramila Kuluju	
Janajati, Female	Sujata Tamang	
Janajati, Female	Kripa Maharjan	
Janajati, Female	Eliza Gurung	
Janajati, Male	Ram Lama	
Janajati, Male	Khushbu Sarkar Shrestha	
Janajati, Male	Mingma Gyabu Sherpa	
Khas Arya, Female	Pratibha Rawal	
Khas Arya, Female	Rachana Khatiwada Khatri	
Khas Arya, Female	Lima Adhikari	
Khas Arya, Female	Vidushi Rana	
Khas Arya, Female	Samikchya Baskota	
Khas Arya, Female	Shraddha Kunwar Chhetri	
Khas Arya, Female, Backward Area	Tika Sangraula	
Khas Arya, Female	Aakriti Awasthi	
Khas Arya, Female	Shristi Bhattarai	
Khas Arya, Female	Manju Bhusal	
Khas Arya, Female	Prabha Karki	
Khas Arya, Female	Shobha Khanal	
Khas Arya, Female, Backward Area	Ratna Kumari Thapa	
Khas Arya, Female	Gyanu Poudyal	
Khas Arya, Female	Prabha Dhakal	
Khas Arya, Male	Ramesh Prasai	
Dalit, Female	Reema Bishwakarma	
Dalit, Female	Amrita B.K.	
Dalit, Female	Sita Badi	
Dalit, Female	Smriti Senchuri	
Dalit, Female	Sushma Swarnakar	
Dalit, Female	Tara Bishwakarma	
Dalit, Female	Khima B.K.	
Tharu, Female	Geeta Chaudhary	
Tharu, Female	Karishma Kathariya	
Tharu, Male	Surendra Chaudhary	
Tharu, Male	Premlal Chaudhary	
Madheshi, Female	Poonam Kumari Agrawal	
Madheshi, Female	Nisha Mehta	
Madheshi, Female	Lalita Kumari Sah	
Madheshi, Female	Ankita Thakur	
Madheshi, Female	Sarita Mahato	
Madheshi, Female	Kamini Kumari Chaudhary	
Madheshi, Female	Sunita Kumari Chaudhary	
Madheshi, Male	Purushotam Shuprabhat Yadav	
Madheshi, Male	Khagendra Karna	
Muslim, Female	Samina Miya	
Muslim, Female	Afsana Banu	
Muslim, Female	Gajala Shamim Mikrani	

Nepali Congress (38)
Constituency/PR group	Member	Portfolio & Responsibilities / Remarks
Janajati, Male	Bhishma Raj Angdembe	Parliamentary Party Leader; Leader of the Opposition (from 27 April 2026)
Dailekh 1	Basana Thapa	Chief Whip
Ilam 1	Nishkal Rai	Whip
Achham 1	Bharat Kumar Swar	
Bajura 1	Janak Raj Giri	
Doti 1	Bharat Bahadur Khadka	
Humla 1	Jayapati Rokaya	
Jajarkot 1	Khadak Bahadur Budha	
Kapilvastu 3	Abhishek Pratap Shah	
Manang 1	Tek Bahadur Gurung	
Mugu 1	Khadga Shahi	
Mustang 1	Yogesh Gauchan Thakali	
Palpa 1	Sandeep Rana	
Panchthar 1	Narendra Kerung	
Rasuwa 1	Mohan Acharya	
Rautahat 2	Firdosh Alam	
Solukhumbu 1	Prakash Singh Karki	
Surkhet 1	Bishnu Bahadur Khadka	
Tehrathum 1	Santosh Subba	
Janajati, Female	Geeta Kumari Sendang	
Janajati, Female	Gangalaxmi Awaala	
Janajati, Female	Geeta Gurung	
Janajati, Female	Renuka Kaucha	
Janajati, Male, Disability	Madan Krishna Shrestha	
Khas Arya, Female	Sushila Dhakal Acharya	
Khas Arya, Female	Rukmini Devi Koirala	
Khas Arya, Female	Reena Upreti	
Khas Arya, Female	Sita Thapaliya	
Khas Arya, Male	Arjun Narasingha K. C.	
Khas Arya, Male, Backward Area	Kali Bahadur Sahakari	
Dalit, Female	Harina Devi Kami	
Dalit, Female	Pabitra B.K.	
Dalit, Female	Manmaya Bishwakarma	
Tharu, Female	Pramila Kumari Gachhadar	
Madheshi, Female	Ninu Kumari Karna	
Madheshi, Female	Rekha Kumari Yadav	
Madheshi, Male	Chandra Mohan Yadav	
Muslim, Female	Shahzan Khatun	

CPN (UML) (25)
Constituency/PR group	Member	Portfolio & Responsibilities / Remarks
Janajati, Male	Ram Bahadur Thapa	Parliamentary Party Leader
Bajhang 1	Ain Bahadur Mahar	Chief Whip
Achham 2	Yagya Bahadur Bogati	
Banke 2	Mohammad Ishtiyaq Rayi	
Dailekh 2	Laxmi Prasad Pokharel	
Darchula 1	Ganesh Singh Thagunna	
Dhankuta 1	Rajendra Kumar Rai	
Ilam 2	Suhang Nembang	
Sankhuwasabha 1	Arjun Kumar Karki	
Taplejung 1	Kshitij Thebe	
Janajati, Female	Bhumika Limbu Subba	
Janajati, Female	Gangadevi Shrestha	
Janajati, Male	Kul Bhakta Shakya	
Khas Arya, Female	Padma Kumari Aryal	
Khas Arya, Female	Tukabhadra Hamal	
Khas Arya, Male	Guru Prasad Baral	
Khas Arya, Male	Pushparaj Kandel	
Khas Arya, Female, Backward Area, Disability	Yashoda Kumari Baral	
Tharu, Male	Kriparam Rana	
Dalit, Female	Bishnumaya B.K.	
Dalit, Female	Nita Ghatani	
Madheshi, Female	Ringala Yadav	
Madheshi, Female	Yashoda Kumari Yadav	
Madheshi, Male	Chandeshwar Mandal	
Muslim, Female	Sajida Khatun Siddiqui	

Nepali Communist Party (17)
Constituency/PR group	Member	Portfolio & Responsibilities / Remarks
Eastern Rukum 1	Pushpa Kamal Dahal	Parliamentary Party Leader
Sindhupalchok 2	Yubaraj Dulal	Chief Whip
Dhanusha 1	Matrika Prasad Yadav	
Dolpa 1	Dhan Bahadur Buda	
Kalikot 1	Mahendra Bahadur Shahi	
Rolpa 1	Barshman Pun	
Western Rukum 1	Gopal Sharma	
Salyan 1	Ramesh Kumar Malla	
Janajati, Female	Bhim Kumari Budha Magar	
Janajati, Male	Parshuram Tamang	
Khas Arya, Female	Balabati Sharma	
Khas Arya, Male	Pramesh Kumar Hamal	
Khas Arya, Male, Disability	Prem Bahadur Bayak	
Dalit, Female	Parbati B.K.	
Dalit, Male	Ganesh Bahadur Bishwokarma	
Tharu, Female	Nirasha Chaudhary	
Madheshi, Male	Jogkumar Barbariya Yadav	

Shram Sanskriti Party (7)
Constituency/PR group	Member	Portfolio & Responsibilities / Remarks
Officers of the House of Representatives
Madheshi, Female	Ruby Kumari Thakur	Deputy Speaker of the House of Representatives (from 10 April 2026)
Members of Parliament
Sunsari 1	Harka Sampang	Parliamentary Party Leader
Khotang 1	Aaren Rai	Chief Whip
Bhojpur 1	Dhurbaraj Rai	
Janajati, Male	Purna Prasad Limbu	
Khas Arya, Female	Ambika Devi Sangraula	
Dalit, Female	Radhika Ramtel	

Rastriya Prajatantra Party (5)
Constituency/PR group	Member	Portfolio & Responsibilities / Remarks
Jumla 1	Gyanendra Shahi	Parliamentary Party Leader
Khas Arya, Female	Khusbu Oli	Chief Whip
Janajati, Female	Saraswati Lama	
Khas Arya, Male	Bharat Giri	
Muslim, Male	Tahir Ali Bhat	

Independent (1)
Constituency/PR group	Member	Portfolio & Responsibilities / Remarks
Myagdi 1	Mahabir Pun	

== Sessions ==
The House of Representatives has three sessions in a year; budget session, monsoon session and winter session. The following sessions were held of the 7th House of Representatives.

Session	Date	Key Events	Ref.
Oath	25−26 March 2026	Senior-most member Arjun Narsingh KC (78 years) first took the oath from President Ram Chandra Paudel on March 25, and then administered the oath to other lawmakers on March 26.	
1st	2 April 2026	Inaugural Session of the 7th House of Representatives.	
1st	5 April 2026	Dol Prasad Aryal elected as Speaker of the House of Representatives.	
1st	10 April 2026	President Ram Chandra Paudel addressed the joint session of the Federal Parliament.; Ruby Kumari Thakur elected as Deputy Speaker of the House of Representatives.; Speaker DP Aryal formed the Parliamentary committees.; President Ram Chandra Paudel prorogued the Inaugural Session.	
2nd	11 May 2026	The government tabled 8 ordinances, starting the constitutional 60-day window for parliamentary ratification: Public Procurement (Second Amendment) Ordinance, 2083, Special Provisions on the Removal of Public Officials Ordinance, 2083, Constitutional Council (Function, Duties, Powers and Procedures) (First Amendment) Ordinance, 2083, Prevention of Money Laundering (Third Amendment) Ordinance, 2083, Amendment of Certain Nepal Acts Ordinance, 2083, Cooperatives (First Amendment) Ordinance, 2083, Amendment of Certain Nepal Acts Relating to Health Sciences Institutes Ordinance, 2083, and Amendment of Certain Nepal Acts Relating to Universities Ordinance, 2083.; President Ram Chandra Paudel addressed a joint session of the parliament to deliver the government's policy and programme for the fiscal year 2083/84.	
2nd	12 May 2026	Minister for Law, Justice and Parliamentary Affairs Sobita Gautam tabled the Agreement on Mutual Legal Assistance in Criminal Matters concluded between the Government of Nepal and the Government of India to the house.	
2nd	14 May 2026	Minister of Finance Swarnim Wagle answered questions raised during the general discussion on the government's policy and programme for the fiscal year 2083/84, on behalf of Prime Minister Balen Shah, despite obstruction from opposition parties demanding attendance of the prime minister.; The government's policy and programme for the fiscal year 2083/84 passed by unanimity despite obstruction from opposition parties.	
2nd	21 May 2026	The Alternative Development Finance Mobilization Bill, 2082 passed by a majority vote, amidst the disruption by opposition parties demanding the parliamentary accountability from the prime minister.	
2nd	27 May 2026	Minister of Finance Swarnim Wagle presented the Economic Survey of the fiscal year 2082/83 to the House. The report projected a national economic growth rate of 3.85%, estimated the total size of Nepal's economy at NRs. 6.6 trillion, and noted that per capita gross national income had reached US$ 1,535. It also revealed that public debt stood at NRs. 2.878 trillion, representing 43.6% of the GDP.	
2nd	29 May 2026	Minister of Finance Swarnim Wagle addressed a joint session of the Federal Parliament to deliver the annual budget speech, detailing the estimates of revenue and expenditure for the fiscal year 2083/84. Following the address, the Minister formally tabled the budget document and introduced the Finance Bill, 2083 to initiate the legislative process for the government's tax and revenue proposals.	
2nd	31 May 2026	Prime Minister Balendra Shah participated in an impromptu question-and-answer session following prolonged opposition demands. The proceeding drew immediate procedural objections from opposition benches alleging a breach of the House of Representatives Rules, 2079. The session escalated into a significant political debate after the Prime Minister expressed surprise that recent findings indicated mutual encroachment of land along certain border areas by both India and Nepal, rather than it being one-sided. Opposition lawmakers strongly rejected the characterization, demanding the Prime Minister either substantiate the claim with evidence or issue a formal retraction and apology.; Later in the same sitting, the House passed the House of Representatives Rules, 2083 by a majority vote amidst intense opposition protests. The session descended into physical confrontation as several opposition lawmakers attempted to charge the Speaker and storm the central rostrum, forcing security marshals to form a physical barrier to protect the dais and restore order.	
2nd	10 June 2026	Following a ten-day deadlock, parliament finally resumed after Minister of Foreign Affairs Shisir Khanal clarified the Prime Minister's controversial statement regarding the border dispute. Although the PM refused to yield to opposition demands, the clarification paved way for the house to reopen and transition into general discussion on the FY 2083/84 annual budget.	
2nd	18 June 2026	The House passed the Appropriation Bill, 2083. The proposal, tabled by Minister of Finance Swarnim Wagle, was formally endorsed following the conclusion of the ministry-wise budget reviews and subsequent ministerial responses to lawmakers' inquiries.	
2nd	28 June 2026	Successfully concluding the budget process for the upcoming fiscal year 2083/84, the House passed both the Finance Bill, 2083 and National Debt Recovery Bill, 2083.	
2nd	2 July 2026	Continuing its legislative proceedings, the House passed four ordinance replacement bills: Public Procurement (Second Amendment) Bill, 2083, Prevention of Money Laundering (Third Amendment) Bill, 2083, Cooperatives (First Amendment) Bill, 2083 and Bill to Amend Certain Nepal Acts Relating to the Institute of Health Sciences, 2083.	
2nd	2 October 2026	President Ram Chandra Poudel prorogued the second (budget) session of the parliament.	

== Parliamentary committees ==
Committee	Chairperson
House of Representative Committees
Finance Committee	Krishna Hari Budhathoki (RSP)
International Relations and Tourism Committee	Sumnima Udas (RSP)
Industry, Commerce, Labour and Consumer Welfare Committee	Rahbar Ansari (RSP)
Law, Justice and Human Rights Committee	Samikchya Baskota (RSP)
Agriculture, Cooperatives and Natural Resources Committee	Ashok Kumar Chaudhary (RSP)
Women and Social Affairs Committee	Aakriti Awasthi (RSP)
State Affairs and Good Governance Committee	Hari Dhakal (RSP)
Infrastructure Development Committee	Aashish Gajurel (RSP)
Education, Health and Information Technology Committee	Ojashwi Sherchan (RSP)
Public Accounts Committee	Bharat Bahadur Khadka (Congress)
Joint Committees
Parliamentary Hearing Committee	Bodh Narayan Shrestha (RSP)
State Direction Committee	Ganesh Karki (RSP)

== See also ==
- National Assembly (Nepal)
