= Sarita Mahato =

Nepalese Politician

The Honourable Sarita Mahato
- सरिता महतो

Member of Parliament, Pratinidhi Sabha
- Incumbent
- Assumed office 27 March 2026
- Constituency: PR

Personal details
- Born: 1994 (age 31–32) Malangwa, Sarlahi district, Nepal
- Citizenship: Nepali
- Party: Rastriya Swatantra Party (2025-present)
- Spouse: Sudip Raj Singh (m. 2014)
- Parents: Dhruba Narayan Mahato (father); Urmila Devi Mahato (mother)
- Education: MBA
- Profession: Politician; Activist

Sarita Mahato (Nepali: सरिता महतो) is a Nepalese politician, and activist who is a member of the 7th Pratinidhi Sabha. She was elected to the House of Representatives through proportional representation under the Madheshi female cluster.

She has been a member of Rastriya Swatantra Party since 2025.

== Personal life and education ==
Sarita was born in 1994 in Malangwa, Sarlahi district, Nepal. She is the daughter of Dhruba Narayan Mahato and Urmila Devi Mahato. She passed SLC from Malangwa and completed her 10+2 in science from Capital College and Research Centre, Kathmandu. She then went to India for further studies and did her bachelor's degree and Master of Business Administration.

== Professional career ==
She got a chance to work as a city volunteer with the Kathmandu Metropolitan City. She worked on a children's and environmental project. On completion of the project, she continued as a volunteer and started advocating for inclusive education in every school for autistic children.

== Politics ==
She entered politics in 2025, joining the Rastriya Swatantra Party. She was nominated as a proportional representative member of parliament from the Rastriya Swatantra Party in the 2026 Nepalese general election. She has been a member of the finance parliamentary committee for the Rastriya Swatantra Party in the Pratinidhi Sabha since April 2026.
