= Lalita Kumari Sah =

Nepalese Politician

The Honourable Lalita Kumari Sah
- ललिता कुमारी साह

Member of Parliament, Pratinidhi Sabha
- Incumbent
- Assumed office 27 March 2026
- Constituency: PR

Personal details
- Born: May 16, 1971 (age 55) Laheriasarai, Darbhanga district, India
- Citizenship: Nepalese
- Party: Rastriya Swatantra Party (since 2025)
- Spouse: Bishnu Sah (m. 1999)
- Parents: Chandra Sah (father); Fulo Devi (mother)
- Education: Doctor of Medicine (B. P. Koirala Institute of Health Sciences)
- Profession: Politician, Doctor

Dr. Lalita Kumari Sah (Note: Nepali: ललिता कुमारी साह) (born 16 May 1971) is a Nepalese politician, and medical doctor who is a member of the 7th Pratinidhi Sabha.She was elected to the House of Representatives through proportional representation under the Madheshi female cluster.

She has been a member of Rastriya Swatantra Party since 2025.

== Early life and education ==
Lalita was born on May 16, 1971, in Laheriasarai, Darbhanga district, India. She is the daughter of Chandra Sah and Fulo Devi. She completed her MBBS from Darbhanga Medical College and Hospital and Doctor of Medicine in anesthesia and critical care medicine from B. P. Koirala Institute of Health Sciences, Dharan. She married Bishnu Sah from Mirchaiya, Siraha district in 1999. They both had two children.

== Political career ==
She entered politics, joining the Rastriya Swatantra Party in 2025. She was nominated as a proportional representative member of parliament from the Rastriya Swatantra Party in the 2026 Nepalese general election. She has been a member of the Women and Social Affairs parliamentary committee for the Rastriya Swatantra Party in the Pratinidhi Sabha since April 2026.
