= Shobha Khanal =

Nepalese Politician

The Honourable Shobha Khanal
- शोभा खनाल

Member of Parliament, Pratinidhi Sabha
- Incumbent
- Assumed office 27 March 2026
- Constituency: Party list

Personal details
- Born: 1988 (age 37–38) Gandaki, Gorkha, Nepal
- Citizenship: Nepali
- Party: Rastriya Swatantra Party (since 2025)
- Profession: Politician; Entrepreneur

Shobha Khanal (Note: Nepali: शोभा खनाल) (born 1988) is a Nepalese politician and entrepreneur who is member of the 7th Pratinidhi Sabha. She also serves as the managing director of Himalayan Summit Tracks & Expedition, a private trekking company located in Kathmandu. She is a member of Rastriya Swatantra Party and was elected through proportional representation under the Khas Arya female cluster.

== Early life and education ==
Khanal was born in Gandaki, Gorkha, Gandaki Province, Nepal, on 1988. Karki earned the SLC, a secondary education certificate, from Ratneshwar Secondary School. Later, she moved to Kathmandu and completed her 10+2 at Manmohan Memorial College, Sorhakhutte and pursued a master’s degree in political science from Padma Kanya Multiple Campus. During her studies, she also worked in the trekking industry.

== Career ==
=== Professional career ===
Khanal worked with trekking companies after finishing her studies. She is a founding director of Himalayan Summit Treks & Expedition, Assured Travel & Tours, Himalaya Digital Solutions, and the Inclusive Learning and Research Center. She has more than 15 years of experience in the travel and tours industry.

=== Political career ===
She joined the Rastriya Swatantra Party in 2025, following Nepalese Gen Z protests. She was nominated as a proportional representative member of parliament from the Rastriya Swatantra Party in the 2026 Nepalese general election. She is now a member of the Women and Social Affairs parliamentary committee for the Rastriya Swatantra Party in the Pratinidhi Sabha since April 2026.
