= Khima B.K. =

Nepalese Politician

The Honourable Khima B.K.
- खिमा वि.क.

Member of Parliament, Pratinidhi Sabha
- Incumbent
- Assumed office 27 March 2026
- Constituency: PR

Personal details
- Born: 1999 (age 26–27) Dangisharan, Dang district, Nepal
- Citizenship: Nepali
- Party: Rastriya Swatantra Party (since 2025)
- Parents: Ghanshyam B.K. (father); Pramila B.K. (mother)
- Profession: Politician; Nurse

Khima B.K. (Nepali: खिमा वि.क.) is a Nepalese politician and professional health nurse who is a member of the 7th Pratinidhi Sabha. She has been a member of the Rastriya Swatantra Party since 2025 and was elected through proportional representation under the Dalit female cluster. She is among one of the five professional nurses from the Rastriya Swatantra Party to become a member of parliament in the Pratinidhi Sabha. She is a central committee member of the Rastriya Swatantra Party, elected from first national convention held in Chitwan.

== Early life and education ==
Khima was born in 1999 into a Dalit family in Dangisharan, Dang district, Nepal. She is the daughter of Ghanshyam B.K. and Pramila B.K.. She completed her Diploma in Nursing from Lord Buddha Nursing College, Kohalpur, Banke in 2020.

== Professional career ==
After completing her diploma in nursing, she began working at various hospitals in Dang district. She also traveled to Dubai to work as a nurse, but returned to Nepal after about two months due to low salary and allowances. She then resumed her nursing career at a hospital in Bhairahawa.

== Politics ==
She joined the Rastriya Swatantra Party in 2025, following the 2025 Nepalese Gen Z protests. She was nominated as a proportional representative member of parliament from the Rastriya Swatantra Party in the 2026 Nepalese general election. She is now a member of the Women and Social Affairs parliamentary committee for the Rastriya Swatantra Party in the Pratinidhi Sabha since April 2026.
