= Sushma Swarnakar =

Nepalese Politician

The Honourable Sushma Swarnakar
- सुष्मा स्वर्णकार

Member of Parliament, Pratinidhi Sabha
- Incumbent
- Assumed office 27 March 2026
- Constituency: PR

Personal details
- Born: 1978 (age 47–48) India
- Citizenship: Nepali
- Party: Rastriya Swatantra Party (2023-present)
- Spouse: Chakraman Bishwakarma (m. 1996)
- Parents: Amar Swarnakar (father); Parvati Swarnakar (mother)
- Profession: Politician

Sushma Swarnakar (Nepali: सुष्मा स्वर्णकार) also known as Dimpal is a Nepalese politician and housewife who is member of the 7th Pratinidhi Sabha. She is a member of the Rastriya Swatantra Party and was elected through proportional representation under the Dalit female cluster.

== Early life and education ==
Swarnakar was born in 1978 into a Dalit family in India. She is the daughter of Amar Swarnakar and Parvati Swarnakar. Her family moved from India to Kohalpur when she was 8. She studied up to Intermediate of Arts and was active in activism for the Dalit community. She is a member of the Dalit Khai campaign and Lions Clubs International, Nepal.

== Politics ==
She joined the Rastriya Swatantra Party in 2023. She was nominated as a proportional representative member of parliament from the Rastriya Swatantra Party in the 2026 Nepalese general election. She is now a member of the Law, Justice and Human Rights parliamentary committee for the Rastriya Swatantra Party in the Pratinidhi Sabha since April 2026.

== Personal life ==
She married Chakraman Bishwakarma in 1996, a resident of Salyan, when she was 18 years old. They both have two children.
