= Tara Bishwakarma =

Nepalese Politician

The Honourable Tara Bishwakarma
- तारा विश्वकर्मा

Member of Parliament, Pratinidhi Sabha
- Incumbent
- Assumed office 27 March 2026
- Constituency: PR

Personal details
- Born: 1990 (age 35–36) Banepa, Kavrepalanchok district, Nepal
- Citizenship: Nepali
- Party: Rastriya Swatantra Party (2024-present)
- Spouse: Shankar Bishwakarma
- Parents: Bidur Bishwakarma (father); Shanta Bishwakarma (mother)
- Profession: Politician

Tara Bishwakarma (Nepali: तारा विश्वकर्मा) is a Nepalese politician who is member of the 7th Pratinidhi Sabha. She is a member of the Rastriya Swatantra Party since 2024, she is serving as a party regional secretary of Lalitpur region. She was elected through proportional representation under the Dalit female cluster.

== Early life and education ==
Bishwakarma was born in 1990 into a Dalit family in Banepa, Kavrepalanchok district, Nepal. She is the daughter of Bidur Bishwakarma and Shanta Bishwakarma. She completed her higher education in Intermediate of Arts. She married Shankar Bishwakarma, a resident of Lalitpur.

== Politics ==
She joined the Rastriya Swatantra Party in 2024. She also serves as the party's regional secretary for Lalitpur. She was nominated as a proportional representative member of parliament from the Rastriya Swatantra Party in the 2026 Nepalese general election. She is now a member of the Women and Social Affairs parliamentary committee for the Rastriya Swatantra Party in the Pratinidhi Sabha since April 2026.
