= Prabha Dhakal =

Nepalese politician

The Honourable Prabha Dhakal
- प्रभा ढकाल

Member of Parliament, Pratinidhi Sabha
- Incumbent
- Assumed office 27 March 2026
- Constituency: Party-list proportional representation

Personal details
- Born: December 10, 1986 (age 39) Kolhabi, Bara district, Nepal
- Citizenship: Nepali
- Party: Rastriya Swatantra Party (2022–present)
- Parents: Krishna Bahadur Dhakal (father); Saraswati Dhakal (mother)
- Profession: Politician; Nurse

Prabha Dhakal (Note: Nepali: प्रभा ढकाल) (born 10 December 1986) is a Nepalese politician and health nurse who is a member of the 7th Pratinidhi Sabha. Dhakal is a member of the Rastriya Swatantra Party. She was elected to the House of Representatives through proportional representation, representing the Khas Arya female cluster.

In June 2026, Dhakal was elected to the RSP's central committee at the party's general convention held in Chitwan.

== Early life and education ==
Dhakal was born in a Khas family in Kolhabi, Bara district, Madhesh Province, Nepal, on December 10, 1986. She is the daughter of Krishna Bahadur Dhakal and Saraswati Dhakal. She completed her primary education and secondary education in Bara, and moved to Bharatpur, Chitwan to pursue nursing education.

== Professional career ==
Dhakal is a professional health nurse and worked at College of Medical Sciences, Bharatpur. She was also a member of Lions Clubs International, Saptarangi.

== Politics ==
She joined the Rastriya Swatantra Party in 2022. She was nominated as a proportional representative member of parliament from the Rastriya Swatantra Party in the 2026 Nepalese general election. She is now a member of the Education, Health and Information Technology parliamentary committee for the Rastriya Swatantra Party in the Pratinidhi Sabha since April 2026.
