= Ganga Chhantyal =

Nepalese Politician

The Honourable Ganga Chhantyal
- गंगा छन्त्याल

Member of Parliament, Pratinidhi Sabha
- Incumbent
- Assumed office 27 March 2026
- Constituency: PR

Personal details
- Born: 1991 (age 34–35) Taman Khola, Baglung, Nepal
- Citizenship: Nepali
- Party: Rastriya Swatantra Party
- Spouse: Kushal Tamang
- Education: Navodit College (10+2)
- Profession: Politician

Ganga Chhantyal (Nepali: गंगा छन्त्याल) is a Nepalese politician who has been serving as a member of parliament from the Rastriya Swatantra Party. She is a member of 7th Pratinidhi Sabha elected through Proportional Representation under the Janajati female cluster in the 2026 general election.

== Early life and education ==
Tamang was born in Taman Khola, Baglung, Gandaki Province, Nepal in 1991. She belongs to the Chhantyal ethnic group of Nepal. She completed 10+2 from the Navodit, Kathmandu. She is married to Kushal Tamang of Sindhupalchowk. She contracted Polio at birth. She is involved with the National Indigenous Peoples Disabled Self-Employed Women's Association Nepal.

== Politics ==
She has been a member of the Rastriya Swatantra Party since 2025. She was nominated as a proportional representative member of parliament from the Rastriya Swatantra Party in the 2026 Nepalese general election. She is now member of the International Relations and Tourism Committee of Pratinidhi Sabha.
