= Gajala Shamim Mikrani =

Nepalese Politician

The Honourable Gajala Shamim Mikrani
- गजाला शमीम मिकरानी

Member of Parliament, Pratinidhi Sabha
- Incumbent
- Assumed office 27 March 2026
- Constituency: PR

Personal details
- Born: 1995 (age 30–31) Rajdevi, Rautahat District, Nepal
- Citizenship: Nepali
- Party: Rastriya Swatantra Party (2025-present)
- Parents: Shamim Mikrani (father); Shamsun Nesha (mother)
- Profession: Politician; Activist

Gajala Shamim Mikrani (Nepali: गजाला शमीम मिकरानी) is a Nepalese politician and social activist who is member of the 7th Pratinidhi Sabha. She joined Rastriya Swatantra Party in 2025 and was elected to the 7th Pratinidhi Sabha through proportional representation under the Muslim female cluster.

She is one of five women members from the Muslim community representing in the Parliament of Nepal.

== Personal life and education ==
Mikrani was born in 1995 into a Muslim family in Rajdevi, Rautahat District, Nepal. She is the daughter of Shamim Mikrani and Shamsun Nesha. She did Diploma in Pharmacy and bachelor's degree in business management and law from affiliate college of Tribhuvan University.

== Activism and politics ==
Before starting her political career, she worked with various social organizations for more than 4 years. She gained experience working in rural areas on education, health, livelihoods, and social development.

She joined Rastriya Swatantra Party in 2025. She was nominated as a proportional representative member of parliament from the Rastriya Swatantra Party in the 2026 Nepalese general election. Since April 2026, she has been a member of the state affairs and good governance parliamentary committee for the Rastriya Swatantra Party in the Pratinidhi Sabha.
