= Poonam Kumari Agrawal =

Nepalese Politician

The Honourable Poonam Kumari Agrawal
- पुनम कुमारी अग्रवाल

Member of Parliament, Pratinidhi Sabha
- Incumbent
- Assumed office 27 March 2026
- Constituency: PR

Personal details
- Born: 1983 (age 42–43) Siraha district, Nepal
- Citizenship: Nepali
- Party: Rastriya Swatantra Party (2023-present); Madheshi Jana Adhikar Forum, Nepal (Loktantrik) (2017)
- Spouse: Siddharth Agrawal
- Parents: Baijnath Agrawal (father); Santosh Agrawal (mother)
- Education: Master's degree (Tribhuvan University)
- Profession: Politician; Entrepreneur; Associate Professor

Poonam Kumari Agrawal (Nepali: पुनम कुमारी अग्रवाल) is a Nepalese politician, entrepreneur and associate professor who is a member of the 7th Pratinidhi Sabha. She was elected to the House of Representatives through proportional representation under the Madheshi female cluster.

She is the co-founder and managing director of Grow More, Nepal's first organic fertilizer plant and industry. She is also an associate professor of medical microbiology.

== Early life and education ==
Agrawal was born in 1983 into a Marwari family in Siraha district, Nepal. She is the daughter of Baijnath Agrawal and Santosh Agrawal. She completed her bachelor's degree in microbiology from Tri-Chandra Multiple Campus and master's degree in medical microbiology from Tribhuvan University, Kirtipur.

== Professional career ==
She started her career as an associate professor in various medical colleges in Kathmandu after graduating from Tribhuvan University. She moved to Bhairahawa after marrying Sidhharth Agrawal. She worked at Bhairahawa Medical College and Devdaha Medical College for a couple of years. After the COVID-19 pandemic in Nepal, they both quit jobs and established a production plant named Grow More Fertilizer and Chemical Pvt. Ltd., which produces Nepal's first organic fertilizer brand Ratnam, in Rohini, Rupandehi.

== Politics ==
She joined the Madheshi Jana Adhikar Forum, Nepal (Loktantrik) in 2017. The party made her a mayoral candidate for Siddharthanagar in the 2017 Nepalese local elections. She lost the election and placed in sixth position with 830 votes. She took a break from active politics and focused on her job and business. She joined the Rastriya Swatantra Party in 2023. She also submitted her name to the RSP candidate club to become a party candidate to contest the by-election for the Rupandehi 3 constituency. Later, the election was cancelled after the dissolution of the 6th Pratinidhi Sabha. She was nominated as a proportional representative member of parliament from the Rastriya Swatantra Party in the 2026 Nepalese general election. She is now a member of the Agriculture and Natural Resources parliamentary committee for the Rastriya Swatantra Party in the Pratinidhi Sabha since April 2026.

== Electoral performance ==
Election	Year	Constituency	Contested for	Political party	Result	Votes	% of votes	Ref.
Nepal local election	2017	Siddharthanagar	Mayor	Madheshi Jana Adhikar Forum, Nepal (Loktantrik)	Lost	830	3.64%	
