= Samina Miya =

Nepalese Politician

The Honourable Samina Miya
- समिना मियाँ

Member of Parliament, Pratinidhi Sabha
- Incumbent
- Assumed office 27 March 2026
- Constituency: PR

Personal details
- Born: 1989 (age 36–37) Bharatpur, Chitwan District, Nepal
- Citizenship: Nepali
- Party: Rastriya Swatantra Party (2022-present)
- Parents: Mohammad Ali Miya (father); Samsu Miya (mother)
- Education: Master of Science in Nursing (Rajiv Gandhi University of Health Sciences)
- Profession: Politician; Nurse

Samina Miya (Nepali: समिना मियाँ) is a Nepalese politician and professional nurse who is member of the 7th Pratinidhi Sabha. She is a member of the Rastriya Swatantra Party since 2022, she is serving as a party central member.

She was elected to the 7th Pratinidhi Sabha through proportional representation under the Muslim female cluster. She is one of the five women member from Muslim community to represent in Parliament of Nepal.

== Personal life and education ==
Miya was born in 1989 into a Muslim family in Bharatpur, Chitwan district, Nepal. She is the daughter of Mohammad Ali Miya and Samsu Miya. She completed her secondary education from Balkumari Kanya Secondary School. She did Diploma in Nursing from Butwal, Bachelor of Science in Nursing from Bharatpur and Master of Science in Nursing from Rajiv Gandhi University of Health Sciences, Bangalore, India.

== Politics ==
She joined the Rastriya Swatantra Party in 2022. The party placed her on the proportional representation list in the 2022 Nepalese general election, but she could not become a member of parliament because the party did not secure enough proportional votes at that time.

She also serves as the party's central committee member. She was again nominated as a proportional representative member of parliament from the Rastriya Swatantra Party in the 2026 Nepalese general election. She is now a member of the agriculture, cooperatives, and natural resources parliamentary committee for the Rastriya Swatantra Party in the Pratinidhi Sabha since April 2026.
