= Sunita Kumari Chaudhary =

Nepalese Politician

The Honourable Sunita Kumari Chaudhary
- सुनिता कुमारी चौधरी

Member of Parliament, Pratinidhi Sabha
- Incumbent
- Assumed office 27 March 2026
- Constituency: PR

Personal details
- Born: 1991 (age 34–35) Pakaha Mainpur, Parsa District, Nepal
- Citizenship: Nepali
- Party: Rastriya Swatantra Party (2025-present)
- Spouse: Jitendra Sahani
- Parents: Rameshwar Prasad (father); Basanti Devi (mother)
- Profession: Politician

Sunita Kumari Chaudhary (Nepali: सुनिता कुमारी चौधरी) is a Nepalese politician who is member of the 7th Pratinidhi Sabha. She is a member of the Rastriya Swatantra Party since 2025, she is serving as a party central member. She was elected through proportional representation under the Madheshi female cluster. She is the only member of parliament representing Nishad caste community.

== Personal life and education ==
Chaudhary was born in 1991 into a Nishad family in Pakaha Mainpur, Parsa district, Nepal. She is the daughter of Rameshwar Prasad and Basanti Devi. She completed her higher education in Intermediate of Arts. She married Jitendra Sahani, a resident of Birgunj and president of Nepal Nishad Parishad.

== Politics ==
She joined the Rastriya Swatantra Party in 2025. She also serves as the party's central committee member. She was nominated as a proportional representative member of parliament from the Rastriya Swatantra Party in the 2026 Nepalese general election. She is now a member of the women and social affairs parliamentary committee for the Rastriya Swatantra Party in the Pratinidhi Sabha since April 2026.
