= Ratna Kumari Thapa =

Nepalese Politician

The Honourable Ratna Kumari Thapa
- रत्ना कुमारी थापा

Member of Parliament, Pratinidhi Sabha
- Incumbent
- Assumed office 27 March 2026
- Constituency: Party list

Personal details
- Born: 1985 (age 40–41) Achham, Nepal
- Citizenship: Nepali
- Party: Rastriya Swatantra Party (since 2024)
- Spouse: Janak Bahadur Dhami
- Profession: Politician; Teacher; House wife

Ratna Kumari Thapa (Note: Nepali: रत्ना कुमारी थापा) (born 1985) is a Nepalese politician, school teacher and house wife who is member of the 7th Pratinidhi Sabha. She was a school teacher of Saraswati Secondary School, a government community school located in Achham. She is a member of Rastriya Swatantra Party and was elected through proportional representation under the Khas Arya female and backward area cluster.

== Early life and education ==
Thapa was born in Achham, Sudurpashchim Province, Nepal, on 1985. Thapa was married to Janak Bahadur Dhami, a resident of Panchadewal Binayak following completion of her SLC, a secondary education certificate. She completed her 10+2 at Vidya Mandir Higher Secondary School, Binayak, and pursued a bachelor’s degree from Panchadeval Multiple Campus. She also passed the teacher license examination from the Teacher Service Commission, Nepal.

== Career ==
=== Professional career ===
Thapa worked as a school teacher for more than 15 years at Saraswati Secondary School, Binayak. She is currently engaged in her family's crepe rubber business located in Kathmandu.

=== Political career ===
She joined the Rastriya Swatantra Party on September 22, 2024. She was nominated as a proportional representative member of parliament from the Rastriya Swatantra Party in the 2026 Nepalese general election. She is now a member of the Women and Social Affairs parliamentary committee for the Rastriya Swatantra Party in the Pratinidhi Sabha since April 2026.
