= Kamini Kumari Chaudhary =

Nepalese Politician

The Honourable Kamini Kumari Chaudhary
- कामिनी कुमारी चौधरी

Member of Parliament, Pratinidhi Sabha
- Incumbent
- Assumed office March 27, 2026
- Constituency: PR

Personal details
- Born: October 21, 1984 (age 42) Matihani, Mahottari district, Nepal
- Citizenship: Nepali
- Party: Rastriya Swatantra Party (since 2022)
- Parents: Mahendra Prasad Chaudhary (father); Jagtarini Devi (mother)
- Education: Master's degree
- Profession: Politician; NGO worker

Kamini Kumari Chaudhary (Nepali: कामिनी कुमारी चौधरी; born October 21, 1984) is a Nepalese politician, and Non-governmental organization worker who is a member of the 7th Pratinidhi Sabha.She was elected to the House of Representatives through proportional representation under the Madheshi female cluster.

She has been a member of Rastriya Swatantra Party since 2022. She was elected as a central committee member of the Rastriya Swatantra Party at the first general convention held in Chitwan in 2026.

== Personal life and education ==
Kamini was born on October 21, 1984, in Matihani, Mahottari district, Nepal. She is the daughter of Mahendra Prasad Chaudhary and Jagtarini Devi. She completed her Master's degree from Tribhuvan University.

== Politics ==
She entered politics, joining the Rastriya Swatantra Party in 2022. The party placed her on the proportional representation list in the 2022 Nepalese general election, but she could not become a member of parliament because the party did not secure enough proportional votes at that time.

The party again nominated her as a proportional representation member in the 2026 Nepalese general election. She became a member of parliament as the party secured 47.84% of the proportional vote in the general election. She has been serving as a member of the Education, Health, and Information Technology parliamentary committee for the Rastriya Swatantra Party in the Pratinidhi Sabha since April 2026.
