= Amrita B.K. =

Nepalese Politician

The Honourable Amrita B.K.
- अमृता वि.क.

Member of Parliament, Pratinidhi Sabha
- Incumbent
- Assumed office 27 March 2026
- Constituency: Party list

Personal details
- Born: 1983 (age 42–43) Butwal, Rupandehi district, Nepal
- Citizenship: Nepali
- Party: Rastriya Swatantra Party (since 2025)
- Profession: Politician; Entrepreneur

Amrita B.K. (Nepali: अमृता वि.क.) is a Nepalese politician and entrepreneur who is member of the 7th Pratinidhi Sabha. She is a member of the Rastriya Swatantra Party and was elected through proportional representation under the Dalit female cluster.

== Early life and education ==
Amrita was born in a Dalit Bishwakarma family in Butwal, Rupandehi district, Lumbini Province, Nepal, on 1983. She is the daughter of Ram Bahadur Rasali and Kamala Rasali. She completed her High school degree from Tribhuvan University. She is married to Ram Prasad B.K..

== Career ==
=== Professional career ===
She owned a Jewellery store in Butwal and Dubai and has more than 25 years of experience in this field. Her father and father-in-law are active in politics, and both are involved in the Communist Party of Nepal (Unified Marxist–Leninist). She was a member of Lions Clubs International.

=== Political career ===
She joined the Rastriya Swatantra Party in 2025 following the 2025 Nepalese Gen Z protests. She was nominated as a proportional representative member of parliament from the Rastriya Swatantra Party in the 2026 Nepalese general election. She is now a member of the Public Accounts parliamentary committee for the Rastriya Swatantra Party in the Pratinidhi Sabha since April 2026.
