= Afsana Banu =

Nepalese Politician

The Honourable Afsana Banu
- अफ्साना बानु

Member of Parliament, Pratinidhi Sabha
- Incumbent
- Assumed office 27 March 2026
- Constituency: PR

Personal details
- Born: 1995 (age 30–31) Kathmandu, Kathmandu District, Nepal
- Citizenship: Nepali
- Party: Rastriya Swatantra Party (2026-present)
- Parents: Amir Miya Muslim (father); Nadira Banu Muslim (mother)
- Profession: Politician; Activist

Afsana Banu (Nepali: अफ्साना बानु) is a Nepalese politician and social activist who is member of the 7th Pratinidhi Sabha. She is a member of the Rastriya Swatantra Party since 2026 following the Nepalese Gen Z protests.

She was elected to the 7th Pratinidhi Sabha through proportional representation under the Muslim female cluster. She is one of the five women member from Muslim community to represent in Parliament of Nepal.

== Personal life and education ==
Miya was born in 1995 into a Muslim family in Kathmandu, Kathmandu District, Nepal. She is the daughter of Amir Miya Muslim and Nadira Banu Muslim. She is pursuing bachelor's degree from Ratna Rajya Laxmi Campus.

== Activism and politics ==
She was the coordinator of Council of Gen-Z for the Bagmati province and front-line activist to lead the 2025 Nepalese Gen Z protests. After the dissolution of the 6th Pratinidhi Sabha, she along with other activists are approached to join the Ujyalo Nepal Party, but the talk was failed to reach an agreement after Sudan Gurung pulls out himself.

She joined Rastriya Swatantra Party in 2026. She was nominated as a proportional representative member of parliament from the Rastriya Swatantra Party in the 2026 Nepalese general election. Since April 2026, she has been a member of the law, justice and human rights parliamentary committee for the Rastriya Swatantra Party in the Pratinidhi Sabha.
