= Karishma Kathariya =

Nepalese Politician

The Honourable Karishma Kathariya
- करिश्मा कठरिया

Member of Parliament, Pratinidhi Sabha
- Incumbent
- Assumed office 27 March 2026
- Constituency: PR

Personal details
- Born: February 23, 1997 (age 29) Gauriganga, Kailali district, Nepal
- Citizenship: Nepali
- Party: Rastriya Swatantra Party (2025-present); Nagrik Unmukti Party (2022-25)
- Spouse: Rajesh Chaudhary
- Parents: Raj Kumar Kathariya (father); Tara Devi Kathariya (mother)
- Education: Bachelor's degree (Tikapur Multiple Campus)
- Profession: Politician; Teacher

Karishma Kathariya (Nepali: करिश्मा कठरिया) is a Nepalese politician and former school teacher who is a member of the 7th Pratinidhi Sabha.

Her political journey started with the Nagrik Unmukti Party in 2022. She joined the Rastriya Swatantra Party in 2025 and was elected through proportional representation under the Tharu female cluster. She is the first member of parliament in the Pratinidhi Sabha from the Kathariya community. She is a central member of the Rastriya Swatantra Party, elected at the first national convention held in Chitwan.

== Early life and education ==
Kathariya was born on February 23, 1997, into a middle-class Tharu family in Gauriganga, Kailali district, Nepal. She is the daughter of Raj Kumar Kathariya and Tara Devi Kathariya. She completed her primary education at Kshtiz English Boarding School and secondary education at Janpriya Secondary School in Tikapur. She did her bachelor's degree in Management from Tikapur Multiple Campus. She is married to Rajesh Chaudhary.

== Professional career ==
She started her career as a teacher. She became the school headmaster of Jyoti Primary School in Tikapur at the age of 23. She taught there for about four years before entering formal politics. She was also involved in JCI Janaki, an affiliate chapter of JCI Nepal. She was the president for three years of Kistiya Mahila Agricultural Organization, a cooperative bank. She is a co-founder of Arogya Agriculture Trade and Pvt. Ltd. and Karishma Impex.

== Politics ==
She joined the Nagrik Unmukti Party in 2022. The party also included her name as a proportional representative in the 2022 Nepalese general election, but at that time she could not make it to parliament. Following the 2025 Nepalese Gen Z protests, she joined the Rastriya Swatantra Party in 2025. She was nominated as a proportional representative member of parliament from the Rastriya Swatantra Party in the 2026 Nepalese general election. She is now a member of the Finance parliamentary committee for the Rastriya Swatantra Party in the Pratinidhi Sabha since April 2026.
