= Kripa Maharjan =

Nepalese Politician

The Honourable Kripa Maharjan
- कृपा महर्जन

Member of Parliament, Pratinidhi Sabha
- Incumbent
- Assumed office 27 March 2026
- Constituency: PR

Personal details
- Born: 1990 (age 35–36) Kathmandu, Kathmandu District, Nepal
- Citizenship: Nepali
- Party: Rastriya Swatantra Party
- Parents: Krishna Man Maharjan (father); Rachana Maharjan (mother)
- Profession: Politician

Kripa Maharjan (Nepali: कृपा महर्जन) is a Nepalese politician. She is currently serving as a member of parliament from the Rastriya Swatantra Party. She is a member of 7th Pratinidhi Sabha elected through proportional representation under the Janajati female cluster in the 2026 general election.

== Early life ==
Maharjan was born in Kathmandu, Kathmandu district, Nepal in 1990. She belongs to the Newar ethnic group of Nepal. She is the daughter of Krishna Man Maharjan and Rachana Maharjan.

== Politics ==
She has been a member of the Rastriya Swatantra Party since 2025. She was nominated as a proportional representative member of parliament from the Rastriya Swatantra Party in the 2026 Nepalese general election. She has been a member of the public accounts parliamentary committee for the Rastriya Swatantra Party in the Pratinidhi Sabha since April 2026.
