= Eliza Gurung =

Nepalese Politician

The Honourable Eliza Gurung
- एलिजा गुरुङ

Member of Parliament, Pratinidhi Sabha
- Incumbent
- Assumed office 27 March 2026
- Constituency: PR

Personal details
- Born: 1996 (age 29–30) Dharche, Gorkha, Nepal
- Citizenship: Nepali
- Party: Rastriya Swatantra Party
- Education: Thojo Campus (10+2)
- Profession: Politician
- Beauty pageant titleholder
- Title: Miss Indigenous 2019
- Hair color: Black
- Eye color: Dark Brown
- Major competitions: Miss Indigenous 2019; (Winner)

Eliza Gurung (Nepali: एलिजा गुरुङ) also spelled as Alija Gurung is a Nepalese politician and beauty queen who was crowned Miss Indigenous 2019. She has been serving as a member of parliament from the Rastriya Swatantra Party. She is a member of 7th Pratinidhi Sabha elected through Proportional Representation under the Janajati female cluster in the 2026 general election. She is central committee member of the Rastriya Swatantra Party and first women member of parliament from northern remote area of Gorkha district.

== Early life and education ==
Gurung was born in Dharche, Gorkha, Gandaki Province, Nepal in 1996. She belongs to the Gurung ethnic group of Nepal. She completed her school education from Keraunja Secondary School and 10+2 from the Thojo Campus, Manang. In 2019, she won the title of Miss Indigenous, organized by SK Entertainment at Rastriya Naach Ghar, Kathmandu.

== Politics ==
She has been a founding member of the Rastriya Swatantra Party since its formation in 2022. She was nominated as a proportional representative member of parliament from the Rastriya Swatantra Party in the 2022 Nepalese general election. However, she did not make it to the Pratinidhi Sabha. The party again put her name on the proportional representation list for the 2026 Nepalese general election, and this time she made it to Nepal's lower house. She is now a member of the Industry, Commerce, Labour and Consumer Welfare Committee.
