= Ojashwi Sherchan =

Nepalese politician

- ओजश्वी शेरचन

Member of Parliament, Pratinidhi Sabha
- Incumbent
- Assumed office 27 March 2026
- Constituency: PR

Personal details
- Citizenship: Nepalese
- Party: Rastriya Swatantra Party
- Education: BPKIHS (MBBS)
- Profession: Politician; Associate professor

Ojashwi Sherchan (Nepali: ओजश्वी शेरचन) is a Nepalese politician, medical researcher and former biochemistry professor who has been serving as a member of parliament from the Rastriya Swatantra Party. She is a member of 7th Pratinidhi Sabha through Proportional Representation under Janajati female cluster in the 2026 General Election. Sherchan was formerly an associate professor of the Nepal Medical College biochemistry department before entering as a lawmaker from RSP.

She also serves as a party chairman of the Education, Health and Information Technology parliamentary committee for the Rastriya Swatantra Party under the House of Representatives since April 2026. She holds MBBS from B.P. Koirala Institute of Health Sciences. On 7 April 2026, addressing the parliament meeting of House of Representatives, Sherchan stated that the National Health Insurance program is at risk of suspension due to a lack of budget and urged government to implement policy reforms for a long term solution.
