= Sujata Tamang =

Nepalese Politician

The Honourable Sujata Tamang
- सुजाता तामाङ

Member of Parliament, Pratinidhi Sabha
- Incumbent
- Assumed office 27 March 2026
- Constituency: PR

Personal details
- Born: 1987 (age 38–39) Tumlingtar, Sankhuwasabha, Nepal
- Citizenship: Nepali
- Party: Rastriya Swatantra Party
- Parents: Balram Baidya (father); Dambar Kumari (mother)
- Education: Tribhuvan University (Master's degree); University of New South Wales (Master's & PhD)
- Profession: Politician; Researcher

Sujata Tamang (Nepali: सुजाता तामाङ; born 1987) is a Nepalese politician and agriculture researcher. She is currently serving as a member of parliament from the Rastriya Swatantra Party. She is a member of 7th Pratinidhi Sabha elected through Proportional Representation under the Janajati female cluster in the 2026 general election.

== Early life and education ==
Tamang was born in Tumlingtar, Sankhuwasabha, Koshi Province, Nepal. She was born to Balram Baidya and Dambar Kumari in a rural farming family. She belongs to the Tamang ethnic group of Nepal. She completed her primary and secondary education in Tumlingtar, Dharan, Hetauda, and Chitwan. She moved to Kathmandu to pursue a Master’s degree in rural development at Tribhuvan University. She completed her Master’s and PhD at the University of New South Wales in Australia. Her PhD research paper was entitled Feminization of local communities and its impact on food security.

== Politics ==
She has been a member of the Rastriya Swatantra Party since 2025. She was nominated as a proportional representative member of parliament from the Rastriya Swatantra Party in the 2026 Nepalese general election. She is now a member of the Agriculture and Natural Resources parliamentary committee for the Rastriya Swatantra Party in the Pratinidhi Sabha since April 2026.
