= Rajani Shrestha =

Nepalese Politician

The Honourable Rajani Shrestha
- रजनी श्रेष्ठ

Member of Parliament, Pratinidhi Sabha
- Incumbent
- Assumed office 27 March 2026
- Constituency: PR

Personal details
- Born: 1981 (age 44–45) Miklajung, Morang, Nepal
- Citizenship: Nepali
- Party: Rastriya Swatantra Party
- Spouse: Samir Shrestha
- Profession: Politician; Female bodybuilder

Rajani Shrestha (Nepali: रजनी श्रेष्ठ) is a Nepalese politician and professional female bodybuilder. She is currently serving as a member of parliament from the Rastriya Swatantra Party. She is a member of 7th Pratinidhi Sabha elected through proportional representation under the Janajati female cluster in the 2026 general election. She made her competitive debut in female bodybuilding and won a bronze medal in the 12th South Asia Bodybuilding Championship held in Nepal.She won gold medal for Nepal in the 55 kg category at the 55th Asian Bodybuilding Championship in 2023 and silver medal at the 15th World Bodybuilding and Physique Sports Championship in 2024.

== Early life ==
Shrestha was born in Miklajung, Morang, Nepal in 1981. She belongs to the Newar ethnic group of Nepal. She is married to Samir Shrestha, and they have one child.

== Politics ==
She has been a member of the Rastriya Swatantra Party since 2025. She was nominated as a proportional representative member of parliament from the Rastriya Swatantra Party in the 2026 Nepalese general election. She has been a member of the Women and Social Affairs parliamentary committee for the Rastriya Swatantra Party in the Pratinidhi Sabha since April 2026.
