= Shraddha Kunwar Chhetri =

Nepalese Politician

The Honourable Shraddha Kunwar Chhetri
- श्रद्धा कुँवर क्षेत्री

Member of Parliament, Pratinidhi Sabha
- Incumbent
- Assumed office 27 March 2026
- Constituency: PR

Personal details
- Born: 1999 (age 26–27) Devdaha, Nepal
- Citizenship: Nepalese
- Party: Rastriya Swatantra Party (since 2025)
- Other political affiliations: CPN (UML); Rastriya Yuwa Sangh Nepal
- Parent: Guman Singh Kunwar (father)
- Profession: Politician

Shraddha Kunwar Chhetri (Note: Nepali: श्रद्धा कुँवर क्षेत्री) (born 1999) is a Nepalese politician. She is currently serving as a member of parliament representing the Rastriya Swatantra Party. She is part of the 7th Pratinidhi Sabha, having been elected through proportional representation within the Khas Arya female cluster.

== Early life and education ==
Chhetri was born in 1999 in Devdaha, Rupandehi District, Lumbini Province, Nepal. She did her primary education and secondary education in Butwal. She is pursuing a master's degree in environment, disaster management, and public health from Tribhuvan University.

== Political career ==
At a young age, she joined Rastriya Yuwa Sangh, a youth wing of Communist Party of Nepal (UML), where she served as a central committee member and treasurer. Later, she joined the Communist Party of Nepal (UML), where she was active as a district committee member. She quit the party after the 2025 Nepalese Gen Z protests and moved towards the Rastriya Swatantra Party. She was nominated as a proportional representative member of parliament from the Rastriya Swatantra Party in the 2026 Nepalese general election. She is now a member of the State Affairs and Good Governance parliamentary committee for the Rastriya Swatantra Party in the Pratinidhi Sabha since April 2026.

== Other works ==
She was equally active in social activities and leadership development sectors. She became the first woman president of Leo Club Devdaha in 2020.
