= Ashika Tamang =

Nepalese politician, activist, and actress (born 1992)

- आशिका तामाङ

Member of Parliament, Pratinidhi Sabha
- Incumbent
- Assumed office 26 March 2026
- Preceded by: Rajendra Prasad Pandey
- Constituency: Dhading 1

Personal details
- Born: 17 October 1992 (age 34) Malekhu, Dhading District, Nepal
- Party: Rastriya Swatantra (since 2026)
- Spouse: Thomas
- Children: 2
- Profession: Politician, social activist, nurse, actress

Ashika Tamang (born 17 October 1992) is a Nepalese politician, social activist, and former actress. She is a Member of Parliament, having been elected from the Dhading 1 constituency as a candidate of the Rastriya Swatantra Party in the 2026 Nepalese general election.

== Early life ==
Tamang was born in Malekhu in Dhading District, Nepal, where she spent her early years. Growing up in a rural environment she gained firsthand insight into the challenges faced by ordinary people. These experiences influenced her outlook and motivated her to work toward social equality, public welfare, and empowering local communities.

== Political career ==
Following the 2025 Nepalese Gen Z protests that overthrew the then Nepalese Government, Tamang was nominated by the Rastriya Swatantra Party to contest for 2026 Nepalese general election from Dhading-1. She went on to win decisively, securing a total of 39,128 votes.

In August 2026, Tamang proposed re-establishing the death penalty for convicted rapists.

== Personal life ==
Tamang is married to a German citizen, Thomas. She is the mother of two children, a son and a daughter. She lived in Germany for several years, working as a nurse, before permanently relocating to Nepal in 2024 with her children.
