= Prabha Karki =

Nepalese Politician

The Honourable Prabha Karki
- प्रभा कार्की

Member of Parliament, Pratinidhi Sabha
- Incumbent
- Assumed office 27 March 2026
- Constituency: Party list

Personal details
- Born: 1978 (age 47–48) Lalitpur, Nepal
- Citizenship: Nepali
- Party: Rastriya Swatantra Party (since 2022)
- Profession: Politician; Entrepreneur

Prabha Karki (Note: Nepali: प्रभा कार्की) (born 1978) is a Nepalese politician and entrepreneur who is member of the 7th Pratinidhi Sabha. She also serves as the managing director, a private cleaning company located in Kathmandu valley. She is a member of Rastriya Swatantra Party and was elected through proportional representation under the Khas Arya female cluster.

== Early life and education ==
Karki was born in Lalitpur, Lalitpur district, Bagmati Province, Nepal, on 1978. Karki earned the SLC, a secondary education certificate, from Lalitpur.

== Political career ==
She joined the Rastriya Swatantra Party in 2022. She was nominated as a proportional representative member of parliament from the Rastriya Swatantra Party in the 2026 Nepalese general election. She is now a member of the Industry, Commerce, Labour and Consumer Welfare parliamentary committee for the Rastriya Swatantra Party in the Pratinidhi Sabha since April 2026.
