= Gyanu Poudyal =

Nepalese Politician

The Honourable Gyanu Poudyal
- ज्ञानु पौड्याल

Member of Parliament, Pratinidhi Sabha
- Incumbent
- Assumed office 27 March 2026
- Constituency: Party list

Personal details
- Born: 1974 (age 51–52) Siddharthanagar, Rupandehi, Nepal
- Citizenship: Nepali
- Party: Rastriya Swatantra Party (since 2025)
- Profession: Politician social activist cooperative banker

Gyanu Poudyal (Note: Nepali: ज्ञानु पौड्याल) (born 1974) is a Nepalese politician, social activist and co-operative banker who is member of the 7th Pratinidhi Sabha. She was president of Jan Utthan Co-Operative Limited, a cooperative banking located in Tilottama, Rupandehi. She is a member of the Rastriya Swatantra Party and was elected through proportional representation under the Khas Arya female cluster.

== Early life and education ==
Poudyal was born in Siddharthanagar, Rupandehi, Lumbini Province, Nepal, on 1974. She completed her bachelor’s degree from Tribhuvan University.

== Professional career ==
Poudyal has 19 years of experience in co-operative banking, entrepreneurship, women's empowerment, children's rights, and social justice.

== Politics ==
She joined the Rastriya Swatantra Party in 2025, to run as a candidate in the by-election for the Rupandehi 3 constituency. She was nominated as a proportional representative member of parliament from the Rastriya Swatantra Party in the 2026 Nepalese general election. She is now a member of the Women and Social Affairs and Committee Consultation and Facilitation parliamentary committee for the Rastriya Swatantra Party in the Pratinidhi Sabha since April 2026.

== Awards and honors ==
- Su-Prabal Janasewa Shree Man Padavi (2022)
- Janasewa Man Padavi (2016)
