= Kushum Maharjan =

Nepalese Politician

The Honourable Kushum Maharjan
- कुसुम महर्जन

Member of Parliament, Pratinidhi Sabha
- Incumbent
- Assumed office 27 March 2026
- Constituency: PR

Personal details
- Born: 1980 (age 45–46) Bhaktapur, Bhaktapur district, Nepal
- Citizenship: Nepali
- Party: Rastriya Swatantra Party (2022-present)
- Profession: Politician social activist

Kushum Maharjan (Nepali: कुसुम महर्जन) is a Nepalese politician and social activist who is member of the 7th Pratinidhi Sabha. She is founding central committee member of the Rastriya Swatantra Party and was elected through proportional representation under the Janajati female cluster. She was elected as a central committee member of Rastriya Swatantra Party from 1st general convention held at Chitwan in 2026.

== Early life and education ==
Maharjan was born in a Newar family in Bhaktapur, Bhaktapur district, Bagmati Province, Nepal, on 1980. She is the daughter of Shankar Maharan and Maiya Maharjan Tuladhar. She completed her bachelor’s degree in business management and master's degree in rural development from Tribhuvan University. She is married to Mahesh Kumar Karanjit from Siddharthanagar, Rupandehi district.

== Professional career ==
Maharjan has experience in women's empowerment, children's rights, and social justice. She is involved in various social organization and fought legal battles for the walefare of children.

== Politics ==
She joined the Rastriya Swatantra Party in 2022 as a founding and central committee member.She ran as a candidate in the by-election for the Rupandehi 3 constituency, but the election was cancelled after the dissolution of the 6th Pratinidhi Sabha. She was nominated as a proportional representative member of parliament from the Rastriya Swatantra Party in the 2026 Nepalese general election. She is now a member of the Education, Health and Information Technology and Science, Technology and Innovation Study parliamentary committee for the Rastriya Swatantra Party in the Pratinidhi Sabha since April 2026.
