= Rachana Khatiwada Khatri =

Nepalese Politician

The Honourable Rachana Khatiwada Khatri
- रचना खतिवडा खत्री

Member of Parliament, Pratinidhi Sabha
- Incumbent
- Assumed office 27 March 2026
- Constituency: Party list

Personal details
- Born: 1975 (age 50–51) Panauti, Kavrepalanchok, Nepal
- Citizenship: Nepali
- Party: Rastriya Swatantra Party
- Spouse: Purushotam Khatiwada
- Profession: Politician; Housewife

Rachana Khatiwada Khatri (née Khatri; Nepali: रचना खतिवडा खत्री) is a Nepalese politician and housewife. She is the mother of Rasik Khatiwada, a Martyr, who died in the 2025 Nepalese Gen Z protests. Rastriya Swatantra Party president Rabi Lamichhane met her and put her name forward for proportional representation in the party in the 2026 general election.

She is currently serving as a member of parliament from the Rastriya Swatantra Party. She is a member of the 7th Pratinidhi Sabha elected through Proportional Representation under the Khas Arya female cluster.

== Early life ==
Khatri was born in Panauti, Kavrepalanchok, Bagmati Province, Nepal. She is married to Purushotam Khatiwada, an employee of Nepal Telecom and both had a two children. Her daughter is studying in Australia, and her son, Rasik, was shot dead during the 2025 Nepalese Gen Z protests. Following the death of her son, she met the then prime minister Sushila Karki regarding justice for the victim families and demanded punishment for the culprit.

== Politics ==
She joined Rastriya Swatantra Party in 2025 after meeting with Rabi Lamichhane. She was nominated as a proportional representative member of parliament from the Rastriya Swatantra Party in the 2026 Nepalese general election. She is now a member of the Law, Justice and Human Rights parliamentary committee for the Rastriya Swatantra Party in the Pratinidhi Sabha since April 2026.
