= Ramesh Prasai =

Nepalese politician, singer and former journalist

- रमेश प्रसाई

Member of Parliament, Pratinidhi Sabha
- Incumbent
- Assumed office 27 March 2026
- Constituency: Party list

Personal details
- Citizenship: Nepalese
- Party: Rastriya Swatantra Party
- Education: Tribhuvan University (BEd)
- Profession: Politician; Journalist; Singer

Ramesh Prasai (Note: Nepali: रमेश प्रसाई) is a Nepalese politician, folk singer and former journalist who has been serving as a member of parliament and co-spokesperson of the Rastriya Swatantra Party. He is a member of 7th Pratinidhi Sabha elected through Proportional Representation under Khas Arya male cluster in the 2026 General Election. Under Khas Arya Cluster, Prasai holds highest number of internal voting with 18,223 votes. He also serves as a party central committee member for the Rastriya Swatantra Party.

Prasai was a former television journalist who worked for defunct media network called Galaxy 4K television and a close ally of Rastriya Swatantra Party chairman Rabi Lamichhane. He holds BEd from Tribhuvan University. He was also known for popularizing and remaking the original Nepali folk song titled Rinkibung Ko Rango of Suresh Gandarbha. On 12 May 2026, Addressing to the parliament meeting of House of representatives, Prasai criticizes the government delay in filing the legal court case against former Prime Minister K.P Sharma Oli and former Home Minister Ramesh Lekhak for their role in 2025 Nepalese Gen Z Protests.
