= Indira Ranamagar =

Nepalese politician and social worker

Indira Rana Magar
- इन्दिरा राना मगर

Deputy Speaker of the Pratinidhi Sabha
- In office 21 January 2023 – 28 December 2025
- President: Bidhya Devi Bhandari; Ram Chandra Poudel
- Prime Minister: Pushpa Kamal Dahal; K. P. Sharma Oli; Sushila Karki
- Speaker: Dev Raj Ghimire
- Preceded by: Pushpa Bhusal Gautam
- Succeeded by: Ruby Kumari Thakur

Member of Parliament, Pratinidhi Sabha
- Incumbent
- Assumed office 26 March 2026
- President: Ram Chandra Poudel
- Preceded by: Dev Raj Ghimire
- Constituency: Jhapa 2
- In office 22 December 2022 – 12 September 2025
- President: Bidhya Devi Bhandari; Ram Chandra Poudel
- Constituency: Party List

Personal details
- Born: 2 July 1970 (age 56) Arjundhara Municipality, Jhapa
- Party: Rastriya Swatantra Party
- Education: Undergraduate in Management
- Occupation: Social Worker, Politician
- Website: indiraranamagar.com; panepal.org

Indira Rana Magar (Note: Nepali: इन्दिरा राना मगर) (born 2 July 1970) is a Nepalese politician and social worker serving as a member of parliament from the Rastriya Swatantra Party. She also served as the Deputy Speaker of the House of Representatives of Nepal from January 2023 to December 2025.

== Early life and career ==
Ranamagar was born on 2 July 1970 (18 Ashad 2027 BS) at Deuniabasti, Jhapa in eastern Nepal. Up to the age of ten, she had to struggle for her early schooling, however she managed to get admission later and graduated from a local school. After the graduation, she worked as a teacher and eventually moved to Kathmandu. There she got influenced by the works of Parijat on the rights of political prisoners. Ranamagar joined Parijat's movement and got acquainted with the Nepalese justice system and the poor conditions in prisons.

== Work with Prisoners Assistance Nepal ==
Ranamagar founded a non-profit organization Prisoners Assistance Nepal in 2000 which assists the children of parents serving sentence in jails. The organization has constructed four children's homes, two schools, and implemented social projects aimed to help prisoners and their children.

== Political career ==
Indira Ranamagar was nominated as a Member of 2nd Federal Parliament of Nepal from Indigenous peoples category by Rastriya Swatantra Party, following the 2022 Nepalese general election.

Indira Ranamagar was elected as the third Deputy Speaker of the Parliament on January 21, 2023. She received a total of 166 votes out of the 264 members present in the House.She resigned from the post on 28 December 2025 to contest for 2026 Nepalese general election.

She is the member of the 3rd Federal Parliament of Nepal elected from Jhapa-2 in 2026 Nepalese General Election securing 60,110 votes and defeating former Speaker of the house Devraj Ghimire.

== Awards and recognitions ==
For her work, Ranamagar has been recognized by various national and international organizations. Some of the major awards she received are:

- Asia 21 Young Leader Public Service Award in 2009.
- World Children’s Honorary Award from the Queen Silvia of Sweden in 2014.
- Nomination for World's Children's Prize in 2014.
- Listed in the BBC's 100 Women in 2017.
