= Krantishikha Dhital =

Nepalese politician and Member of Parliament (born 2026)

The Honourable Krantishikha Dhital
- क्रान्तिशिखा धिताल

Member of Parliament, House of Representatives
- Incumbent
- Assumed office 27 March 2026
- Constituency: PR

Personal details
- Born: Rolpa District, Nepal
- Citizenship: Nepalese
- Party: Rastriya Swatantra Party (since 2025)
- Education: Goldengate College (BA)
- Profession: Politician

Krantishikha Dhital (Note: Nepali: क्रान्तिशिखा धिताल) is a Nepalese journalist, psychosocial counselor, and politician serving as a member of parliament and a whip from the Rastriya Swatantra Party. She was elected as a member of the 7th House of Representatives through the Proportional Representation system from the Khas Arya female cluster in the 2026 General Election. She was also a central committee member of the Rastriya Swatantra Party.

== Personal life ==
Dhital was born in Rolpa, Nepal. She passed her SLC from Shanti Niketan School, Ghorahi, Dang. She moved to Kathmandu for her higher education and completed her Intermediate and bachelor's degrees from Goldengate College, Kathmandu.
