= Dol Prasad Aryal =

Speaker of the parliament of Nepal

- डोलप्रसाद अर्याल
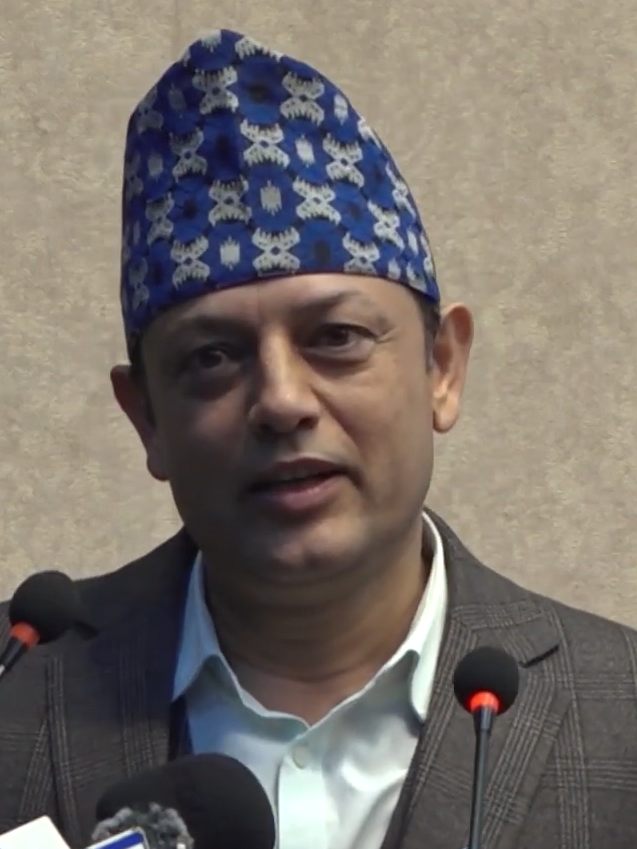
- Aryal in 2024

Speaker of the House of Representatives
- Incumbent
- Assumed office 5 April 2026
- President: Ram Chandra Paudel
- Deputy: Ruby Kumari Thakur
- Preceded by: Dev Raj Ghimire
Ministerial offices
Minister of Labour, Employment and Social Security
In office 4 March 2024 – 15 July 2024
Prime Minister	Pushpa Kamal Dahal
Preceded by	Sharat Singh Bhandari
Succeeded by	Sharat Singh Bhandari
In office 17 January 2023 – 5 February 2023
Prime Minister	Pushpa Kamal Dahal
Preceded by	Sher Bahadur Kunwor
Succeeded by	Sharat Singh Bhandari
Senior party offices
Chairperson of the Rastriya Swatantra Party
Acting; 27 January 2023 – 29 January 2023
Deputy	Himself
Preceded by	Rabi Lamichhane
Succeeded by	Rabi Lamichhane
Vice Chairperson of the Rastriya Swatantra Party
In office 1 July 2022 – 26 June 2026 Serving with Swarnim Wagle (Note: Since 29 November 2023.)
Chairperson	Rabi Lamichhhane
Preceded by	Office established

Member of Parliament, House of Representatives
- Incumbent
- Assumed office 26 March 2026
- Preceded by: Krishna Gopal Shrestha
- Constituency: Kathmandu 9
- In office 22 December 2022 – 12 September 2025
- Constituency: PR list

Personal details
- Born: 22 August 1974 (age 52) Jwalamukhi, Dhading, Kingdom of Nepal
- Party: Rastriya Swatantra

Dol Prasad Aryal (Note: Nepali: डोलप्रसाद अर्याल) (born 22 August 1974) is a Nepalese politician who has been serving as the speaker of the House of Representatives since 2026. He represents the constituency of Kathmandu 9. He previously also served as the Minister of Labour, Employment, and Social Security in Third Dahal Cabinet. A member of the Rastriya Swatantra Party, he served as a vice chairman of the party (alongside Swarnim Wagle) since 2022, until he became speaker of the parliament in 2026. He was also briefly acting party chairman when Rabi Lamichhane was stripped of his citizenship.

== Early life ==
Dol Prasad Aryal was born on 22 August 1974 in Jwalamukhi Rural Municipality, Dhading. The area was formerly the Maidi Village Development Committee. Born to Bhoj Raj Aryal and Gunmaya Aryal, he moved to Kathmandu in search of job opportunities in 1992, finding a job as a restaurant worker. Four years later, in 1996, he went to Japan for foreign employment. He ended up working there for about eight years. Upon his return to Nepal, Aryal became involved in various business ventures in both the education and tourism sectors. He invested in Sumire Tours and Travels, as well as the Yokohama Japanese Language Academy and HEMS School. Aryal also invested in a cooperative, the Jansagar Savings and Credit Cooperative. He was also CEO of Easy Link Remittance, another one of his business ventures.

Outside of business, Aryal has been involved in social work, such as helping establish Raskot Community Hospital in Kalikot. He was also involved in relief efforts during the COVID-19 pandemic by distributing oxygen cylinders.

== Political career ==
Prior to 2022, Aryal was not affiliated with any political party in Nepal. However, while seeking support for the construction of Raskot Community Hospital, he came into contact with Rabi Lamichhane who was then a television presenter. Together with Mukul Dhakal, they concluded that a new political party was needed to reform the Nepali political system, resulting in the formation of the Rastriya Swatantra Party (RSP) in mid-2022 with Aryal becoming vice chairman of the party.

Following the 2022 general election, Aryal became one of the 13 people elected to the 6th House of Representatives representing the RSP from the PR list constituency. The RSP entered into a coalition government after the election, with Pushpa Kamal Dahal as the new prime minister and Lamichhane as deputy prime minister and minister home affairs. Aryal himself was appointed as the minister of labour, employment, and social security. However, in January 2023, the Supreme Court revoked the status of Lamichhane as a member of the House of Representatives. This was caused by his lack of valid Nepali citizenship, resulting in his resignation from all ministerial and party offices, including as chairman of the RSP. Afterwards, he became acting party chairman, as well as parliamentary leader of the RSP. The Supreme Court verdict also led to the withdrawal of the RSP from the coalition government, this included Aryal who left office after only serving around for 20 days. He returned as minister in the same portfolio in March 2024 and served in the position until July 2024, when a coalition government consisting of the Nepali Congress and the Communist Party of Nepal (UML) was formed.

Ahead of the early 2026 general election, Aryal became coordinator of the federal election mobilisation committee of the RSP. He was re-elected to the House of Representatives, though he contested the Kathmandu 9 constituency this time. Aryal won 35,093 votes in the election, defeating his closest rival—Nanumaya Bastola of the Nepali Congress—who only received 5,460 votes. On 5 April 2026, Aryal was elected speaker of the 7th House of Representatives unopposed. The Communist Party of Nepal (UML) had been preparing to field Guru Baral as a candidate against Aryal, though they eventually refrained from doing so. His speakership candidacy was supported by Rabi Lamichhane, as well as by Swarnim Wagle, Sobita Gautam and Sunil Lamsal. Originally, Lamichhane sought to have Aryal become minister of home affairs in the new government. However, Prime Minister Balen Shah wanted his close associate Sunil Lamsal in the position instead. Eventually, a compromise was reached and Aryal became speaker of the House, while Sudan Gurung was appointed minister home affairs.

== Electoral history ==
=== 2026 ===
Candidate	Party	Votes	%
Dol Prasad Aryal	Rastriya Swatantra Party	35,093	69.26
Nanu Maiya Bastola	Nepali Congress	5,460	10.78
Ajay Kranti Shakya	CPN (UML)	4,580	9.04
Dil Kumar Karki	Rastriya Prajatantra Party	1,457	2.88
Rameshwor Shrestha	Ujyaalo Nepal Party	1,426	2.81
Radha Krishna Maharjan	Nepali Communist Party	1,328	2.62
Shanta Maharjan	Nepal Workers Peasants Party	443	0.87
Others		883	1.74
Total		50,670	100.00
Valid votes		50,670	98.19
Invalid/blank votes		933	1.81
Total votes		51,603	100.00
Registered voters/turnout		78,495	65.74
Majority		29,633	
Rastriya Swatantra Party gain			
Source: Election Commission of Nepal
