= Ruby Kumari Thakur =

Nepali politician (born 2000)

- रुबी कुमारी ठाकुर
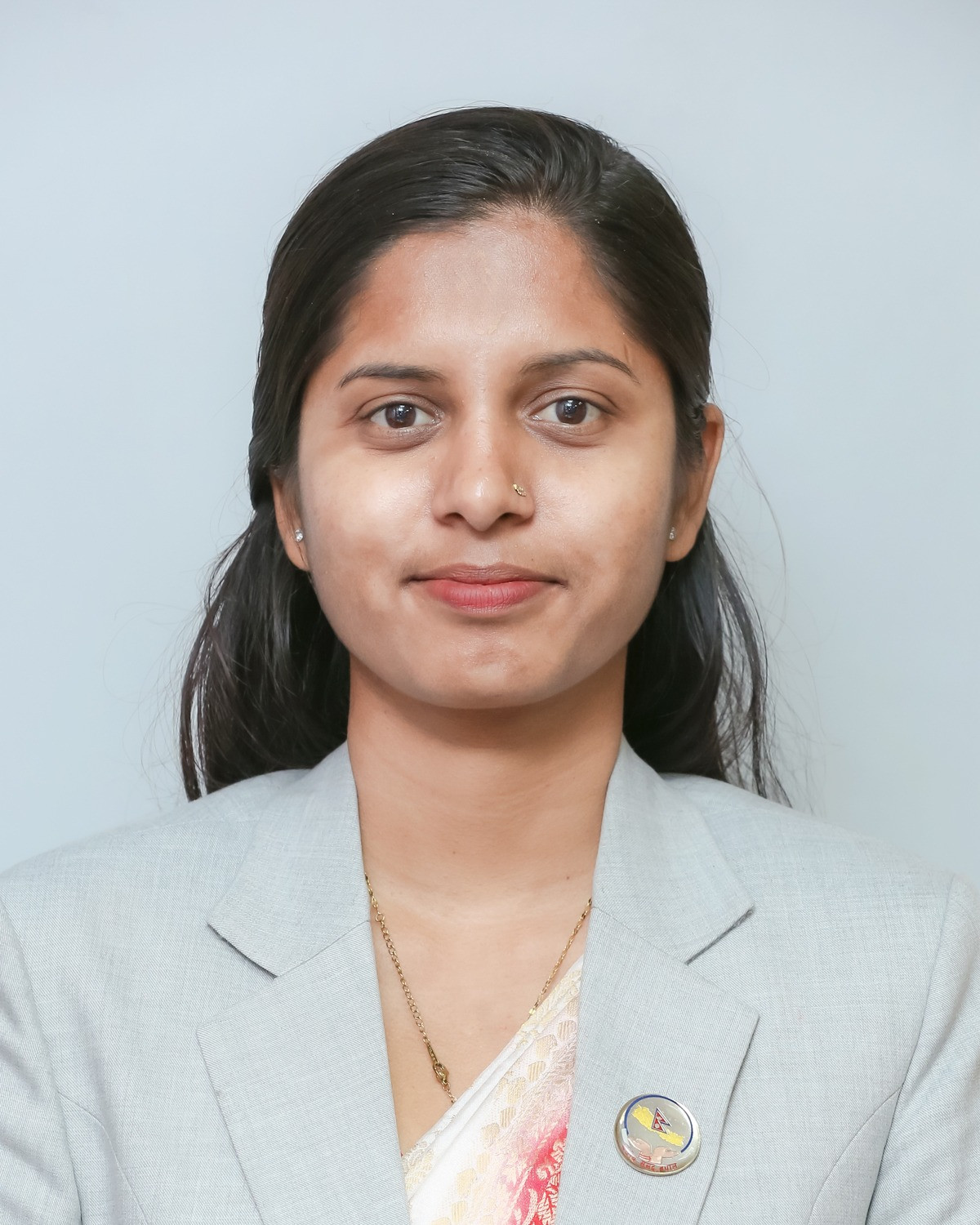
- Official portrait, 2026

Deputy Speaker of the House of Representatives
- Incumbent
- Assumed office 10 April 2026
- President: Ram Chandra Paudel
- Speaker: Dol Prasad Aryal
- Preceded by: Indira Ranamagar

Member of the House of Representatives
- Incumbent
- Assumed office 26 March 2026
- PR group: Madheshi (Women)
- Constituency: Shram Sanskriti Party PR list

Personal details
- Born: May 2000 (age 26) Mujeliya, Dhanusha, Nepal
- Party: Shram Sanskriti Party

Ruby Kumari Thakur (Note: Nepali: रुबी कुमारी ठाकुर; Maithili: 𑒩𑒳𑒥𑒲 𑒏𑒳𑒧𑒰𑒩𑒲 𑒚𑒰𑒏𑒳𑒩 (Tirhuta), 𑂩𑂳𑂥𑂲 𑂍𑂳𑂧𑂰𑂩𑂲 𑂘𑂰𑂍𑂳𑂩 (Kaithi), रुबी कुमारी ठाकुर (Devanagari)) (born 2000) is a Nepalese politician serving as the Deputy Speaker of the House of Representatives since 10th April 2026. She has been a member of the House of Representatives from the Shram Sanskriti Party since 26 March 2026.

== Early life and education ==
Thakur was born in Mujeliya, Dhanusha, Nepal, to Sograth Thakur and Renu Devi Thakur. She did her Schooling and College from Dhanusha and holds a diploma in civil engineering.She rose to public attention at a relatively young age amid her entry into national politics.

== Political career ==
Thakur was elected to the House of Representatives in the 2026 general election through the proportional representation system under the Madheshi women cluster, representing the Shram Sanskriti Party.

In April 2026, she emerged as a candidate for the post of Deputy Speaker, with support from multiple political parties, including backing from the Rastriya Swatantra Party.

Her candidacy was reported as part of broader parliamentary alignments and coalition dynamics during the selection process.

On 10 April 2026, Thakur was elected as Deputy Speaker of the House of Representatives. She is the youngest in Nepal's parliament history to hold the position of Deputy Speaker.

Her rise has been noted in national and international media coverage as reflecting the increasing representation of younger leaders and Madheshi women in Nepal’s federal political institutions.
