= Ankita Thakur =

Nepalese Politician

The Honourable Ankita Thakur

Member of Parliament, Pratinidhi Sabha
- Incumbent
- Assumed office 27 March 2026
- Constituency: PR

Personal details
- Born: Rajbiraj, Saptari District, Nepal
- Citizenship: Nepali
- Party: Rastriya Swatantra Party
- Spouse: Ujwal Thakur
- Relatives: Jay Prakash Thakur (father-in-law)
- Education: Universal College of Medical Sciences, Bachelor of Dental Surgery
- Profession: Politician; Dentist

Ankita Thakur (Nepali: अंकिता ठाकुर) is a Nepalese politician, dentist, who has been serving as a member of parliament from Rastriya Swatantra Party. She is a member of 7th Pratinidhi Sabha elected through Proportional Representation under the Madheshi female cluster in the 2026 general election.

== Early life and education ==
Thakur was born in Rajbiraj, Saptari district of Madhesh Province, Nepal, and belongs to the Maithil Brahmin caste. She moved to Kathmandu at an early age and completed her schooling at Gyan Sikha Boarding High School, Lalitpur. She studied in St. Xavier's College, Maitighar to complete her Higher Secondary Level education in science.

She did her Bachelor of Dental Surgery from Universal College of Medical Sciences, Bhairahawa, Nepal.

== Other works ==
She was the first runner-up of the Mrs. Nepal Culture 2023, a beauty pageant contest.
