= Pramila Kuluju =

Nepalese Politician

The Honourable Pramila Kuluju
- प्रमिला कुलुजु

Member of Parliament, Pratinidhi Sabha
- Incumbent
- Assumed office 27 March 2026
- Constituency: Party list

Personal details
- Born: 1980 (age 45–46) Suryabinayak, Bhaktapur, Nepal
- Citizenship: Nepali
- Party: Rastriya Swatantra Party (2022-)
- Profession: Politician; Entrepreneur

Pramila Kuluju (née Pradhananga; Nepali: प्रमिला कुलुजु) is a Nepalese politician and entrepreneur. She is a founding member of Rastriya Swatantra Party and a member of the central committee. She has been serving as a member of parliament from the Rastriya Swatantra Party. She is a member of 7th Pratinidhi Sabha elected through Proportional Representation under the Janajati female cluster in the 2026 general election.

== Early life and education ==
Kuluju was born in Suryabinayak, Bhaktapur, Bagmati Province, Nepal. She belongs to the Newar ethnic group of Nepal. She is a businesswoman and beautician. She is involved in the clothing business in Bhaktapur.

== Politics ==
She has been a member of the Rastriya Swatantra Party since 2022. She was nominated as a proportional representative member of parliament from the Rastriya Swatantra Party in the 2026 Nepalese general election. She is now a member of the Women and Social Affairs Committee.
