= Dev Raj Ghimire =

Nepali politician

- देवराज घिमिरे
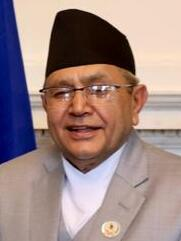
- Official portrait, 2024

Speaker of the Pratinidhi Sabha
- In office 19 January 2023 – 19 January 2026
- President: Bidya Devi Bhandari; Ram Chandra Paudel
- Deputy: Indira Ranamagar
- Preceded by: Agni Prasad Sapkota
- Succeeded by: Dol Prasad Aryal

Member of Parliament, Pratinidhi Sabha
- In office 26 December 2022 – 12 September 2025
- Preceded by: Pabitra Niraula Kharel
- Succeeded by: Indira Ranamagar
- Constituency: Jhapa 2

Personal details
- Born: 26 May 1956 (age 69) Taplejung District
- Party: CPN (UML)

Dev Raj Ghimire is a Nepalese politician who was the Speaker of the House of Representatives of Nepal from 19 January 2023 to 19 January 2026. Ghimire was a member of the 2nd Federal Parliament of Nepal. In the 2022 Nepalese general election, he was elected from the Jhapa 2 (constituency). He is also a standing committee member of the CPN (UML).
