= Bharat Giri =

Nepalese politician

Honourable Bharat Giri MP
- भरत गिरी

Member of Parliament, Pratinidhi Sabha
- Incumbent
- Assumed office March 2026
- Constituency: Party list

Personal details
- Born: 1962 or 1963 (age 63–64)
- Party: Rastriya Prajatantra Party
- Spouse: Jamuna Kumari Khadka
- Parents: Ram Chandra Giri (father); Rukmini Devi Giri (mother)

Bharat Giri is a Nepalese politician who serves as a member of parliament (MP) from Rastriya Prajatantra Party.

== Political career ==
Giri was elected as a central member at Rastriya Prajatantra Party's fifth generation convention in 2013. Giri was elected as the president of the Madhesh provincial committee in November 2021.

Giri was elected to the Pratinidhi Sabha from Rastriya Prajatantra Party at the 2026 general election. He was elected from the party list under the Khas Arya male cluster.
