= Lima Adhikari =

Nepalese politician

Honourable Lima Adhikari Acharya
- लिमा अधिकारी (आचार्य)

Member of Parliament, Pratinidhi Sabha
- Incumbent
- Assumed office 26 March 2026
- Prime Minister: Balendra Shah
- Constituency: Party list (Khas Arya women); Rastriya Swatantra Party

Treasurer of Rastriya Swatantra Party
- In office 29 November 2023 – June 2026
- President: Rabi Lamichhane

Personal details
- Born: Lima Adhikari; 1974 (age 51–52) Kathmandu District, Nepal
- Citizenship: Nepali
- Party: Rastriya Swatantra Party (2023-present)
- Other political affiliations: CPN (Unified Socialist) (September 2021 - February 2023); CPN (UML) (until 2021)
- Spouse: Sudeep Acharya
- Parents: Bharat Mohan Adhikari (father); Sabita Adhikari (mother)
- Relatives: Man Mohan Adhikari (uncle)
- Education: Huazhong University of Science and Technology (Master of Business Administration)
- Profession: Politician

Lima Adhikari Acharya (née Adhikari; Nepali: लिमा अधिकारी (आचार्य)) is a Nepalese politician and a former treasurer of the Rastriya Swatantra Party. She is a member of the House of Representatives of Nepal, elected through the proportional representation system in the 2026 general election from the Khas Arya cluster.

== Early life and family ==
She is the daughter of former deputy prime minister and finance minister Bharat Mohan Adhikari and Sabita Adhikari.

== Political career ==
Adhikari initially entered politics through the Communist Party of Nepal (Unified Socialist), led by Madhav Kumar Nepal. She later joined the Rastriya Swatantra Party (RSP), where she became a central committee member and subsequently the party’s treasurer. In the 2026 Nepalese general election, she was elected to the House of Representatives under the proportional representation (PR) system.
