= Capital punishment in Nepal =

Nepal on the map

Capital punishment in Nepal has been abolished.

Following a fifteen-year suspension, capital punishment for crimes under the country's common law was abolished by legal reform in 1946, remaining in force only for treason, assaulting the king or royal family, taking up arms to overthrow the government, or conspiring with a foreign state to undermine the independence of Nepal. It was later also reinstated for murder and terrorism in 1985. Full abolition by constitutional amendment came into force on 9 November 1991.

Article 12 of the Constitution of the Kingdom of Nepal (1990) states: "No law shall be made which provides for capital punishment."

The last execution in Nepal took place in 1979. The National Penal Code, 2017 (2074) has set out the types of punishment permissible in Nepal: Imprisonment for Life, Imprisonment, Fine, Imprisonment and Fine, Compensation, Imprisonment for the failure to pay a fine or compensation, and Community Service in lieu of imprisonment.

== Reasons for abolition ==
According to a study by Cornell Law School, one of the key factors leading to the abolition was a 15-year period of monitored experimental abolition, which involved a moratorium on executions for common law offenses, during which crime rates remained stable, reassuring the public and the policy makers and paving the way for abolition for ordinary crimes in 1946.

The study also notes that the transition to a multi-party constitutional monarchy, in 1990, "provided a propitious context for abolition", seen as part of a broad program of human rights reform aimed at breaking with the past.
