= Purna Prasad Limbu =

Nepalese politician

Honourable Purna Prasad Limbu
- पूर्णप्रसाद लिम्बू

Member of Parliament, Pratinidhi Sabha
- Elected
- Assumed office March 2026
- Constituency: Party list

Personal details
- Born: 1963 or 1964 (age 62–63) Chainpur, Sankhuwasabha District, Nepal
- Party: Shram Sanskriti

Military service
- Branch/service: British Army
- Years of service: 1980–2008
- Rank: Captain
- Battles/wars: Falklands War

Purna Prasad Limbu is a Nepalese politician and former British Gorkha who serves as a member of parliament (MP) from Shram Sanskriti Party.

== Military career ==
Limbu became a British Gorkha in May 1980. Limbu was involved in the Falklands War in 1982. He also completed operational tours in Bosnia and Herzegovina and Afghanistan. He retired from service in 2008. After retirement he served as a welfare officer for the Gorkha Welfare Trust in Bhojpur and Khandbari. He became senior welfare office of Dharan and later Kathmandu.

== Political career ==
He was elected to the Pratinidhi Sabha from Shram Sanskriti Party at the 2026 general election. He was elected from the Party list under the Janajati cluster.

== Personal life ==
Limbu is married and has two children who reside in the United Kingdom.
