= Radhika Ramtel =

Nepalese politician

Honourable Radhika Ramtel
- राधिका रम्तेल

Member of Parliament, Pratinidhi Sabha
- Elected
- Assumed office March 2026
- Constituency: Party list

Personal details
- Born: 1982 (age 43–44) Babiyachaur, Surkhet, Nepal
- Party: Shram Sanskriti
- Spouse: Santosh Kumar Ramtel
- Parents: Balsingh Sarki (father); Pabitra Sarki (mother)

Radhika Ramtel is a Nepalese politician who serves as a Member of Parliament from the Shram Sanskriti Party.

== Early life ==
She was born in Babiyachaur, Surkhet and has six siblings. She was a child bride.

== Political career ==
Ramtel was elected to the Pratinidhi Sabha from the Shram Sanskriti Party in the 2026 general election. She was elected from the party list under the Dalit female cluster.
