= B. P. Koirala Institute of Health Sciences =

Public medical research university and hospital in Dharan, Nepal

- वी. पी. कोइराला स्वास्थ्य विज्ञान प्रतिष्ठान
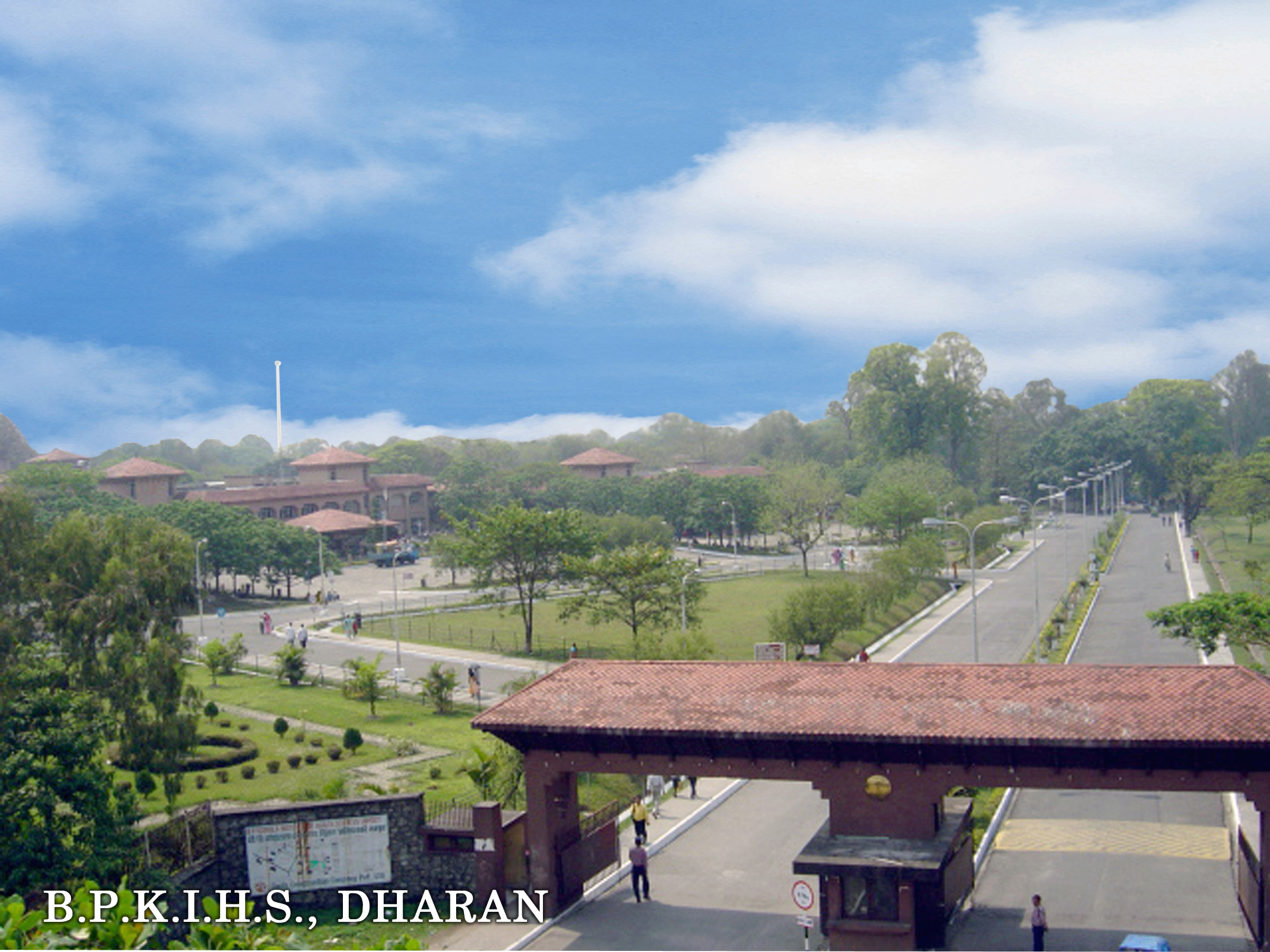
- Type: Deemed
- Established: 18 January 1993; 33 years ago
- Chancellor: Prime Minister of Nepal
- Vice-Chancellor: Prof. Dr Smriti Karki
- Faculty: 375
- Undergraduates: 1200
- Location: Dharan, Nepal; 26.808291°N 87.26655°E
- Website: bpkihs.edu

B.P. Koirala Institute of Health Sciences (BPKIHS) (Nepali: वी.पी. कोइराला स्वास्थ्य विज्ञान प्रतिष्ठान) popularly known as Ghopa Camp, is a Nepalese autonomous health sciences university. It is located in the sub-metropolitan city of Dharan in Sunsari District. The Institute is a Nepal-India cooperation. The Institute serves the health education needs of the eastern region of Nepal at primary, secondary and tertiary levels.

The Institute comprises four colleges: the Faculty of Medicine, the College of Dental Surgery, the College of Nursing, and the School of Public Health and Community Medicine. The Institute also operates a 913-bed Teaching Hospital, offering postgraduate, undergraduate and university certificate programs. The Institute grants Bachelor's, Master's, Doctoral degrees like Doctorate of Medicine (DM), and several other certificates. The MBBS program began on March 10, 1994, while the postgraduate programs began in 1999.

== History ==
Established in January 18, 1993, the institute was named after the late former Prime Minister of Nepal Bishweshwar Prasad Koirala. The institute became an Autonomous Health Sciences University on October 28, 1998. The Institute took over the management of the 150-bed Eastern Regional Hospital, a Public Hospital, in 1993. The University raised the number of beds to 700 and added a coronary care unit and intensive care unit facilities, as well as a critical care area, and observational beds. MRI, CT-scan, emergency laboratory, C-arm, mobile X-ray are among the facilities. A sterilization section and operation theatres with recovery room facilities were also added.

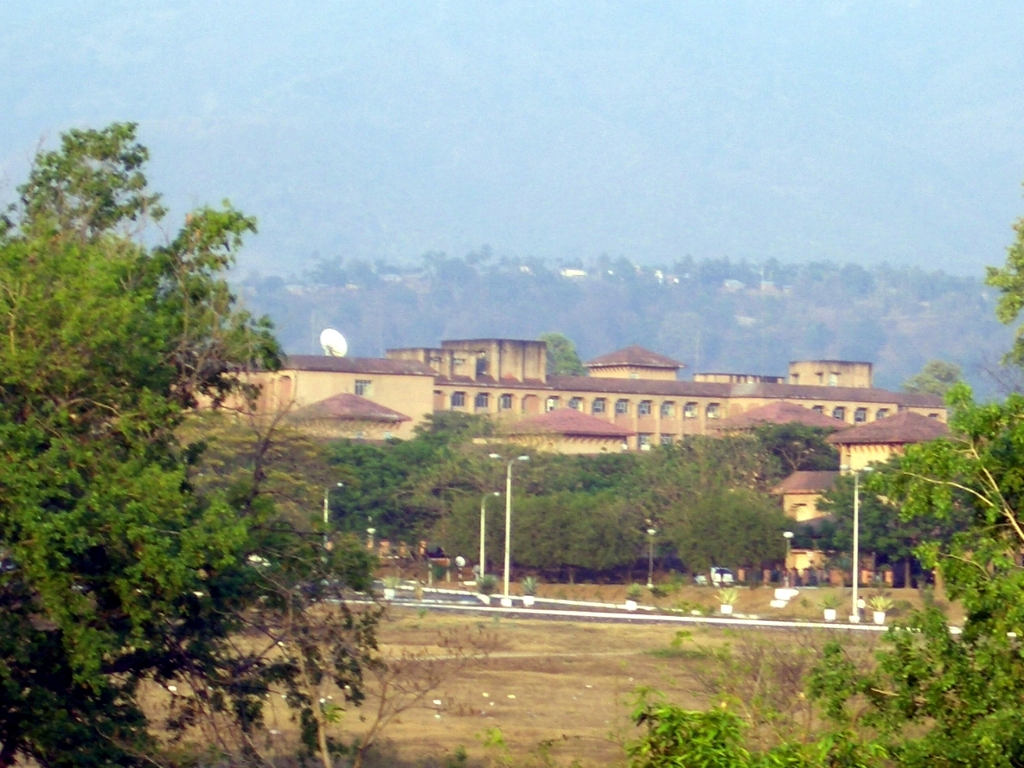
College from the hostel terrace

The Bachelor of Medicine, Bachelor of Surgery (MBBS) programme of BPKIHS started in 1994 with the course duration of 5.5 years. It is listed in the World Directory of Medical Schools, and the MBBS qualification is recognized by the Medical Council of India.

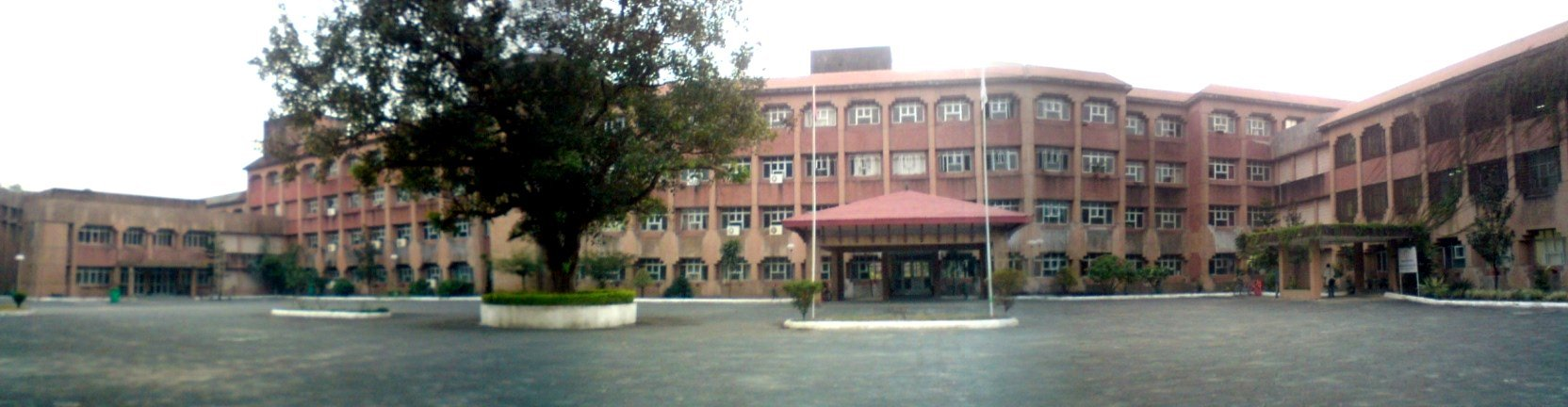
Medical college building

and was transformed into an Autonomous Health Sciences University in 1998. In 2010, the foundation stone was laid for a new college block, funded by the Government of India.

In July 2026, Prof. Dr. Smriti Karki was appointed Vice-Chancellor of B.P. Koirala Institute of Health Sciences following an open, competitive selection process conducted under the Integrated Procedure for the Selection and Recommendation of Vice-Chancellors of Health Science Academies, 2026. Her appointment followed a nationwide restructuring of leadership at Nepal's government health science academies after an ordinance issued in May 2026. She became the first woman to serve as Vice-Chancellor in the institute's history. Prof. Karki is an alumna of B.P. Koirala Institute of Health Sciences and previously served as Head of the Department of Pathology and as a member of the institute's Executive Committee.

== Academic programmes ==
- Undergraduate programmes
  - Bachelor of Medicine and Bachelor of Surgery (MBBS)
  - Bachelor of Dental Surgery (BDS)
  - Bachelor of Science in Nursing (BSc. Nursing)
  - Bachelor of Science in Medical Imaging Technology (B.Sc. MIT)
  - Bachelor of Science in Medical Laboratory Technology (B.Sc. MLT)
  - Bachelor of Science in Perfusion Technology (B.Sc. PT)
  - Bachelor of Science in Midwifery (B.Sc. Midwifery)
- Postgraduate programmes
  - Master in Surgery (MS)
    - MS General Surgery
    - MS Ophthalmology
    - MS Otorhinolaryngology and Head and Neck Surgery
    - MS Orthopaedics
  - MD programmes
    - MD General Practice and Emergency Medicine
    - MD Internal Medicine
    - MD Dermatology, Venereology and Leprology
    - MD Pediatrics and Adolescent Medicine
    - MD Obstetrics and Gynaecology
    - MD Radiodiagnosis and Imaging
    - MD in Basic Sciences (Anatomy, Physiology, Biochemistry, Pathology, Microbiology, Pharmacology, Forensic Medicine and Toxicology, and Community Medicine).
  - Master in Public Health (MPH)
  - Master in Dental Surgery (MDS)
  - MSc Nursing
  - MSc Basic Sciences (Human Anatomy, Physiology, Biochemistry, and Microbiology)
- Superspeciality programmes (DM/MCh program)
  - DM Cardiology
  - DM Gastroenterology and Hepatology
  - DM Neonatology
  - DM Pulmonary, Sleep and Critical Care Medicine
  - MCh Urology
  - MCh GI and Hepatobiliary Surgery
  - MCh Cardiothoracic and Vascular Surgery

== Medical facilities ==
A Cath lab from Philips (Allura FC) provides coronary catheterization and angiography. Logistics and training were provided with the support of Geneva University.

=== Dentistry ===
The institute has a separate College of Dental Surgery that accepts 60 students for the Bachelor of Dental Surgery program every year through competitive entrance examinations. A total of nine separate Dental Departments function smoothly in the university premises that are as follows:

- Department of Oral Medicine and Radiology
- Department of Oral and Maxillofacial Surgery
- Department of Prosthodontics
- Department of Pedodontics and Preventive Dentistry
- Department of Orthodontics and Dentofacial Orthopedics
- Department of Public Health Dentistry
- Department of Periodontology and Implant Dentistry
- Department of Conservative Dentistry and Endodontics
- Department of Oral Pathology and Microbiology

A Postgraduate degree in Dentistry, MDS in those disciplines are available.

=== Hospital services ===
The services offered at the university hospital include:

- In-patient services
- Emergency Hospital Services
- DOTS TB Clinic (expanded as Directly Observed Treatment Short course Tuberculosis Clinic)
- Public Health and Social Services
- Institutional Practice
- Radiology and Laboratory Services
- OT (operating theater) and Minor Procedure Services
- OPD (Outpatient Department) Services

== Notables ==
- Ramesh Bijlani, former Professor of Physiology at AIIMS
- Tirath Das Dogra, former Director of AIIMS and an authority on forensic medicine
- Ojashwi Sherchan, MP from Rastriya Swatantra Party.
