= Tahir Ali Bhat =

Nepalese politician

Honourable Tahir Ali Bhat MP
- ताहिर अली भाट

Member of Parliament, Pratinidhi Sabha
- Incumbent
- Assumed office March 2026
- Constituency: Party list

Personal details
- Born: 1964 or 1965 (age 61–62)
- Party: Rastriya Prajatantra Party

Tahir Ali Bhat is a Nepalese politician who serves as a member of parliament (MP) from Rastriya Prajatantra Party.

== Political career ==
Ali was elected as chairman of the free student union at Shree Ram Naresh Adarsha High School in 1980.

He contested for chair of Rohini rural municipality in 2017 and 2022, but lost both times.

Ali was elected to the Pratinidhi Sabha from Rastriya Prajatantra Party at the 2026 general election. He was elected from the party list under the Muslim male cluster.
