= Taman Khola Rural Municipality =

Tamankhola Rural Municipality तमानखोला गाउँपालिका
- Gaunpalika
- Location in Nepal
- Coordinates: 28.395104°N 83.251925°E
- Country: Nepal
- Province: Gandaki
- District: Baglung District
- Time zone: UTC+5:45 (Nepal Time)
- Website: http://tamankholamun.gov.np/

Tamankhola Rural Municipality (Tamankola Gaupalika) (Nepali: तमानखोला गाउँपालिका) is a Gaunpalika in Baglung District in Gandaki Province of Nepal. On 12 March 2017, the government of Nepal implemented a new local administrative structure, in which VDCs have been replaced with municipal and Village Councils. Tamankhola is one of these 753 local units.
