= Gandaki Rural Municipality =

Gaunpalika in Gandaki, Nepal

Gandaki Rural Municipality गण्डकी गाउँपालिका
- Gaunpalika
- Location in Nepal
- Coordinates: 28.034678°N 84.717929°E
- Country: Nepal
- Province: Gandaki
- District: Gorkha District

Area
  - Total: 123.86 km^{2} (47.82 sq mi)

Population
  - Total: 23,262
  - Density: 187.81/km^{2} (486.42/sq mi)
- Time zone: UTC+5:45 (Nepal Time)
- Website: http://gandakimun.gov.np

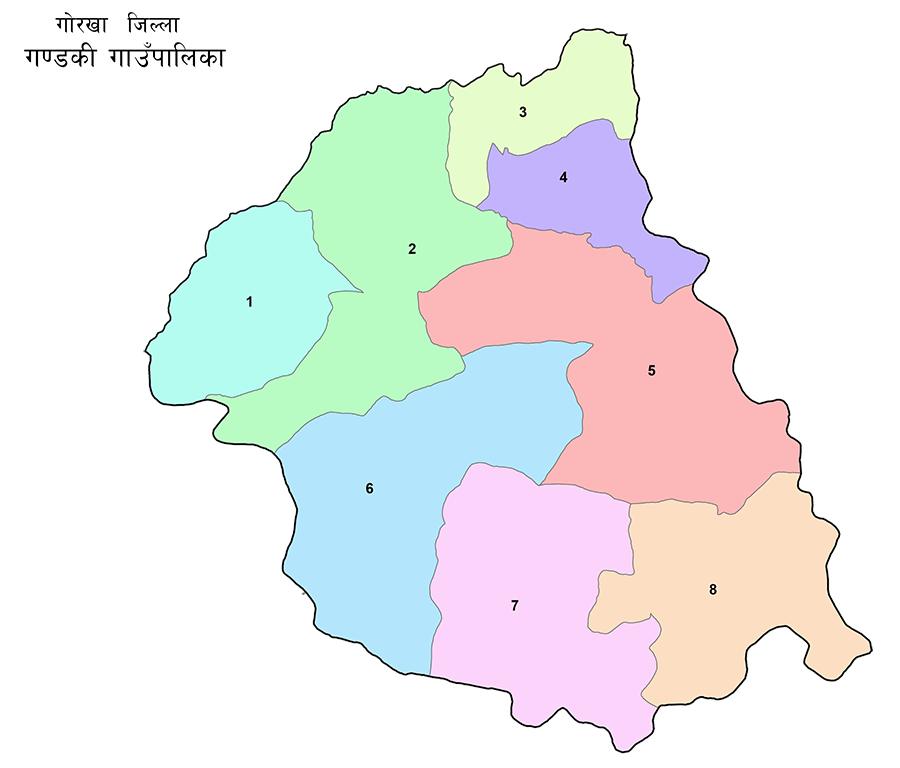
Ward-level map of Gandaki rural municipality, Nepal.

Gandaki Rural Municipality (Nepali :गण्डकी गाँउपालिका) is a Gaunpalika in Gorkha District in Gandaki Province of Nepal. On 12 March 2017, the government of Nepal implemented a new local administrative structure, with the implementation of the new local administrative structure, VDCs have been replaced with municipal and Village Councils. Gandaki is one of these 753 local units.

== Demographics ==
At the time of the 2011 Nepal census, Gandaki Rural Municipality had a population of 23,262. Of these, 75.8% spoke Nepali, 15.3% Magar, 5.5% Chepang, 2.5% Gurung, 0.6% Newar, 0.2% Urdu and 0.2% other languages as their first language.

In terms of ethnicity/caste, 19.2% were Magar, 18.7% Hill Brahmin, 13.2% Newar, 13.0% Chepang/Praja, 12.7% Gurung, 5.8% Sarki, 5.2% Chhetri, 4.5% Kami, 3.3% Damai/Dholi, 1.1% Brahmu/Baramo, 1.1% Gharti/Bhujel, 1.0% Majhi, 0.5% Musalman, 0.2% Kumal, 0.2% Sanyasi/Dasnami, 0.1% Tamang and 0.2% others.

In terms of religion, 85.6% were Hindu, 9.6% Buddhist, 2.4% Prakriti, 1.8% Christian, 0.5% Muslim and 0.1% others.

In terms of literacy, 65.5% could both read and write, 2.3% could read but not write and 32.2% could neither read nor write.
