= Jhapa 2 =

Parliamentary constituency in Province No. 1, Nepal

- Parliamentary constituency
- Jhapa 2 in Koshi Province
- Province: Koshi
- District: Jhapa

Current constituency
- Created: 1991
- Party: CPN (Unified Marxist–Leninist)
- Member of Parliament: Indira Ranamagar (RSP)
- Koshi MPA 2(A): Ek Raj Karki
- Koshi MPA 2(B): Tilchan Pathak

Jhapa 2 is one of five parliamentary constituencies of Jhapa District in Nepal. This constituency came into existence on the Constituency Delimitation Commission (CDC) report submitted on 31 August 2017.

== Incorporated areas ==
Jhapa 2 incorporates Arjundhara Municipality, wards 1–9 of Birtamod Municipality, wards 8 and 9 of Kankai Municipality and wards 1-2–3 of Buddhashanti Rural Municipality.

== Assembly segments ==
It encompasses the following Province No. 1 Provincial Assembly segment

- Jhapa 2(A)
- Jhapa 2(B)

== Members of Parliament ==
=== Parliament/Constituent Assembly ===
Election	Member	Party
1991	Devi Prasad Ojha	CPN (Unified Marxist–Leninist)
1994	Chandra Prakash Mainali	CPN (Unified Marxist–Leninist)
March 1998	Chandra Prakash Mainali	CPN (Marxist–Leninist)
1999	K.P. Sharma Oli	CPN (Unified Marxist–Leninist)
2008	Gauri Shankar Khadka	CPN (Maoist)
January 2009	Gauri Shankar Khadka	UCPN (Maoist)
2013	Sudhir Kumar Siwakoti	Nepali Congress
2017	Pabitra Niraula Kharel	CPN (Unified Marxist–Leninist)
May 2018	Pabitra Niraula Kharel	Nepal Communist Party
March 2021	Pabitra Niraula Kharel	CPN (Unified Marxist–Leninist)
2022	Dev Raj Ghimire	CPN (Unified Marxist–Leninist)
2026	Indira Ranamagar	Rastriya Swatantra Party

=== Provincial Assembly ===
==== 2(A) ====
Election	Member	Party
2017	Ek Raj Karki	CPN (Unified Marxist-Leninist)
May 2018	Ek Raj Karki	Nepal Communist Party
March 2021	Ek Raj Karki	CPN (Unified Marxist–Leninist)

==== 2(B) ====
Election	Member	Party
2017	Brikha Bahadur Pradhan	CPN (Unified Marxist-Leninist)
May 2018	Brikha Bahadur Pradhan	Nepal Communist Party
March 2021	Brikha Bahadur Pradhan	CPN (Unified Marxist–Leninist)

== Election results ==
=== Election in the 2020s ===
==== 2026 general election ====
Candidate	Party	Votes	%
Indira Ranamagar	Rastriya Swatantra Party	60,110	65.82
Dev Raj Ghimire	CPN (UML)	11,368	12.45
Keshav Kumar Bhandari	Shram Sanskriti Party	7,291	7.98
Sarita Prasai	Nepali Congress	5,616	6.15
Bhadra Prasad Nepal	Rastriya Prajatantra Party	3,966	4.34
Dharmashila Chapagain	Nepali Communist Party	1,115	1.22
Chuda Karn Begha	Ujyaalo Nepal Party	560	0.61
Ramesh Kumar Rajbanshi	Janamat Party	380	0.42
Yuvraj Sangroula	Independent	305	0.33
Akal Bahadur Tamang	Mongol National Organisation	148	0.16
Others		464	0.51
Total		91,323	100.00
Valid votes		91,323	95.33
Invalid/blank votes		4,469	4.67
Total votes		95,792	100.00
Registered voters/turnout		147,522	64.93
Majority		48,742	
Rastriya Swatantra Party hold			

==== 2022 general election ====
Candidate	Party	Votes	%
Dev Raj Ghimire	CPN (UML)	28,716	35.14
Bhadra Prasad Nepal	Independent	26,455	32.37
Hari Kumar Rana Magar	CPN (Maoist Centre)	13,930	17.05
Rudra Prasad Giri	Rastriya Swatantra Party	8,781	10.75
Others		3,839	4.70
Total		81,721	100.00
Majority		2,261	
CPN (UML) hold			

==== 2022 provincial election ====
===== 2(A) =====
Candidate	Party	Votes	%
Ekraj Karki	CPN (UML)	18,758	53.19
Pushparaj Pokharel	CPN (Unified Socialist)	6,110	17.33
Bhakta Bahadur Bhujel	Hamro Nepali Party	3,246	9.20
Bhim Prasad Sharma	Sanghiya Loktantrik Rastriya Manch	2,453	6.96
Durga Prasad Dahal	CPN (Marxist–Leninist)	1,595	4.52
Kamal Sitaula	Nepali Congress (B.P.)	1,145	3.25
Dev Narayan Dhimal	Mongol National Organisation	749	2.12
Others	1,208	3.43	
Total		35,264	100.00
Majority		12,648	
CPN (UML)			

===== 2(B) =====
Candidate	Party	Votes	%
Tilchan Pathak	CPN (UML)	20,200	44.18
Khagendra Mainali	Nepali Congress	16,359	35.78
Anindra Timasina	Independent	2,617	5.72
Dhan Bahadur Bhujel	Sanghiya Loktantrik Rastriya Manch	2,455	5.37
Baburam Paudel	नेCPN (Marxist–Leninist)	1,051	2.30
Mangal Singh Limbu	Mongol National Organisation	950	2.08
Ramesh Karki	Nepali Congress (B.P.)	925	2.02
Bijay Ingnam	Rastriya Janamukti Party	813	1.78
Others	351	0.77	
Total		45,721	100.00
Majority		3,841	
CPN (UML)			

=== Election in the 2010s ===
==== 2017 legislative elections ====
Party	Candidate	Votes
CPN (Unified Marxist–Leninist)	Pabitra Niraula Kharel	45,817
Nepali Congress	Udhhav Thapa	32,050
Bibeksheel Sajha Party	Nabin Bastola	1,105
Others		2,985
Invalid votes		3,699
Result	CPN (UML) gain	
Source: Election Commission

==== 2017 Nepalese provincial elections ====
===== 2(A) =====
Party	Candidate	Votes
CPN (Unified Marxist–Leninist)	Ek Raj Karki	21,284
Nepali Congress	Laxman Khadka	12,722
Others		2,003
Invalid votes		1,318
Result	CPN (UML) gain	
Source: Election Commission

===== 2(B) =====
Party	Candidate	Votes
CPN (Unified Marxist–Leninist)	Brikha Bahadur Pradhan	25,461
Nepali Congress	Khang Prasad Prasai	18,240
Others		2,933
Invalid votes		1,601
Result	CPN (UML) gain	
Source: Election Commission

==== 2013 Constituent Assembly election ====
Party	Candidate	Votes
Nepali Congress	Sudhir Kumar Siwakoti	13,554
CPN (Unified Marxist–Leninist)	Pabitra Niraula Kharel	12,825
UCPN (Maoist)	Purna Prasad Rajbanshi	10,108
Rastriya Prajatantra Party Nepal	Bhakti Prasad Situala	6,710
Federal Socialist Party, Nepal	Bhupal Bahadur Rai	1,012
Others		2,605
Result	Congress gain	
Source: NepalNews

=== Election in the 2000s ===
==== 2008 Constituent Assembly election ====
Party	Candidate	Votes
CPN (Maoist)	Gauri Shankar Khadka	18,580
Nepali Congress	Sudhir Kumar Siwakoti	13,843
CPN (Unified Marxist–Leninist)	Menuka Pokharel Kafle	9,168
CPN (Marxist–Leninist)	Bhaskar Kafle	2,716
Others		4,069
Invalid votes		2,978
Result	Maoist gain	
Source: Election Commission

=== Election in the 1990s ===
==== 1999 legislative elections ====
Party	Candidate	Votes
CPN (Unified Marxist–Leninist)	K.P. Sharma Oli	18,909
Nepali Congress	Giriraj Kumari Prasai	18,892
CPN (Marxist–Leninist)	Chandra Prakash Mainali	10,199
Rastriya Janamukti Party	Sanjuhang Palungwa Limbu	2,727
Rastriya Prajatantra Party	Hari Nath Bastola	1,143
Others		1,174
Invalid Votes		2,001
Result	CPN (UML) hold	
Source: Election Commission

==== 1994 legislative elections ====
Party	Candidate	Votes
CPN (Unified Marxist–Leninist)	Chandra Prakash Mainali	18,863
Nepali Congress	Ram Babu Prasai	12,456
Rastriya Prajatantra Party	Jay Narayan Dhungana	6,247
Rastriya Janamukti Party	Bal Bahadur Idnam	2,072
Nepal Sadbhawana Party	Kameshwar Dutta	1,087
Others		529
Result	CPN (UML) hold	
Source: Election Commission

==== 1991 legislative elections ====
Party	Candidate	Votes
CPN (Unified Marxist–Leninist)	Devi Prasad Ojha	20,646
Nepali Congress	C.K. Prasai	12,382
Result	CPN (UML) gain	

== See also ==
- List of parliamentary constituencies of Nepal
