= Tika Sangraula =

Nepalese politician

Honourable Tika Sangraula
- टिका संग्रौला

Member of Parliament for Rastriya Swatantra Party
- Incumbent
- Assumed office 27 March 2026
- Constituency: PR

Personal details
- Party: Rastriya Swatantra Party
- Other political affiliations: Rastriya Swatantra Party
- Children: 1

Tika Sangraula (Note: Nepali: टिका संग्रौला) is a Nepalese politician, belonging to the Rastriya Swatantra Party. She is currently serving as a member of the Federal Parliament of Nepal. she was appointed as a representative of people in Nepal by Khas Arya Quota System.
