= Ambika Devi Sangraula =

Nepalese politician

Honourable Ambika Devi Sangraula
- अम्बिकादेवी संग्रौला

Member of Parliament, Pratinidhi Sabha
- Elected
- Assumed office March 2026
- Constituency: Party list

Personal details
- Born: 1975 (age 50–51) Tehrathum District, Nepal
- Party: Shram Sanskriti
- Spouse: Surendra Khadka
- Parents: Adi Mardan Sangraula (father); Renuka Sangraula (mother)

Ambika Devi Sangraula is a Nepalese politician who serves as a member of parliament (MP) from Shram Sanskriti Party.

== Early life ==
Sangraula was born in Tehrathum District to an Indian Army officer. She grew up in Kamal, Jhapa District. She completed her SLC in 1992 and got her IA from Damak Multiple Campus in 1995 following which she moved to Dharan with her family.

== Political career ==
Sangraula was elected to the Pratinidhi Sabha from Shram Sanskriti Party at the 2026 general election. She was elected from the party list under the Khas Arya female cluster.

== Personal life ==
She is married and has two children and lives in Dharan-13, Amarpath.
