= 10+2 =

Secondary level education in Nepal and India

10+2 refers to the 2 years of schooling which is required post grade 10, adopted by high schools in Nepal. 10+2 is gradually replacing the conventional modes of intermediate education, being the Intermediate of Science (I. Sc.), Intermediate of Commerce (I. Comm.), Intermediate of Arts/Humanities (I. A.) normally taken by Students after having received their School Leaving Certificate (SLC) provided by Tribhuvan University. Students in Nepal either opt for a 10+2 course in the science, management, and humanities stream under the National Examination Board, or opt for other options like the British A-Levels curriculum under Cambridge University.

In India, in July 2020, the passage of the National Education Policy 2020 replaced the 10+2 system with the 5+3+3+4 system. The 10+2 system is a part of the K-12 education system, and equivalent to the International Baccalaureate and GCE Advanced Levels in the west. 10+2 refers to two years of schooling post grade 10 in India since autumn 2002.

In India each state has State secondary education boards. Following are some Boards offering 10+2:

- Board of High School and Intermediate Education Uttar Pradesh.
- Goa Board of Secondary & Higher Secondary Education
- Maharashtra State Board of Secondary and Higher Secondary Education, Pune
- Board of Intermediate Education, Andhra Pradesh.
- Telangana Board of Intermediate Education.
- State Board of School Examinations (Sec.) & Board of Higher Secondary Examinations, Tamil Nadu
