= Dalit people in Nepal =

Caste-based groups in Nepal

Dalit people of Nepal
Total population
- 4,122,639 (13.6% of population)

Regions with significant populations
- Nepal (Hill and Terai regions)

Languages
- Nepali, Maithili, Bhojpuri, Bajjika, Awadhi

Religion
- Hinduism, Buddhism, Christianity

Related ethnic groups
- Janajati people, Madheshi people

Dalit people (Nepali: दलित समुदाय) in Nepal are communities historically marginalized under the traditional Hindu caste system and subjected to "untouchability." According to the 2021 Census of Nepal, they comprise approximately 13.6% of the national population, though Dalit advocacy groups often suggest the actual figure may be higher.

The term "Dalit" was formally adopted in Nepal during the 1960s as a unifying political identity to represent various groups that were previously categorized as "untouchable" (Paani Nachalne) under the Muluki Ain of 1854.

== Classification ==
The National Dalit Commission (NDC) of Nepal recognizes 26 distinct sub-castes, which are categorized into two primary geographic clusters:

=== Hill Dalits ===
- Kami: Traditionally ironsmiths and goldsmiths.
- Damai: Traditionally tailors and musicians (players of the Panche Baja).
- Sarki: Traditionally leatherworkers.
- Gaine (Gandharba): Traditional folk singers and players of the Sarangi.
- Badi: Historically known for music and entertainment.

=== Madhesi Dalits ===
Residing in the southern Terai plains, these groups include:

- Chamar: Traditionally leatherworkers and agricultural laborers.
- Musahar: Primarily engaged in agriculture and brickmaking.
- Paswan (Dusadh): A large community within the Terai Dalit population.
- Tatma, Khatwe, and Dom: Other significant groups in the Madhesh region.

== Legal Status and Rights ==
The Constitution of Nepal (2015) provides specific safeguards for Dalit people under Article 40, which outlines the "Rights of Dalits." This includes the right to proportional participation in all state bodies and special provisions for education and health.

Furthermore, the **Caste-based Discrimination and Untouchability (Offence and Punishment) Act, 2011 criminalizes discrimination in both public and private spheres, providing a legal framework for the prosecution of caste-based crimes.

== Social Challenges ==
Despite constitutional protections, Dalit people in Nepal continue to face challenges including social exclusion, limited access to land ownership, and higher rates of poverty compared to the national average. Advocacy groups like the Feminist Dalit Organization (FEDO) and the Jagaran Media Center work to address these systemic issues and promote Dalit representation in media and politics.

== See also ==
- Caste system in Nepal
- National Dalit Commission
- Janajati
