= Member of Parliament, Pratinidhi Sabha =

Democratically elected representative in the bicameral Federal Parliament of Nepal

- प्रतिनिधि सभा सदस्य
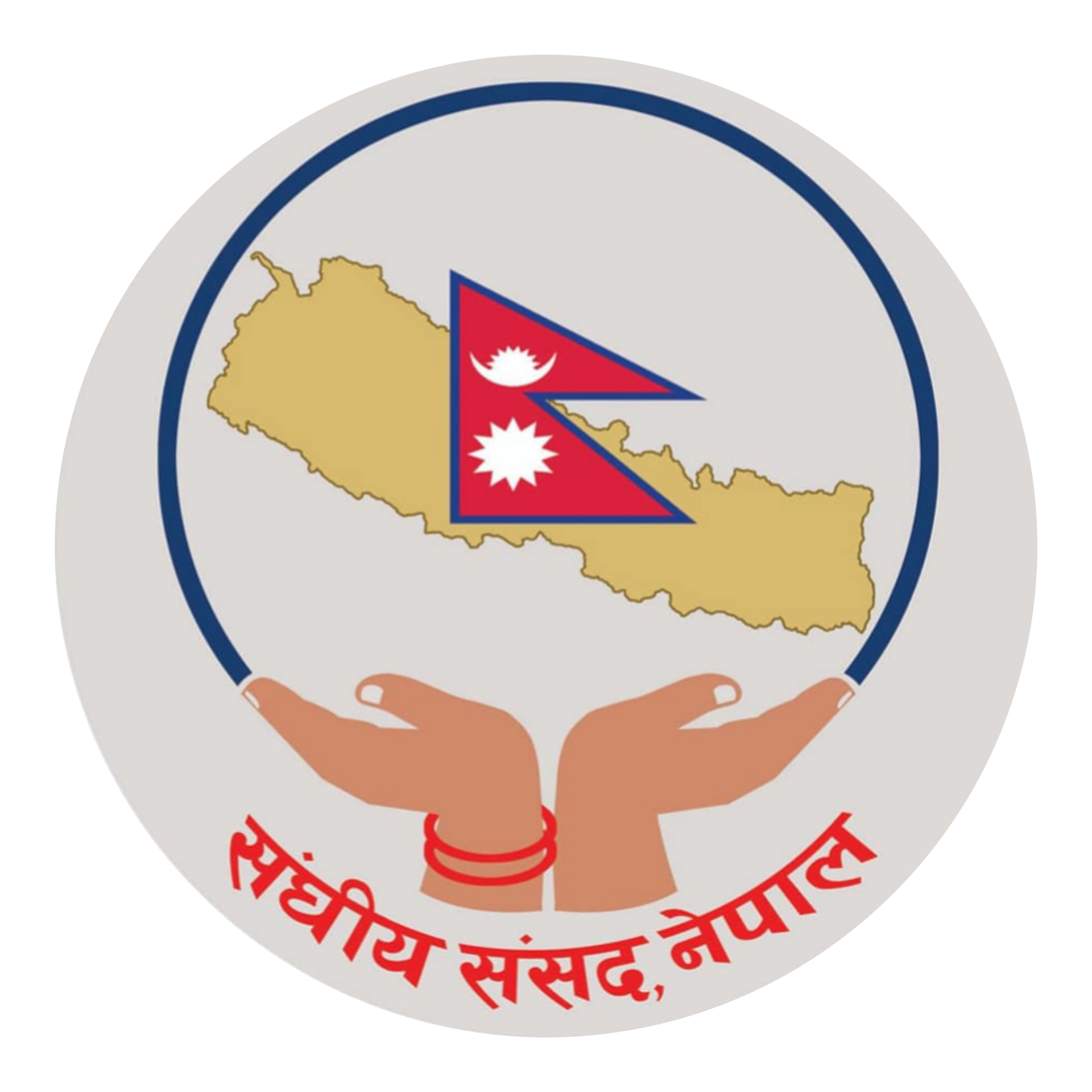
- Emblem of the Pratinidhi Sabha

- Flag of Nepal

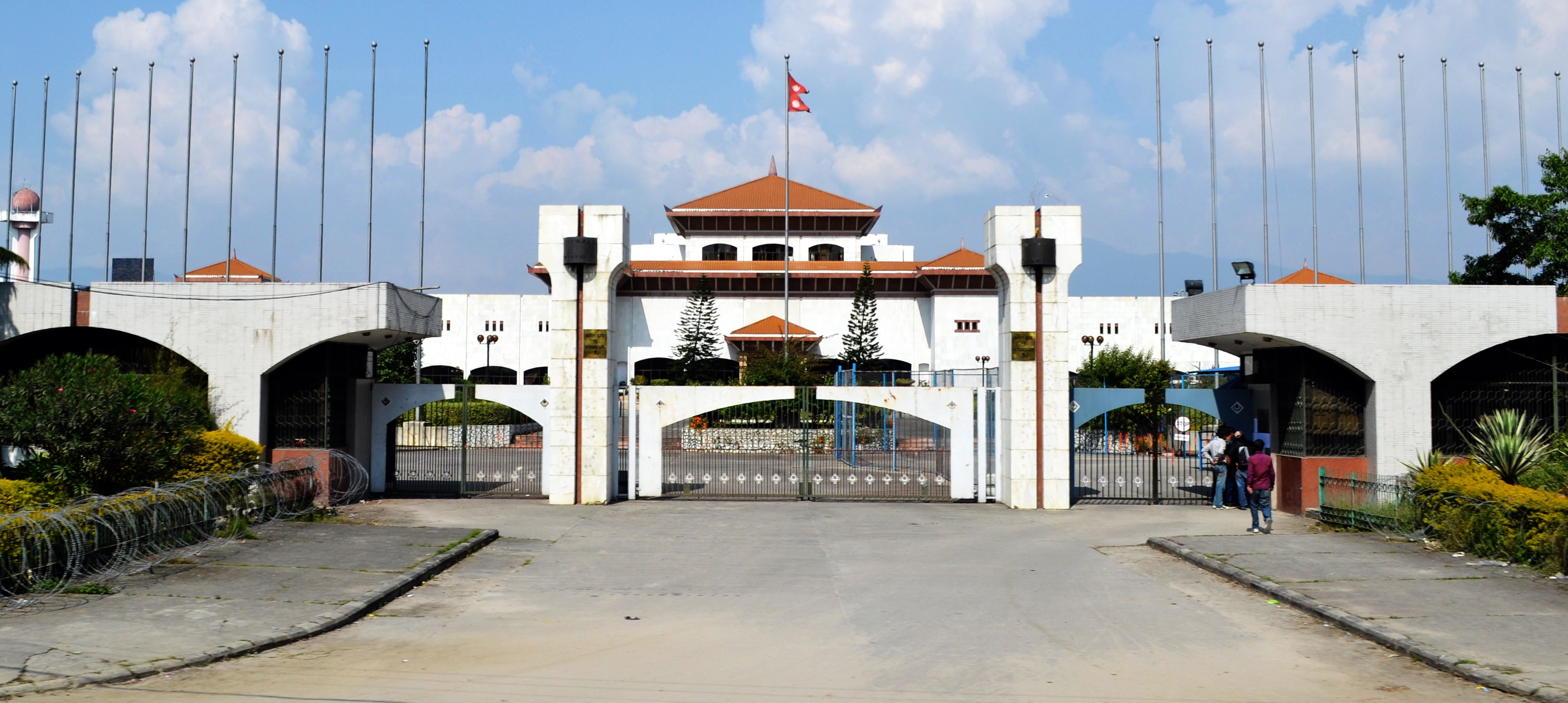
- Incumbent; 7th House of Representatives since 26 March 2026
- Sanghiya Samsad
- Style: The Honourable (Inside Nepal); His/Her Excellency (Outside Nepal)
- Type: Member of Parliament
- Abbreviation: MP
- Member of: Pratinidhi Sabha
- Reports to: Speaker
- Seat: Sanghiya Samsad Bhavan, Singha Durbar
- Appointer: Electorate of Nepal
- Term length: Five years; renewable
- Constituting instrument: Article 87 of Constitution of Nepal
- Formation: 30 June 1959 (67 years ago)
- First holder: 1st Pratinidi Sabha
- Salary: रू66,070 (US$430) per month (excl. allowances)
- Website: hr.parliament.gov.np

A Member of Parliament in the Pratinidhi Sabha is the representative of a legislative constituency in the Pratinidhi Sabha, the lower house of the Federal Parliament of Nepal. Members of the Pratinidhi Sabha are elected through single-member constituencies by first-past-the-post voting and proportional electoral system.The Constitution specifies that Parliament consists of 275 members. The leader of the largest party or alliance in Parliament usually becomes Prime Minister of Nepal.

All Members of Pratinidhi Sabha rank 10th in the Order of precedence in Nepal.

== Eligibility criteria ==
According to Article 87 of the Constitution of Nepal and the House of Representatives Election Act, 2017, to become a member of the Pratinidhi Sabha, the members must be:
(a) A citizen of Nepal
(b) A minimum of 25 years or older on the date of nomination
(c) Without a criminal offense conviction involving moral turpitude
(d) Not disqualified by any federal law
(e) Not hold any office of profit (paid by the government)
In addition, no member can be a member of both the Pratinidhi Sabha and the Rastriya Sabha.

== Disqualification grounds ==
According to Article 89 of the Constitution of Nepal, a person would be ineligible to be a Member of the Pratinidhi Sabha if the person:
(a) Written resignation to the Speaker
(b) Does not comply with Article 87 of the Constitution of Nepal
(c) Expired term of office/house
(d) Unclarified/uninformed absence for ten consecutive house sessions
(e) Resignation/removal from the party to which the candidate was associated during the election
(f) Death

== Term ==
The term of a member of the Pratinidhi Sabha is five years from the date of appointment for its first meeting. During a state of emergency, the term can be extended by the Parliament of Nepal by law for a period not exceeding one year at a time.

== Responsibilities ==
The broad responsibilities of the Pratinidhi Sabha members include:
(a) Legislative responsibility: To pass Law of Nepal in the Pratinidhi Sabha.
(b) Parliamentary Oversight responsibility: To hold the executive government to account and ensure it discharges its duties satisfactorily.
(d) Power of the purse responsibility: To approve and oversee the revenues and expenditures proposed by the government.

== Salary, privileges, and allowances ==
Members of the Pratinidhi Sabha are entitled to a monthly salary of रू66,070 (US$430) and other allowances. This is in accordance with the Act relating to remuneration and facilities of officers and members of the Federal Parliament, 2016, which makes provision for remuneration, allowances, and privileges for members.

== See also ==
- Member of Parliament, Rastriya Sabha
- 7th House of Representatives (Nepal)
- Federal Parliament of Nepal
