= Parliamentary committees of Nepal =

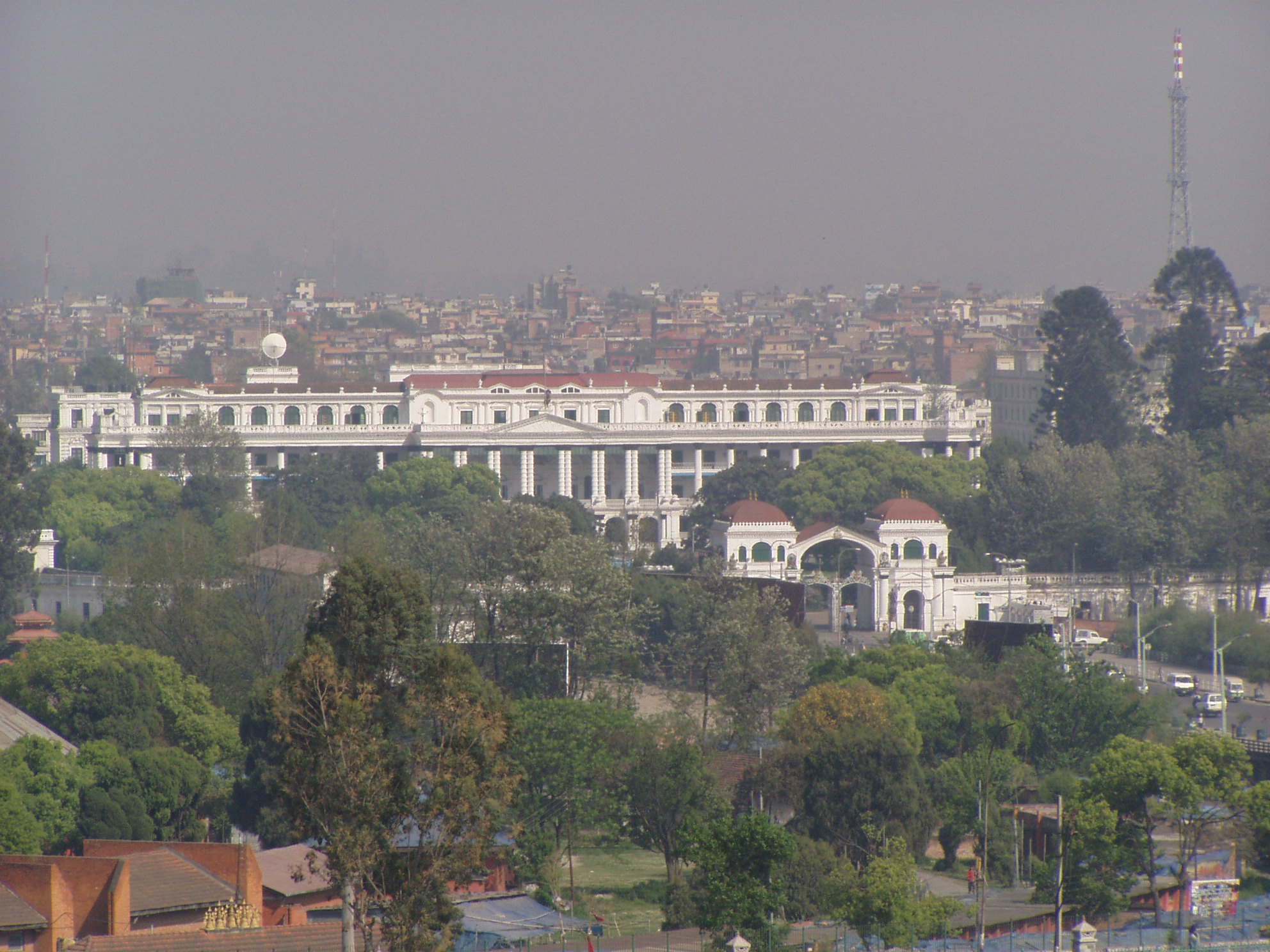
Committee meetings take place in committee rooms at the Singha Durbar, often in front of press and media or in private sessions.

The Parliamentary committees of Federal Parliament of Nepal are sub-legislative bodies each consisting of small number of Members of Parliament (MPs) from the House of Representatives, or MPs from the National Assembly, or a mix of both appointed to deal with particular areas or issues; most are made up of members of the Representatives appointed to deal with particular areas or issues.The majority of parliamentary committees are Select committees.

There are 16 thematic committees in the federal parliament: ten in the House of Representative, four in the National Assembly and two joint committees. Parliamentary committees are headed by the chairperson of the particular committee who are elected by the member of the same committee.

== House of Representatives ==
There are total of 10 committees in House of Representatives and 2 are joint committees including members of both the houses.

List of 10 committees of House of Representatives:

- Finance committee
- International Relations and Tourism committee
- Industry, Commerce, Labour and Consumer Welfare committee
- Law, Justice and Human Rights committee
- Agriculture, Cooperative and Natural Resources committee
- Women And Social Affairs committee
- State Affairs and Good Governance committee
- Infrastructure Development committee
- Education, Health and Information Technology committee
- Public Accounts committee

== National Assembly ==
There are 6 committees in National Assembly among which 2 are joint committees including the member of House of Representatives.

List of 4 committees of National Assembly:

- Development, Economic Affairs and Good Governance committee
- Legislation Management committee
- Public Policy and Delegated Legislation committee
- Federalism Enablement and National Concerns committee

== Joint Committees ==
There is 2 joint committees in which both the members of House of Representatives and National Assembly are included;

- Parliamentary Hearing
- Monitoring and Evaluation of the Implementation of the Directive Principles, Policies and Obligations of the state
