= Third Dahal cabinet =

Government of Nepal from 2022 to 2024

Dahal cabinet, 2022
- Cabinet of Nepal

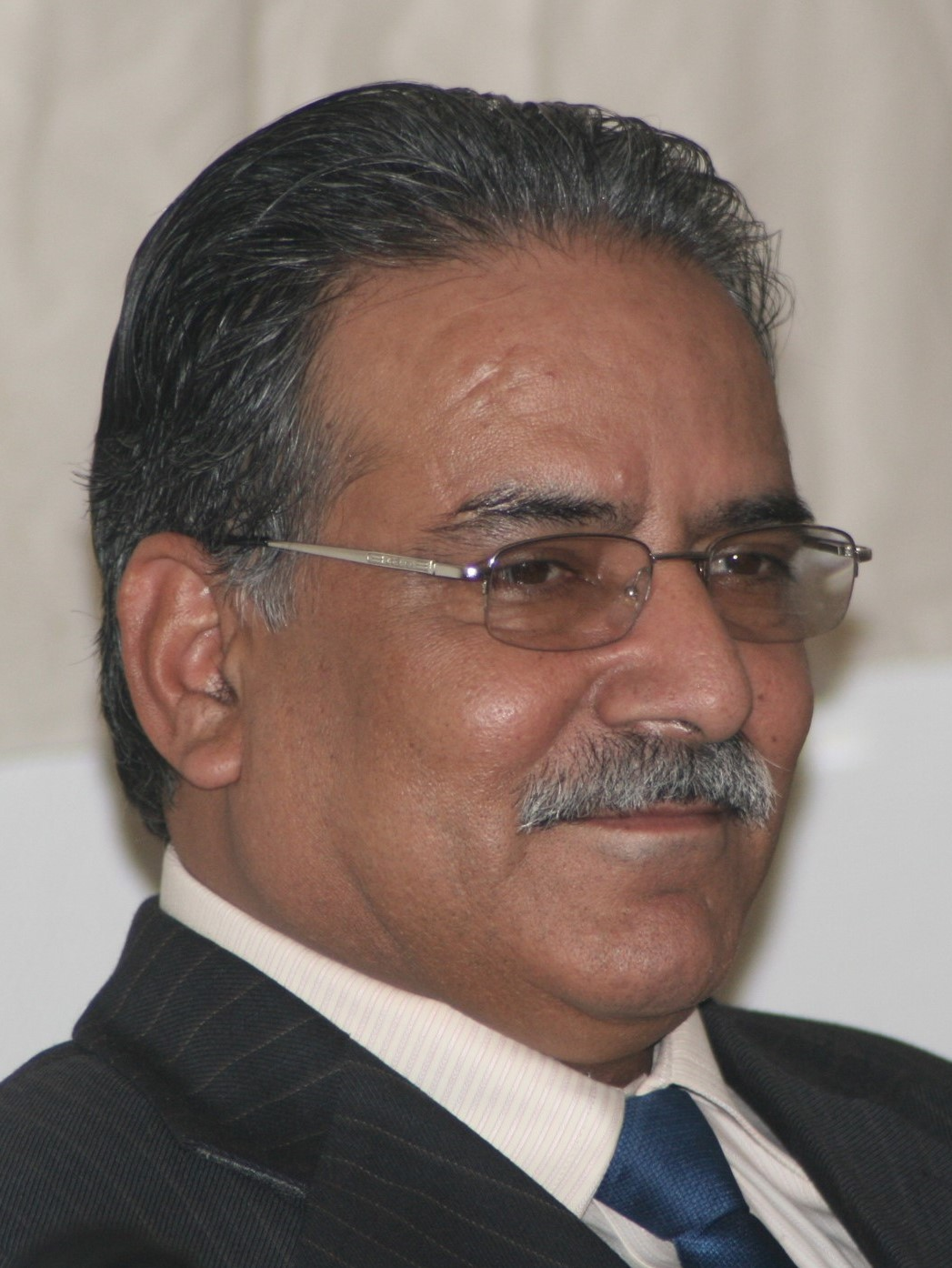
- Date formed: 26 December 2022
- Date dissolved: 15 July 2024

People and organisations
- President: Bidhya Devi Bhandari; Ram Chandra Paudel
- Prime Minister: Pushpa Kamal Dahal
- Deputy Prime Ministers: Narayan Kaji Shrestha; Rabi Lamichhane
- Ministers removed: 15
- Total no. of members: 25
- Member party: Maoist Centre (Note: The Nepal Socialist Party jointly registered with CPN (Maoist Centre) for the 2022 election, and all its MPs are part of the parliamentary party of CPN (Maoist Centre).) Coalition partners: RSP (Note: In government until 5 February 2023 and from 4 Match 2024. Support to government until 5 May 2023); Unified Socialist Former Members: Congress; CPN (UML) (Note: In government until 27 February 2023 and from 4 March 2024); RPP (Note: In government until 25 February 2023); PSP; Janamat (Note: External support between 31 March and 14 August 2023; opposition from 4 March 2024); PSP-Nepal; Loktantrik Samajwadi; Nagrik Unmukti
- Status in legislature: Majority Coalition Government (December 2022 — July 2024)
- Opposition party: Congress
- Opposition leader: Sher Bahadur Deuba

History
- Election: 2022 Nepalese general election
- Legislature term: 2nd Federal Parliament of Nepal
- Predecessor: Fifth Deuba cabinet
- Successor: Fourth Oli cabinet

The Dahal cabinet, 2022 or Third Dahal Cabinet was the former Government of Nepal, formed on 26 December 2022 after Pushpa Kamal Dahal was appointed as the new Prime Minister of Nepal by president Bidya Devi Bhandari, following the 2022 Nepalese general election.

== History ==
Dahal's claim for prime minister was supported by the Communist Party of Nepal (Unified Marxist–Leninist), Rastriya Swatantra Party, Rastriya Prajatantra Party, People's Socialist Party, Nepal, Janamat Party and Nagarik Unmukti Party, alongside his own Communist Party of Nepal (Maoist Centre). Prime Minister Dahal took his oath of office alongside three deputy prime ministers and four ministers on 26 December 2022.

On 10 January 2023, Dahal won a motion of confidence with 268 out of 270 votes in the 275-member House of Representatives, where he was supported by the ruling coalition as well as the opposition Nepali Congress, Communist Party of Nepal (Unified Socialist) and the Loktantrik Samajwadi Party, Nepal.

The cabinet was then expanded to include one more deputy prime minister, 11 ministers and three state ministers on 17 January 2023.

Deputy prime minister and minister for Home Affairs, Rabi Lamichhane, was stripped from his position in the cabinet on 27 January 2023 after the Supreme Court ruled that Lamichhane did not follow due process to re-obtain his Nepali citizenship after renouncing his American citizenship, and thus, he was not a legal Nepali citizen. Remaining ministers of the RSP resigned on 5 February after the party decided to call back its members from the cabinet while maintaining its support to the government.

On 25 February 2023, all ministers from the RPP resigned from the government, with the party also withdrawing its support, after a new coalition of eight parties including Nepali Congress, CPN (Maoist Centre), PSPN, CPN (US), Janamat Party, LSPN, NUP and Rastriya Janamorcha was formed with an agreement to support Nepali Congress' candidate in the upcoming presidential election. Shortly after, on 27 February, the CPN (UML) decided to quit government and withdraw its support as well, and its ministers resigned en-masse the same day.

On 20 March 2023, Dahal again secured a vote of confidence with 172 votes in his favor and 89 votes against out of the 262 members present in the 275-member lower house, where he was supported by the new eight-party ruling alliance as well as the RSP, with the CPN (UML) and RPP staying in opposition.

Following lengthened talks for the apportionment of ministries within the ruling alliance, Prime Minister Dahal expanded the cabinet on 31 March to include members from the new coalition. The power-sharing agreement between the ruling parties apportioned 8 ministries for Congress, 5 for CPN (Maoist Centre), 2-each for PSPN and CPN (US), and 1-each for Janamat, NUP, LSPN, NSP and an independent. Citing disagreement in portfolio division, Janamat Party exited the government a few hours before the cabinet expansion, while Nepali Congress put forward names for only four out of eight ministries allocated to them due to factional disagreements. The cabinet was expanded for an eighth time on 16 April 2023 to include an additional minister and a state minister. The cabinet was yet again expanded on 3 and 7 May 2023 to include further four ministers from the Nepali Congress. The cabinet was again expanded on 24 May 2023 to include an additional minister and state minister from the PSPN, thus bringing it to the maximum number prescribed in the constitution.

On 14 August 2023, Janamat Party rejoined the government when Aman Lal Modi of the CPN (Maoist Centre) was asked to resign as Minister for Federal Affairs and General Administration and Janamat's Anita Devi Sah was appointed to the portfolio.

== Final arrangement ==
=== With CPN (UML) as major Partner ===
S.N.	Portfolio	Minister	Political party	Assumed office	Left office	Ref.
Prime Minister
1.	Prime Minister of Nepal; All other ministries not allocated to anyone at any given moment.	Pushpa Kamal Dahal	Maoist Centre	26 December 2022	15 July 2024	
Deputy Prime Ministers
2.	Deputy Prime Minister; Minister for Physical Infrastructure and Transport	Raghubir Mahaseth	CPN (UML)	6 March 2024	3 July 2024	
3.	Deputy Prime Minister	Narayan Kaji Shrestha	Maoist Centre	26 December 2022	15 July 2024	
3.	Minister for Foreign Affairs (Note: Shrestha was appointed Deputy PM and Minister for Physical Infrastructure and Transport on 26 December 2022. His portfolio was changed during the cabinet rearrangement of 31 March 2023, and he served as Deputy PM and Minister for Home Affairs until 4 March 2023. On 6 March 2023, he was again given the portfolios of Deputy PM and the Minister for Foreign Affairs)	Narayan Kaji Shrestha	Maoist Centre	6 March 2024	15 July 2024	
4.	Deputy Prime Minister; Minister for Home Affairs	Rabi Lamichhane	RSP	6 March 2024	15 July 2024	
5.	Deputy Prime Minister; Minister for Health and Population	Upendra Yadav	PSP-Nepal	6 March 2024	13 May 2024	
Cabinet Ministers
(5.)	Minister for Health and Population	Pradeep Yadav	PSP	13 May 2024	8 July 2024	
6.	Minister for Finance	Barshaman Pun	Maoist Centre	6 March 2024	15 July 2024	
7.	Minister for Energy, Water Resources and Irrigation	Shakti Bahadur Basnet	Maoist Centre	6 March 2024	15 July 2024	
8.	Minister for Federal Affairs and General Administration	Bhanu Bhakta Joshi	Unified Socialist	6 March 2024	15 July 2024	
9.	Minister for Culture, Tourism and Civil Aviation	Hit Bahadur Tamang	Maoist Centre	4 March 2024	15 July 2024	
10.	Minister for Communication and Information Technology	Rekha Sharma	Maoist Centre	6 March 2024	15 July 2024	
11.	Minister for Law, Justice and Parliamentary Affairs	Padam Giri	CPN (UML)	4 March 2024	3 July 2024	
12.	Minister for Defence	Hari Prasad Upreti	CPN (UML)	6 March 2024	3 July 2024	
13.	Minister for Women, Children and Senior Citizen	Bhagwati Chaudhary	CPN (UML)	6 March 2024	3 July 2024	
14.	Minister for Water Supply	Rajendra Kumar Rai	CPN (UML)	6 March 2024	3 July 2024	
15.	Minister for Urban Development	Dhan Bahadur Budha	Unified Socialist	6 March 2024	15 July 2024	
16.	Minister for Forests and Environment	Nawal Kishor Sah (Note: Sah defected to newly formed PSP from PSP-N on May 5)	PSP-Nepal	10 March 2024	5 July 2024	
16.	Minister for Forests and Environment	Nawal Kishor Sah	PSP	10 March 2024	5 July 2024	
17.	Minister for Labour, Employment and Social Security	Dol Prasad Aryal	RSP	4 March 2024	15 July 2024	
18.	Minister for Education, Science and Technology	Sumana Shrestha	RSP	6 March 2024	15 July 2024	
20.	Minister for Land Management, Cooperatives and Poverty Alleviation	Balaram Adhikari	CPN (UML)	6 March 2024	3 July 2024	
21.	Minister for Youth and Sports	Biraj Bhakta Shrestha	RSP	6 March 2024	15 July 2024	
22.	Minister for Industry, Commerce and Supplies	Damodar Bhandari	CPN (UML)	6 March 2024	3 July 2024	
State Ministers
23.	Minister of State for Forests and Environment	Deepak Karki	PSP-Nepal	25 March 2024	13 May 2024	
24.	Minister of State for Health and Population	Hasina Khan	PSP	13 May 2024	8 July 2024	

=== With NC as major Partner ===
S.N.	Portfolio	Minister	Political party	Assumed office	Left office	Ref.
Prime Minister
1.	Prime Minister of Nepal; All other ministries not allocated to anyone at any given moment.	Pushpa Kamal Dahal	Maoist Centre	26 December 2022	15 July 2024	
Deputy Prime Ministers
2.	Deputy Prime Minister; Minister for Defence	Purna Bahadur Khadka	Congress	31 March 2023	4 March 2024	
3.	Deputy Prime Minister	Narayan Kaji Shrestha	Maoist Centre	26 December 2022	15 July 2024	
3.	Minister for Home Affairs (Note: Shrestha was appointed Deputy PM and Minister for Physical Infrastructure and Transport on 26 December 2022. His portfolio was changed during the cabinet rearrangement of 31 March 2023, and then he served as Deputy PM and Minister for Home Affairs.)	Narayan Kaji Shrestha	Maoist Centre	31 March 2023	6 March 2024	
Cabinet Ministers
4.	Minister for Agriculture and Livestock Development	Beduram Bhusal	Unified Socialist	31 March 2023	4 March 2024	
5.	Minister for Law, Justice and Parliamentary Affairs	Dhanraj Gurung	Congress	3 May 2023	4 March 2024	
6.	Minister for Education, Science and Technology	Ashok Rai	PSP-Nepal	31 March 2023	4 March 2024	
7.	Minister for Labour, Employment and Social Security	Sharat Singh Bhandari	Loktantrik Samajwadi	31 March 2023	4 March 2024	
8.	Minister for Finance	Prakash Sharan Mahat	Congress	31 March 2023	4 March 2024	
9.	Minister for Water Supply	Mahindra Ray Yadav	NSP	7 May 2023	4 March 2024	
10.	Minister for Women, Children and Senior Citizen	Mahindra Ray Yadav	NSP	31 March 2023	7 May 2023	
10.	Minister for Women, Children and Senior Citizen	Surendra Raj Acharya	Congress	7 May 2023	4 March 2024	
11.	Minister for Energy, Water Resources and Irrigation	Shakti Bahadur Basnet	Maoist Centre	31 March 2023	15 July 2024	
12.	Minister for Foreign Affairs	Narayan Prakash Saud	Congress	16 April 2023	4 March 2024	
13.	Minister for Communication and Information Technology	Rekha Sharma	Maoist Centre	17 January 2023	4 March 2024	
14.	Minister for Health and Population	Mohan Bahadur Basnet	Congress	3 May 2023	4 March 2024	
15.	Minister for Culture, Tourism and Civil Aviation	Sudan Kirati	Maoist Centre	17 January 2023	4 March 2024	
16.	Minister for Federal Affairs and General Administration	Aman Lal Modi	Maoist Centre	17 January 2023	14 August 2023	
16.	Minister for Federal Affairs and General Administration	Anita Devi Sah	Janamat	14 August 2023	4 March 2024	
17.	Minister for Physical Infrastructure and Transport	Prakash Jwala	Unified Socialist	31 March 2023	4 March 2024	
18.	Minister for Land Management, Cooperatives and Poverty Alleviation	Ranjeeta Shrestha	Nagrik Unmukti	31 March 2023	4 March 2024	
19.	Minister for Industry, Commerce and Supplies	Ramesh Rijal	Congress	31 March 2023	4 March 2024	
20.	Minister for Urban Development	Sita Gurung	Congress	31 March 2023	4 March 2024	
21.	Minister for Youth and Sports	Dig Bahadur Limbu	Congress	3 May 2023	4 March 2024	
22.	Minister for Forests and Environment	Birendra Prasad Mahato	PSP-Nepal	24 May 2023	4 March 2024	
State ministers
23.	Minister of State for Culture, Tourism and Civil Aviation	Sushila Sirpali Thakuri	Maoist Centre	17 January 2023	4 March 2024	
24.	Minister of State for Physical Infrastructure and Transport	Nanda Sharma	Unified Socialist	16 April 2023	4 March 2024	
25.	Minister of State for Education, Science and Technology	Pramila Kumari	PSP-Nepal	24 May 2023	4 March 2024	

=== With CPN (UML) as major Partner ===
S.N.	Portfolio	Minister	Political party	Assumed office	Left office	Ref.
Prime Minister
1.	Prime Minister of Nepal; All other ministries not allocated to anyone at any given moment.	Pushpa Kamal Dahal	Maoist Centre	26 December 2022	15 July 2024	
Deputy Prime Ministers
2.	Deputy Prime Minister; Minister for Finance	Bishnu Prasad Paudel	CPN (UML)	26 December 2022	27 February 2023	
3.	Deputy Prime Minister	Narayan Kaji Shrestha	Maoist Centre	26 December 2022	15 July 2024	
3.	Minister for Physical Infrastructure and Transport	Narayan Kaji Shrestha	Maoist Centre	26 December 2022	31 March 2023	
4.	Deputy Prime Minister; Minister for Home Affairs	Rabi Lamichhane	RSP	26 December 2022	27 January 2023	
5.	Deputy Prime Minister; Minister for Energy, Water Resources and Irrigation	Rajendra Prasad Lingden	RPP	17 January 2023	25 February 2023	
Cabinet Ministers
6.	Minister for Communication and Information Technology	Rekha Sharma	Maoist Centre	17 January 2023	4 March 2024	
7.	Minister for Urban Development	Bikram Pandey	RPP	17 January 2023	25 February 2023	
8.	Minister for Agriculture and Livestock Development	Jwala Kumari Sah	CPN (UML)	26 December 2022	27 February 2023	
9.	Minister for Industry, Commerce and Supplies	Damodar Bhandari	CPN (UML)	26 December 2022	27 February 2023	
10.	Minister for Land Management, Cooperatives and Poverty Alleviation	Rajendra Kumar Rai	CPN (UML)	26 December 2022	27 February 2023	
11.	Minister for Water Supply	Abdul Khan	Janamat	26 December 2022	31 March 2023	
12.	Minister for Foreign Affairs	Bimala Rai Paudyal	CPN (UML)	17 January 2023	27 February 2023	
13.	Minister for Health and Population	Padam Giri	CPN (UML)	17 January 2023	27 February 2023	
14.	Minister for Women, Children and Senior Citizen	Bhagwati Chaudhary	CPN (UML)	17 January 2023	27 February 2023	
15.	Minister for Defence	Hari Prasad Upreti	CPN (UML)	17 January 2023	27 February 2023	
16.	Minister for Culture, Tourism and Civil Aviation	Sudan Kirati	Maoist Centre	17 January 2023	4 March 2024	
17.	Minister for Federal Affairs and General Administration	Aman Lal Modi	Maoist Centre	17 January 2023	14 August 2023	
18.	Minister for Education, Science and Technology	Shishir Khanal	RSP	17 January 2023	5 March 2023	
19.	Minister for Labour, Employment and Social Security	Dol Prasad Aryal	RSP	17 January 2023	5 March 2023	
20.	Minister for Law, Justice and Parliamentary Affairs	Dhruba Bahadur Pradhan	RPP	17 January 2023	25 February 2023	
State Ministers
21.	Minister of State for Culture, Tourism and Civil Aviation	Sushila Sirpali Thakuri	Maoist Centre	17 January 2023	4 March 2024	
22.	Minister of State for Health and Population	Toshima Karki	RSP	17 January 2023	5 March 2023	
23.	Minister of State for Energy, Water Resources and Irrigation	Deepak Bahadur Singh	RPP	17 January 2023	25 February 2023	
