= Rastriya Swatantra Party =

Centrist political party in Nepal

Rastriya Swatantra Party राष्ट्रिय स्वतन्त्र पार्टी
- Abbreviation: RSP
- Leader: Balen Shah
- President: Rabi Lamichhane
- General Secretary: Bipin Kumar Acharya
- Spokesperson: Jagdish Kharel
- Vice-President: Swarnim Wagle; Sobita Gautam
- Joint General Secretary: Hari Dhakal; Asim Shah; Nisha Dangi
- Chief Whip: Kabindra Burlakoti
- Party Treasurer: Manohar Pradhan
- Founder: Rabi Lamichhane
- Founded: 1 July 2022; 4 years ago
- Merger of: Bibeksheel Sajha Party
- Headquarters: Chamati, Banasthali 16, Kathmandu
- Membership (July 2026): 390,112 (Note: The party reported that, as of 1 July 2026, 390,112 members had been verified using official documents out of 523,465 membership applications registered in its digital system. RSP stated that the remaining applications were still under verification and that the preliminary application total should not be presented as the final membership record.); Increased from 241,799 (2025); +148,313 (▲61.34%)
- Ideology: Liberalism; Progressivism
- Political position: Centre
- Colours: Sky blue
- Slogan: अब जान्नेलाई छान्ने ('Select the knowledgeable')
- ECN Status: National Party (1st largest)
- Lawyers' Wing: Swatantra Kanun Byawasayee Manch
- Seats in Pratinidhi Sabha: 182 / 275
- Seats in Rastriya Sabha: 0 / 59
- Mayors/Chairs: 1 / 753
- Seats in Provincial Assemblies: 0 / 550
- Councillors: 12 / 35,011

Election symbol

Party flag
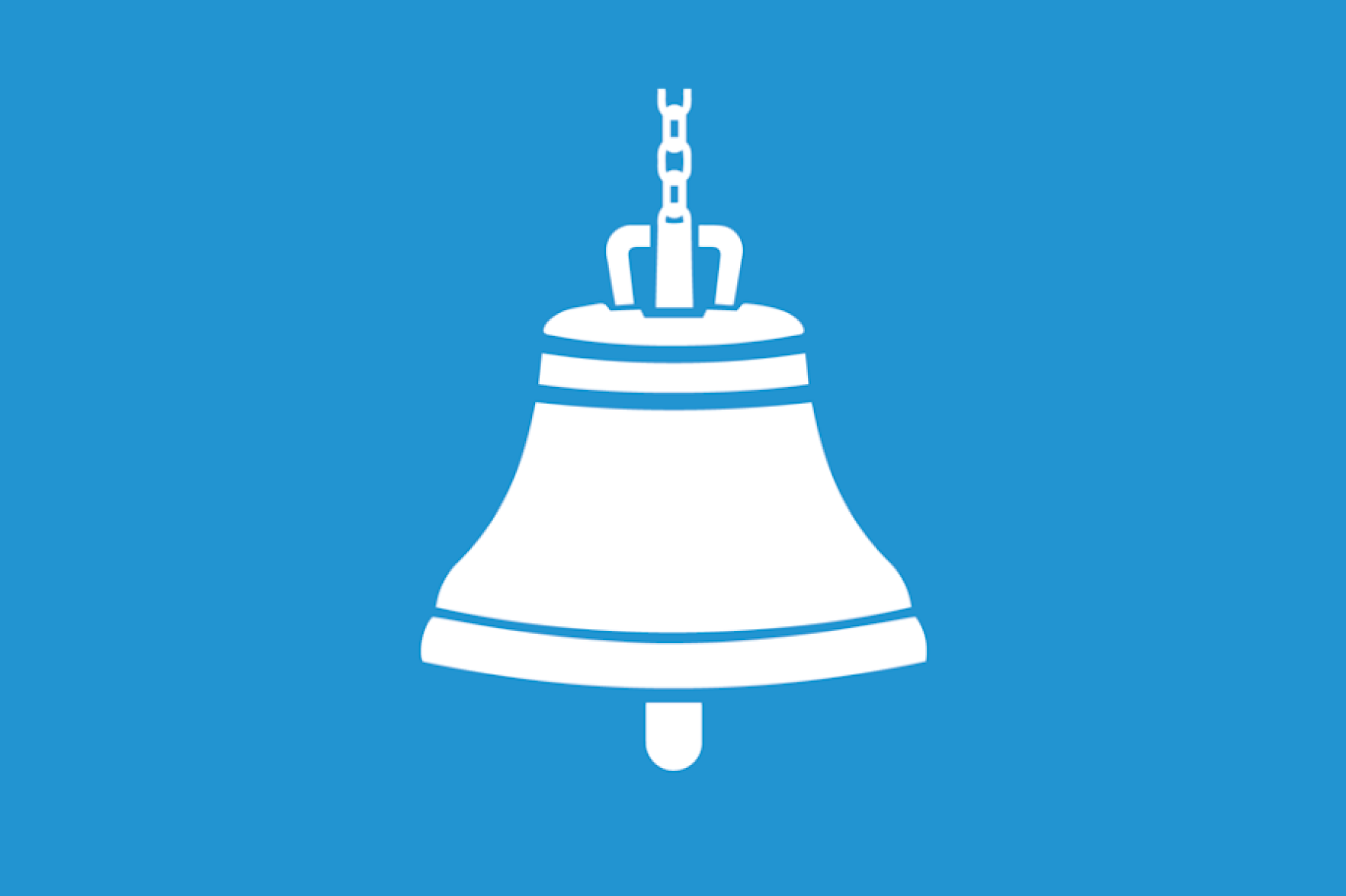

Website
- rspnepal.org
- Politics of Nepal; Political parties; Elections; A: Also described as centre-left and centre-right.

The Rastriya Swatantra Party (RSP) (Note: Nepali: राष्ट्रिय स्वतन्त्र पार्टी, lit. 'National Independent Party') is a centrist political party in Nepal. It has been the governing party of Nepal since the 2026 general election with 182 seats out of 275 in the House of Representatives.

The RSP was founded by broadcaster Rabi Lamichhane in 2022 in order to contest the 2022 general election. The party won 10.70% of the party list vote and became one of seven national parties in the Federal Parliament. It joined the coalition government of Pushpa Kamal Dahal with Lamichhane as deputy prime minister. The party withdrew from the cabinet after Lamichhane's citizenship was declared invalid by the Supreme Court of Nepal in 2023. The party again became a coalition partner in the Prachanda-led government with four cabinet ministries from March to July 2024. Lamichhane was arrested in late 2024 following accusations of cooperative fraud and Dol Prasad Aryal served as acting president. In the aftermath of the 2025 Gen Z protests, fan favourite Balen Shah joined the RSP, whose political agenda reshaped the party's identity. The RSP won a near two-thirds majority in the 2026 election with Shah as prime minister.

Classified as a progressive liberal party with populist appeal, the RSP has campaigned on constitutional socialism, secularism and a welfare state. It also supports the Right to Recall provisions for its elected MPs, pledging anti-corruption stands and calling for a shift towards liberal economy in Nepal.

== History ==
=== Foundation and early years (2022–2025) ===
On 16 June 2022, Rabi Lamichhane resigned as managing director of now defunct Galaxy 4K TV and announced that he would be contesting in the 2022 general elections for a seat at the House of Representatives. On 21 June 2022, he announced the formation of Rastriya Swatantra Party along with a 21-member central committee. The party was formally registered in the Election Commission on 1 July 2022 with Rabi Lamichhane as the founding president and a bell inside a circle as its election symbol.

The party fielded candidates in 131 constituencies for the 2022 general election, but did not contest the provincial elections. The party won seven direct seats and 13 proportional seats to the House of Representatives. It received 10.70% of the party list vote and became one of seven national parties in the Federal Parliament. The RSP was the fourth-largest national party in Nepal after the 2022 general election. Following the election, the party joined the coalition government of Pushpa Kamal Dahal with party president Rabi Lamichhane serving as deputy prime minister. Indira Rana Magar from the party was elected as the deputy speaker of the House of Representatives. The party was a coalition partner in the Prachanda-led government with four cabinet ministries from 6 March 2024 to 12 July 2024. Previously, it was a junior ally in the Prachanda-led government from 26 December 2022 until 5 February 2023.

The party withdrew from the cabinet after Lamichhane's citizenship was declared invalid by the Supreme Court, but continued to support the government. Following the decision, Dol Prasad Aryal became acting president of the party. The party replaced list MP Dhaka Kumar Shrestha and expelled him from the party following corruption accusations.

The party contested the by-elections in 2023 and gained a seat in Tanahun 1 while Lamichhane was re-elected from Chitwan 2. The party rejoined the coalition government of Dahal in March 2024, but the cabinet was dissolved after a breakdown in the alliance a month later. The party expelled general secretary Mukul Dhakal from the party for violating party rules.

Party president Lamichhane was arrested in October 2024 following accusations of cooperative fraud and Dol Prasad Aryal served as acting president. In June 2025, Kabindra Burlakoti was appointed as general secretary and Manish Jha was appointed as party spokesperson.

=== Gen Z protests (2025–present) ===
Following the Gen Z protests, former MP Sumana Shrestha resigned from the party. Chief whip Santosh Pariyar also left the party and joined the Pragatisheel Loktantrik Party. In December 2025, Bibeksheel Sajha Party merged into the party. The party also signed an agreement to merge with Ujyaalo Nepal Party and to bring Kathmandu Mayor Balen Shah into the party. The agreement with Ujyaalo Nepal Party later collapsed and the merger did not go ahead. The party won a near-supermajority of 182 out of 275 seats in the 2026 national elections, and its candidate Balen Shah became prime minister on 27 March 2026.

== Organization ==
The party had announced that it would have no sister organizations and only have members, not cadres. It had also announced that primary elections would be held to select candidates for elections from the party. The party selected candidates for the 2022 general election through a primary election. The party holds its General Convention every 4–5 years.

== Ideology ==
The party supports constitutional socialism, progressivism, secularism, pragmatism, participatory democracy, social democracy, a liberal economy with a welfare state, economic liberalism, and political freedom. The party has been described as centrist by scholars and different members within the party. In 2026, Deutsche Welle referred to the party as "centrist-liberal." The RSP has also been regarded as a populist party.

As a progressive liberal party, the party strongly follows Right to Recall provisions for its elected MPs, anti-corruption stands pledging to probe assets of public officeholders since 1990 alongside social justice to marginalized communities, meritocracy in civil services, unified health service transparency, envisioned road transport model, amendment of land acquisition and environmental clearance laws, single-window service delivery system to fast-track projects, 'National Knowledge Bank' to connect foreign experts with domestic sectors in commercial industries, digital-first governance and a strict oversight on BFIs protecting small depositors and pension funds under its political spectrum.

== Ministry responsible ==
=== Under Balen Shah Cabinet ===
Balen Shah Cabinet
S.N.	Minister	Role	Assumed office	Left office	Tenure
1.	Balendra Shah	Prime Minister	27 March 2026	Incumbent	238 days
2.	Dr. Swarnim Wagle	Ministry of Finance	27 March 2026	Incumbent	238 days
3.	Shisir Khanal	Ministry of Foreign Affairs	27 March 2026	Incumbent	238 days
4.	Sunil Lamsal	Ministry of Infrastructure Development	27 March 2026	Incumbent	238 days
5.	Sobita Gautam	Ministry of Law, Justice and Parliamentary Affairs	27 March 2026	Incumbent	238 days
6.	Dr. Bikram Timalsina	Ministry of Information and Communication	27 March 2026	Incumbent	238 days
7.	Sasmit Pokharel	Ministry of Education and Sports	27 March 2026	Incumbent	238 days
8.	Khadak Raj Paudel	Ministry of Culture, Tourism and Civil Aviation	27 March 2026	Incumbent	238 days
9.	Nisha Mehta	Ministry of Health and Food Safety	27 March 2026	Incumbent	238 days
10.	Biraj Bhakta Shrestha	Ministry of Energy, Water Resources and Irrigation	27 March 2026	Incumbent	238 days
11.	Pratibha Rawal	Ministry of Land Management, Cooperatives, Federal Affairs and General Administration	27 March 2026	Incumbent	238 days
12.	Geeta Chaudhary	Ministry of Agriculture, Forests and Environment	27 March 2026	Incumbent	238 days
13.	Sita Badi	Ministry of Women, Children, Gender and Sexual Minorities and Social Security	27 March 2026	Incumbent	238 days
15.	Ramjee Yadav	Ministry of Youth, Labour and Employment	10 April 2026	Incumbent	224 days
16.	Sudan Gurung (Re-appointed)	Ministry of Home Affairs	9 June 2026	Incumbent	164 days
17.	Vacant (Allocated to prime minister)	Ministry of Defence	27 March 2026	Incumbent	238 days
18.	Deepak Kumar Sah	Ministry of Industry, Commerce and Supplies	10 September 2026	Incumbent	71 days
–	Sudan Gurung (Resigned)	Ministry of Home Affairs	27 March 2026	22 April 2026	26 days
–	Dipak Kumar Sah (Removed)	Ministry of Labour, Employment and Social Security	27 March 2026	9 April 2026	13 days
–	Gauri Kumari Yadav (Resigned)	Ministry of Industry, Commerce and Supplies	10 April 2026	10 September 2026	153 days

=== Under Dahal Cabinet ===
==== From 6 March to 12 July 2024 ====
Dahal III
S.N.	Minister	Role	Assumed office	Left office	Tenure
1.	Rabi Lamichhane	Ministry of Home Affairs, Deputy Prime Minister of Nepal	6 March 2024	12 July 2024	128 days
2.	Sumana Shrestha	Ministry of Education, Science and Technology	6 March 2024	12 July 2024	128 days
3.	Dol Prasad Aryal	Ministry of Labour, Employment and Social Security	6 March 2024	12 July 2024	128 days
4.	Biraj Bhakta Shrestha	Ministry of Youth and Sports	6 March 2024	12 July 2024	128 days

==== From 17 January to 5 February 2023 ====
Dahal III
S.N.	Minister	Role	Assumed office	Left office	Tenure	Successor
1.	Dol Prasad Aryal	Ministry of Labour, Employment and Social Security	17 January 2023	5 February 2023	19 days	Sharat Singh Bhandari
2.	Shishir Khanal	Ministry of Education, Science and Technology	17 January 2023	5 February 2023	19 days	Ashok Rai
3.	Toshima Karki	State Ministry of Health and Population	17 January 2023	5 February 2023	19 days	Pushpa Kamal Dahal not allocated to anyone

== Policy platform ==
=== Natural order of the economy ===
The party endorses an economy with individual rights, where industrial and commercial activities are off-limits to the government, which cannot interfere with economic relations between individuals, groups, classes, or entire nations. The party supports the idea that economic freedom will drive the economy to prosperity and that planning and interference by the government disrupt the economy and have adverse effects.

=== Electoral reform ===
It also supports the introduction of recall elections, the right to reject and a provision for absentee ballots. The party also supports directly electing the prime minister and directly electing chief ministers for the seven provinces of Nepal.

The party in its manifesto for the 2022 elections also supported the idea of a non-partisan president elected by an expanded electoral college which would incorporate elected representatives from ward chairs to federal lawmakers and also touted the idea of the chairman of the National Assembly acting as the de facto vice-president. The party also seeks to end political appointments in constitutional bodies and has called for the Constitutional Council to be scrapped, and for appointments to constitutional bodies be recommended by the National Assembly and confirmed by the House of Representatives instead. The party has also called for the dissolution of provincial assemblies, district co-ordination committees and has stood in favour of a provincial council which would be elected by the heads of local governments in the province. The party chair Rabi Lamichhane did not cast his vote at the 2022 provincial elections.

=== Economic and social welfare ===
The party sees the private sector, co-operatives and the public sector as the three pillars of the economy. The party favors competition and seeks to establish a growing role of the private sector as an alternative to the public sector in order to deliver services to the people and for economic growth. The party wants to end income tax for people in the lowest octile of earners in the country. The party also seeks to establish food banks in every ward in the country and to guarantee nutrition assistance for people living under the poverty line by issuing them ration cards. The party also seeks to expand the current social welfare system and to include private insurance companies in the social welfare system.

=== Healthcare ===
The party supports the establishment of a single-payer healthcare system and the establishment of at least one laboratory and a 750-bed hospital in each of the seven provinces, a 50 to 100-bed hospital in each of the 77 districts, a 6 to 25-bed hospital in each local unit and a clinic in each ward in the country. The party also wants to establish a centralized national ambulance service, health and quality assurance accreditation board, a food and drug department, a central disease board and a health innovation & development board. The party also wants to create a health workers act for public healthcare workers.

=== Corruption ===
The party seeks to crackdown on corruption by introducing a Whistleblower Protection Act to protect whistleblowers and by establishing an Anti-Corruption Police under the Commission for the Investigation of Abuse of Authority.

=== Women and sexual minorities ===
The party has also called for the establishment of shelters for victims of abuse and the creation of a fund to help victims of human trafficking, domestic violence and acid attack victims. The party also seeks to promote entrepreneurship among women and sexual minorities by establishing funds for businesses where at least sixty percent of the shareholders or employees are female or of a sexual minority group.

== Election results ==
The party nominated 131 candidates for the First Past the Post seats for the 2022 Nepalese general election. The party nominated 164 candidates for the First Past the Post seats for the 2026 Nepalese general election.

Election	Leader	Constituency votes			Party list votes			Seats	±	Position	Resulting government
Election	Leader	No.	%	±	No.	%	±	Seats	±	Position	Resulting government
2022	Rabi Lamichhane	815,023	7.77		1,130,344	10.70		21 / 275		4th	In coalition
2022	Rabi Lamichhane	815,023	7.77		1,130,344	10.70		21 / 275		4th	Opposition
2026	Rabi Lamichhane	4,650,697	44.17	▲36.4	5,183,493	47.84	▲37.14	182 / 275	▲161	▲1st	Government

== Leadership ==
=== Current office bearers ===
(As of June 2026)
SN	Position	Office bearer	Portrait	Term since	Ref.
1	President	Rabi Lamichhane		1 July 2022	
2	Vice President	Swarnim Wagle		29 November 2023	
2	Vice President	Sobita Gautam		26 June 2026	
2	Vice President	TBC			
3	General Secretary	Bipin Kumar Acharya		26 June 2026	
3	General Secretary	TBC			
4	Joint General Secretary	Asim Shah		26 June 2026	
4	Joint General Secretary	Hari Dhakal		26 June 2026	
4	Joint General Secretary	Nisha Dangi		26 June 2026	
4	Joint General Secretary	TBC			
4	Joint General Secretary	TBC			
5	Spokesperson	Jagdish Kharel		21 August 2026	
6	Joint Spokesperson	TBC			
6	Joint Spokesperson	TBC			
6	Joint Spokesperson	TBC			
7	Treasurer	Manohar Pradhan		21 August 2026	
8	Joint Treasurer	TBC			
8	Joint Treasurer	TBC			

=== Former office bearers ===
Position	Office bearer	Term	Ref.	Remarks
Vice President	Dol Prasad Aryal	Jul 2022 – Mar 2026		Elected Speaker
General Secretary	Mukul Dhakal	Jul 2022 – Jul 2024		Suspended & subsequently removed
General Secretary	Kabindra Burlakoti	Jun 2025 – Jun 2026		Term ended
Joint General Secretary	Bipin Kumar Acharya	Nov 2023 – Jun 2026		Term ended
Joint General Secretary	Sumana Shrestha	Nov 2023 – Apr 2025		Resigned
Spokesperson	Manish Jha	Jun 2025 – Jun 2026		Term ended

== Members of Parliament ==
=== Pratinidhi Shabha (2026–present) ===
These MPs list of order is based on party power holdings, ministerial rank, and tenure in the House of Representatives.

No.	MPs	Portrait	Constituency	Assumed office	End Office	Tenure	Preceded by
1.	Rabi Lamichhane		Chitwan 2	27 March 2026		238 days	Krishna Bhakta Pokhrel
2.	Balendra Shah		Jhapa 5	27 March 2026		238 days	K.P. Sharma Oli
3.	Swarnim Wagle		Tanahun 1	27 March 2026		238 days	Ram Chandra Paudel
4.	Dol Prasad Aryal		Kathmandu 9	27 March 2026		238 days	Krishna Gopal Shrestha
5.	Kabindra Burlakoti		Gorkha 2	27 March 2026		238 days	Pushpa Kamal Dahal
6.	Manish Jha		Dhanusha 3	27 March 2026		238 days	Julie Kumari Mahato
7.	Shishir Khanal		Kathmandu 6	27 March 2026		238 days	Bhimsen Das Pradhan
8.	Biraj Bhakta Shrestha		Kathmandu 8	27 March 2026		238 days	Jeevan Ram Shrestha
9.	Hari Dhakal		Chitwan 1	27 March 2026		238 days	Surendra Pandey
10.	Bipin Kumar Acharya		Dang 2	27 March 2026		238 days	Rekha Sharma
11.	Nisha Dangi		Jhapa 1	27 March 2026		238 days	Bishwa Prakash Sharma
12.	Sobita Gautam		Chitwan 3	27 March 2026		238 days	Bikram Pandey
13.	Toshima Karki		Lalitpur 3	27 March 2026		238 days	Pampha Bhusal
14.	Indira Ranamagar		Jhapa 2	27 March 2026		238 days	Dev Raj Ghimire
15.	Ganesh Parajuli		Kathmandu 7	27 March 2026		238 days	Ram Bir Manandhar
16.	Amresh Kumar Singh		Sarlahi 4	27 March 2026		238 days	–
17.	Sasmit Pokharel		Kathmandu 5	27 March 2026		238 days	Pradip Paudel
18.	Mohan Lal Acharya		Kapilvastu 1	27 March 2026		238 days	Balram Adhikari
19.	Krishna Hari Budhathoki		Ramechhap 1	27 March 2026		238 days	Purna Bahadur Tamang
20.	Paras Mani Gelal		Udayapur 1	27 March 2026		238 days	Narayan Khadka
21.	Yagyamani Neupane		Morang 1	27 March 2026		238 days	Dig Bahadur Limbu
22.	Deepak Raj Bohara		Kanchanpur 2	27 March 2026		238 days	Narayan Prakash Saud
23.	Bharat Prasad Parajuli		Sindhupalchok 1	27 March 2026		238 days	Madhav Sapkota
24.	Badan Kumar Bhandari		Kavrepalanchok 2	27 March 2026		238 days	Gokul Prasad Baskota
25.	Sagar Dhakal		Gulmi 1	27 March 2026		238 days	Chandra Bhandari
26.	Lekhjung Thapa		Rupandehi 3	27 March 2026		238 days	Deepak Bohara
27.	Bina Gurung		Kaski 3	27 March 2026		238 days	Damodar Prasad Bairagi
28.	Shreeram Neupane		Tanahun 2	27 March 2026		238 days	Shankar Bhandari
29.	Sushant Vaidik		Pyuthan 1	27 March 2026		238 days	Surya Bahadur Thapa Chhetri
30.	Sushil Khadka		Baglung 1	27 March 2026		238 days	Chitra Bahadur K.C.
31.	Kamal Subedi		Dang 3	27 March 2026		238 days	Deepak Giri
32.	Aashish Gajurel		Sindhuli 2	27 March 2026		238 days	Lekhnath Dahal
33.	Bablu Gupta		Siraha 1	27 March 2026		238 days	Ram Shankar Yadav
34.	Sunil Lamsal		Rupandehi 1	27 March 2026		238 days	Chhabilal Bishwakarma
35.	Bodh Narayan Shrestha		Dhading 2	27 March 2026		238 days	Ram Nath Adhikari
36.	Bikram Timilsina		Nuwakot 1	27 March 2026		238 days	Hit Bahadur Tamang
37.	Sulabh Kharel		Rupandehi 2	27 March 2026		238 days	Bishnu Prasad Paudel
38.	Rajiv Khatri		Bhaktapur 2	27 March 2026		238 days	Durlabh Thapa Chhetri
39.	Pradip Bista		Kathmandu 10	27 March 2026		238 days	Rajendra Kumar KC
40.	Bishwaraj Pokharel		Okhaldhunga 1	27 March 2026		238 days	Ram Hari Khatiwada
41.	Jagdish Kharel		Lalitpur 2	27 March 2026		238 days	Prem Bahadur Maharjan
42.	Sudan Gurung		Gorkha 1	27 March 2026		238 days	Rajendra Bajgain
43.	Ranju Darshana		Kathmandu 1	27 March 2026		238 days	Prakash Man Singh
44.	Pukar Bam		Kathmandu 4	27 March 2026		238 days	Gagan Thapa
45.	Prashant Upreti		Makwanpur 2	27 March 2026		238 days	Mahesh Kumar Bartaula
46.	Madhu Kumar Chaulagain		Kavrepalanchok 1	27 March 2026		238 days	Surya Man Dong Tamang
47.	Ganesh Karki		Morang 3	27 March 2026		238 days	Sunil Sharma
48.	Tara Prasad Joshi		Dadeldhura 1	27 March 2026		238 days	Sher Bahadur Deuba
49.	Rajunath Pandey		Kathmandu 3	27 March 2026		238 days	Santosh Chalise
50.	Dhananjaya Regmi		Syangja 1	27 March 2026		238 days	Raju Thapa
51.	Shiv Shankar Yadav		Siraha 2	27 March 2026		238 days	Raj Kishor Yadav
52.	Ashok Kumar Chaudhary		Sunsari 3	27 March 2026		238 days	Bhagwati Chaudhary
53.	Prakash Pathak		Jhapa 3	27 March 2026		238 days	Rajendra Prasad Lingden
54.	Arvind Sah		Bara 3	27 March 2026		238 days	Jwala Kumari Sah
55.	Shambhu Prasad Dhakal		Jhapa 4	27 March 2026		238 days	Lal Prasad Sawa Limbu
56.	Nitima Bhandari		Sarlahi 1	27 March 2026		238 days	Ram Prakash Chaudhary
57.	Hari Prasad Bhusal		Arghakhanchi 1	27 March 2026		238 days	Top Bahadur Rayamajhi
58.	Sunil K.C.		Kathmandu 2	27 March 2026		238 days	Sobita Gautam
59.	Khadak Raj Paudel		Kaski 1	27 March 2026		238 days	Man Bahadur Gurung
60.	Gauri Kumari Yadav		Mahottari 4	27 March 2026		238 days	Mahendra Kumar Raya
61.	Rajan Gautam		Nawalpur 1	27 March 2026		238 days	Shashanka Koirala
62.	Janak Singh Dhami		Kanchanpur 1	27 March 2026		238 days	Tara Lama Tamang
63.	Rubina Acharya		Morang 6	27 March 2026		238 days	Shekhar Koirala
64.	Bikram Khanal		Nawalparasi 1	27 March 2026		238 days	Binod Chaudhary
65.	Rahbar Ansari		Bara 4	27 March 2026		238 days	Krishna Kumar Shrestha
66.	Som Sharma		Baglung 2	27 March 2026		238 days	Devendra Paudel
67.	Rukesh Ranjit		Bhaktapur 1	27 March 2026		238 days	Prem Suwal
68.	Govinda Panthi		Gulmi 2	27 March 2026		238 days	Gokarna Bista
69.	Gyanendra Singh Mahata		Kanchanpur 3	27 March 2026		238 days	Ramesh Lekhak
70.	Asha Jha		Morang 5	27 March 2026		238 days	Yogendra Mandal
71.	Ramesh Kumar Sapkota		Surkhet 2	27 March 2026		238 days	Hridaya Ram Thani
72.	Tek Bahadur Shakya		Parsa 4	27 March 2026		238 days	Ramesh Rijal
73.	Uttam Prasad Paudel		Kaski 2	27 March 2026		238 days	Bidya Bhattarai
74.	Hari Mohan Bhandari		Baitadi 1	27 March 2026		238 days	Damodar Bhandari
75.	K.P. Khanal		Kailali 2	27 March 2026		238 days	Arun Kumar Chaudhary
76.	Ananda Bahadur Chand		Kailali 5	27 March 2026		238 days	Dilli Raj Pant
77.	Dharmaraj K.C.		Lamjung 1	27 March 2026		238 days	Prithvi Subba Gurung
78.	Sagar Bhusal		Parbat 1	27 March 2026		238 days	Padam Giri
79.	Manish Khanal		Nawalpur 2	27 March 2026		238 days	Bishnu Kumar Karki
80.	Dhanendra Karki		Sindhuli 1	27 March 2026		238 days	Shyam Kumar Ghimire
81.	Ashika Tamang		Dhading 1	27 March 2026		238 days	Rajendra Prasad Pandey
82.	Ramjee Yadav		Saptari 2	27 March 2026		238 days	CK Raut
83.	Buddha Ratna Maharjan		Lalitpur 1	27 March 2026		238 days	Udaya Shumsher Rana
84.	Komal Gyawali		Kailali 1	27 March 2026		238 days	Ranjeeta Shrestha
85.	Lal Bikram Thapa		Sunsari 2	27 March 2026		238 days	Bhim Acharya
86.	Ganesh Dhimal		Bara 1	27 March 2026		238 days	Achyut Prasad Mainali
87.	Ujjwal Kumar Jha		Mahottari 3	27 March 2026		238 days	Mahantha Thakur
88.	Madhav Bahadur Thapa		Palpa 2	27 March 2026		238 days	Thakur Prasad Gaire
89.	Jagat Prasad Joshi		Kailali 3	27 March 2026		238 days	Ganga Ram Chaudhary
90.	Raj Kishor Mahato		Dhanusha 4	27 March 2026		238 days	Raghubir Mahaseth
91.	Buddhi Prasad Pant		Parsa 1	27 March 2026		238 days	Pradeep Yadav
92.	Thakur Singh Tharu		Bardiya 1	27 March 2026		238 days	Sanjay Kumar Gautam
93.	Pramod Kumar Mahato		Mahottari 1	27 March 2026		238 days	Giriraj Mani Pokharel
94.	Rabindra Patel		Rautahat 3	27 March 2026		238 days	Prabhu Sah
95.	Ganesh Paudel		Rautahat 4	27 March 2026		238 days	Dev Prasad Timilsena
96.	Dipak Kumar Sah		Mahottari 2	27 March 2026		238 days	Sharat Singh Bhandari
97.	Santosh Rajbanshi		Morang 4	27 March 2026		238 days	Aman Lal Modi
98.	Prakash Gautam		Makwanpur 1	27 March 2026		238 days	Deepak Bahadur Singh
99.	Bikram Thapa		Kapilvastu 2	27 March 2026		238 days	Surendra Raj Acharya
100.	Narendra Kumar Gupta		Nawalparasi 2	27 March 2026		238 days	Dhruba Bahadur Pradhan
101.	Achuttam Lamichhane		Nuwakot 2	27 March 2026		238 days	Arjun Narasingha KC
102.	Devraj Pathak		Dang 1	27 March 2026		238 days	Metmani Chaudhary
103.	Khagendra Sunar		Banke 3	27 March 2026		238 days	Kishore Singh Rathore
104.	Shreedhar Pokharel		Bardiya 2	27 March 2026		238 days	Lalbir Chaudhary
105.	Khem Raj Koirala		Kailali 4	27 March 2026		238 days	Bir Bahadur Balayar
106.	Surya Bahadur Tamang		Udayapur 2	27 March 2026		238 days	Ambar Bahadur Rayamajhi
107.	Suresh Kumar Chaudhary		Banke 1	27 March 2026		238 days	Surya Prasad Dhakal
108.	Ram Binod Yadav		Dhanusha 2	27 March 2026		238 days	Ram Krishna Yadav
109.	Tapeshwor Yadav		Siraha 4	27 March 2026		238 days	Birendra Prasad Mahato
110.	Sushil Kumar Kanu		Parsa 2	27 March 2026		238 days	Ajay Chaurasiya
111.	Kanhaiya Baniya		Rupandehi 4	27 March 2026		238 days	Sarbendra Nath Shukla
112.	Pushpa Kumari Chaudhary		Saptari 1	27 March 2026		238 days	Nawal Kishor Sah
113.	Amarkant Chaudhary		Saptari 3	27 March 2026		238 days	Dinesh Kumar Yadav
114.	Sitaram Sah		Saptari 4	27 March 2026		238 days	Teju Lal Chaudhary
115.	Narendra Sah Kalwar		Sarlahi 3	27 March 2026		238 days	Rameshwar Raya Yadav
116.	Rabin Mahato		Sarlahi 2	27 March 2026		238 days	Mahindra Ray Yadav
117.	Shambhu Kumar Yadav		Siraha 3	27 March 2026		238 days	Lila Nath Shrestha
118.	Krishna Kumar Karki		Morang 2	27 March 2026		238 days	Rishikesh Pokharel
119.	Ramakant Prasad Chaurasiya		Parsa 3	27 March 2026		238 days	Raj Kumar Gupta
120.	Rajesh Kumar Chaudhary		Rautahat 1	27 March 2026		238 days	Madhav Kumar Nepal
121.	Taufique Ahmad Khan		Rupandehi 5	27 March 2026		238 days	Basudev Ghimire
122.	Jhabilal Dumre		Syangja 2	27 March 2026		238 days	Dhanraj Gurung
123.	Chandan Kumar Singh		Bara 2	27 March 2026		238 days	Upendra Yadav
124.	Deepak Kumar Sah		Sunsari 4	27 March 2026		238 days	Gyanendra Bahadur Karki
125.	Jagadish Kharel		Dolakha 1	27 March 2026		238 days	Ganga Karki

==== Proportional Representation (2026–present) ====
No.	MPs	Portrait	Category	Assumed Office	End Office	Tenure
126.	Pratibha Rawal		Khas Arya	27 March 2026		238 days
127.	Lima Adhikari		Khas Arya	27 March 2026		238 days
128.	Samikchya Baskota		Khas Arya	27 March 2026		238 days
129.	Vidhusi Rana		Khas Arya	27 March 2026		238 days
130.	Ramesh Prasai		Khas Arya	27 March 2026		238 days
131.	Prabha Dhakal		Khas Arya	27 March 2026		238 days
132.	Gyanu Poudyal		Khas Arya	27 March 2026		238 days
133.	Ratna Kumari Thapa		Khas Arya	27 March 2026		238 days
134.	Shobha Khanal		Khas Arya	27 March 2026		238 days
135.	Prabha Karki		Khas Arya	27 March 2026		238 days
136.	Manju Bhusal		Khas Arya	27 March 2026		238 days
137.	Shristi Bhattarai		Khas Arya	27 March 2026		238 days
138.	Aakriti Awasthi		Khas Arya	27 March 2026		238 days
139.	Krantishikha Dhital		Khas Arya	27 March 2026		238 days
140.	Tika Sangraula		Khas Arya	27 March 2026		238 days
141.	Shraddha Kunwar Chhetri		Khas Arya	27 March 2026		238 days
142.	Rachana Khatiwada Khatri		Khas Arya	27 March 2026		238 days
143.	Rima Biswokarma		Dalit	27 March 2026		238 days
144.	Sita Badi		Dalit	27 March 2026		238 days
145.	Prakash Chandra Pariyar		Dalit	27 March 2026		238 days
146.	Amrita B.K.		Dalit	27 March 2026		238 days
147.	Khima B.K.		Dalit	27 March 2026		238 days
148.	Tara Bishwakarma		Dalit	27 March 2026		238 days
149.	Sushma Swarnakar		Dalit	27 March 2026		238 days
150.	Smriti Senchuri		Dalit	27 March 2026		238 days
151.	Nisha Mehta		Madeshi	27 March 2026		238 days
152.	Khagendra Karna		Madeshi	27 March 2026		238 days
153.	Kamini Kumari Chaudhary		Madeshi	27 March 2026		238 days
154.	Sarita Mahato		Madeshi	27 March 2026		238 days
155.	Ankita Thakur		Madeshi	27 March 2026		238 days
156.	Lalita Kumari Sah		Madeshi	27 March 2026		238 days
157.	Purushottam Suprabhat Yadav		Madeshi	27 March 2026		238 days
158.	Poonam Kumari Agrawal		Madeshi	27 March 2026		238 days
159.	Sunita Kumari Chaudhary		Madeshi	27 March 2026		238 days
160.	Geeta Chaudhary		Tharu	27 March 2026		238 days
161.	Surendra Chaudhary		Tharu	27 March 2026		238 days
162.	Premlal Chaudhary		Tharu	27 March 2026		238 days
163.	Karishma Kathariya		Tharu	27 March 2026		238 days
164.	Samina Miya		Muslim	27 March 2026		238 days
165.	Afsana Banu		Muslim	27 March 2026		238 days
166.	Gajala Shamim Mikrani		Muslim	27 March 2026		238 days
167.	Anushka Shrestha		Janajati	27 March 2026		238 days
168.	Ojashwi Sherchan		Janajati	27 March 2026		238 days
169.	Mingma Gyabu Sherpa		Janajati	27 March 2026		238 days
170.	Bhumika Shrestha		Janajati	27 March 2026		238 days
171.	Basumaya Tamang		Janajati	27 March 2026		238 days
172.	Ganga Chhantyal		Janajati	27 March 2026		238 days
173.	Sumnima Udas		Janajati	27 March 2026		238 days
174.	Sirjana Shrestha		Janajati	27 March 2026		238 days
175.	Rajani Shrestha		Janajati	27 March 2026		238 days
176.	Kushum Maharjan		Janajati	27 March 2026		238 days
177.	Pramila Kuluju		Janajati	27 March 2026		238 days
178.	Sujata Tamang		Janajati	27 March 2026		238 days
179.	Kripa Maharjan		Janajati	27 March 2026		238 days
180.	Eliza Gurung		Janajati	27 March 2026		238 days
181.	Ram Lama		Janajati	27 March 2026		238 days
182.	Khushbu Sarkar Shrestha		Janajati	27 March 2026		238 days

=== Pratinidhi Shabha (2022–2025) ===
These MPs list of order is based on party power holdings, ministerial rank, and tenure in the House of Representatives.

No.	MPs	Portrait	Assumed office	End office	Tenure	Preceded by	Constituency
1.	Rabi Lamichhane		1 July 2022	27 January 2023	210 days	Position Created	Chitwan 2
1.	Rabi Lamichhane		29 January 2023	12 September 2025	2 years, 226 days	Dol Prasad Aryal	Chitwan 2
2.	Swarnim Wagle		28 April 2023	12 September 2025	2 years, 137 days	Ram Chandra Poudel	Tanahun 1
3.	Sumana Shrestha		22 December 2022	12 September 2025	2 years, 264 days	–	elected as a proportional representative
4.	Dol Prasad Aryal		22 December 2022	12 September 2025	2 years, 264 days	–	elected as a proportional representative
5.	Manish Jha		22 December 2022	12 September 2025	2 years, 264 days	–	elected as a proportional representative
6.	Biraj Bhakta Shrestha		22 December 2022	12 September 2025	2 years, 264 days	Jeevan Ram Shrestha	Kathmandu 8
7.	Toshima Karki		22 December 2022	12 September 2025	2 years, 264 days	Pampha Bhusal	Lalitpur 3
8.	Hari Dhakal		22 December 2022	12 September 2025	2 years, 264 days	Surendra Pandey	Chitwan 1
9.	Shishir Khanal		22 December 2022	12 September 2025	2 years, 264 days	Bhimsen Das Pradhan	Kathmandu 6
10.	Sobita Gautam		22 December 2022	12 September 2025	2 years, 264 days	Madhav Kumar Nepal	Kathmandu 2
11.	Ganesh Parajuli		22 December 2022	12 September 2025	2 years, 264 days	Rambir Manandhar	Kathmandu 7
12.	Santosh Pariyar		22 December 2022	12 September 2025	2 years, 264 days	–	elected as a proportional representative
13.	Indira Ranamagar		22 December 2022	12 September 2025	2 years, 264 days	–	elected as a proportional representative
14.	Chanda Karki		22 December 2022	12 September 2025	2 years, 264 days	–	elected as a proportional representative
15.	Nisha Dangi		22 December 2022	12 September 2025	2 years, 264 days	–	elected as a proportional representative
16.	Asim Shah		22 December 2022	12 September 2025	2 years, 264 days	–	elected as a proportional representative
17.	Shiva Nepali		22 December 2022	12 September 2025	2 years, 264 days	–	elected as a proportional representative
18.	Ashok Kumar Chaudhary		22 December 2022	12 September 2025	2 years, 264 days	–	elected as a proportional representative
19.	Binita Kathayat		22 December 2022	12 September 2025	2 years, 264 days	–	elected as a proportional representative
20.	Laxmi Tiwari		22 December 2022	12 September 2025	2 years, 264 days	–	elected as a proportional representative
21.	Bindabasini Kansakar		22 December 2022	12 September 2025	2 years, 264 days	Dhaka Kumar Shrestha	elected as a proportional representative

== See also ==
- Politics of Nepal
- Ujyaalo Nepal Party
- Pragatisheel Loktantrik Party
