= Minister of Women, Children and Senior Citizens =

Head of the Nepalese Ministry of Women, Children and Senior Citizens

- महिला, बालबालिका तथा ज्येष्ठ नागरिक मन्त्री
- Emblem of Nepal

- Flag of Nepal
- Incumbent; Sita Badi since 27 March 2026
- Ministry of Women, Children and Senior Citizens
- Style: Honourable
- Member of: Council of Ministers
- Reports to: Prime Minister, Parliament
- Seat: Singha Durbar, Nepal
- Nominator: Prime Minister
- Appointer: President
- Term length: No fixed term
- Precursor: Minister of Labour, Employment, Women, Children and Social Security

The Minister of Women, Children and Senior Citizens (Nepali: महिला, बालबालिका तथा ज्येष्ठ नागरिक मन्त्री) is the head of the Ministry of Women, Children and Senior Citizens of the Government of Nepal. One of the senior-most officers in the Federal Cabinet, the minister is responsibility to formulate policies for social and economic empowerment to promote the role of women, children, senior citizens and various sections of the society in the sustainable peace and development of the country.

The current minister is Sita Badi, who assumed office on 27 March 2026 after the formation of new government under Balendra Shah.

== List of former ministers ==
#	Name	Took of office			Prime Minister	Minister's Party
1	Tham Maya Thapa	15 February 2018	20 November 2019	643	KP Sharma Oli	CPN (UML)
1	Tham Maya Thapa	15 February 2018	20 November 2019	643	KP Sharma Oli	NCP
2	Parbat Gurung	21 November 2019	14 October 2020	328	KP Sharma Oli	NCP
3	Lilanath Shrestha	14 October 2020	25 December 2020	72	KP Sharma Oli	NCP
4	Julie Kumari Mahato	25 December 2020	4 June 2021	161	KP Sharma Oli	CPN (UML)
5	Chanda Chaudhary	4 June 2021	22 June 2021	18	KP Sharma Oli	PSP–Nepal
6	Lilanath Shrestha	24 June 2021	12 July 2021	18	KP Sharma Oli	CPN (UML)
–	Sher Bahadur Deuba	13 July 2021	8 October 2021	87	Sher Bahadur Deuba	Nepali Congress
7	Uma Regmi	8 October 2021	26 December 2022	444	Sher Bahadur Deuba	Nepali Congress
–	Pushpa Kamal Dahal	26 December 2022	17 January 2023	22	Puspha Kamal Dahal	CPN (Maoist Centre)
8	Bhagwati Chaudhary	17 January 2023	27 February 2023	41	Puspha Kamal Dahal	CPN (UML)
9	Mahindra Ray Yadav	31 March 2023	7 May 2023	37	Puspha Kamal Dahal	NSP
10	Surendra Raj Acharya	7 May 2023	4 March 2024	302	Puspha Kamal Dahal	Nepali Congress
–	Pushpa Kamal Dahal	4 March 2024	6 March 2024	2	Puspha Kamal Dahal	CPN (MC)
11	Bhagwati Chaudhary	6 March 2024	3 July 2024	119	Puspha Kamal Dahal	CPN (UML)
–	Pushpa Kamal Dahal	4 July 2024	15 July 2024	12	Puspha Kamal Dahal	CPN (MC)
12	Nawal Kishor Sah	15 July 2024	9 September 2025	421	KP Sharma Oli	PSP
Vacant (9 – 12 September 2025)
–	Sushila Karki	12 September 2025	12 December 2025	91	Sushila Karki	Independent
13	Shradha Shrestha	12 December 2025	27 March 2026	105	Sushila Karki	Independent
14	Sita Badi	27 March 2026	Incumbent	220	Balendra Shah	Rastriya Swatantra Party
