= Manish Jha (politician) =

Nepalese politician

Honourable Manish Jha
- मनिष झा

Member of the House of Representatives
- Incumbent
- Assumed office 26 March 2026
- Preceded by: Julie Kumari Mahato
- Constituency: Dhanusha 3
- In office 22 December 2022 – 12 September 2025
- Constituency: Party list

Personal details
- Born: 14 May 1980 (age 46)
- Party: Rastriya Swatantra
- Parents: Ram Narayan Jha (father); Bijaya Laxmi (mother)

Manish Jha (Note: Nepali: डा. स्वर्णिम वाग्ले) is a Nepalese politician who is currently serving as a member of the House of Representatives of Nepal. He is also the spokesperson of the Rastriya Swatantra Party. He served as the member of the 2nd Federal Parliament of Nepal elected as a proportional representative from the Madheshi category in the 2022 Nepalese General Election.

== See also ==
- Ujyaalo Nepal Party
