= Anita Devi Sah =

Nepalese politician and Minister

Honourable Anita Devi Sah

Minister of Federal Affairs and General Administration
- In office 14 August 2023 – 4 March 2024
- President: Ram Chandra Poudel
- Prime Minister: Puspha Kamal Dahal
- Preceded by: Aman Lal Modi
- Succeeded by: Bhanu Bhakta Joshi

Member of Parliament, Pratinidhi Sabha (PR)
- Incumbent
- Assumed office 22 December 2022
- Constituency: Madesh

Personal details
- Born: May 4, 1982 (age 44)
- Party: Janamat Party
- Other party: Janamat Party
- Spouse: Sanjay Kumar Sah
- Parents: Yamuna Sah (father); Dibya Kala Devi Sah (mother)

Anita Devi Sah is a Nepalese politician, belonging to the Janamat Party. She is currently serving as a member of the 2nd Federal Parliament of Nepal. In the 2022 Nepalese general election she was elected as a proportional representative from the Madheshi people category. She is the minister of federal affairs and general administration for Third Dahal cabinet.
