= Chanda Chaudhary =

Nepali politician

- चन्दा चौधरी

43th Minister of Women, Children and Senior Citizens of Nepal
- In office 6 June 2021 – 22 June 2021
- President: Bidya Devi Bhandari
- Prime Minister: K. P. Sharma Oli
- Vice President: Nanda Kishor Pun
- Preceded by: Julie Kumari Mahato
- Succeeded by: Lilanath Shrestha

Member of Parliament, Pratinidhi Sabha for Rastriya Janata Party list
- Incumbent
- Assumed office 4 March 2018

Personal details
- Born: 18 July 1974 (age 52)
- Party: Nepali Congress
- Other political affiliations: TMLP; RJPN; PSP-N; Loktantrik Samajwadi (before 2022)
- Education: Anuragh Narayan College, Patna
- Cabinet: Oli cabinet, 2018

Chanda Chaudhary is a Nepali politician and was Minister of Women, Children and Senior Citizens since 4 June 2021 but was removed from the post by Supreme Court on 22 June 2021 making the tenure of just 18 days and shortest till date. She was a member of the House of Representatives of the federal parliament of Nepal. She was elected to the parliament representing Rastriya Janata Party Nepal. In an interview, Chanda said that she is in favour of the death penalty for those convicted of rape.

== Awards and recognition ==
- She was one of the recipients of She the change – Nari Udyami Awards 2019, awarded jointly by Gandhi Smriti foundation and Darshan Samiti B and S Foundation.
- She is the founding chair of Nepal India Women Friendship Society.

== Other positions held ==
- Former Assistant Minister Youth and Sports,
- Nepal India Women Friendship Society (President)
- Terai Madhesh Democratic Party (Central Member)
- Terai Madhesh Women Association (President)
- Co-ordinator, People of Indian Origin Chamber of Commerce & Industry (PIOCCI), Nepal
