= Uma Regmi =

Nepali politician

Honourable Uma Regmi
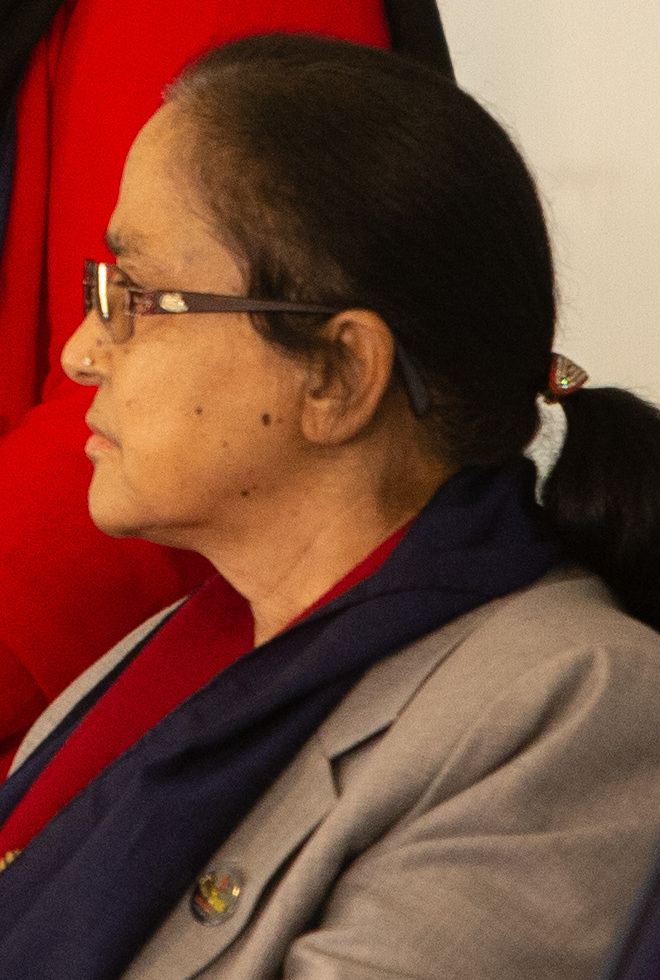
- Regmi in 2021

Minister of Women, Children and Senior Citizens of Nepal
- In office 8 October 2021 – 26 December 2022
- President: Bidhya Devi Bhandari
- Prime Minister: Sher Bahadur Deuba
- Preceded by: Lila Nath Shrestha
- Succeeded by: Bhagwati Chaudhary

Member of Parliament, Pratinidhi Sabha for Nepali Congress party list
- In office 4 March 2018 – 18 September 2022

Member of Constituent Assembly for Nepali Congress Party List
- In office 28 May 2008 – 28 May 2012

Member of Parliament, Pratinidhi Sabha
- In office May 1991 – August 1994
- Preceded by: Constituency created
- Succeeded by: Dev Bahadur Paudel Chhettri
- Constituency: Parbat 2

Personal details
- Born: 15 July 1954 (age 71) Chitwan District, Nepal
- Party: Nepali Congress
- Children: 1 Son: Bijay Adhikari, Born: October 1983
- Parents: Khadananda Regmi (father); Laxmi Devi Regmi (mother)

Uma Regmi (Nepali: उमा रेग्मी), is a Nepali politician and former Minister for Women, Children and Senior Citizens of Nepal. She is a member of House of Representatives selected through PR (proportional representation) system, belongs to the Nepali Congress party. Regmi is also the current President of the Nepal Women Association (NWA) which is a sister wing of Nepali Congress.
