= Shambhu Kumar Yadav =

Nepalese politician and medical doctor

Honourable Shambhu Kumar Yadav

Member of Parliament, Pratinidhi Sabha
- Preceded by: Lila Nath Shrestha
- Constituency: Siraha 3

Personal details
- Born: 29 December 1984 (age 41) Siraha, Siraha District, Madhesh Province
- Party: Rastriya Swatantra Party
- Parent: Ram Sundar Raut (father)
- Occupation: Politician, Medical doctor

Shambhu Kumar Yadav (Nepali: शम्भु कुमार यादव) is a Nepalese politician, Medical doctor and currently a member of Pratinidhi Sabha from Rastriya Swatantra Party.

He has been a member of the Rastriya Swatantra Party since its formation. In the 2026 general election, he won from Siraha 3 with 32,249 votes, defeating Lila Nath Shrestha, former minister and seating MP of the CPN (Unified Marxist–Leninist).

== Early life ==
Yadav was born in Paterwa (now Siraha), Siraha District on 29 December 1984 in a Maithil Yadav family.Yadav completed his higher education from Patna, Bihar and MBBS from Zhengzhou University, Henan, China.

== Professional Career ==
He worked as a Medical Doctor at B & B Hospital for 2 years and at KIST Medical College for 1 year. He moved back to his home district and started Mirchaiya Health Polyclinic, located in Mirchaiya, Siraha.

== Electoral performance ==
Election	Year	Constituency	Contested for	Political party	Result	Votes	% of votes
Nepal general election	2026	Siraha 3	Pratinidhi Sabha member	Rastriya Swatantra Party	Won	32,249	45.84%
