= Ashok Kumar Chaudhary =

Nepalese politician

Honourable Ashok Kumar Chaudhary
- अशोककुमार चौधरी

Member of Parliament, Pratinidhi Sabha
- In office 22 December 2022 – 26 March 2026
- President: Bidya Devi Bhandari
- Prime Minister: Pushpa Kamal Dahal K. P. Sharma Oli Sushila Karki (interim)
- Constituency: Party List
- Incumbent
- Assumed office 26 March 2026
- President: Ram Chandra Poudel
- Prime Minister: Balen Shah
- Preceded by: Bijay Kumar Gachhadar
- Constituency: Sunsari-3

Personal details
- Born: April 18, 1983 (age 43)
- Party: Rastriya Swatantra Party
- Spouse: Jiwan kumari Chaudhary
- Children: 2
- Parents: Balram Chaudhary (father); Hariwati Chaudhary (mother)

Ashok Kumar Chaudhary (Note: Nepali: अशोककुमार चौधरी) (born 18 April 1983) is a Nepalese politician, belonging to the Rastriya Swatantra Party. He is currently serving as a member of the 3rd Federal Parliament of Nepal. In the 2022 Nepalese general election he was elected as a proportional representative from the Tharu people category. In the 2026 Nepalese general election he won the constituency of Sunsari 3.
