= Julie Kumari Mahato =

Nepali politician

Honourable Juli Kumari Mahato
- जुली कुमारी महतो

Minister of Women, Children and Senior Citizens of Nepal
- In office 25 December 2020 – 4 June 2021
- President: Bidya Devi Bhandari
- Prime Minister: K. P. Sharma Oli
- Preceded by: Lila Nath Shrestha
- Succeeded by: Chanda Chaudhary

Member of Parliament, Pratinidhi Sabha
- In office 22 December 2022 – 12 September 2025
- Preceded by: Rajendra Mahato
- Succeeded by: Manish Jha (elect)
- Constituency: Dhanusha 3

Member of Parliament, Pratinidhi Sabha for CPN (UML) party list
- In office 4 March 2018 – 18 September 2022

Member of Constituent Assembly for CPN (UML) party list
- In office 28 May 2008 – 28 May 2012

Personal details
- Born: 26 May 1976 (age 50) Siraha District
- Party: CPN (UML)
- Spouse: Raghubir Mahaseth

Juli Kumari Mahato (Nepali: जुली कुमारी महतो) is a Nepali communist politician. She was a member of the House of Representatives of the federal parliament of Nepal until it was dissolved in the wake of the Gen Z protest. Mahato, a former Minister of Women, Children and Senior Citizens was elected in the 2017 Nepalese general election, from CPN (UML) under the proportional representation system.

In the 2013 elections for the second constituent assembly, she was a candidate for CPN (UML) from Dhanusa-3 constituency but lost to Nepali Congress leader Bimalendra Nidhi by roughly 6,500 votes. She was elected a member of the Pratinidhi Sabha from the same constituency in 2022 Nepalese general election by defeating Anil Kumar Jha.

A long time politician, Mahato's house was set on fire by protesters in 2025 September, which went viral in the media.

== Electoral history ==
=== 2013 Constituent Assembly election ===
Party	Candidate	Votes
Nepali Congress	Bimalendra Nidhi	20,000
CPN (Unified Marxist–Leninist)	Juli Kumari Mahato	13,539
UCPN (Maoist)	Haridev Mandal	2,523
Others		5,065
Result	Congress hold	
Source: NepalNews
