= Sunsari 3 =

Parliamentary constituency in Nepal

- Parliamentary constituency
- Sunsari 3 in Province No. 1
- Province: Province No. 1
- District: Sunsari District

Current constituency
- Created: 1991
- Party: Rastriya Swatantra Party
- Member of Parliament: Ashok Kumar Chaudhary
- Member of the Provincial Assembly: Lilam Basnet, NCP (UML)
- Member of the Provincial Assembly: Agam Lal Chaudhary, NC

Sunsari 3 is one of four parliamentary constituencies of Sunsari District in Nepal. This constituency came into existence on the Constituency Delimitation Commission (CDC) report submitted on 31 August 2017.

== Incorporated areas ==
Sunsari 3 incorporates Gadhi Rural Municipality, Barju Rural Municipality, Duhabi Municipality, ward 7 of Inaruwa Municipality and wards 6–15 of Itahari Sub-metropolitan City.

== Assembly segments ==
It encompasses the following Province No. 1 Provincial Assembly segment

- Sunsari 3(A)
- Sunsari 3(B)

== Members of Parliament ==
=== Parliament/Constituent Assembly ===
Election	Member	Party
1991	Girija Prasad Koirala	Nepali Congress
1992 by-election	Prakash Koirala	Nepali Congress
1994	Laxman Prasad Mehta	Nepali Congress
2008	Bijay Kumar Gachhadar	Madheshi Janaadhikar Forum, Nepal
June 2009	Bijay Kumar Gachhadar	Madheshi Janaadhikar Forum, Nepal (Democratic)
April 2017	Bijay Kumar Gachhadar	Nepal Loktantrik Forum
2017	Bijay Kumar Gachhadar	Nepali Congress
2022	Bhagwati Chaudhary	CPN (Unified Marxist–Leninist)
2026	Ashok Kumar Chaudhary	Rastriya Swatantra Party

=== Provincial Assembly ===
==== 3(A) ====
Election	Member	Party
2017	Lilam Basnet	CPN (Unified Marxist-Leninist)
May 2018	Lilam Basnet	Nepal Communist Party

==== 3(B) ====
Election	Member	Party
2017	Agam Lal Chaudhary	Nepali Congress

== Election results ==
=== Election in the 2020s ===
==== 2022 general election ====
Candidate	Party	Votes	%
Bhagwati Chaudhary	CPN (UML)	40,788	46.82
Bijay Kumar Gachhadar	Nepali Congress	35,600	40.87
Kamal Babu Mainali	Rastriya Swatantra Party	6,453	7.41
Kuldeep Chaudhary	Rastriya Prajatantra Party	1,903	2.18
Others		2,370	2.72
Total		87,114	100.00
Majority		5,188	
CPN (UML) gain			

=== Election in the 2010s ===
==== 2017 legislative elections ====
Party	Candidate	Votes
Nepali Congress	Bijay Kumar Gachhadar	38,972
CPN (Unified Marxist–Leninist)	Bhagwati Chaudhary	38,651
Federal Socialist Forum, Nepal	Padma Kumar Adhikari	1,854
Independent	Mohammad Nasiruddin Miya	1,063
Others		839
Invalid votes		3,655
Result	Congress gain	
Source: Election Commission

==== 2017 Nepalese provincial elections ====
===== 3(A) =====
Party	Candidate	Votes
CPN (Unified Marxist–Leninist)	Lilam Basnet	19,665
Nepali Congress	Kumar Jang Thapa	17,681
Others		1,754
Invalid votes		1,178
Result	CPN (UML) gain	
Source: Election Commission

===== 3(B) =====
Party	Candidate	Votes
Nepali Congress	Agam Lal Chaudhary	21,429
CPN (Unified Marxist–Leninist)	Ramdev Yadav	17,568
Federal Socialist Forum, Nepal	Abadh Narayan Yadav	2,417
Others		1,279
Invalid votes		2,034
Result	Congress gain	
Source: Election Commission

==== 2013 Constituent Assembly election ====
Party	Candidate	Votes
Madheshi Janaadhikar Forum, Nepal (Democratic)	Bijay Kumar Gachhadar	17,524
CPN (Unified Marxist–Leninist)	Bhagwati Chaudhary	17,162
Nepali Congress	Goma Kumari Parajuli (Ansari)	7,865
Madheshi Janaadhikar Forum, Nepal	Ranjit Gosai	2,435
UCPN (Maoist)	Haider Ali Miya	1,099
Others		3,482
Result	MJFN (D) gain	
Source: NepalNews

=== Election in the 2000s ===
==== 2008 Constituent Assembly election ====
Party	Candidate	Votes
Madheshi Janaadhikar Forum, Nepal	Bijay Kumar Gachhadar	23,769
Nepali Congress	Agam Lal Chuadhary	10,806
CPN (Unified Marxist–Leninist)	Shri Kumari Tharuni	5,723
CPN (Maoist)	Ram Kumari Chaudhary	5,071
CPN (Marxist–Leninist)	Krishna Lal Das Tharu	1,194
Rastriya Janamukti Party	Sajjan Rishidev	1,191
Others		3,821
Invalid votes		3,071
Result	MJFN gain	
Source: Election Commission

=== Election in the 1990s ===
==== 1999 legislative elections ====
Party	Candidate	Votes
Nepali Congress	Laxman Prasad Mehta	19,654
Rastriya Prajatantra Party	Narendra Kumar Chaudhary	17,668
CPN (Unified Marxist–Leninist)	Fani Lal Chaudhary	5,843
Others		3,022
Invalid Votes		2,121
Result	Congress hold	
Source: Election Commission

==== 1994 legislative elections ====
Party	Candidate	Votes
Nepali Congress	Laxman Prasad Mehta	16,341
CPN (Unified Marxist–Leninist)	Dharma Raj Niraula	12,081
Rastriya Prajatantra Party	Narendra Kumar Chaudhary	9,565
Independent	Jay Hari Sharma	1,551
Others		2,398
Result	Congress hold	
Source: Election Commission

==== 1992 by-elections ====
Party	Candidate
Nepali Congress	Prakash Koirala
Result	Congress hold

==== 1991 legislative elections ====
Party	Candidate	Votes
Nepali Congress	Girija Prasad Koirala	27,469
CPN (Unified Marxist–Leninist)	Prabhu Narayan Chaudhary	18,023
Result	Congress gain	

== See also ==
- List of parliamentary constituencies of Nepal
