= Sushila Sirpali Thakuri =

Nepalese politician

Honourable Sushila Sirpali Thakuri
- सुशिला सिर्पाली ठकुरी

Minister of State in the Ministry of Culture, Tourism and Civil Aviation
- Incumbent
- Assumed office 17 January 2023
- President: Bidya Devi Bhandari; Ram Chandra Poudel
- Prime Minister: Pushpa Kamal Dahal
- Minister: Sudan Kirati
- Preceded by: Dhan Bahadur Buda

Member of Parliament, Pratinidhi Sabha for CPN (Maoist Centre)
- Incumbent
- Assumed office 22 December 2022

Personal details
- Party: CPN (Maoist Centre)
- Other party: CPN (Maoist Centre)
- Spouse: Dammar Singh Thakuri
- Parents: Dhan Bahadur (father); Romi Devi (mother)

Sushila Sirpali Thakuri is a Nepalese politician, belonging to the CPN (Maoist Centre) Party. She is currently serving as a member of the 2nd Federal Parliament of Nepal. In the 2022 Nepalese general election she was elected as a proportional representative from the Dalit people category.
