= Bhagwati Chaudhary =

Nepali politician

- भगवती चौधरी

Minister of Women, Children and Senior Citizens of Nepal
- In office 6 March 2024 – 3 July 2024
- President: Ram Chandra Poudel
- Prime Minister: Pushpa Kamal Dahal
- Preceded by: Surendra Raj Acharya
- Succeeded by: Nawal Kishor Sah
- In office 17 January 2022 – 27 February 2023
- President: Bidya Devi Bhandari
- Prime Minister: Pushpa Kamal Dahal
- Preceded by: Uma Regmi
- Succeeded by: Surendra Raj Acharya

Minister of State for Forests and Soil Conservation of Nepal
- In office 12 April 2011 – 29 August 2011
- President: Ram Baran Yadav
- Prime Minister: Jhala Nath Khanal
- Minister: Bhanu Bhakta Joshi

Member of Parliament, Pratinidhi Sabha
- In office 26 December 2022 – 26 March 2026
- Preceded by: Bijay Kumar Gachhadar
- Succeeded by: Ashok Kumar Chaudhary
- Constituency: Sunsari 3

Personal details
- Born: 15 April 1971 (age 55) Sunsari District
- Party: CPN (Unified Marxist-Leninist)
- Parents: Viran Lal Chaudhary (father); Litiya Devi Tharuni Chaudhary (mother)

Bhagwati Chaudhary is a Nepalese politician, belonging to the CPN (UML) who served as a member of the 2nd Federal Parliament of Nepal. In the 2022 Nepalese general election, she was elected from the Sunsari 3 (constituency).
