= Ministry of Women, Children, Gender and Sexual Minorities and Social Security =

Federal ministry of Nepal

- महिला, बालबालिका, लैंगिक तथा यौनिक अल्पसंख्यक र सामाजिक सुरक्षा मन्त्रालय
- Emblem of Nepal

Agency overview
- Formed: 13 May 2026
- Preceding agencies: Ministry of Women, Children and Senior Citizens; Ministry of Labour, Employment and Social Security
- Jurisdiction: Government of Nepal
- Headquarters: Singha Durbar, Kathmandu
- Minister responsible: Sita Badi, Cabinet Minister
- Website: mowcsc.gov.np

The Ministry of Women, Children, Gender and Sexual Minorities and Social Security (Nepali: महिला, बालबालिका, लैङ्गिक तथा यौनिक अल्पसङ्ख्यक र सामाजिक सुरक्षा मन्त्रालय) is a federal ministry of Nepal established on 13 May 2026, responsible for the protection of marginalised groups and the administration of national social security net.

This ministry was formed by the merger of former Ministry of Women, Children and Senior Citizens with the Social Security wing of Ministry of Labour, Employment and Social Security as part of a broader administrative restructuring by the Balendra Shah-led government under Nepal Government (Work Division) Regulations, 2083.
