= Sita Badi =

Nepalese Minister of Women, Children and Senior Citizen since 2026

- सीता बादी

Minister of Women, Children, Gender and Sexual Minorities and Social Security
- Incumbent
- Assumed office 14 May 2026
- President: Ram Chandra Poudel
- Prime Minister: Balendra Shah
- Preceded by: Position established
Ministerial positions
Minister of Women, Children and Senior Citizens
In office 27 March 2026 – 14 May 2026
President	Ram Chandra Poudel
Prime Minister	Balendra Shah
Preceded by	Shraddha Shrestha
Succeeded by	Ministry dissolved (succeeded by Ministry of Women, Children, Gender and Sexual Minorities and Social Security)

Member of Parliament, Pratinidhi Sabha
- Incumbent
- Assumed office 27 March 2026
- Constituency: PR

Personal details
- Born: 1995 (age 30–31) Birendranagar, Nepal
- Citizenship: Nepali
- Party: Rastriya Swatantra Party
- Spouse: Suresh Purkuti
- Parents: Gopal Badi (father); Parbati Badi (mother)
- Education: Puspalal Memorial College (BA)

Sita Badi (Note: Nepali: सीता बादी) (born 1995) is a Nepalese politician from the marginalized Badi community and serving as a minister of women, children and senior Citizens under the prime minister, Balen Shah. She became the first person from this community to serve as a federal minister in Nepal.

She is a member of parliament from the Rastriya Swatantra Party.

== Political career ==
Badi was elected to the Pratinidhi Sabha from Rastriya Swatantra Party at the 2026 general election. She was elected from the party list under the Dalit female cluster.
