= Surendra Raj Acharya =

Nepalese politician

Honourable Surendra Raj Acharya
- सुरेन्द्र राज आचार्य

Minister of Women, Children and Senior Citizens of Nepal
- In office 7 May 2023 – 4 March 2024
- President: Ram Chandra Poudel
- Prime Minister: Pushpa Kamal Dahal
- Preceded by: Bhagwati Chaudhary
- Succeeded by: Bhagwati Chaudhary

Member of Parliament, Pratinidhi Sabha
- In office 22 December 2022 – 12 September 2025
- Succeeded by: Bikram Thapa
- Constituency: Kapilvastu 2 (constituency)

Personal details
- Born: 13 April 1958 (age 68) Kapilvastu District
- Party: Nepali Congress
- Other political affiliations: Nepali Congress
- Spouse: Jiwan Acharya
- Parent: Yuvaraj Acharya (father)

Surendra Raj Acharya is a Nepalese politician, belonging to the Nepali Congress currently serving as the member of the 2nd Federal Parliament of Nepal. In the 2022 Nepalese general election, he won the election from Kapilvastu 2 (constituency).
