= Lila Nath Shrestha =

Nepali politician

Honourable Lila Nath Shrestha
- लिलानाथ श्रेष्ठ

Minister of Law, Justice and Parliamentary Affairs
- In office 25 December 2020 – 12 July 2021
- President: Bidya Devi Bhandari
- Prime Minister: KP Oli
- Preceded by: Shiva Maya Tumbahamphe
- Succeeded by: Gyanendra Bahadur Karki

Minister of Land Management, Cooperatives and Poverty Alleviation
- In office 24 June 2021 – 12 July 2021
- President: Bidya Devi Bhandari
- Prime Minister: KP Oli
- Preceded by: Laxman Lal Karna

Minister of Culture, Tourism and Civil Aviation
- In office 24 June 2021 – 12 July 2021
- President: Bidya Devi Bhandari
- Prime Minister: KP Oli
- Preceded by: Uma Shankar Aragriya

Minister of Federal Affairs and General Administration
- In office 24 June 2021 – 12 July 2021
- President: Bidya Devi Bhandari
- Prime Minister: KP Oli
- Preceded by: Ganesh Kumar Pahadi

Minister of Women, Children and Senior Citizens
- In office 14 October 2020 – 25 December 2020
- President: Bidya Devi Bhandari
- Prime Minister: KP Oli
- Preceded by: Parbat Gurung
- Succeeded by: Julie Kumari Mahato
- In office 24 June 2021 – 12 July 2021
- President: Bidya Devi Bhandari
- Prime Minister: Khadga Prasad Sharma Oli
- Preceded by: Julie Kumari Mahato
- Succeeded by: Uma Regmi

Member of Parliament, Pratinidhi Sabha
- Incumbent
- Assumed office 4 March 2018
- Preceded by: Sita Devi Yadav
- Constituency: Siraha 3

Personal details
- Born: 28 January 1962 (age 64)
- Party: CPN (UML)

Lila Nath Shrestha (born 28 January 1962) is a Nepali communist politician and a member of the House of Representatives of the federal parliament of Nepal. He was the former Minister of Law, Justice and Parliamentary Affairs and also served as Minister of Women, Children and Senior Citizens.

== Biography ==
Born on 28 January 1962 to Jit Bahadur and Dhan Maya Shrestha, in Chandralalpur-2 of Siraha, he is a graduate in Law and has two children – a son and a daughter.

He joined politics as a student in 1980, and went on to become a prominent member of the student wing of CPN ML, ANNFSU, and later the youth wing of CPN UML. He was a long-time member and prominent leader of CPN UML in Siraha District, until the party's dissolution in 2018. Following the merger of CPN UML and CPN (Maoist Centre), he was appointed the "District Incharge" of Siraha for the newly formed Nepal Communist Party (NCP).

He was the candidate for the second constituent assembly in the 2013 election from CPN UML, but was defeated by Pushpa Kamal Dahal, chairman of the CPN (Maoist) party.

He was finally elected to the House of Representatives for the first time in the 2017 legislative election. He was elected from Siraha-3 constituency under the first-past-the-post system representing CPN UML of the left alliance. He defeated his nearest rival, Asheswor Yadav, by a margin of 23,227 votes to Yadav's 21,220.

== See also ==
- Pramod Kumar Yadav
