= 2022 Nepalese general election =

2022 election for members of the House of Representatives

- 20 November 2022

All 275 seats in the House of Representatives 138 seats needed for a majority
- Opinion polls
- Registered: 17,988,570
- Turnout: 61.85% (▼6.78 pp; Const. votes); 61.41% (▼7.22 pp; PR votes)
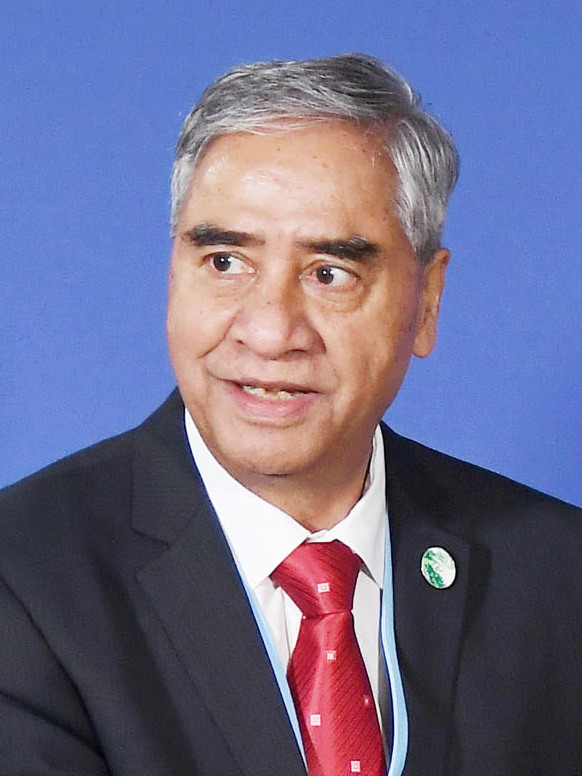

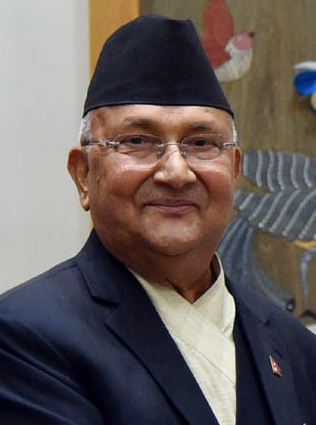

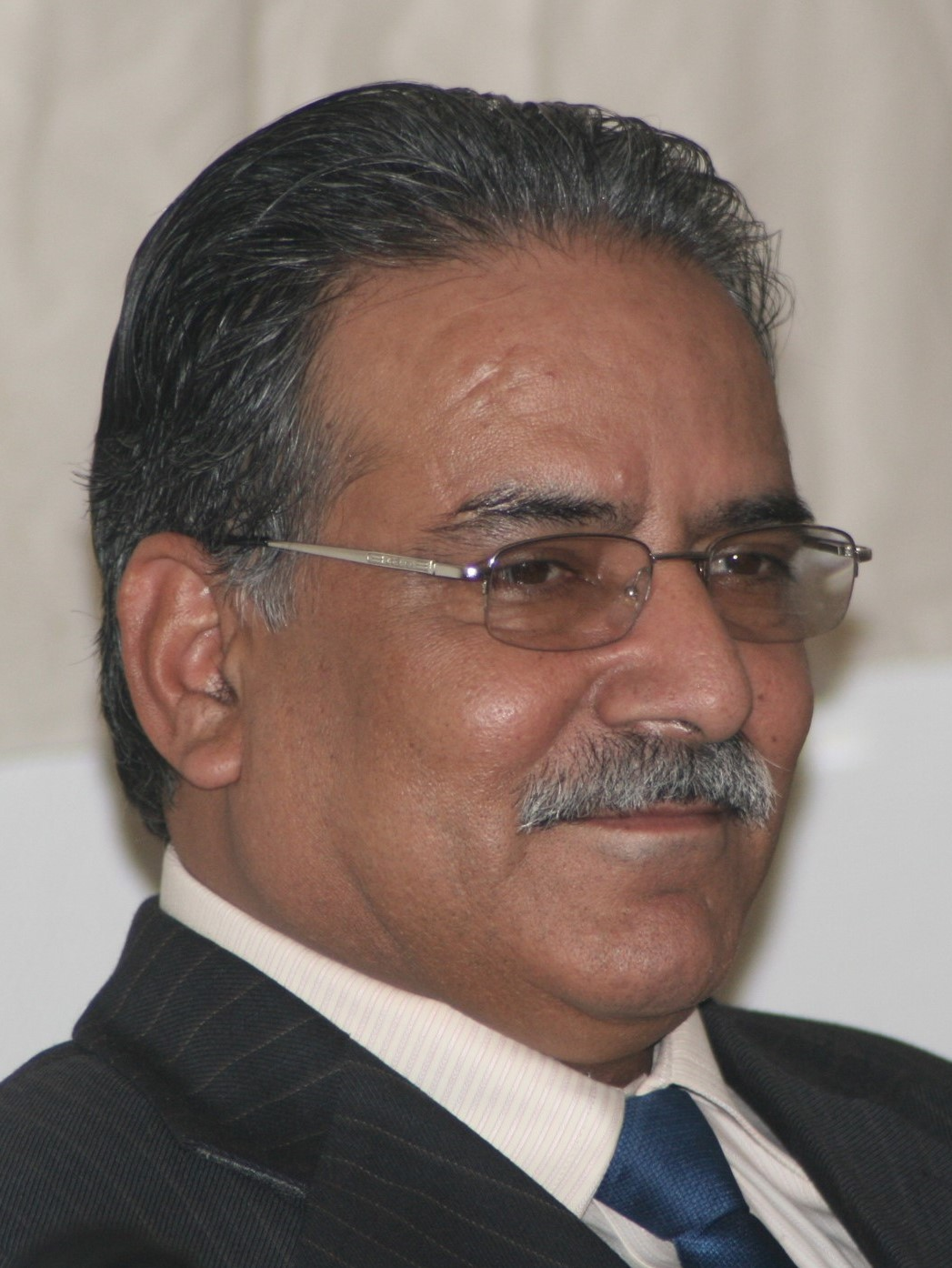

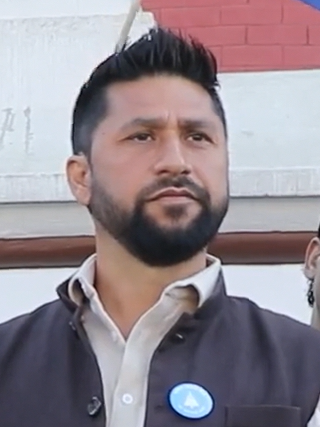

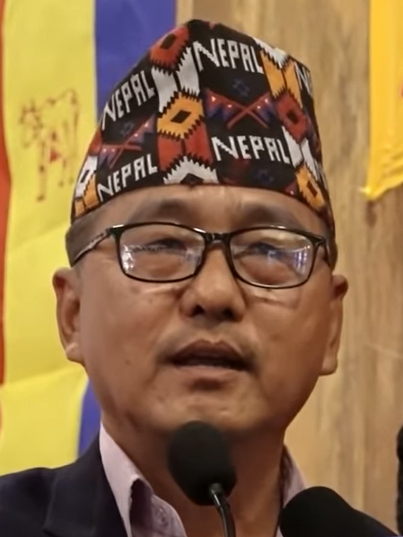

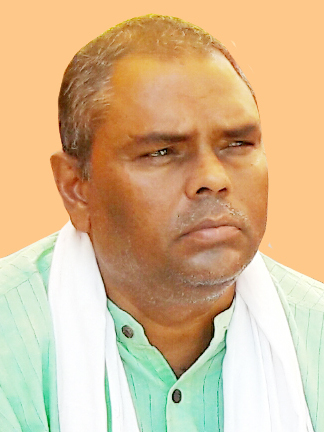

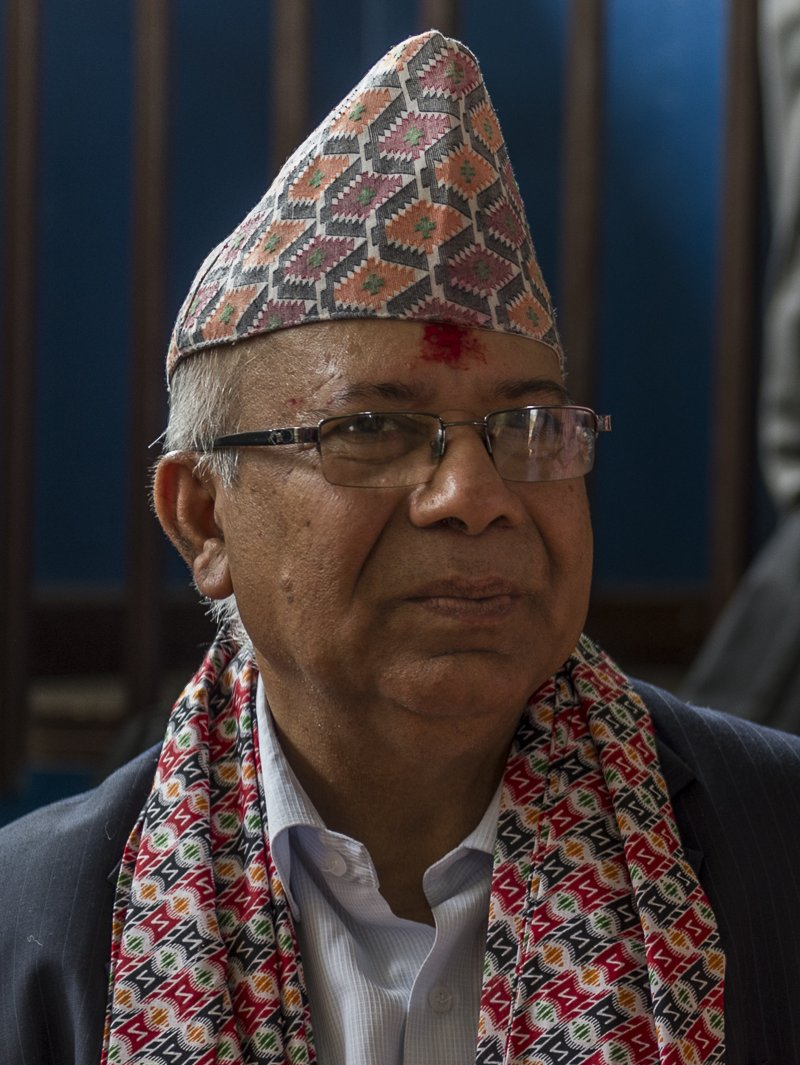

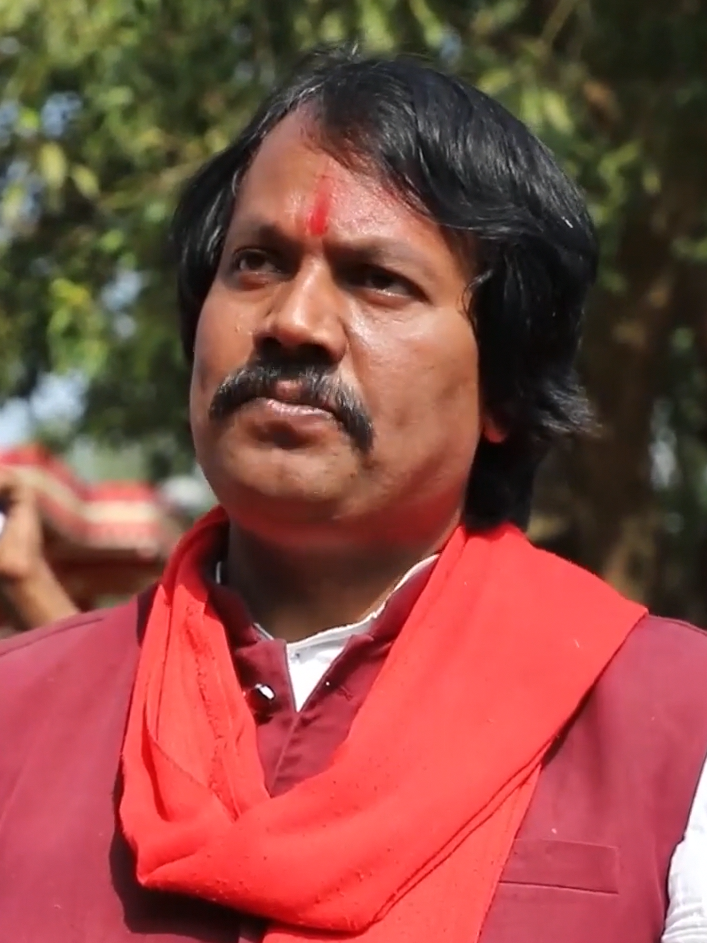

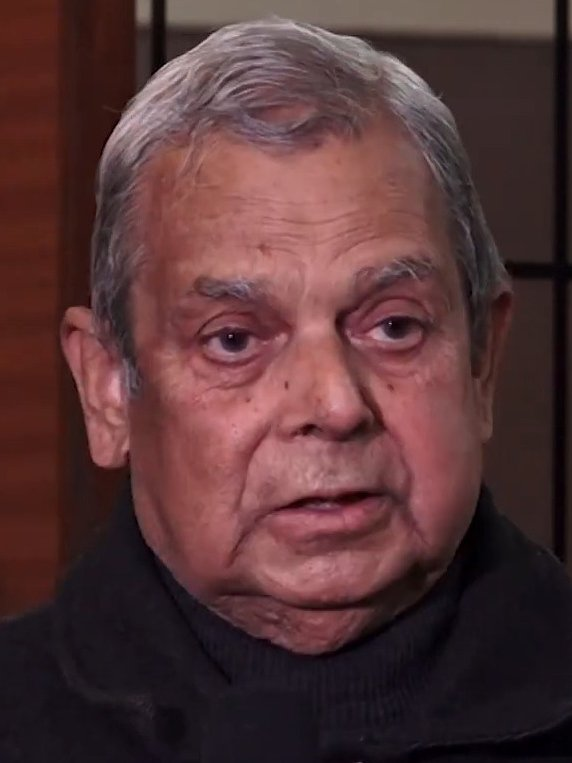
	First party	Second party	Third party
Leader	Sher Bahadur Deuba	K. P. Sharma Oli	Pushpa Kamal Dahal
Party	Congress	CPN (UML)	Maoist Centre
Leader since	7 March 2016	8 March 2021	8 March 2021
Leader's seat	Dadeldhura 1	Jhapa 5	Gorkha 2
Last election	32.78%, 63 seats	33.25%, 121 seats	13.66%, 53 seats
Seats won	89	78	32
Seat change	▲26	▼43	▼21
Constituency vote	2,431,907	3,233,567	982,826
% and swing	23.19% (▼9.59 pp)	30.83% (▼2.42 pp)	9.37% (▼4.29 pp)
Proportional vote	2,715,225	2,845,641	1,175,684
% and swing	25.71% (▼7.07 pp)	26.95% (▼6.30 pp)	11.13% (▼2.53 pp)
	Fourth party	Fifth party	Sixth party
Leader	Rabi Lamichhane	Rajendra Prasad Lingden	Upendra Yadav
Party	RSP	RPP	PSP-Nepal
Leader since	1 July 2022	5 December 2021	c. April 2020
Leader's seat	Chitwan 2	Jhapa 3	Saptari 2 (lost)
Last election	New entry	2.06%, 1 seat	New entry
Seats won	20	14	12
Seat change	New entry	▲13	New entry
Constituency vote	815,023	549,340	379,337
% and swing	7.77%	5.24% (▲3.18 pp)	3.62%
Proportional vote	1,130,344	588,849	421,314
% and swing	10.70%	5.58% (▲3.52 pp)	3.99%
	Seventh party	Eighth party	Ninth party
Leader	Madhav Kumar Nepal	CK Raut	Mahantha Thakur
Party	Unified Socialist	Janamat	Loktantrik Samajwadi
Leader since	c. August 2021	c. March 2019	c. August 2021
Leader's seat	Rautahat 1	Saptari 2	Mahottari 3
Last election	New entry	New entry	New entry
Seats won	10	6	4
Seat change	New entry	New entry	New entry
Constituency vote	436,020	292,554	169,692
% and swing	4.16%	2.79%	1.62%
Proportional vote	298,391	394,655	167,367
% and swing	2.83%	3.74%	1.58%
- Results by constituency
Prime Minister before election
Sher Bahadur Deuba
Congress
Prime Minister after election
Pushpa Kamal Dahal
Maoist Centre

General elections were held in Nepal on 20 November 2022 to elect the 275 members of the House of Representatives. There were two ballots in the election; one to elect 165 members from single-member constituencies via FPTP, and the other to elect the remaining 110 members from a single nation-wide constituency via party-list proportional representation.

The election was held alongside provincial elections for the seven provincial assemblies.

After power sharing talks between the outgoing Democratic Left Alliance broke down on 25 December 2022, CPN (Maoist Centre) chairman Pushpa Kamal Dahal became prime minister, its eight-member cabinet consisting of MPs from his party, CPN (UML), Rastriya Swatantra Party and Janamat Party, with the confidence and supply of RPP, JSP, NUP and three independents.

== Background ==
The 5th House of Representatives elected in 2017 had a five-year term ending in March 2023. In May 2018, the CPN (Unified Marxist–Leninist) and CPN (Maoist Centre) parties merged to form the Nepal Communist Party. The merger between the two coalition partners took their total strength in the House of Representatives to 174. The leaders of the two parties had an agreement to share the post of Prime Minister with the CPN (Unified Marxist–Leninist) chairman K. P. Sharma Oli handing over the post to Maoist Centre chairman Pushpa Kamal Dahal after two and a half years. On 20 November 2019, the two leaders agreed to let Oli complete his full term as prime minister. In a secretariat meeting of the Nepal Communist Party on 14 November 2020, Dahal presented a political document which accused Oli not following party orders and being individualistic. In response to Dahal, Oli rejected Dahal's accusations and presented his own political document which accused Dahal of not letting Oli run the government. As the strife within the party continued, Oli requested President Bidya Devi Bhandari to dissolve the House of Representatives on 20 December 2020 as a no-confidence motion was being prepared against him. In protest of the decision by Oli, seven ministers of the cabinet resigned.

The House of Representatives was reinstated on 23 February 2021 but on 7 March 2021, deciding on a separate writ, the Supreme Court annulled the decision of the Election Commission to grant the name Nepal Communist Party to the party created by merger of the CPN (Unified Marxist–Leninist) and CPN (Maoist Centre), and positioned them to their pre merger status. The CPN (Maoist Centre) withdrew its support from the government on 5 May 2021 and Oli failed to obtain a vote of confidence while a faction of his own party boycotted the vote.

On 13 May 2021, Oli was appointed minority prime minister as the leader of the party in parliament with the highest seats. Rather than retake a vote of confidence, Oli started the process of formation of government through provision of Article 76(5), which was challenged in the Supreme Court. Sher Bahadur Deuba claimed signed support of 149 MPs, including 26 from the CPN (Unified Marxist–Leninist) and 13 from the People's Socialist Party, Nepal. Oli claimed support of all MPs of the CPN (UML) and the People's Socialist Party, Nepal. President Bhandari decided on 22 May 2021 that both claims were inadequate and announced the dissolution of the House of Representatives, leading to widespread opposition. On 12 July 2021, the Supreme Court ruled the dissolution of parliament invalid, while ordering the appointment of Deuba as prime minister, as per article 76(5), by submitting 149 signatures to the President, which is a majority of 271 members present in the House of Representatives.

A cabinet meeting on 4 August 2022 decided on holding the next general election on 20 November 2022. The House of Representatives was finally dissolved on 18 September 2022 after the completion of its five-year term.

== Timetable ==
The key dates are listed below:

4 August	Last date to register to be on electoral roll
4 August	Cabinet announces election date
16 August	Last day for party registration at Election Commission
17 September	Tenure of Legislature parliament ended
19 September	Parties submit preliminary closed list for proportional representation
28 September	Election code of conduct starts
9 October	Candidate nomination for first past the post
26 October	Closed list for proportional representation finalized and published
20 November	Election day
14 December	Final results announced
15 December	Final results presented to President

== Electoral system ==
The 275 members of the legislature are elected by two methods; 165 are elected from single-member constituencies by first-past-the-post voting and 110 seats are elected by closed list proportional representation from a single nationwide constituency. Voters receive separate ballot papers for the two methods. A party or electoral alliance has to pass the election threshold of 3% of the overall valid vote to be allocated a seat in the proportional vote. Nepal uses the Sainte-Laguë method to allocate proportional seats.

Voting is limited to Nepali citizens aged 18 or over of sound mind and not having been declared ineligible under federal election fraud and punishment laws.

=== Eligibility to vote ===
To vote in the general election, one must be:

- on the electoral roll
- aged 18 or over on 19 December 2022
- a citizen of Nepal
- of sound mind
- not ineligible as per federal election fraud and punishment laws

== Pre-election arrangement ==
Party	Ideology	2017 result			Seats at dissolution
Party	Ideology	Votes (%)		Seats	Seats at dissolution
CPN (Unified Marxist–Leninist)	Marxism–Leninism; People's Multiparty Democracy	30.68		121 / 275	94 / 275
Nepali Congress	Social democracy Democratic socialism	35.75		63 / 275	63 / 275
CPN (Maoist Centre)	Marxism–Leninism–Maoism–Prachanda Path	13.66		53 / 275	49 / 275
CPN (Unified Socialist)	Marxism–Leninism; People's Multiparty Democracy	New party			25 / 275
People's Socialist Party, Nepal	Democratic socialism	RJPN	4.95	17 / 275	16 / 275
People's Socialist Party, Nepal	Democratic socialism	FSFN	4.93	16 / 275	16 / 275
People's Socialist Party, Nepal	Democratic socialism	Naya Shakti	0.86	1 / 275	16 / 275
Loktantrik Samajwadi Party, Nepal	Social democracy	New party			13 / 275
Nepal Socialist Party	Democratic socialism	New party			5 / 275
Rastriya Prajatantra Party (Note: Represented as an independent politician in 2017 for not meeting the threshold.)	Constitutional monarchism Economic liberalism Hindu nationalism	RPP	2.06	1 / 275	1 / 275
Rastriya Prajatantra Party	Constitutional monarchism Economic liberalism Hindu nationalism	RPP(D)	0.93	0 / 275	1 / 275
Rastriya Prajatantra Party	Constitutional monarchism Economic liberalism Hindu nationalism	URPP(N)	0.30	0 / 275	1 / 275
People's Progressive Party	Social democracy Agrarianism	New party			1 / 275
Rastriya Janamorcha	Anti-Federalism; Communism; Marxism–Leninism	0.65		1 / 275	1 / 275
Nepal Workers' and Peasants' Party	Marxism–Leninism	0.59		1 / 275	1 / 275
Independent (Note: Joined the CPN (Maoist Centre) but stayed as an independent politician.)	—	—		1 / 275	1 / 275

== Electoral alliances and parties ==
=== Democratic Left Alliance ===
The coalition government of Nepali Congress, CPN (Maoist Centre), CPN (Unified Socialist), People's Socialist Party and Rastriya Janamorcha decided to form an alliance to contest the parliamentary elections on 5 August 2022. Later on August 15, Nepal Socialist Party led by former prime Minister Baburam Bhattarai decided to contest the election under the election symbol and manifesto of CPN (Maoist Centre). On October 9, on the deadline of the candidate nominations, People's Socialist Party broke away from the alliance and the alliance decided to support Loktantrik Samajwadi Party in 7 seats. The alliance also supported Ghanashyam Bhusal in Rupandehi 1 and Prabhu Sah in Rautahat 3 who ran as dissident candidates from CPN (UML) from seats allotted to CPN (Maoist Centre). After the candidacy of Raju Gurung of Unified Socialist was scrapped by the Election Commission, the alliance decided to support Rastriya Janamukti Party candidate Keshav Bahadur Thapa in Rupandehi 2. Rastriya Janamorcha however decided to support the candidate from Nepal Majdoor Kisan Party.

Party		Symbol	Leader	Leader's Seat	Seats contested	Male candidates	Female candidates
1.	Nepali Congress		Sher Bahadur Deuba	Dadeldhura 1	91	86	5
2.	Communist Party of Nepal (Maoist Centre)		Pushpa Kamal Dahal	Gorkha 2	46 (Note: 1 candidate is contesting the election separate from the alliance.)	38	8
3.	Nepal Socialist Party		Baburam Bhattarai	None	46	38	8
4.	Communist Party of Nepal (Unified Socialist)		Madhav Kumar Nepal	Rautahat 1	20	19	1
5.	Loktantrik Samajwadi Party, Nepal		Mahantha Thakur	Mahottari 3	51 (Note: 7 candidates are contesting the election with support from the Five Party Alliance.)	48	3
6.	Rastriya Janamorcha		Chitra Bahadur K.C.	Baglung 1	2	1	1
Total					165	152	13

=== CPN (UML) + People's Socialist Party ===
CPN (UML) decided to support People's Socialist Party in 7 seats on 9 October 2022. The CPN (UML) also decided to support Rastriya Prajtantra Party candidates in Jhapa 5, Rupandehi 1 and Banke 2 and decided to field Rastriya Prajtantra Party Nepal chairman Kamal Thapa in Makwanpur 1 under their election symbol. The party also supported dissident candidate from Nepali Congress, Dinesh Koirala in Chitwan 3, Karna Bahadur Malla of Nepali Congress (B.P.) in Dadeldhura 1 and Hridayesh Tripathi of the People's Progressive Party in Parasi 1.

Party		Symbol	Leader	Leader's Seat	Seats contested	Male candidates	Female candidates
1.	Communist Party of Nepal (Unified Marxist–Leninist)		KP Sharma Oli	Jhapa 5	141	130	11
2.	Nepal Pariwar Dal		Ek Nath Dhakal	Party list	141	130	11
4.	People's Socialist Party, Nepal		Upendra Yadav	Saptari 2	79 (Note: 17 candidates are contesting the election with the support of the CPN (UML) alliance.)	72	7
Total					158	147	11

=== Others ===
Party	Symbol	Leader	Leader's Seat	Seats contested	Male candidates	Female candidates
Rastriya Prajatantra Party		Rajendra Prasad Lingden	Jhapa 3	140	132	8
Rastriya Prajatantra Party Nepal		Kamal Thapa	Makawanpur 1 (Note: Party chairman Kamal Thapa contested the election as a candidate from CPN (UML))[./2022_Nepalese_general_election#cite_note-Kamal-52 [d]]	58	52	6
Rastriya Swatantra Party		Rabi Lamichhane	Chitwan 2	131	119	12
Nepal Workers' and Peasants' Party		Narayan Man Bijukchhe	None	109	97	12
Janamat Party	Janamat Party Election Symbol	C. K. Raut	Saptari 2	54	52	2
Nagarik Unmukti Party		Ranjeeta Shrestha	Kailali 1	30	27	3
People's Progressive Party		Hridayesh Tripathi	Parasi 1	15	14	1
Bibeksheel Sajha Party		Samikchya Baskota	None	7	7	0
Nepal Sushasan Party		Ramesh Prasad Kharel	Kathmandu 1	9	8	1
Nepal Naulo Janbadi Party		Ganga Lal Shrestha	Kavrepalanchok 2	1	1	0
Nepal Aama Party		Rom Lal Giri	Party list	9	6	3
Sachet Nepali Party		Punya Prasad Prasain	Kathmandu 2	7	7	0
Terai Madhesh Loktantrik Party		Brikhesh Chandra Lal	Mahottari 3	2	2	0
Hamro Nepali Party		Anant Raj Ghimire	Party list	62	58	4

=== 2017–2022 MPs contesting under a different political affiliation ===
Outgoing MP	2017 party	2017 constituency	2022 party	2022 constituency
Gauri Shankar Chaudhary	CPN (Maoist Centre)	Kailali 3	CPN (UML)	Kailali 3
Top Bahadur Rayamajhi	CPN (Maoist Centre)	Arghakhanchi 1	CPN (UML)	Arghakhanchi 1
Lekh Raj Bhatta	CPN (Maoist Centre)	Kailali 4	CPN (UML)	Kailali 4
Uma Shankar Agrariya	Federal Socialist Forum	Dhanusha 2	CPN (UML)	Dhanusha 2
Ruhi Naaz	Federal Socialist Forum	Party list	CPN (UML)	Party list
Iqbal Miya	Rastriya Janata Party Nepal	Bara 4	CPN (UML)	Bara 4
Amrita Agrahari	Rastriya Janata Party Nepal	Party list	CPN (UML)	Party list
Chanda Chaudhary	Rastriya Janata Party Nepal	Party list	Nepali Congress	Party list
Renuka Gurung	Federal Socialist Forum	Party list	Rastriya Prajatantra Party	Party list
Parbata DC Chaudhary	Nepali Congress	Party list	Nagrik Unmukti Party	Party list
Hridayesh Tripathi	CPN (UML)	Parasi 1	People's Progressive Party	Parasi 1
Ganga Satgauwa	CPN (UML)	Party list	Hamro Nepali Party	Dang 1
Rambir Manandhar	CPN (UML)	Kathmandu 7	Independent	Kathmandu 7
Ghanashyam Bhusal	CPN (UML)	Rupandehi 3	Independent	Rupandehi 1
Amresh Kumar Singh	Nepali Congress	Sarlahi 4	Independent	Sarlahi 4
Prabhu Sah	CPN (Maoist Centre)	Rautahat 3	Independent	Rautahat 3
Sarita Giri	Federal Socialist Forum	Party list	Independent	Siraha 1

=== 2017–2022 MPs not standing for re-election ===
CPN (UML)

- Bhim Bahadur Rawal
- Khagaraj Adhikari
- Kedar Sigdel
- Pabitra Niraula Kharel
- Jaya Kumar Rai
- Parbat Gurung
- Ganesh Kumar Pahadi
- Krishna Prasad Dahal
- Jagat Bahadur Bishwakarma
- Bhupendra Bahadur Thapa
- Dal Bahadur Rana
- Nanda Lal Rokka Chhetri
- Raj Bahadur Budhathoki
- Nawaraj Rawat
- Lal Bahadur Thapa
- Bhairav Bahadur Singh
- Tham Maya Thapa
- Kumari Tulsi Thapa
- Mohan Baniya
- Radha Kumari Gyawali
- Binda Pandey
- Goma Devkota
- Man Kumari GC
- Mayadevi Neupane
- Bishnu Sharma
- Sarita Neupane
- Maina Kumari Bhandari
- Tirtha Gautam
- Shiva Maya Tumbahangphe
- Sujata Shakya
- Bina Kumari Shrestha
- Nabina Lama
- Shanti Maya Tamang
- Kumari Meche
- Bimala Bishwakarma
- Bimala BK
- Sanu Shiva
- Aasha Kumari BK
- Motilal Dugad
- Sarita Kumari Giri
- Rekha Kumari

Nepali Congress

- Karma Ghale
- Lalkaji Gurung
- Jeep Tshering Lama
- Pramila Rai
- Mahendra Kumari Limbu
- Hira Gurung
- Mina Subba
- Divyamani Rajbhandari
- Satya Narayan Sharma
- Mohan Panday
- Ram Bahadur Bista
- Dila Sangraula
- Meena Pandey
- Uma Regmi
- Rangmati Shahi
- Gyan Kumari Chhantyal
- Namita Kumari Chaudhary
- Smriti Narayan Chaudhary
- Man Bahadur Bishwakarma
- Min Bahadur Bishwakarma
- Prakash Rasaili
- Sujata Pariyar
- Laxmi Pariyar
- Bimala Nepali
- Atahar Kamal Musalman
- Sarbat Aara Khanam
- Minendra Rijal
- Mohammad Aftab Alam

CPN (Maoist Centre)

- Surendra Karki
- Ganga Bahadur Tamang
- Hem Kumar Rai
- Suresh Kumar Rai
- Shyam Kumar Shrestha
- Haribol Gajurel
- Agni Prasad Sapkota
- Hari Raj Adhikari
- Kamala Rokka
- Krishna Bahadur Mahara
- Tek Bahadur Basnet
- Gajendra Bahadur Mahat
- Suresh Chandra Das
- Santa Kumar Tharu
- Jayapuri Gharti
- Sashi Shrestha
- Yashoda Gurung Subedi
- Chudamani Khadka
- Purna Kumari Subedi
- Dharmasheela Chapagain
- Satya Pahadi
- Indu Kumari Sharma
- Ram Kumari Chaudhary
- Durga Kumari Bishwakarma
- Bodhmaya Kumari Yadav
- Dil Kumari Sah
- Chanda Tara Kumari
- Amrita Thapa
- Durga Bahadur Rawat

CPN (Unified Socialist)

- Kalilka Khatun
- Gopal Bahadur Bam
- Bhawani Prasad Khapung
- Hira Chandra KC
- Mukunda Neupane
- Kalyani Kumari Khadka
- Nira Devi Jairu
- Sarala Yadav
- Pushpa Kumari Karna Kayastha
- Samina Hussein
- Parbani Kumari Bishunkhe
- Laxmi Chaudhary
- Bina Budhathoki

People's Socialist Party

- Surya Narayan Yadav
- Hari Narayan Rauniyar
- Rani Mandal
- Lila Devi Sitaula
- Renu Kumari Yadav
- Nar Maya Dhakal

Loktantrik Samajwadi Party

- Bimal Prasad Shrivastav
- Chandra Kant Chaudhary
- Kali Devi Bishwakarma
- Dulari Devi Khatweni
- Nirajala Raut

Nepal Socialist Party

- Baburam Bhattarai

Nagarik Unmukti Party

- Resham Lal Chaudhary

Independent

- Chakka Bahadur Lama

== Surveys and opinion polls ==
Dates conducted	Pollster	Party	Party list		Constituency	Total
16–30 Oct	Annapurna Media Network	Nepali Congress	36	30%	59–63	101–105
16–30 Oct	Annapurna Media Network	CPN (UML)	40	34%	47–52	90–100
16–30 Oct	Annapurna Media Network	Maoist Centre	14	11%	17–21	30–40
16–30 Oct	Annapurna Media Network	RSP	10	9%	1–5	10–15
16–30 Oct	Annapurna Media Network	Unified Socialist	0	<3%	9–13	9–12
16–30 Oct	Annapurna Media Network	PSP-N	5	4%	4–8	8–12
16–30 Oct	Annapurna Media Network	RPP	5	4%	2–6	6–10
16–30 Oct	Annapurna Media Network	LSP-N	0	<3%	1–4	2–4
16–30 Oct	Annapurna Media Network	Janamorcha	0	<3%	1–2	1–2
16–30 Oct	Annapurna Media Network	Majdoor Kisan	0	<3%	1–3	1
16–30 Oct	Annapurna Media Network	Nagrik Unmukti	0	<3%	1–3	1
16–30 Oct	Annapurna Media Network	Independents	0	<3%	5–9	6–10
Sample size	19,858	Total	110		165	275

=== Exit polls ===
Dates conducted	Pollster	Party	Constituency
19 Nov	ABC News	Nepali Congress	61–70
19 Nov	ABC News	CPN (UML)	34–41
19 Nov	ABC News	Maoist Centre	24–31
19 Nov	ABC News	Unified Socialist	7–10
19 Nov	ABC News	PSP-N	5–7
19 Nov	ABC News	RPP	3–5
19 Nov	ABC News	LSP-N	3–4
19 Nov	ABC News	Janamorcha	2
19 Nov	ABC News	Others	10–15
19 Nov	ABC News	Tossup	16
Total			165

== Results ==
Party	Proportional			FPTP			Total seats	+/–
Party	Votes	%	Seats	Votes	%	Seats	Total seats	+/–
Communist Party of Nepal (Unified Marxist–Leninist)	2,845,641	26.95	34	3,233,567	30.83	44	78	–43
Nepali Congress	2,715,225	25.71	32	2,431,907	23.19	57	89	+26
Communist Party of Nepal (Maoist Centre)—Nepal Socialist Party	1,175,684	11.13	14	982,826	9.37	18	32	–21
Rastriya Swatantra Party	1,130,344	10.70	13	815,023	7.77	7	20	New
Rastriya Prajatantra Party	588,849	5.58	7	549,340	5.24	7	14	+13
People's Socialist Party, Nepal	421,314	3.99	5	379,337	3.62	7	12	–22
Janamat Party	394,655	3.74	5	292,554	2.79	1	6	New
Communist Party of Nepal (Unified Socialist)	298,391	2.83	0	436,020	4.16	10	10	New
Nagrik Unmukti Party	271,722	2.57	0	172,205	1.64	3	3	New
Loktantrik Samajwadi Party, Nepal	167,367	1.58	0	169,692	1.62	4	4	New
Nepal Workers Peasants Party	75,168	0.71	0	71,567	0.68	1	1	0
Hamro Nepali Party	55,743	0.53	0	57,077	0.54	0	0	New
Mongol National Organisation	49,000	0.46	0	42,892	0.41	0	0	0
Rastriya Janamorcha	46,504	0.44	0	57,278	0.55	1	1	0
Nepal Federal Socialist Party	41,830	0.40	0	7,172	0.07	0	0	0
Communist Party of Nepal (Marxist–Leninist)	30,599	0.29	0	18,716	0.18	0	0	0
Rastriya Janamukti Party	23,934	0.23	0	34,012	0.32	0	0	0
People's Progressive Party	18,059	0.17	0	37,511	0.36	0	0	New
Nepal Naulo Janwadi Party―Nepal Aama Party―Nepal Sushashan Party―Sachet Nepali Party	17,902	0.17	0	18,495	0.18	0	0	New
Sanghiya Loktantrik Rastriya Manch	17,805	0.17	0	11,488	0.11	0	0	0
Bahujan Ekata Party Nepal	17,080	0.16	0	7,274	0.07	0	0	New
Nepali Congress (B.P.)	12,502	0.12	0	13,123	0.13	0	0	0
Rastriya Prajatantra Party Nepal	12,340	0.12	0	10,087	0.10	0	0	New
Nepali Janata Dal	10,137	0.10	0	1,654	0.02	0	0	0
Bahujan Shakti Party	9,435	0.09	0	6,710	0.06	0	0	0
Nepalka Lagi Nepali Party	8,436	0.08	0	3,893	0.04	0	0	New
Nepal Communist Party	8,013	0.08	0	313	0.00	0	0	New
Nepal Loktantrik Party	7,705	0.07	0	3,842	0.04	0	0	New
Nepal Janata Party	7,518	0.07	0	2,269	0.02	0	0	New
Communist Party of Nepal Marxist (Pushpa Lal)	7,402	0.07	0	1,760	0.02	0	0	New
Miteri Party Nepal	7,043	0.07	0	22	0.00	0	0	New
Janajagaran Party Nepal	6,550	0.06	0	324	0.00	0	0	New
Aamul Pariwartan Masiha Party Nepal	6,429	0.06	0	1,366	0.01	0	0	0
Terai Madhesh Loktantrik Party	5,977	0.06	0	12,203	0.12	0	0	New
Janasamajbadi Party	5,925	0.06	0	3,030	0.03	0	0	0
Nepal Dalit Party―Samajik Ekata Party―Communist Party of Nepal (Socialist)	5,839	0.06	0	478	0.00	0	0	New
Pichhadibarga Nishad Dalit Janajati Party	5,105	0.05	0	379	0.00	0	0	New
Bibeksheel Sajha Party	4,049	0.04	0	2,446	0.02	0	0	0
Ekikrit Shakti Nepal	3,792	0.04	0	3,026	0.03	0	0	New
Communist Party of Nepal (Maoist Socialist)	3,702	0.04	0	766	0.01	0	0	New
Sanghiya Loktantrik Rastriya Manch (Tharuhat)	3,406	0.03	0	293	0.00	0	0	0
Rastriya Mukti Andolan Nepal	3,354	0.03	0			0	0	0
Maulik Jarokilo Party	3,256	0.03	0	2,416	0.02	0	0	New
Nepal Samabeshi Party	2,963	0.03	0			0	0	0
Communist Party of Nepal (Paribartan)	2,220	0.02	0	364	0.00	0	0	New
Rastriya Nagarik Party	2,150	0.02	0	149	0.00	0	0	0
Nationalist People's Party	2,018	0.02	0	1,768	0.02	0	0	New
Sajha Party Nepal				2,327	0.02	0	0	New
Nepal Sadbhawana Party				660	0.01	0	0	New
Nepal Bibeksheel Party				379	0.00	0	0	New
Aitihasik Prajatantrik Janata Party Nepal				359	0.00	0	0	New
Kirat Khambhuwan Sajha Party				278	0.00	0	0	New
Khambuwan Rastriya Morcha Nepal				162	0.00	0	0	New
Punarjagarn Party Nepal				141	0.00	0	0	New
Nepalbad				131	0.00	0	0	0
Tamangsaling Loktantrik Party				85	0.00	0	0	0
Gandhibadi Party Nepal				60	0.00	0	–	New
Rastriya Samajwadi Party Nepal				60	0.00	0	0	0
Samajik Loktantrik Party				56	0.00	0	0	New
Independents				584,629	5.57	5	5	+4
Total	10,560,082	100.00	110	10,487,961	100.00	165	275	0
Valid votes	10,560,082	94.91		10,487,961	94.94			
Invalid/blank votes	566,144	5.09		559,076	5.06			
Total votes	11,126,226	100.00		11,047,037	100.00			
Registered voters/turnout	17,988,570	61.85		17,988,570	61.41			
Source: Election Commission Nepal ;

=== Results by constituency ===
Constituency	Elected MP	Party
Achham 1	Sher Bahadur Kunwor	Unified Socialist
Achham 2	Pushpa Bahadur Shah	Congress
Arghakhanchi 1	Top Bahadur Rayamajhi	CPN (UML)
Baglung 1	Chitra Bahadur K.C.	Janamorcha
Baglung 2	Devendra Paudel	Maoist Centre
Baitadi 1	Damodar Bhandari	CPN (UML)
Bajhang 1	Bhanu Bhakta Joshi	Unified Socialist
Bajura 1	Badri Prasad Pandey	Congress
Banke 1	Surya Prasad Dhakal	CPN (UML)
Banke 2	Dhawal Shamsher Rana	RPP
Banke 3	Kishore Singh Rathore	Congress
Bara 1	Achyut Prasad Mainali	CPN (UML)
Bara 2	Ram Sahaya Yadav	PSP-Nepal
Bara 3	Jwala Kumari Sah	CPN (UML)
Bara 4	Krishna Kumar Shrestha	Unified Socialist
Bardiya 1	Sanjay Kumar Gautam	Congress
Bardiya 2	Lalbir Chaudhary	Independent
Bhaktapur 1	Prem Suwal	NMKP
Bhaktapur 2	Durlabh Thapa Chhetri	Congress
Bhojpur 1	Sudan Kirati	Maoist Centre
Chitwan 1	Hari Dhakal	RSP
Chitwan 2	Rabi Lamichhane	RSP
Chitwan 3	Bikram Pandey	RPP
Dadeldhura 1	Sher Bahadur Deuba	Congress
Dailekh 1	Amar Bahadur Thapa	Unified Socialist
Dailekh 2	Dikpal Kumar Shahi	Congress
Dang 1	Metmani Chaudhary	Unified Socialist
Dang 2	Rekha Sharma	Maoist Centre
Dang 3	Deepak Giri	Congress
Darchula 1	Dilendra Prasad Badu	Congress
Dhading 1	Rajendra Prasad Pandey	Unified Socialist
Dhading 2	Ram Nath Adhikari	Congress
Dhankuta 1	Rajendra Kumar Rai	CPN (UML)
Dhanusha 1	Dipak Karki	PSP-Nepal
Dhanusha 2	Ram Krishna Yadav	Congress
Dhanusha 3	Julie Kumari Mahato	CPN (UML)
Dhanusha 4	Raghubir Mahaseth	CPN (UML)
Dolakha 1	Ganga Karki	Maoist Centre
Dolpa 1	Dhan Bahadur Buda	Unified Socialist
Doti 1	Prem Bahadur Ale	Unified Socialist
Gorkha 1	Rajendra Bajgain	Congress
Gorkha 2	Pushpa Kamal Dahal	Maoist Centre
Gulmi 1	Chandra Kant Bhandari	Congress
Gulmi 2	Gokarna Raj Bista	CPN (UML)
Humla 1	Tsering Damdul Lama	Maoist Centre
Ilam 1	Mahesh Basnet	CPN (UML)
Ilam 2	Subas Chandra Nemwang	CPN (UML)
Jajarkot 1	Shakti Bahadur Basnet	Maoist Centre
Jhapa 1	Bishwa Prakash Sharma	Congress
Jhapa 2	Dev Raj Ghimire	CPN (UML)
Jhapa 3	Rajendra Lingden	RPP
Jhapa 4	Lal Prasad Sawa Limbu	CPN (UML)
Jhapa 5	KP Sharma Oli	CPN (UML)
Jumla 1	Gyan Bahadur Shahi	RPP
Kailali 1	Ranjeeta Shrestha	Nagrik Unmukti
Kailali 2	Arun Kumar Chaudhary	Nagrik Unmukti
Kailali 3	Ganga Ram Chaudhary	Nagrik Unmukti
Kailali 4	Bir Bahadur Balayar	Congress
Kailali 5	Dilli Raj Pant	Congress
Kalikot 1	Mahendra Bahadur Shahi	Maoist Centre
Kanchanpur 1	Tara Lama Tamang	CPN (UML)
Kanchanpur 2	Narayan Prakash Saud	Congress
Kanchanpur 3	Ramesh Lekhak	Congress
Kapilvastu 1	Balaram Adhikari	CPN (UML)
Kapilvastu 2	Surendra Raj Acharya	Congress
Kapilvastu 3	Mangal Prasad Gupta	CPN (UML)
Kaski 1	Man Bahadur Gurung	CPN (UML)
Kaski 2	Bidya Bhattarai	CPN (UML)
Kaski 3	Damodar Poudel Bairagi	CPN (UML)
Kathmandu 1	Prakash Man Singh	Congress
Kathmandu 2	Sobita Gautam	RSP
Kathmandu 3	Santosh Chalise	Congress
Kathmandu 4	Gagan Thapa	Congress
Kathmandu 5	Pradip Paudel	Congress
Kathmandu 6	Shishir Khanal	RSP
Kathmandu 7	Ganesh Parajuli	RSP
Kathmandu 8	Biraj Bhakta Shrestha	RSP
Kathmandu 9	Krishna Gopal Shrestha	CPN (UML)
Kathmandu 10	Rajendra Kumar K.C.	Congress
Kavrepalanchok 1	Surya Man Dong	Maoist Centre
Kavrepalanchok 2	Gokul Prasad Baskota	CPN (UML)
Khotang 1	Ram Kumar Rai	Maoist Centre
Lalitpur 1	Udaya Shamsher Rana	Congress
Lalitpur 2	Prem Bahadur Maharjan	CPN (UML)
Lalitpur 3	Toshima Karki	RSP
Lamjung 1	Prithivi Subba Gurung	CPN (UML)
Mahottari 1	Laxmi Mahato Koiri	CPN (UML)
Mahottari 2	Sharat Singh Bhandari	Loktantrik Samajwadi
Mahottari 3	Mahantha Thakur	Loktantrik Samajwadi
Mahottari 4	Mahendra Kumar Ray	Congress
Makwanpur 1	Deepak Bahadur Singh	RPP
Makwanpur 2	Mahesh Kumar Bartaula	CPN (UML)
Manang 1	Tek Bahadur Gurung	Congress
Morang 1	Dig Bahadur Limbu	Congress
Morang 2	Rishikesh Pokharel	CPN (UML)
Morang 3	Sunil Kumar Sharma	Congress
Morang 4	Aman Lal Modi	Maoist Centre
Morang 5	Yogendra Mandal	Independent
Morang 6	Shekhar Koirala	Congress
Mugu 1	Aain Bahadur Shahi Thakuri	Congress
Mustang 1	Yogesh Gauchan Thakali	Congress
Myagdi 1	Kham Bahadur Garbuja	Congress
Nawalpur 1	Shashanka Koirala	Congress
Nawalpur 2	Bishnu Kumar Karki	Congress
Nuwakot 1	Hit Bahadur Tamang	Maoist Centre
Nuwakot 2	Arjun Narsingh K.C.	Congress
Okhaldhunga 1	Ram Hari Khatiwada	Congress
Palpa 1	Narayan Prasad Acharya	CPN (UML)
Palpa 2	Thakur Prasad Gaire	CPN (UML)
Panchthar 1	Basanta Kumar Nemwang	CPN (UML)
Parasi 1	Binod Chaudhary	Congress
Parasi 2	Dhruba Bahadur Pradhan	RPP
Parbat 1	Padam Giri	CPN (UML)
Parsa 1	Pradeep Yadav	PSP-Nepal
Parsa 2	Ajay Kumar Chaurasiya	Congress
Parsa 3	Raj Kumar Gupta	CPN (UML)
Parsa 4	Ramesh Rijal	Congress
Pyuthan 1	Surya Bahadur Thapa Chhetri	CPN (UML)
Ramechhap 1	Purna Bahadur Tamang	Congress
Rasuwa 1	Mohan Acharya	Congress
Rautahat 1	Madhav Kumar Nepal	Unified Socialist
Rautahat 2	Kiran Kumar Sah	Independent
Rautahat 3	Prabhu Sah	Independent
Rautahat 4	Dev Prasad Timilsena	Congress
Rolpa 1	Barsaman Pun	Maoist Centre
Eastern Rukum 1	Purna Bahadur Gharti Magar	Maoist Centre
Western Rukum 1	Janardan Sharma	Maoist Centre
Rupandehi 1	Chhabilal Bishwakarma	CPN (UML)
Rupandehi 2	Bishnu Prasad Paudel	CPN (UML)
Rupandehi 3	Deepak Bohara	RPP
Rupandehi 4	Sarbendra Nath Shukla	Loktantrik Samajwadi
Rupandehi 5	Basudev Ghimire	CPN (UML)
Salyan 1	Prakash Jwala	Unified Socialist
Sankhuwasabha 1	Deepak Khadka	Congress
Saptari 1	Nawal Kishore Sah Sudi	PSP-Nepal
Saptari 2	CK Raut	Janamat
Saptari 3	Dinesh Kumar Yadav	Congress
Saptari 4	Teju Lal Chaudhary	Congress
Sarlahi 1	Ram Prakash Chaudhary	Loktantrik Samajwadi
Sarlahi 2	Mahindra Rai Yadav	Maoist Centre
Sarlahi 3	Hari Prasad Upreti	CPN (UML)
Sarlahi 4	Amresh Kumar Singh	Independent
Sindhuli 1	Shyam Kumar Ghimire	Congress
Sindhuli 2	Lekh Nath Dahal	Maoist Centre
Sindhupalchok 1	Madhav Sapkota	Maoist Centre
Sindhupalchok 2	Mohan Bahadur Basnet	Congress
Siraha 1	Ram Shankar Yadav	CPN (UML)
Siraha 2	Raj Kishor Yadav	PSP-Nepal
Siraha 3	Lila Nath Shrestha	CPN (UML)
Siraha 4	Birendra Prasad Mahato	PSP-Nepal
Solukhumbu 1	Manbir Rai	CPN (UML)
Sunsari 1	Ashok Rai	PSP-Nepal
Sunsari 2	Bhim Prasad Acharya	CPN (UML)
Sunsari 3	Bhagwati Chaudhary	CPN (UML)
Sunsari 4	Gyanendra Bahadur Karki	Congress
Surkhet 1	Purna Bahadur Khadka	Congress
Surkhet 2	Hridaya Ram Thani	Congress
Syangja 1	Raju Thapa	Congress
Syangja 2	Dhanraj Gurung	Congress
Tanahun 1	Ram Chandra Paudel	Congress
Tanahun 2	Shankar Bhandari	Congress
Taplejung 1	Yogesh Bhattrai	CPN (UML)
Tehrathum 1	Sita Gurung	Congress
Udayapur 1	Narayan Khadka	Congress
Udayapur 2	Ambar Bahadur Rayamajhi	CPN (UML)

=== Results by province ===
==== Party list ====
Province	Party list vote share										
Province	UML	NC	MC	RSP	RPP	PSP-N	JP	US	NUP	LSP	Others
Province 1	32.90	28.45	9.67	11.01	6.68	2.73	0.96	2.37	0.58	0.31	4.34
Madhesh	17.49	20.46	8.46	3.43	3.23	14.05	13.95	5.04	1.93	5.15	6.81
Bagmati	26.39	23.24	13.03	18.72	8.81	0.37	0.21	2.49	0.13	0.10	6.51
Gandaki	32.00	30.80	10.68	17.44	3.82	0.27	0.19	0.94	0.16	0.03	3.67
Lumbini	26.82	24.69	9.51	11.36	5.85	2.87	3.71	1.38	5.97	2.39	5.45
Karnali	31.20	30.82	23.08	3.44	3.28	0.24	0.07	4.35	0.04	0.10	3.38
Sudurpashchim	29.42	30.83	12.53	4.94	4.32	0.22	0.10	3.57	10.91	0.29	2.87

==== Constituency ====
Province	Total seats	Seats won												
Province	Total seats	NC	UML	MC	US	RSP	RPP	PSP-N	LSP	NUP	JP	NWPP	RJM	Ind
Province 1	28	9	13	3			1	1						1
Madhesh	32	8	9		2			6	3		1			3
Bagmati	33	13	4	5	1	7	2					1		
Gandaki	18	10	5	2									1	
Lumbini	26	5	11	4	1		3		1					1
Karnali	12	4		4	3		1							
Sudurpashchim	16	8	2		3					3				
Total	165	57	44	18	10	7	7	7	4	3	1	1	1	5

=== Notable losses ===
==== Former prime minister to lose in the election ====
- Jhala Nath Khanal – Ilam 1 (CPN (Unified Socialist))

==== Outgoing cabinet ministers to lose in the election ====
- Bal Krishna Khand – Rupandehi 3 (Nepali Congress)
- Pampha Bhusal – Lalitpur 3 (CPN (Maoist Centre))
- Umakant Chaudhary – Bara 1 (Nepali Congress)
- Maheshwar Jung Gahatraj – Banke 1 (CPN (Maoist Centre))
- Jeevan Ram Shrestha – Kathmandu 8 (CPN (Unified Socialist))

==== Outgoing ministers of state to lose in the election ====
- Umesh Shrestha – Chitwan 2 (Nepali Congress)

===== Former chief ministers to lose in the election =====
- Sherdhan Rai – Bhojpur 1 (CPN (UML))
- Shankar Pokharel – Dang 2 (CPN (UML))

=== Seats that changed hands ===
From CPN (UML) to Congress (32)

- Achham 2
- Bajura 1
- Banke 3
- Bhaktapur 2
- Dailekh 2
- Darchula 1
- Dhading 2
- Gulmi 1
- Kailali 5
- Kanchanpur 2
- Kanchanpur 3
- Kapilvastu 2
- Kathmandu 3
- Kathmandu 5
- Lalitpur 1
- Manang 1
- Morang 1
- Morang 3
- Morang 6
- Mustang 1
- Myagdi 1
- Nawalpur 2
- Nuwakot 2
- Okhaldhunga 1
- Parasi 1
- Sankhuwasabha 1
- Sindhuli 1
- Surkhet 1
- Surkhet 2
- Syangja 1
- Syangja 2
- Tanahun 2

From Maoist Centre to CPN (UML) (9)

- Arghakhanchi 1
- Banke 1
- Kanchanpur 1
- Kapilvastu 1
- Lamjung 1
- Mahottari 1
- Sarlahi 3
- Solukhumbu 1
- Udayapur 2

From Congress to CPN (UML) (7)

- Bara 1
- Kapilvastu 3
- Morang 2
- Rupandehi 5
- Siraha 1
- Sunsari 2
- Sunsari 3

From Maoist Centre to Congress (5)

- Gorkha 1 (Note: Seat was part of seat sharing agreement between the Democratic Left Alliance)
- Jhapa 1
- Kailali 4
- Ramechhap 1
- Sindhupalchok 2

From Unified Socialist to CPN (UML) (4)

- Ilam 1
- Lalitpur 2
- Makwanpur 2
- Palpa 2

From LSP-N to Congress (4)

- Dhanusha 2
- Parsa 2
- Parsa 4
- Saptari 3

From Unified Socialist to Congress (4)

- Dang 3
- Mugu 1
- Tanahun 1
- Tehrathum 1

From CPN (UML) to Unified Socialist (4)

- Achham 1
- Bajhang 1
- Dailekh 1
- Dhading 1

From Maoist Centre to Independent (3)

- Bardiya 2
- Morang 5
- Rautahat 3

From CPN (UML) to Swatantra (3)

- Chitwan 1
- Chitwan 2
- Kathmandu 7

From PSP-N To CPN (UML) (2)

- Bara 3
- Parsa 3 (Note: Seat was part of seat sharing agreement between the CPN (UML) and PSP-N)

From Congress to Independent (2)

- Rautahat 2
- Sarlahi 4

From Nepal Socialist Party to Maoist Centre (2)

- Gorkha 2
- Sarlahi 2

From Maoist Centre to PSP-N (2)

- Dhanusha 1
- Siraha 2

From Maoist Centre to RPP (2)

- Chitwan 3
- Jumla 1

From CPN (UML) to Maoist Centre (2)

- Dolakha 1
- Khotang 1

From CPN (UML) to RPP (2)

- Makwanpur 1
- Rupandehi 3 (Note: Seat was part of seat sharing agreement between CPN (UML) and RPP)

From Unified Socialist to Swatantra (2)

- Kathmandu 2
- Kathmandu 8

From LSP-N to Unified Socialist (2)

- Bara 4
- Rautahat 3

From PSP-N to Congress (1)

- Mahottari 4

From Janamorcha to CPN (UML) (1)

- Pyuthan 1

From LSP-N to CPN (UML) (1)

- Dhanusha 3

From PSP-N to Janamat (1)

- Saptari 2

From CPN (UML) to Janamorcha (1)

- Baglung 1

From Congress to LSP-N (1)

- Rupandehi 4

From Independent to Maoist Centre (1)

- Humla 1

From CPN (UML) to Nagrik Unmukti (1)

- Kailali 2

From Maoist Centre to Nagrik Unmukti (1)

- Kailali 3

From RJP-N to Nagrik Unmukti (1)

- Kailali 1

From CPN (UML) to PSP-N (1)

- Sunsari 1

From Congress to RPP (1)

- Parasi 2

From PSP-N to RPP (1)

- Banke 2

From Congress to Swatantra (1)

- Kathmandu 6

From Maoist Centre to Swatantra (1)

- Lalitpur 3

From Maoist Centre to Unified Socialist (1)

- Salyan 1

== Analysis and aftermath ==
There were 12 political parties that were represented at the House of Representatives following the election. Only seven parties met the three percent threshold set in proportional voting to become national parties.

Nepali Congress emerged as the largest party after the elections winning 89 seats. The Democratic Left Alliance won 136 seats at the election but failed to get a majority by two seats. The alliance were in talks with Janamat Party and Nagrik Unmukti Party in order to gain a majority in the House of Representatives.

CPN (UML) won 78 seats at the election and was the second largest party in the House of Representatives. The party however got the most votes in the party list proportional system.

President Bidya Devi Bhandari called on the parties to form a government on 19 December 2022, after the final results of the election were presented to her by the Election Commission. Pashupati Shumsher Jung Bahadur Rana from the Rastriya Prajatantra Party, as the senior-most member of the new House of Representatives, was sworn in on 21 December 2022 by the president. He administered the oath of office to the newly elected members of the House of Representatives on 22 December 2022.

After power sharing talks between the Democratic Alliance broke down on 25 December 2022, CPN (Maoist Centre) chairman Pushpa Kamal Dahal presented his claim for the post of prime minister with the support of CPN (UML), Rastriya Swatantra Party, Rastriya Prajatantra Party, People's Socialist Party, Janamat Party, Nagrik Unmukti Party and three independents. Dahal was sworn in as prime minister for the third time the next day with an eight-member cabinet consisting of MPs from his party, CPN (UML), Rastriya Swatantra Party and Janamat Party, with the confidence and supply of RPP, PSP, NUP and three independents.

The inaugural session was scheduled for 9 January 2023. Dahal secured a vote of confidence on 10 January 2023 with 268 votes in his favor and only two MPs from Nepal Majdoor Kisan Party and Rastriya Janamorcha voting against him.

The CPN (UML) withdrew from the coalition on 27 February 2023, citing Dahal's decision to back an opposition candidate supported by the Nepali Congress in the upcoming presidential election. Dahal had announced this in order to gain the support of NC in the legislature. A vote of confidence is due within 30 days of the loss of a legislative majority. The Rastriya Prajatantra Party had withdrawn support days prior due to the same issue. The Rastriya Swatantra Party had also previously withdrawn its ministers from the government, although remained supportive under a confidence-and-supply agreement.

== See also ==
- 2022 Nepalese National Assembly election
- 2022 Nepalese provincial elections
- 2022 Nepalese local elections
- 2021 split in Nepalese communist parties
- 2021 split in the People's Socialist Party, Nepal
- 2022 Madhesh Provincial Assembly election
