= Ministry of Women, Children and Senior Citizens =

Government ministry of Nepal

Ministry of Women, Children, Gender and Sexual Minorities, and Social Security
- महिला, बालबालिका, लैङ्गिक तथा यौनिक अल्पसङ्ख्यक र सामाजिक सुरक्षा मन्त्रालय
- Emblem of Nepal

Agency overview
- Dissolved: 13 May 2026
- Superseding agency: Ministry of Women, Children, Gender and Sexual Minorities and Social Security
- Jurisdiction: Government of Nepal
- Headquarters: Singha Durbar, Kathmandu, Nepal
- Minister responsible: Sita Badi (last holder)
- Agency executive: Laxmi Kumari Basnet (last holder), Secretary
- Website: mowcsc.gov.np

The Ministry of Women, Children and Senior Citizens (Nepali: महिला, बालबालिका तथा जेष्ठ नागरिक मन्त्रालय) was a governmental body of Nepal. Its mission was to empower women, children and senior citizens, especially those who are economically disadvantaged, socially deprived or otherwise under-served.

The ministry was dissolved to form new Ministry of Women, Children, Gender and Sexual Minorities and Social Security as a part of administrative restructuring by Balendra Shah-led government under Nepal Government (Work Division) Regulations, 2083 on 13 May 2026.

== Organisational structure ==
The Ministry of Women, Children and Senior Citizens have several departments, and subdivisions to facilitate and implement its work:

- The Department of Women and Children
- The Central Child Welfare Board
- The Social Welfare Council
