= 2021 split in Nepalese communist parties =

Split in the Nepal Communist Party

Split in the Nepal Communist Parties
- Date: August 2019 – September 2021
- Location: Nepal
- Caused by: Differences on leadership, power sharing, and ideologies

Parties
CPN (UML)	CPN (MC)	Others

Lead figures
• KP Sharma Oli • Ishwar Pokhrel • Bishnu Prasad Paudel • Shankar Pokhrel • Ram Bahadur Thapa	• Pushpa Kamal Dahal • Narayan Kaji Shrestha • Haribol Gajurel	CPN (Unified Socialist) • Madhav Kumar Nepal • Jhala Nath Khanal • Ram Kumari Jhakri; People's Progressive Party • Hridayesh Tripathi • Brijesh Kumar Gupta • Ishwar Dayal Mishra; NCP Unity Campaign • Bam Dev Gautam • Hari Parajuli

At the end of 2020, a major split in the Nepal Communist Party (NCP) revived the Communist Party of Nepal (Unified Marxist–Leninist) (CPN (UML)) and the Communist Party of Nepal (Maoist Centre) (CPN (MC)).

A further split occurred within the CPN (Maoist Centre) when a group led by Ram Bahadur Thapa (Badal) joined CPN (UML). Similarly, a group led by former prime minister Madhav Kumar Nepal and Jhala Nath Khanal split from CPN (UML) to form CPN (Unified Socialist).

In December 2021, a small group led by Hridayesh Tripathi left CPN (UML) to form the People's Progressive Party. Another group led by Senior Vice-president Bam Dev Gautam left CPN (UML) in September 2021 and was preparing to form a new party as of February 2022.

== Split in Nepal Communist Party ==
=== Internal conflict ===
During a party secretariat meeting on 21 August 2019, senior leader Madhav Kumar Nepal issued a note of dissent regarding the divided party and criticized the two co-chairmen: KP Sharma Oli, the then prime minister, and Pushpa Kamal Dahal. Nepal's grievances with the party leadership included their inability to expediently complete the merger between the former CPN (UML) and CPN (Maoist Centre), the two parties that had combined to form the NCP. He also criticized Oli for not following the "One Leader, One Position" policy that the party had campaigned on and called for Oli to either resign as party leader or as prime minister. Another meeting took place on 21 November 2019, when the party decided on moving forward with two party leaders, with Dahal holding the position of executive head of the party. The meeting also resulted in an agreement to allow Oli to complete his full term as prime minister.

Another disagreement arose when factions in the party did not favor a grant that the government had previously negotiated with the United States under the Millennium Challenge Corporation. The issue was resolved after a task force formed by the party decided to not endorse the proposed agreement as is.

Criticism by party members led Prime Minister Oli to reshuffle his cabinet in November 2019.

In February 2020, Bam Dev Gautam was appointed as the party's vice-chairman after the party's central committee amended the party statute. Party co-chairman Pushpa Kamal Dahal and Madhav Kumar Nepal criticized the Oli government's handling of the COVID-19 pandemic, and leaders within the party urged senior leadership to call a meeting of the secretariat to discuss the government's work. At the meeting of the secretariat, some leaders called on Oli's resignation, but a later meeting decided to allow Oli to stay on after he agreed to work under the party's instructions and let Dahal perform his duties as the party's executive leader.

In August 2020, a panel tasked to resolve the party's internal dispute proposed that a national convention be held in April 2021 regarding party unity, a recommendation which was endorsed by the party's standing committee.

Another cabinet reshuffle was done on 16 October 2020, and Oli was criticized by the party for not consulting them.

On 14 November 2020, co-chairman Pushpa Kamal Dahal presented a political document at a party secretariat meeting that accused KP Sharma Oli of not following the party's directions, unilaterally leading the government and turning a blind eye towards corruption. In response, Oli attacked Dahal for not letting him run the government, promoting factionalism and nepotism, as well as preventing victims of the Nepalese Civil War from getting justice.

=== Vertical split in NCP ===
On 20 December 2020, KP Sharma Oli called on President Bidhya Devi Bhandari to dissolve the House of Representatives and call for fresh elections. In an address to the nation, Oli claimed that he dissolved the house because the party had not let him function as prime minister, and that a no-confidence motion was being prepared against him from within the party. The decision was met with criticism within the party, and seven ministers close to the Dahal–Nepal faction in his cabinet resigned in protest.

In December 2020, Oli called a meeting of central committee leaders close to him and added 556 new members to the existing 446-member central committee body. The new central committee was to organize a party unity convention in November 2021. The meeting also removed Narayan Kaji Shrestha as party spokesperson and replaced him with Pradeep Gyawali.

At the same time as Oli expanded the central committee with his allies, the Dahal–Nepal faction of the party also organized its own central committee meeting with 310 members of the original central committee and replaced Oli as party co-chairman with Madhav Kumar Nepal. The meeting also decided to protest against the government to restore the House of Representatives.

=== Election Commission registry ===
After the merger of the CPN (UML) and CPN (Maoist Centre), the NCP registered with the Election Commission of Nepal on 7 June 2018 under the name "Nepal Communist Party (NCP)". While the nascent party attempted to register under "Nepal Communist Party", the Election Commission of Nepal had refused their application since there was already a party with that name, the Nepal Communist Party, a small group led by Rishi Kattel. To get around the issue, the NCP added "(NCP)" to the end of its name, which lead the party to become colloquially known as the "NCP Double".

Following the split between the Oli and Dahal–Nepal factions, the Election Commission declined to recognize either faction as the legitimate holders of the NCP's registration. On 8 March 2021, Nepal's Supreme Court stated that the allocation of the name "Nepal Communist Party" upon the merger of the CPN (UML) and CPN (Maoist Centre), and by extension the merger itself, was void ab initio, as the name was already allotted to the party led by Kattel, and that the NCP stood "dismissed". Upon the ruling, the CPN (UML) and CPN (Maoist Centre) were revived in their state prior to the merger, although they could merge again if they wanted and followed procedure.

== Split in Communist Party of Nepal (Maoist Centre) ==
Splits in the Communist Party of Nepal (Maoist Centre)
- Date: March 2021
- Location: Nepal
- Caused by: Differences on: leadership; power sharing; ideologies

Parties
CPN (UML)	CPN (Maoist Centre)

Lead figures
• Ram Bahadur Thapa • Top Bahadur Rayamajhi • Lekh Raj Bhatta • Gauri Shankar Chaudhary • Prabhu Sah • Mani Thapa • Dawa Lama Tamang	• Pushpa Kamal Dahal • Narayan Kaji Shrestha • Haribol Gajurel • Barsaman Pun • Janardan Sharma

The CPN (Maoist Centre) party faced a split when the Members of House of Representatives—including Prabhu Sah, Gauri Shankar Chaudhary, Lekhraj Bhatta, former deputy prime minister Top Bahadur Rayamajhi, and two National Assembly members including former Home Minister Ram Bhadur Thapa and Chandra Bahadur Khadka—left the party to join the CPN (UML), along with Maoist leaders Dawa Lama Tamang and Mani Thapa, nine provincial assembly members, four mayors and nine rural municipality chairpersons. Later on, provincial assembly members—including Tanka Angbuhan from Province No. 1, Ram Chandra Mandal, Jwala Kumari Sah, Kundan Prasad Kushwaha, Mohammad Samir from Madhesh Province, Dadhiram Neupane and Dinesh Panthi from Lumbini Province, Dharma Raj Regmi from Karnali Province, and Jhapat Bohara from Sudurpashchim Province—left the party. Similarly, mayors of Rangeli Municipality, Katahariya Municipality, Bideha Municipality, and Maulapur Municipality left to join the CPN (UML).

The former members complained that party president Pushpa Kamal Dahal had stayed chairman for decades since he did not conduct general party conventions, that he was family-centric, and that he made party decisions as a dictator.

== Splits in Communist Party of Nepal (Unified Marxist–Leninist) ==
Splits in the Communist Party of Nepal (Unified Marxist–Leninist)
- Date: August 2021 to September 2021
- Location: Nepal
- Caused by: Differences on: leadership; power sharing; ideologies

Parties
CPN (UML)	CPN (Unified Socialist)	Others

Lead figures
• KP Sharma Oli • Ishwar Pokhrel • Bishnu Prasad Paudel • Shankar Pokhrel • Ram Bahadur Thapa	• Madhav Kumar Nepal • Jhala Nath Khanal • Pradeep Nepal	People's Progressive Party • Hridayesh Tripathi • Brijesh Kumar Gupta • Ishwar Dayal Mishra • Shivajee Yadav; CPN (Unity National Campaign) • Bam Dev Gautam • Tulsa Thapa

=== 2021 vertical split ===
On 18 July 2021, 22 members of the House of Representatives from the CPN (UML) voted for Sher Bahadur Deuba as prime minister, defying the party whip.

As a result, dispute rose among former prime ministers Madhav Kumar Nepal and K. P. Sharma Oli due to Madhav's faction supporting the government despite the party being in the opposition. On 18 August 2021, Madhav Kumar formed a new party called the Communist Party of Nepal (Unified Socialist).

Former prime minister Jhala Nath Khanal, party vice presidents, and as many as 31 members of parliament (MPs) joined the new party. This constituted a split from the top to lower-level committees of the party.

=== 2021 minor splits ===
A minor group led by senior vice president Bam Dev Gautam left the party on 4 September 2021. Currently, they have registered a new party called the Communist Party of Nepal (Unity National Campaign).

Another minor group, led by Hridayesh Tripathi along with MPs Brijesh Kumar Gupta and Ishwar Dayal Mishra also split away on 26 August 2021 and formed the People's Progressive Party.

== Aftermath ==
Governments at the central level and provincial level changed as a result of changes to the legislature. Other factions except CPN (UML) joined with Nepali Congress to stay in power, and Sher Bahadur Deuba was elected as the new prime minister of Nepal.

=== Changes in legislatures ===
Party	Parliament	Seats	Faction	Seats
Nepal Communist Party	National Assembly	49 / 59	CPN (UML)	27 / 59
Nepal Communist Party	National Assembly	49 / 59	CPN (Maoist Centre)	15 / 59
Nepal Communist Party	National Assembly	49 / 59	CPN (Unified Socialist)	7 / 275
Nepal Communist Party	National Assembly	49 / 59	People's Progressive Party	0 / 59
Nepal Communist Party	National Assembly	49 / 59	CPN (Unity National Campaign)	1 / 59
Nepal Communist Party	House of Representatives	174 / 275	CPN (UML)	94 / 275
Nepal Communist Party	House of Representatives	174 / 275	CPN (Maoist Centre)	49 / 275
Nepal Communist Party	House of Representatives	174 / 275	CPN (Unified Socialist)	23 / 275
Nepal Communist Party	House of Representatives	174 / 275	People's Progressive Party	2 / 275
Nepal Communist Party	House of Representatives	174 / 275	CPN (Unity National Campaign)	2 / 275
Nepal Communist Party	Provincial Assembly	349 / 550	CPN (UML)	178 / 550
Nepal Communist Party	Provincial Assembly	349 / 550	CPN (Maoist Centre)	100 / 550
Nepal Communist Party	Provincial Assembly	349 / 550	CPN (Unified Socialist)	54 / 550
Nepal Communist Party	Provincial Assembly	349 / 550	People's Progressive Party	2 / 275
Nepal Communist Party	Provincial Assembly	349 / 550	CPN (Unity National Campaign)	0 / 59

=== Dissolution and reinstatement of parliament ===
President Bidya Devi Bhandari dissolved the House of Representatives per advice of the prime minister KP Sharma Oli on 20 December 2020. Due to internal conflict in the ruling Nepal Communist Party (NCP), Oli recommended the dissolution before a no-confidence motion could be passed. The dissolution was challenged in the Supreme Court of Nepal, which passed a verdict reinstating the House of Representatives on 22 February 2021.

==== Protests ====
On 8–10 January 2021, a two-day strike was held nationwide in protest at the government. A mass rally was held on 20–21 January 2021, when thousands took to the streets to protest the dissolution of parliament. Clashes took place between police and protesters.

On 12 February 2021, Dr. Kedar Narsingh KC led a peaceful protest against Oli's decision to dissolve the House of Representatives, stating that the move was unconstitutional and would derail the development of democracy in the country.

==== Lawsuits ====
13 petitions were filed at the Supreme Court of Nepal challenging the constitutionality of the move. All petitions were heard by the constitutional bench, which includes the Chief Justice and 4 other justices (Anil Kumar Sinha, Bishowambhar Shrestha, Cholendra Shumsher Rana, Sapana Pradhan Malla, and Tej Bahadur KC). More than 300 lawyers participated against or in support of the cabinet decision in the discussion on the constitutional bench. The bench declared the House dissolution unconstitutional on December 20 and called for parliamentary meeting to resume within 13 days.

==== Reactions ====
One faction of the NCP, led by Pushpa Kamal Dahal and Madhav Kumar Nepal, and Nepali Congress, the largest major opposition group, protested against the decision. Pushpa Kamal Dahal, Gagan Thapa, Sher Bahadur Deuba, Bimalendra Nidhi, and other prominent politicians deemed the move unconstitutional. Seven ministers from the Dahal–Nepal faction resigned in protest of the move.

The Dahal–Nepal faction of NCP organized country-wide general protests against the decision on 4 February 2021. Arson and vandalism were reported due to the strike. The protestors have claimed that 77 protestors were detained within the valley. In response to this strike, Oli held a mass assembly on 5 February 2021 in front of Narayanhiti Palace.

India has maintained that this event is Nepal's internal matter. China sent officials in an attempt to make peace between the two splintered factions of the NCP, which was unsuccessful.

== See also ==
- 2021 split in the People's Socialist Party, Nepal
