= Shashwat Dham =

Hindu religious site in Nepal

- शाश्वतधाम
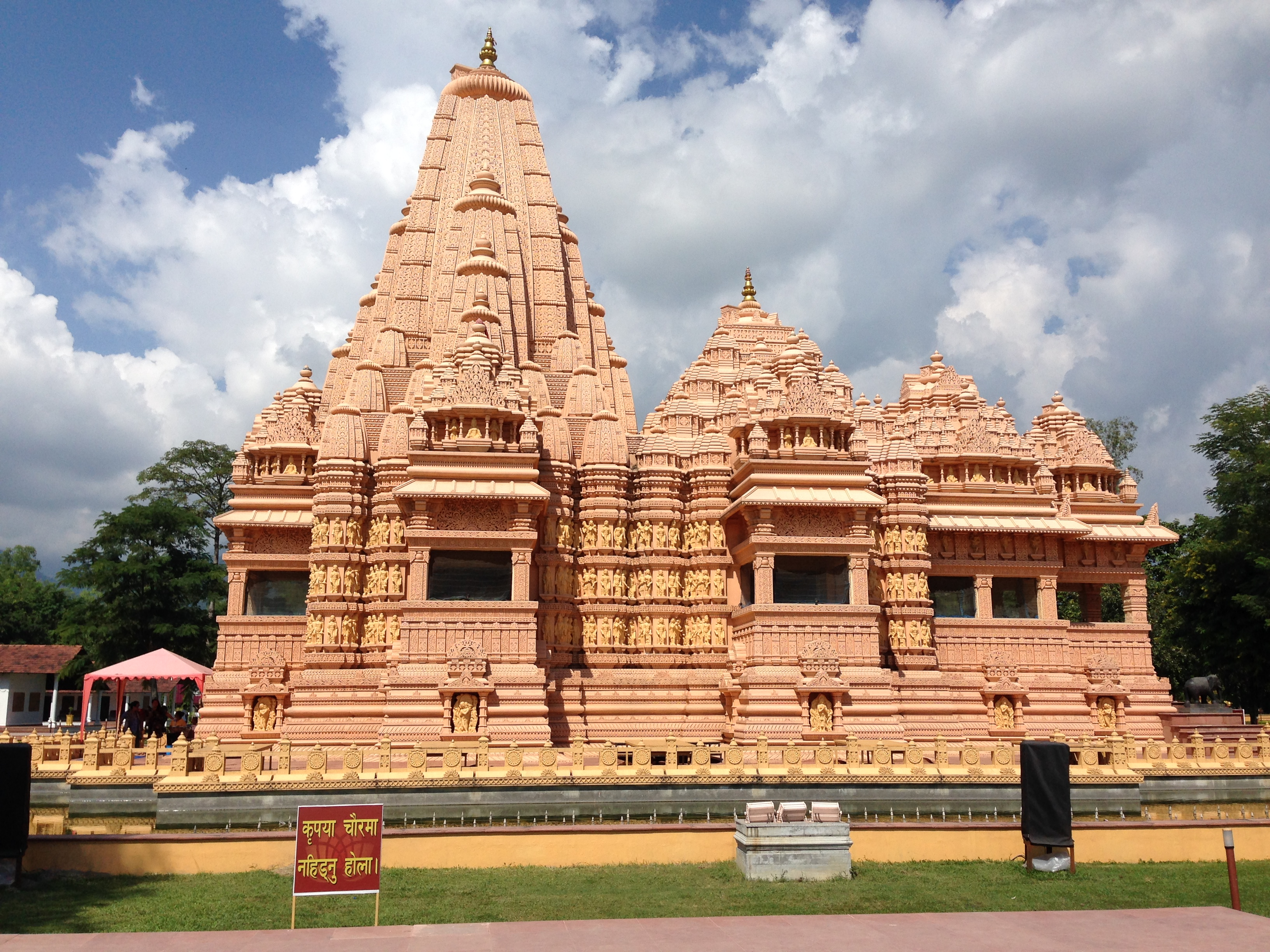
- Shashwat Dham in 2017

- Location within Gandaki Province Location within Nepal

Religion
- Affiliation: Hinduism
- District: Nawalparasi District
- Province: Gandaki Province
- Deity: Lord Shiva

Location
- Location: Devachuli
- Country: Nepal
- Coordinates: 27.677315605919592°N 84.21127421682857°E

Architecture
- Creator: CG Group
- Site area: 12 acres

Website
- http://cgshashwatdham.org/

Shashwat Dham (Nepali: शाश्वतधाम) is a Hindu religious site and tourist destination situated on East West Highway in Devchuli, Nawalpur district, in Nepal. The dham (religious site) consists of a temple of lord Shiva and a Vedic karmakanda gurukul. It has Sri Sri Center for Yoga and Meditation. It was constructed by the CG Group. The temple is spread over 12 acres of land.

== Architecture ==
The main temple is dedicated to Lord Shiva and is known as Ekambareshwor. It is modeled in Khajurao-style of architecture. The temple is surrounded by pond filled with water of various holy shrines from the Indian subcontinent such as Badrinath, Kedarnath, Muktinath and Pashupatinath. The recently build structure includes Sri Sri Center for Yoga, and Vaidik Karmakanda Museum.

== Inauguration ==
The dham was inaugurated by President Bidya Devi Bhandari on March 7, 2017. Kamal Thapa, Bikram Pandey, Indian religious leader Sri Sri Ravi Shankar and Sri Lankan Minister Dayaa Gamagae were also present at the programme.

== See also ==
- Bhaleshwor Mahadev
- Triveni Dham
- Maula Kalika Temple
