= Ishwar Dayal Mishra =

Nepali politician

- ईश्वर दयाल मिश्र

General Secretary of People's Progressive Party
- Incumbent
- Assumed office 2022
- President: Hridayesh Tripathi
- Vice President: Shivajee Yadav
- Preceded by: Position established

Minister of state for Physical Infrastructure
- In office 2011–2013
- President: Ram Baran Yadav
- Prime Minister: Baburam Bhattarai

Member of Nepalese Constituent Assembly
- In office 2008–2017
- Preceded by: Position established
- Succeeded by: Position abolished
- Constituency: Kapilvastu-4

Personal details
- Born: 1972 (age 53–54) Kapilvastu, Nepal
- Party: People's Progressive Party (2022-present)
- Other political affiliations: Terai Madhesh Loktantrik Party (till 2017)

Ishwar Dayal Mishra (Nepali: इश्वरदयाल मिश्र) is a Nepalese politician, a member of People's Progressive Party and the general secretary of the party. He was born in 1972 in Kapilvastu Kushahwa, Maharajganj.

In the 2008 Constituent Assembly election he was elected to represent Kapilvastu 4 receiving 10,394 votes.
