= Chandragiri Cable Car =

Gondola lift transportation system in Nepal

- Chandragiri Hills
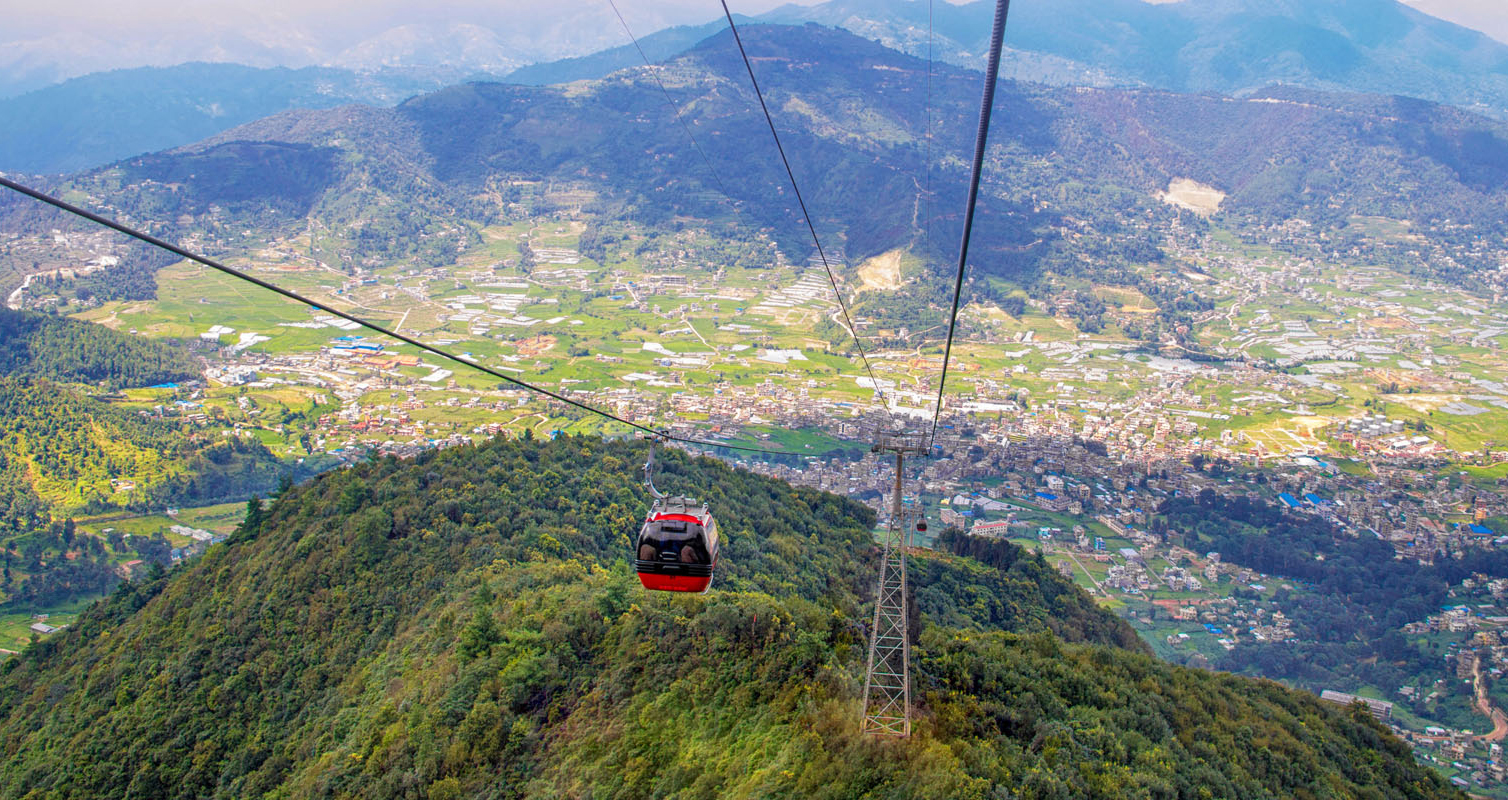
- Interactive map of Chandragiri Cable Car

Overview
- Status: Operational
- Character: Recreational
- System: Public Transport
- Location: Chandragiri, Kathmandu
- Country: Nepal
- Coordinates: 27.686321°N 85.214510°E Bottom Station; 27.667243°N 85.205841°E Top Station
- Termini: Thankot, Chandragiri; Chandragiri Hills
- No. of stations: 2
- Open: December 15, 2016; 9 years ago
- Website: www.chandragirihills.com

Operation
- Owner: Chandragiri Hills Ltd.
- Operator: Chandragiri Hills Ltd.
- No. of carriers: 38
- Carrier capacity: 8
- Ridership: 10,000
- Operating times: 8:00-17:00 (weekdays), 7:00-18:00 (weekends)
- Trips daily: 200
- Trip duration: 9-12 minutes
- Fare: Rs700 Nepalese, Rs700 SARRC countries, $22 Foreigners

Technical features
- Aerial lift type: Mono-cable detachable gondola
- Manufactured by: Doppelmayr and executed by Aarconinfra Ropeways under quality control of Garaventa
- Line length: 2,500 m (8,200 ft)
- No. of support towers: 11
- No. of cables: 1
- Operating speed: 5.0 m/s

Chandragiri Cable Car is a gondola lift transportation system located in Chandragiri Municipality, Nepal. Opened in 2016, the Chandragiri Cable Car runs from Thankot to Chandragiri hills. The 2.4km (9,095ft) line has two stations. The cable car system consists of 38 gondolas that can carry 1,000 people per hour. Bhaleshwor Mahadev temple is situated at the top of Chandragiri hills.

The 2.4 km cable car ride takes 9 minutes to reach the Chandragiri Hills’ top station. A cabin accommodates 8 passengers. A child above 3 feet of height requires a ticket.

The system's lower station was set on fire during the 2025 Nepalese Gen Z protests on 9 September.

== Ticket rates ==
Ticket rates
| | Nepalese | SAARC | Chinese | FOREIGN |
| ONE WAY | NPR 495 | NPR 790 | USD 9 | USD 13 |
| ROUND TRIP | NPR 825 | NPR 1320 | USD 16 | USD 23 |

Gallery
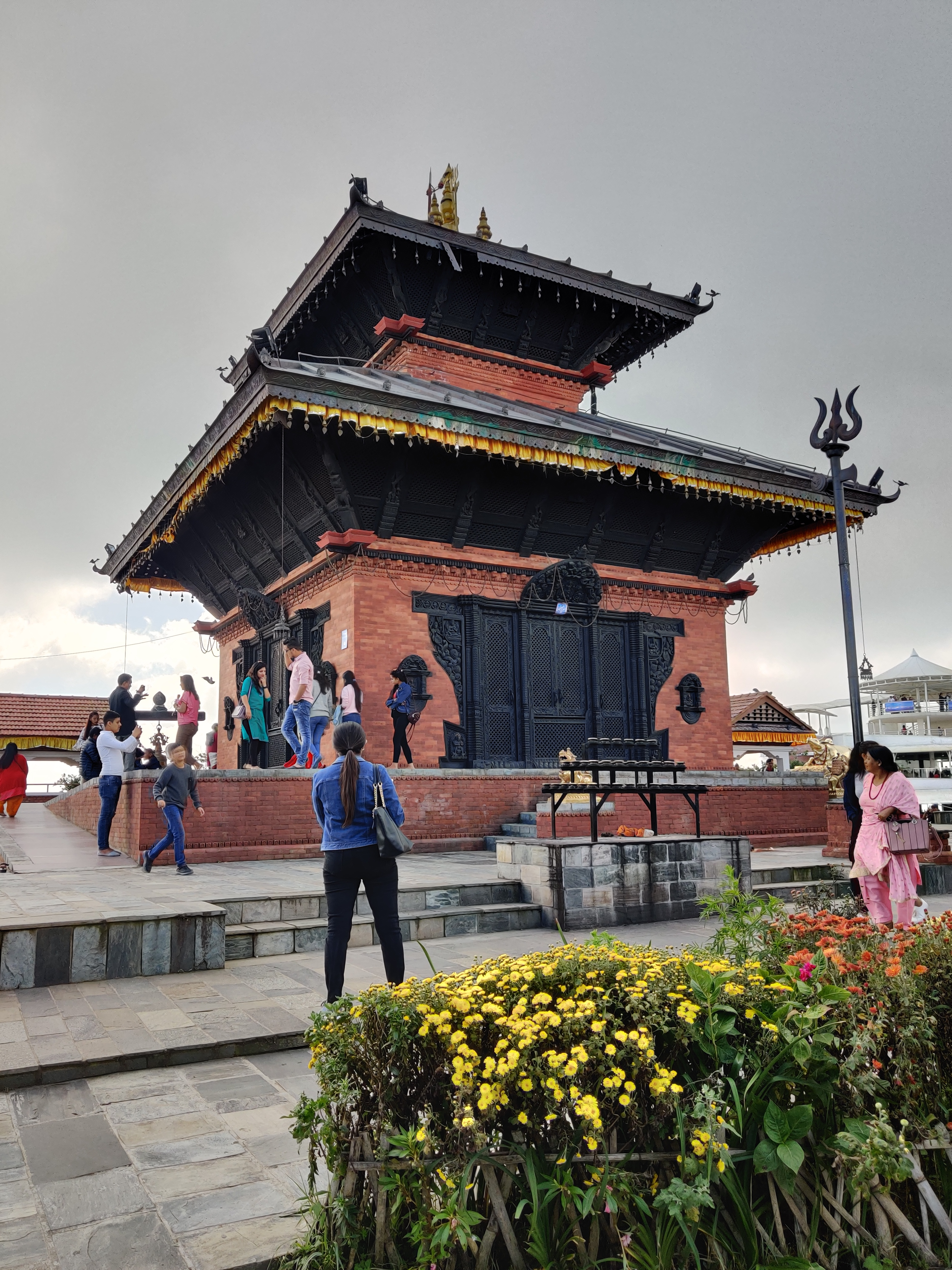
Bhaleshwor Mahadev Temple, Chandragiri Hill, Nepal

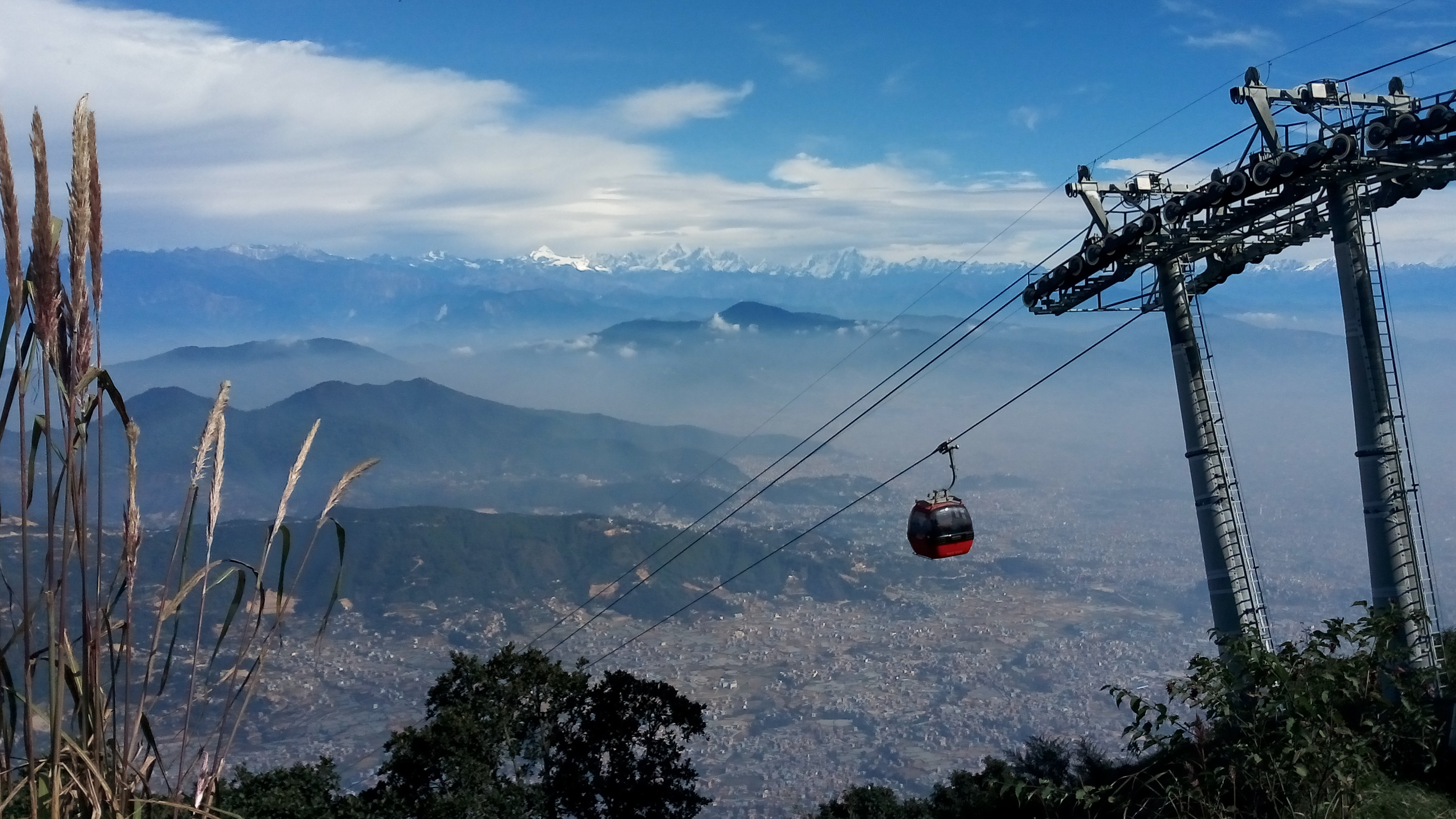
Kathmandu Valley view from the cable car

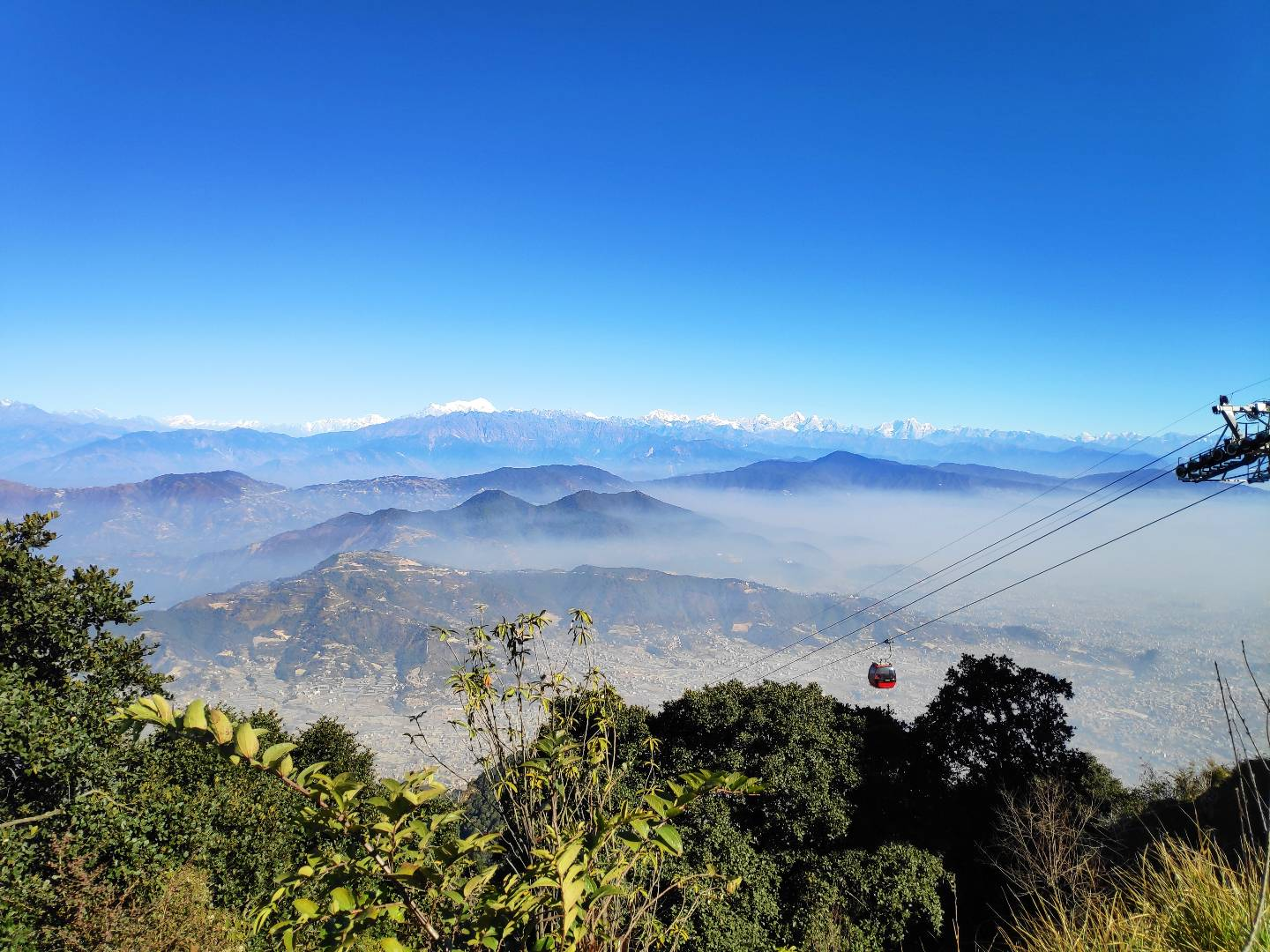
Himalayan range from the hill

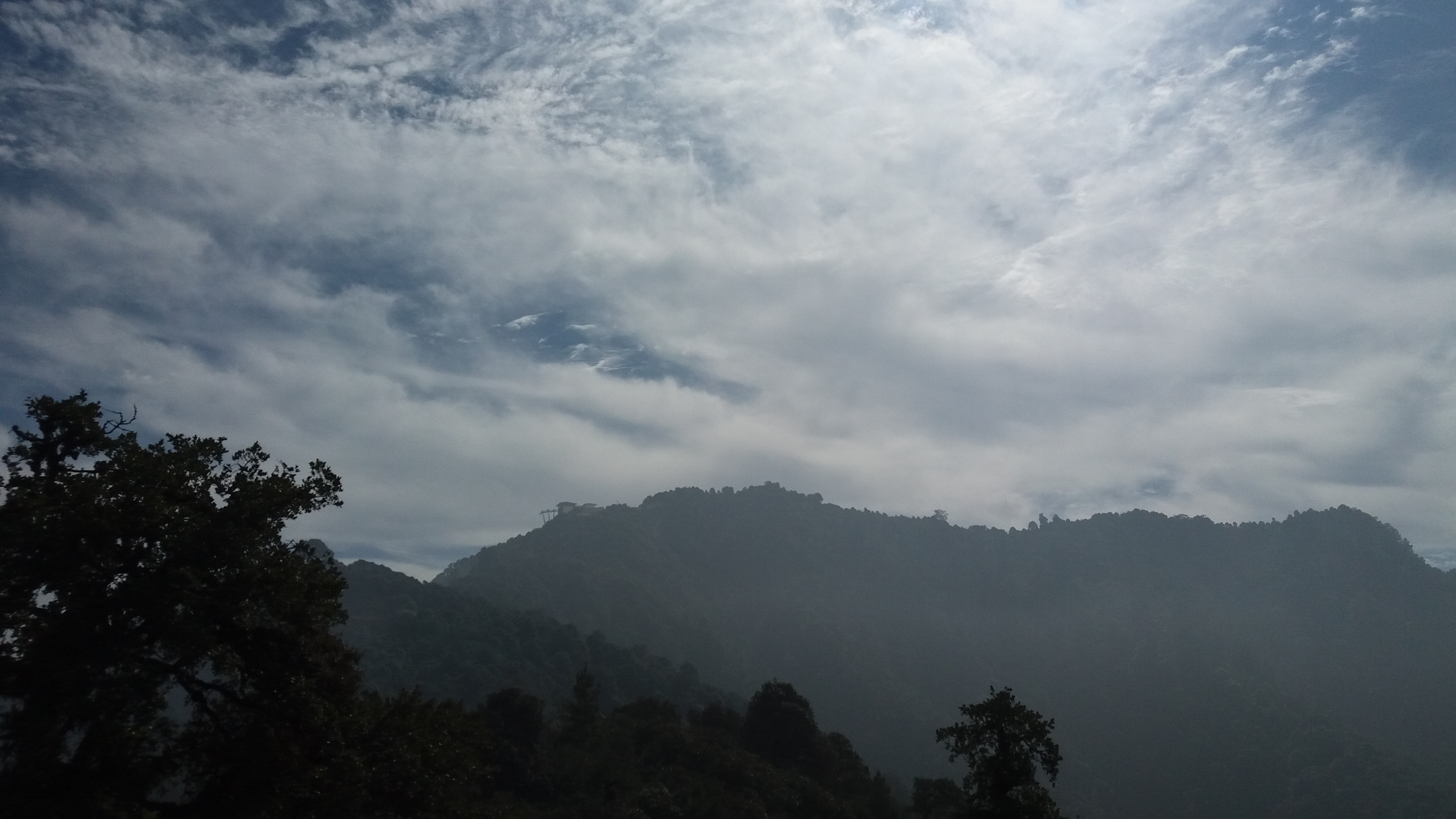
View of Chandragiri Hill, Nepal

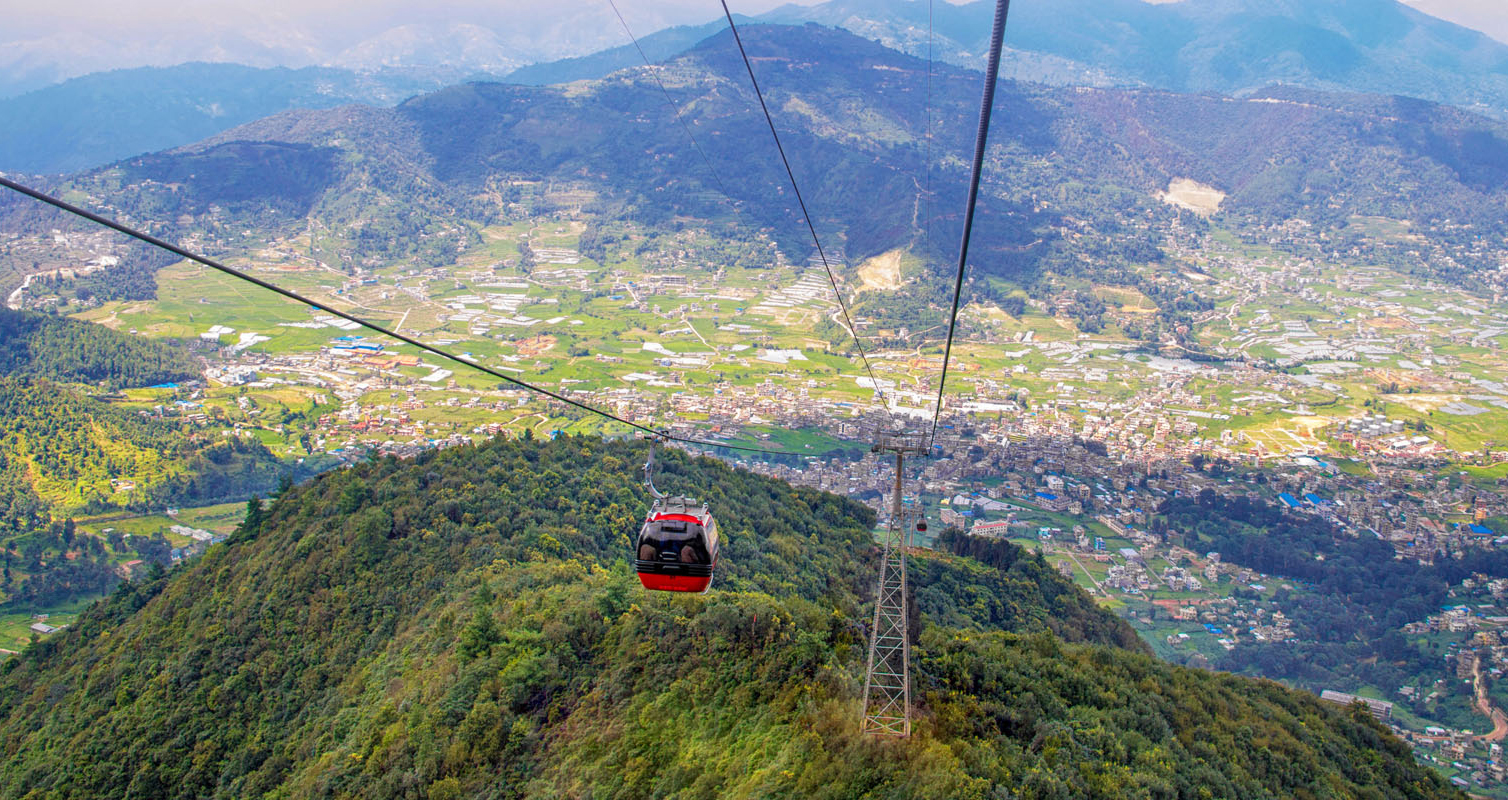

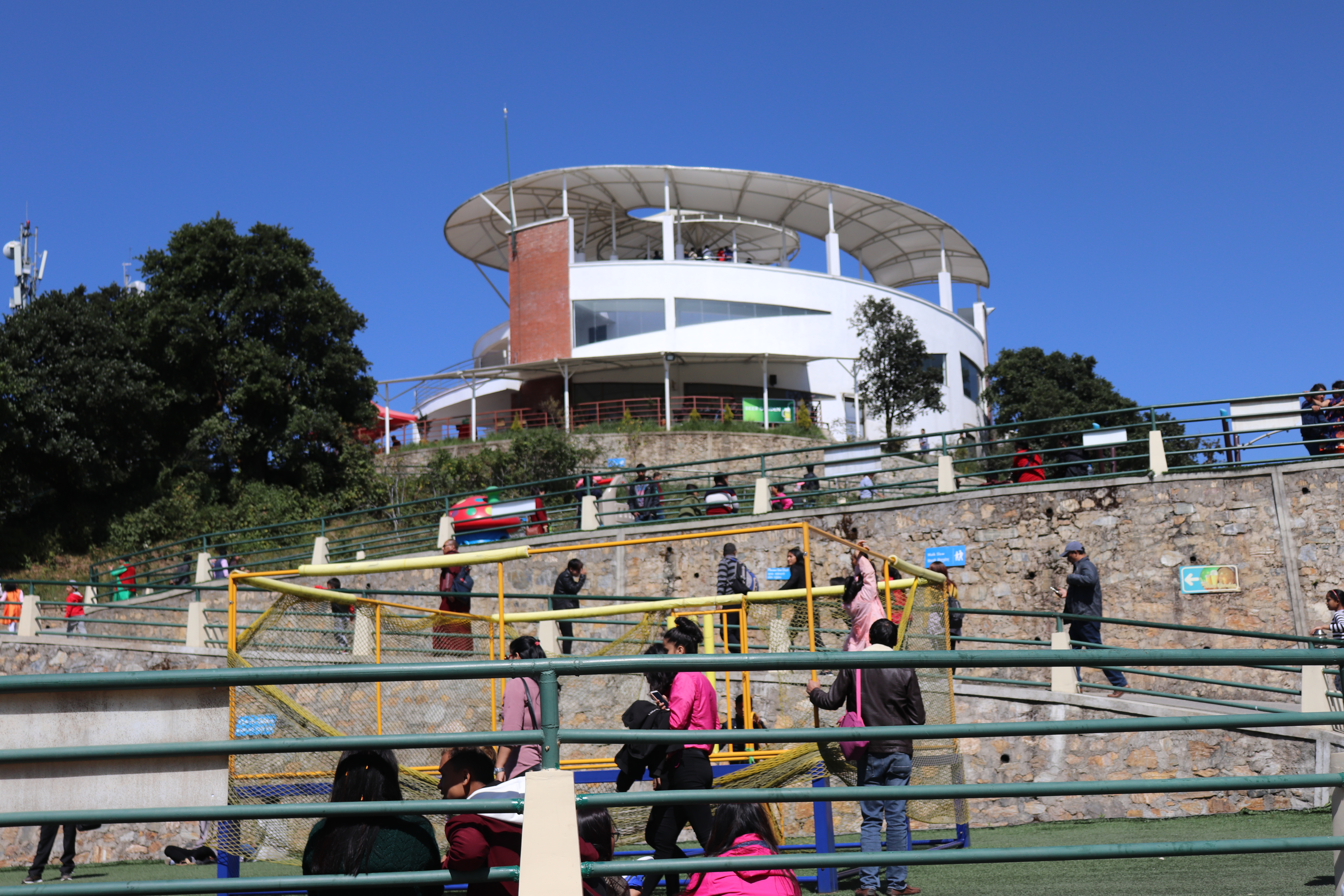

== See also ==
- Manakamana Cable Car
- List of gondola lifts
