= Dawa Lama Tamang =

Nepalese politician

Dawa Tamang
- दावा तामाङ

Minister of Youth and Sports
- In office 25 December 2020 – 20 May 2021
- President: Bidya Devi Bhandari
- Prime Minister: KP Oli
- Preceded by: Jagat Bahadur Sunar Bishwakarma
- Succeeded by: Ekbal Miya

Personal details
- Party: CPN (UML)

Dawa Tamang (Nepali: दावा तामाङ) is a nepalese politician and former Minister of Youth and Sports of Government of Nepal .

== See also ==
- 2021 split in Communist Party of Nepal (Maoist Centre)
