= Nepal Art Council =

Art-based organization in Nepal

- नेपाल कला-परिषद्
- Abbreviation: NAC
- Formation: 1962; 64 years ago
- Founder: King Mahendra
- Type: NGO, Nonprofit
- Headquarters: Baber Mahal, Kathmandu
- Founding President: Kirti Nidhi Bista
- Founding General Secretary: Lain Singh Bangdel
- Founding Treasurer: Lt. General Mrigendra SJB Rana
- Website: www.nepalartcouncil.org.np

Nepal Art Council (Nepali: नेपाल कला-परिषद्) is a non-profit organization established in 1962 (2019 BS) to promote the art and the artists of Nepal. It operates an art gallery located at Baber Mahal, Kathmandu, with an area of about 29,400 square feet (2,730 m^{2}).

== History ==
King Mahendra had appointed the then Prime Minister Kirti Nidhi Bista as the founding President, Lain Singh Bangdel as the General Secretary and Mrigendra SJB Rana as the treasurer. It was conceived as a Public-Private partnership organisation. The current building was constructed in 1991 and was designed by Shankar Nath Rimal.

== See also ==
- National Museum of Nepal
- Nepal Academy of Fine Arts
