= Marchawari Rural Municipality =

Marchawari मर्चवारी
- Municipality
- Location in Lumbini Province Marchawari (Nepal)
- Coordinates: 27.370218°N 83.329978°E
- Country: Nepal
- Development Region: Western
- Province: Lumbini Province
- District: Rupandehi District

Government
  - Chairperson: Gaya prasad Barai (JPP-N)
  - Deputy Chairperson: Asha singh (JPP-N)

Area
  - Total: 58.26 km^{2} (22.49 sq mi)

Population (2011)
  - Total: 38,776
  - Density: 665.6/km^{2} (1,724/sq mi)
  - Ethnicities: Yadav(Ahir)kurmikoiri Barai
  - Religion: Sanatan Hindu(most populated) Islam ( less)

Bhojpuri
  - Local: Bhojpuri
- Time zone: UTC+5:45 (Nepal Time)
- Area code: 071

Marchawari Rural Municipality (Nepali :मर्चवारीमाई गाउँपालिका) is a Gaunpalika in Rupandehi District in Lumbini Province of Nepal. On 12 March 2017, the government of Nepal implemented a new local administrative structure, with the implementation of the new local administrative structure, VDCs have been replaced with municipal and Village Councils. Marchawari is one of these 753 local units.

Prabins Yadav

== See also ==
- People's Progressive Party, Nepal
