= Bikram Khanal =

Nepalese politician

Honourable Bikram Khanal
- बिक्रम खनाल

Member of Parliament, Pratinidhi Sabha
- Incumbent
- Assumed office 26 March 2026
- Preceded by: Binod Chaudhary
- Constituency: Nawalparasi 1

Personal details
- Citizenship: Nepalese
- Party: Rastriya Swatantra Party
- Other political affiliations: Nepali Congress (Till June 2025)
- Profession: Politician

Bikram Khanal (Nepali: बिक्रम खनाल) is a Nepalese politician serving as a member of parliament from the Rastriya Swatantra Party. He is the member of the 7th Pratinidhi Sabha elected from Nawalparasi 1 constituency in 2026 Nepalese General Election securing 45,241 votes and defeating the closest contender Binod Chaudhary of the Nepali Congress. He was a former lumbini province committee general secretary, an elected member of the Constituent Assembly from the Nepali Congress. He was expelled from the Nepali Congress after the meeting of the Congress Central Disciplinary Committee on 17 June 2025 and later joined RSP.
