= Nawalparasi (Bardaghat Susta West) 1 =

Parliamentary constituency in Nepal

- Parliamentary constituency
- Nawalarasi (Bardaghat Susta West) 1 in Lumbini Province
- Province: Lumbini Province
- District: Nawalparasi (West of Bardaghat Susta)

Current constituency
- Created: 2017
- Party: Rastriya Swatantra Party
- Member of Parliament: Bikram Khanal

Nawalparasi (Bardaghat Susta West) 1 is one of two parliamentary constituencies of Nawalparasi (West of Bardaghat Susta) district in Nepal. This constituency came into existence on the Constituency Delimitation Commission (CDC) report submitted on 31 August 2017.

== Incorporated areas ==
Nawalparasi (Bardaghat Susta West) 1 incorporates Bardaghat Municipality, Susta Rural Municipality, Pratappur Rural Municipality and wards 4, 5, 6 and 7 of Sarawal Rural Municipality.

== Assembly segments ==
It encompasses the following Lumbini Provincial Assembly segment

- Nawalparasi (Bardaghat Susta West) 1(A)
- Nawalparasi (Bardaghat Susta West) 1(B)

== Members of Parliament ==
=== Parliament/Constituent Assembly ===
Election	Member	Party
2017	Hridayesh Tripathi	CPN (Unified Marxist–Leninist)
May 2018	Hridayesh Tripathi	Nepal Communist Party
December 2021	Hridayesh Tripathi	People's Progressive Party
2022	Binod Chaudhary	Nepali Congress
2026	Bikram Khanal	Rastriya Swatantra Party

=== Provincial Assembly ===
==== 1(A) ====
Election	Member	Party
2017	Dipendra Kumar Adhikari	CPN (Unified Marxist–Leninist)
May 2018	Dipendra Kumar Adhikari	Nepal Communist Party

==== 1(B) ====
Election	Member	Party
2017	Ajay Shahi	CPN (Unified Marxist–Leninist)
May 2018	Ajay Shahi	Nepal Communist Party
August 2021	Ajay Shahi	People's Progressive Party

== Election results ==
=== Election in the 2020s ===
==== 2022 general election ====
Candidate	Party	Votes	%
Binod Chaudhary	Nepali Congress	29,519	37.33
Hridayesh Tripathi	People's Progressive Party	22,328	28.23
Mahendra Sen Thakuri	Rastriya Swatantra Party	12,499	15.80
Gulab Prasad Chaudhary	Janamat Party	5,952	7.53
Bhojraj Dhakal	Rastriya Prajatantra Party	4,825	6.10
Ganga Ram Chaudhary	Nagrik Unmukti Party	1,405	1.78
Ajay Shahi	Independent	1,106	1.40
Others		1,451	1.83
Total		79,085	100.00
Majority		7,191	
Nepali Congress gain			

=== Election in the 2010s ===
==== 2017 legislative elections ====
Party	Candidate	Votes
CPN (Unified Marxist–Leninist)	Hridayesh Tripathi	38,592
Nepali Congress	Devkaran Prasad Kalwar	33,491
Rastriya Janamukti Party	Sumitra Thapa	1,193
Rastriya Janata Party Nepal	Arun Kumar Singh Gharti	907
Others		1,499
Result	CPN (UML) gain	
Source: Election Commission

==== 2017 Nepalese provincial elections ====
===== 1(A) =====
Party	Candidate	Votes
CPN (Unified Marxist–Leninist)	Dipendra Kumar Adhikari	20,506
Nepali Congress	Bikram Khanal	18,502
Rastriya Janamukti Party	Purna Bahadur Bishwakarma	1,012
Rastriya Janata Party Nepal	Gulab Prasad Chaudhary	965
Others		681
Result	CPN (UML) gain	
Source: Election Commission

===== 1(B) =====
Party	Candidate	Votes
CPN (Unified Marxist–Leninist)	Ajay Shahi	19,333
Nepali Congress	Mukul Kumar Acharya	12,603
Rastriya Janata Party Nepal	Asraf Ali Churihar	1,078
Federal Socialist Forum, Nepal	Ganga Ram Chaudhari	856
Others		498
Result	CPN (UML) gain	
Source: Election Commission

== See also ==
- List of parliamentary constituencies of Nepal
