= Binod Chaudhary =

Nepalese billionaire

- बिनोद चौधरी
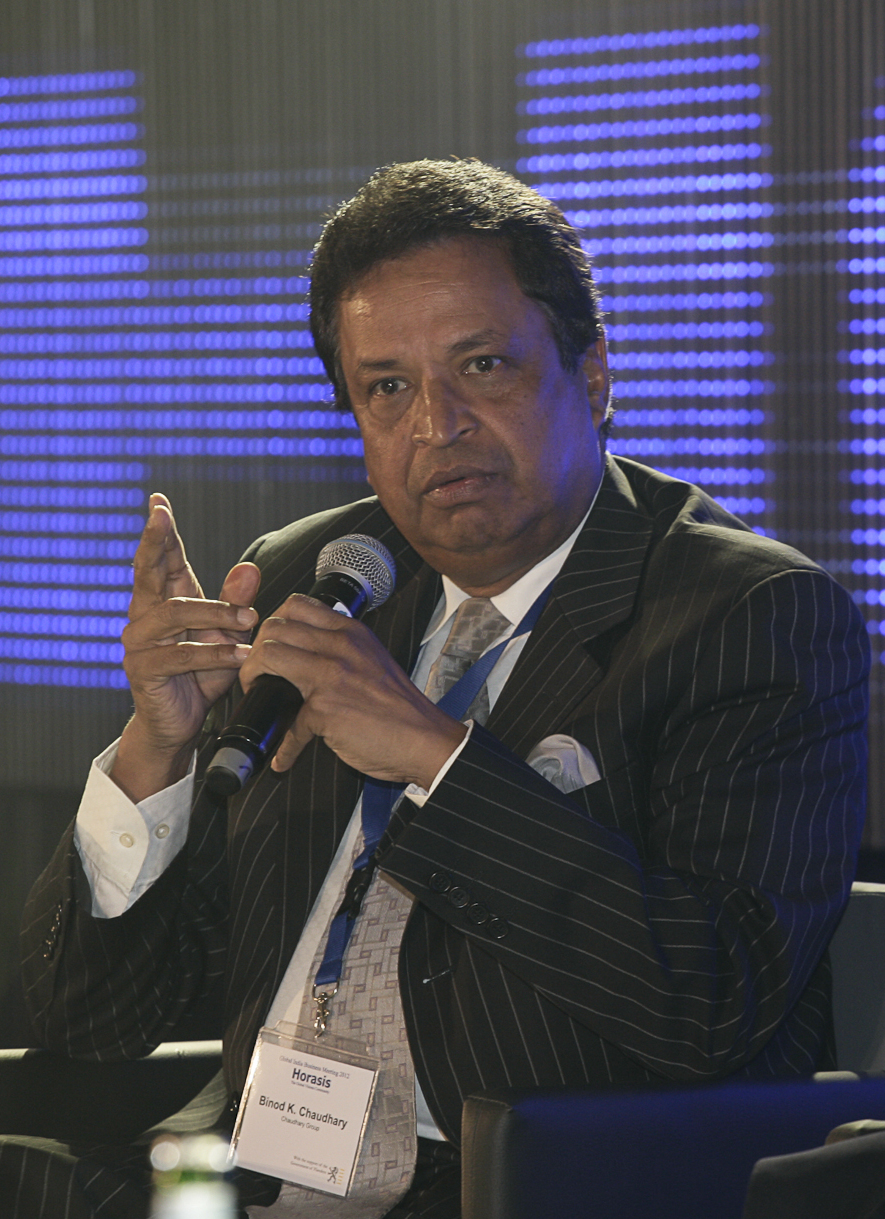

Member of Parliament, House of Representatives
- In office 22 December 2022 – 12 September 2025
- Preceded by: Hridayesh Tripathi
- Succeeded by: Bikram Khanal
- Constituency: Parasi 1
- In office 4 March 2018 – 18 September 2022
- Constituency: Party list

Vice President of the Nepali Congress
- Incumbent
- Assumed office 29 October 2026 Serving with Chandra Bhandari, Pushpa Bhusal Gautam, Madhu Prasad Acharya
- President: Gagan Thapa

Member of 1st Nepalese Constituent Assembly for CPN (UML) party list
- In office 28 May 2008 – 28 May 2012

Personal details
- Born: 14 April 1955 (age 71) Kathmandu, Nepal
- Party: Nepali Congress (since 2017)
- Other political affiliations: CPN (UML)
- Spouse: Sarika Chaudhary
- Children: 3
- Occupation: President of Chaudhary Group
- Known for: Chaudhary Group

Binod Chaudhary (Nepali: विनोद चौधरी; born 14 April 1955) is a Nepalese billionaire businessman, politician and philanthropist. He is the chairman and president of the Chaudhary Group (CG).

In February 2013, he was recognised as Nepal's wealthiest person and only billionaire, having an estimated net worth of $1 billion. Since 2013, his net worth has risen to $1.7 billion. Besides his business, which focuses on distribution, retail, leisure and manufacturing, he has done charity work, bookwriting, and filmmaking.

== Early life ==
Binod Kumar Chaudhary was born in Kathmandu, Nepal, to a Marwari family. His grandfather, Bhuramal Das Chaudhary, was an entrepreneur who started a textile business. His father was also a businessman who further developed his grandfather's business. Early in his career, Chaudhary chose to pursue further education rather than join the family business.

Chaudhary credits his grandfather and father as inspirations. He is a fan of Bollywood icons Amitabh Bachchan and Ranbir Kapoor. He admires Nelson Mandela, the former president of South Africa, for bringing freedom to that country, and businessman J. R. D. Tata, for "building a company of rare distinction".

== Business career ==
=== Early career ===
His grandfather, Bhuramal Das Chaudhary, migrated to Nepal from Rajasthan, India, in the 19th century. After his arrival at age 20, he started a textile business. A few years later, after the 1934 Nepal–Bihar earthquake, he became the first in Nepal to start a formally registered clothing company. His father, Lunkaran Das Chaudhary, continued to develop the textile business, and also established international-trading houses, and a construction company. In 1968 Lunkaran Das Chaudhary founded Arun Emporium, a retail store which was his most successful enterprise. At the age of eighteen, Binod Chaudhary was about to head to India to study chartered accountancy, but his father was diagnosed with heart disease and the doctor told him his father could not continue to run the family business. As he was the eldest son in the family he stepped in as head of the business. He told The Telegraph, "My life was overnight changed completely. I did not have a choice at all. But it has made me a tougher man." He also stated "I would have liked to study further but I was required to do my duty" in an interview with the Hong Kong Tatler.

At first, he considered importing Japanese Suzuki cars to Nepal. He once wrote that "Suzuki did not trust me as I was a young clothes trader. I convinced them. They gave me a trial dealership along with four others to sell Suzuki in Nepal. Whoever sold most cars in six months would get the dealership."

His first independent business was in 1973—a discothèque company called Copper Floor. The company was a huge success, because of the many wealthy and powerful people who visited the club. In 1979, Chaudhary made a deal with Japanese electronic firm National Panasonic, which was his first multinational deal.

=== Chaudhary Group ===
The Chaudhary Group is a business group, founded by Chaudhary's grandfather Lunkaran Das Chaudhary. Wai Wai, a brand of instant noodles, introduced to Nepal in 1984, became the company's bestseller. Chaudhary took over his family company at the age of 23, and wrote "running that disco taught me a lot about business but it was only when I took over the family business of running Arun Emporium, turning its fortune and looking after family, I understood the business." The idea to sell Wai Wai noodles came to Chaudhary after seeing many people from Thailand with packets of noodles. Soon after that, he realized that there was a craving for Thai noodles in Nepal. He went to Thailand, where he visited Thai Preserved Food Factory Co. Ltd., the company that produced Wai Wai noodles for Thailand. He wanted to collaborate with the company, however, the owner was not that confident the idea of bringing the noodles to Nepal would work due to the country's "poverty and poor infrastructure".

Chaudhary told Forbes India:

Yes, back then I was simply looking to create a product from flour and then I decided on this product. Flying to Bangkok and back, I saw many cases of noodles on the baggage belt and I would ask people: 'Why are there so many of these cases coming from Thailand?' They would tell me that people loved them. I think people have grown with the product. To begin with, Wai Wai wasn't easily available in India. Today we have 20 percent market share in India. Now we're looking at creating a large national campaign here. We do localised marketing, but this is going to be a big one.

After seeing Chaudhary's enthusiasm, he taught him how to make the noodles. He also told the Bangkok Post, "I'm a great admirer of Thailand and this company that has given our group this kind of status."

In 2013, Chaudhary was listed as Nepal's first billionaire by Forbes. As of March 2019 he is listed at number 1,349 on Forbes' Billionaires of 2019 list. After the announcement, he said, "I am humbled. As a businessman, you don't get a Nobel. This is my Nobel Prize, ... I see this as a recognition for the 40 years of my hard work". In 2015 he was featured in cover of Forbes Asia. By 2018 his fortune had risen by $200 million. After appearing in the list he stated that, "Forbes' Billionaire List is the result of the blood and sweat of four generations. I am proud to say that there are 7000 people associated with the Chaudhary Group (CG) in 19 countries."

In Daman, India during November 2019 the local administration confiscated the valuable beachfront land and bulldozed the homes of the local indigenous fishing community. The ensuing 2019 Daman Indigenous Landgrabbing Protests resulted with the detention of 70 protesters in schools converted to 'temporary jails' and another eight arrests. Few of the adivasi fisherfolk were rehoused whilst most languished traumatised and homeless on the streets near the rubble of their razed homes. As of March 2021 the site is now CG Corp Global's The Fern Seaside Luxurious Tent Resort offering tourist accommodation for $80US/£57GBP/Rs6000 for a night in a tent.

=== Other businesses ===
In 1995, Chaudhary bought the Dubai government's controlling stake in the Nabil Bank. He started Cinnovation Group on Singapore in 1990. Cinnovation Group is one of the first highly pervasive multinational Nepali companies. The company has interests in hotels and resorts, wildlife and in-bound tourism, FMCG (food and beverage), real estate, cement, and financial services. Chaudhary has also started to show interest in joint ventures with Taj Hotels Group. He also wants Nepal to move to a certain point where other investors see it as a safe place to invest. Has said that, "The government must become investment friendly and appreciate wealth creation and entrepreneurship. We need to give investors confidence in us to take Nepal forward. That's my single biggest priority."

== Politics ==
=== Early politics ===
In 1979 his first multinational collaboration needed a license from Nepal's government. At that time Surya Bahadur Thapa was in power. When he asked Chaudhary and his father for financial advice "to fund the campaign for the retention of Panchayat regime," they decided to support Thapa's political campaign. After his downfall, Chaudhary contacted Dhirendra Shah. He said he was forced to work with the Dhirendra of Nepal, "I had to do business with Dhirendra due to the need of that time. Rather than making profits from the investment, he gave me protection. Afterwards, the same security brought troubles".

In the first People's Movement, which occurred in 1990, he became close with parliamentary parties including the Communist Party of Nepal (Unified Marxist–Leninist) (CPN-UML). He was involved working on the draft of their economic policy in 1994. This led to him becoming a member of the Constituent Assembly nominated by the party in 2008. He has also said, "I would like to see Nepal's politics being driven by economic growth. I want to see someone who does not compromise the country's interests for his personal or party-oriented agendas."

=== Nepali Congress ===
In 2017, Chaudhary joined the Nepali Congress party, led by Sher Bahadur Deuba.He was elected as Member of Parliament of the Federal Parliament in 5th House of Representatives and again in 6th House of Representatives from Nawalparasi-1 constituency, representing Nepali Congress. He lost the 2026 general election after the 2025 Gen-z protest. He was elected to the position of Vice-president of the party in its 15th general convention.

=== CPN-UML ===
He was a member of the parliament of Nepal, representing the Communist Party of Nepal-Unified Marxist Leninist. He has said that, "They [CPN-UML] wanted me to come and contribute in the making of the Constitution as a person who is known within and outside the country." He was also a UML lawmaker before that program went defunct.

== Other works ==
=== Author ===
In 2013, Chaudhary released his autobiography, titled "Binod Chaudhary: Atmakatha". The book was later translated into English by journalist Sanjeev Ghimire, titled "Binod Chaudhary – My Life: From the Streets of Kathmandu to a Billion Dollar Empire", and sometimes called "Making It Big: The Inspiring Story of Nepal's First Billionaire in His Own Words" which was released on 2015. The book was launched in India under the title Ek Unchi Udaan. Chaudhary told Forbes India, "When I made up my mind to write this book, I also decided that I would not manipulate it". The book was called a must read for everyone. Some sources said, "It charts the immensely successful and interesting life story of a self-made man who never forgot to enjoy or live his life while navigating his way up a volatile, unstable and unfriendly environment."

The Kathmandu Post wrote, "The 327-page autobiography published by Nepalaya reveals a lot about Chaudhary, who was an unusual Marwari. Against the Marwari tradition, he went for a love marriage, that too when he was already engaged with another lady. Starting a discotheque—Copper Floor—in early 70s in Kathmandu was again unthinkable at the time for someone from Marwari family." Rajan Thapaliya of the HuffPost wrote, "I recommend Mr. Chaudhary's book for those looking to expand and improve their knowledge. His information is approached from a plethora of angles and he uses his mistakes as a learning tool. He his a charismatic man with a vision." Nirmal Thapa wrote, "Binod Chaudhary's autobiography is a very good read for someone to understand how the entrepreneur built a billion dollar empire. A must read for the youth of the country and for aspiring/current entrepreneurs who want to build a multinational company from Nepal."

=== Charity works ===
On the same days as the April 2015 Nepal earthquake, he organized relief efforts in Kathmandu. He arranged for health care workers to help the victims of the earthquake in 12 districts of Nepal. He has donated more than $2.5 million to help rebuild schools and homes destroyed by the earthquake, and the Chaudhary Group has also donated 500,000 packets of Wai Wai noodles, thousands of juice cartons, and food and water to people in need. Chaudhary Group donated Rs 150 Million Multi-Phase Relief and Rehabilitation Plan for Flood Victims following the catastrophic 2026 Nepal–Tibet floods.

==== Chaudhary Foundation ====
He has his own charity, called the Chaudhary Foundation. It has signed the United Nations Development Programme for the advancement and promotion of Sustainable Development Goals (SDGs) in Nepal. The foundation was established in 1995. After the serious earthquake the foundation has been helping to rebuild Nepal. The foundation has also handed over 166 shelters for victims of the earthquake to the Kumpur Village Development Committee (VDC) located in Dhading. They have also said, "Chaudhary Foundation is willing to join hands with the National Reconstruction Authority on its mission of rebuilding Nepal. We hope that the rebuilding efforts are driven in a way to boost the country's economic development. Our Foundation wishes to significantly contribute toward that direction."

== Awards ==
In 2015 he was honoured by Sri Sri University for his outstanding contribution in philanthropy; he was given an honorary doctorate degree. In 2016 he was awarded Asian Man of the Year Award. Later in 2016 he was also awarded the 2016 Frost & Sullivan Growth, Innovation and Leadership (GIL) Award. In 2019 he was awarded with Lifetime Achievement Award by Hotelivate.

== Personal life ==
He is married and has three children.

== Controversy ==
Binod Chaudhary has been subject to various allegations and controversies over the years. Chaudhary has faced accusations of tax evasion, financial irregularities, and alleged monopolistic practices within certain sectors. Notably, he has established prominent relationships with political entities in power, including Prince Dhirendra during the monarchy rule in Nepal, and later affiliations with CPN-UML and Nepali Congress after Nepal transitioned into a republic. One significant controversy involves the alleged privatization of land belonging to the Bansbari Shoe Factory, a government entity. Investigations revealed that Chaudhary's company took control of shares allocated to the public during the privatization process, subsequently gaining control of the land. Additionally, one of Chaudhary Group's subsidiaries, Apollo Steel Industries, faced accusations of land grabbing in Satungal, Kathmandu. Local communities have accused the company of usurping a public road, which is currently fenced off and part of the premises housing CG Electronics. This dispute dates back to 1987 and the road in question still remains closed to the public. Furthermore, Chaudhary's investment in Hotel Summit has been marred by allegations of procedural lapses and neglect regarding neighboring properties. Investigations revealed the company's failure to obtain approval from local authorities for construction and circumvention of mandatory Environmental Impact Assessments (EIA). He was also named in the Pandora Papers leak in 2021. While his son denies allegations, stating compliance with the law, investigations suggest the use of loopholes to circumvent Nepal's legal restrictions on owning foreign assets and capital controls for global business expansion. Chaudhary himself has alluded to such practices in his autobiography.
