= Devachuli =

Devchuli Municipality देवचुली नगरपालिका
- Municipality
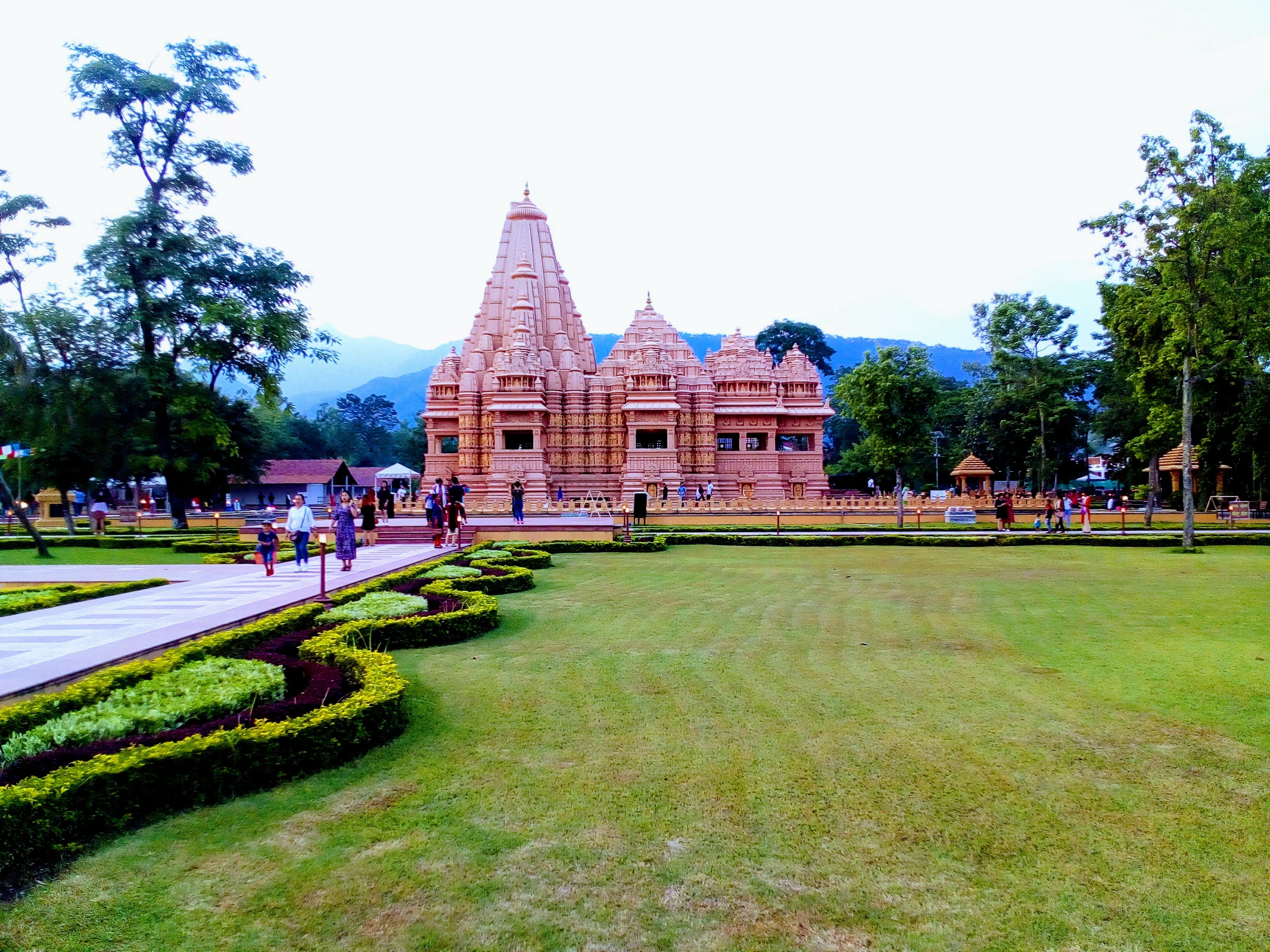
- Shashwat Dham

- Location in Nepal Devchuli Municipality (Nepal)
- Coordinates: 27.74°N 84.18°E
- Country: Nepal
- Province: Gandaki Province
- District: Nawalpur District

Government
  - Mayor: Hari Neupane (NCP)
  - Deputy Mayor: Parbati Tiwari (NCP)

Population (2011)
  - Total: 42,603
- Time zone: UTC+5:45 (NST)
- Website: http://devchulimun.gov.np

Devchuli Municipality is a municipality in Nawalpur District in the southern part of Gandaki Province in Nepal. At the time of the 2011 Nepal census it had a population of 42,603 people living in 916 individual households. The municipality was established on 18 May 2014 by merging the preexisting Devchuli, Dibyapuri, Pragatinagar VDCs and later Rajahar VDC. The Narayani River flows in the vicinity. Northern side of the municipality is covered by hills with major population of ethnic Magar people and their culture. Northern areas are also least developed, rural and lack basic infrastructures, such as roads, hospitals and clean drinking water supply. Southern plain areas are developing and has major concentration of population. Municipality has great ethnic and cultural diversity, made of indigenous Tharu, Magar and all other major ethnic groups and culture residing harmoniously.

== Major tourist attractions ==
Major tourist attraction are as following:

CG Saswat Dham - A modern pilgrimage hub visited by hundreds of thousands pilgrims and tourists every year.

Narayani River banks and Chitwan National Park - popular among tourists who want to experience unique biodiversity and wildlife, such as one horned Rhinos, Royal Bangal tigers and all others. Naryani River is regarded as sacred among Hindu pilgrims and many religious celebrations takes place in its bank throughout the year. Ekadashi mela and maghe sakranti mela are some of the major events visited by thousands.

Community tharu homestays, resorts and restaurants of piprahar area - These homestays and restaurants provide visitors with tharu traditional cuisine and hospitality. Authentic and organic foods and hospitality provided by these facilities attracts thousands of visitors every year. Proximity of National Park and Naryani River provides clam and peaceful escape form hustle bustle of the cities.

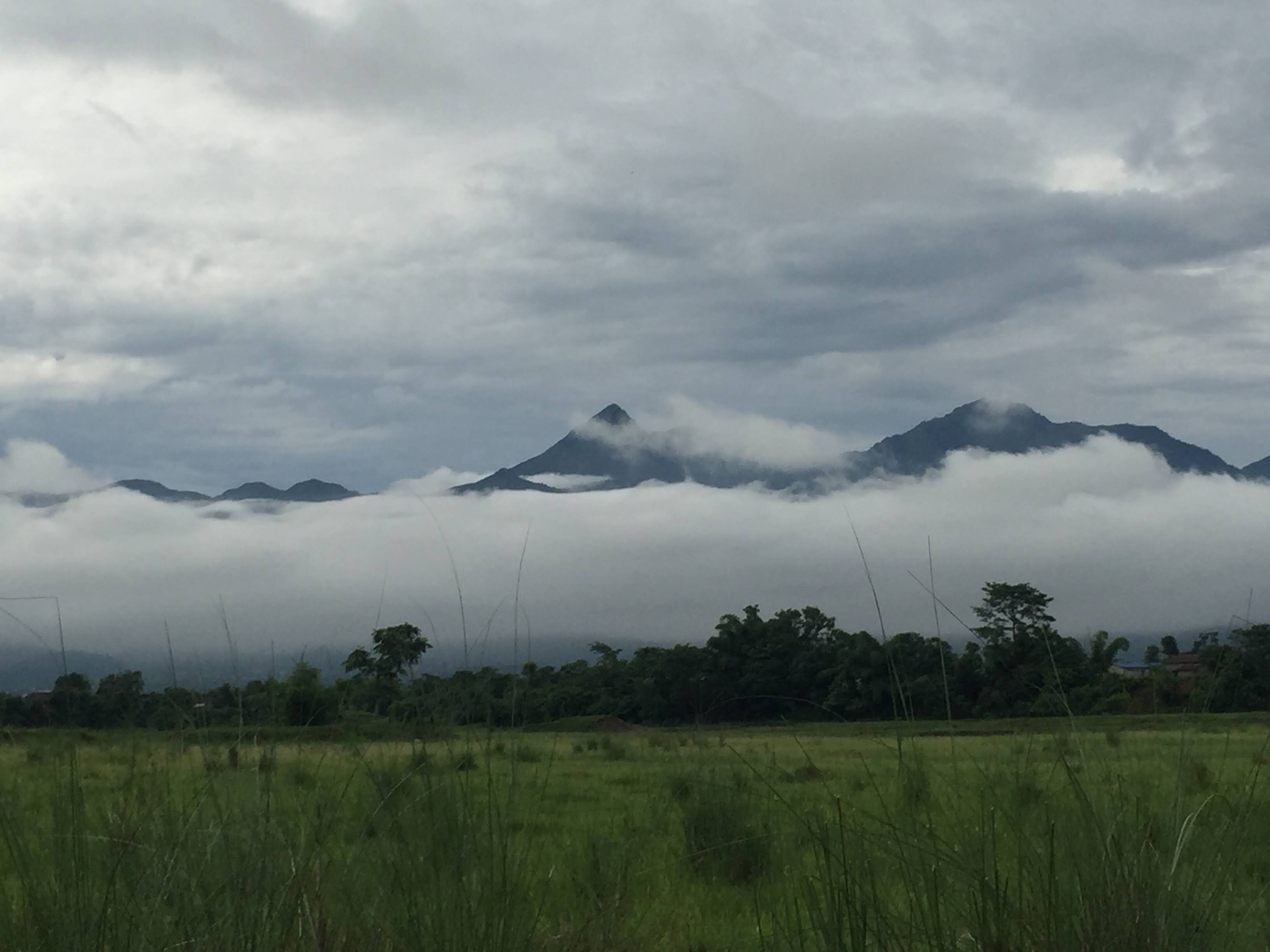
Devchuli hills

Devchuli and Barchuli hills - these are the tallest hills of Nawalpur district. Considered as sacred place of worship by both Magar people of hills and tharu people of plains, these hills has their own cultural and historic importance. Apart from being culturally relevant, these hills are also natural gems, famous for hiking and sightseeing. Thousands of tourists hike in these hills every year and enjoy the great sightseeing from the top of the tallest hills. Mighty Himalayan ranges are seen clearly in the north. One can see far up to palpa, chitwan, National Park on a clear day. Hikers also get chance to enjoy indigenous Magar culture and organic foods during their hike.
