= Shankar Nath Rimal =

Nepalese engineer (born 1935)

- शङ्करनाथ रिमाल
- Born: 5 March 1935 (age 91); Tangal, Kathmandu, Nepal
- Education: Bengal Engineering College
- Occupations: Engineer, architect
- Known for: Designing the modern flag of Nepal
- Spouse: Shashi Rimal
- Children: 3
- Parents: Devendra Nath Rimal (father); Sita Devi Rimal (mother)

Shankar Nath Rimal (born 5 March 1935) is a Nepalese civil engineer and architect. He is best known for standardising the modern Nepalese flag. He has also designed many prominent buildings and monuments in Nepal. Sahid gate of Sundhara, Ramananda gate of Janakpur, Bhaleshwar temple of Chandragiri hill and Solatee hotel are some of the prominent structures he has designed.

== Early life and education ==
He was born on 5 March 1935 (22 Falgun 1991 BS) in Tangal, Kathmandu to father Devendra Nath Rimal and mother Sita Devi Rimal. He received his primary education from Nandiratri School, Naxal and completed his SLC-level education from Durbar High School in 1950. He enrolled in Bengal Engineering College to study electrical engineering under Colombo plan but later shifted to civil engineering. He graduated in 1957.

== Career ==
He standardised the flag of Nepal in 1962 on the request of King Mahendra. He calculated the mathematical specifications required to draw the flag which was included in the-then constitution. He designed multiple historical sites and monuments such as Shahid Gate, Solatee hotel, building of Nepal Academy, Nepal Art Council and many other government buildings. He was involved in the design of Narayanhiti Palace which was designed by Benjamin Polk. He has designed various temples such as Bhaleshwor Mahadev, Vishnu temple in Singapore and Unmata Bhairav temple inside Pashupati temple complex.

He served as the president of Nepal Engineer's Association four times, in the 4th, 17th, 18th and 19th executive council.

He was awarded with National Araniko Award, 2077 by Nepal Academy of Fine Arts in 2020 for his contribution to fine art.

== Personal life ==
He is married to Shashi Rimal. They have three children.
