= Dibyapuri =

Dibyapuri, Nawalparasi, Nepal
- Location in Nepal Dibyapuri, Nawalparasi, Nepal (Nepal)
- Coordinates: 27.71°N 84.21°E
- Country: Nepal
- Zone: Lumbini Zone
- District: Nawalparasi District

Population (1991)
  - Total: 4,968
- Time zone: UTC+5:45 (Nepal Time)

Dibyapuri is a town in Devachuli municipality in the Nawalparasi District of the Lumbini Zone of southern Nepal. It was established on 18 May 2014 by merging existing Devachuli, Dibyapuri, and Pragatinagar village development committees. Divyapuri is a village development committee with Chaudhary Udyog Gram, a gas factory, a steel factory, and many brick factories and cottage industries. Sakala Devi temple, two governmental schools, model health post of Nepal are also here. In the 1991 Nepal census it had a population of 4968 people living in 887 individual households.
