= Pragatinagar =

Pragatinagar प्रगतिनगर
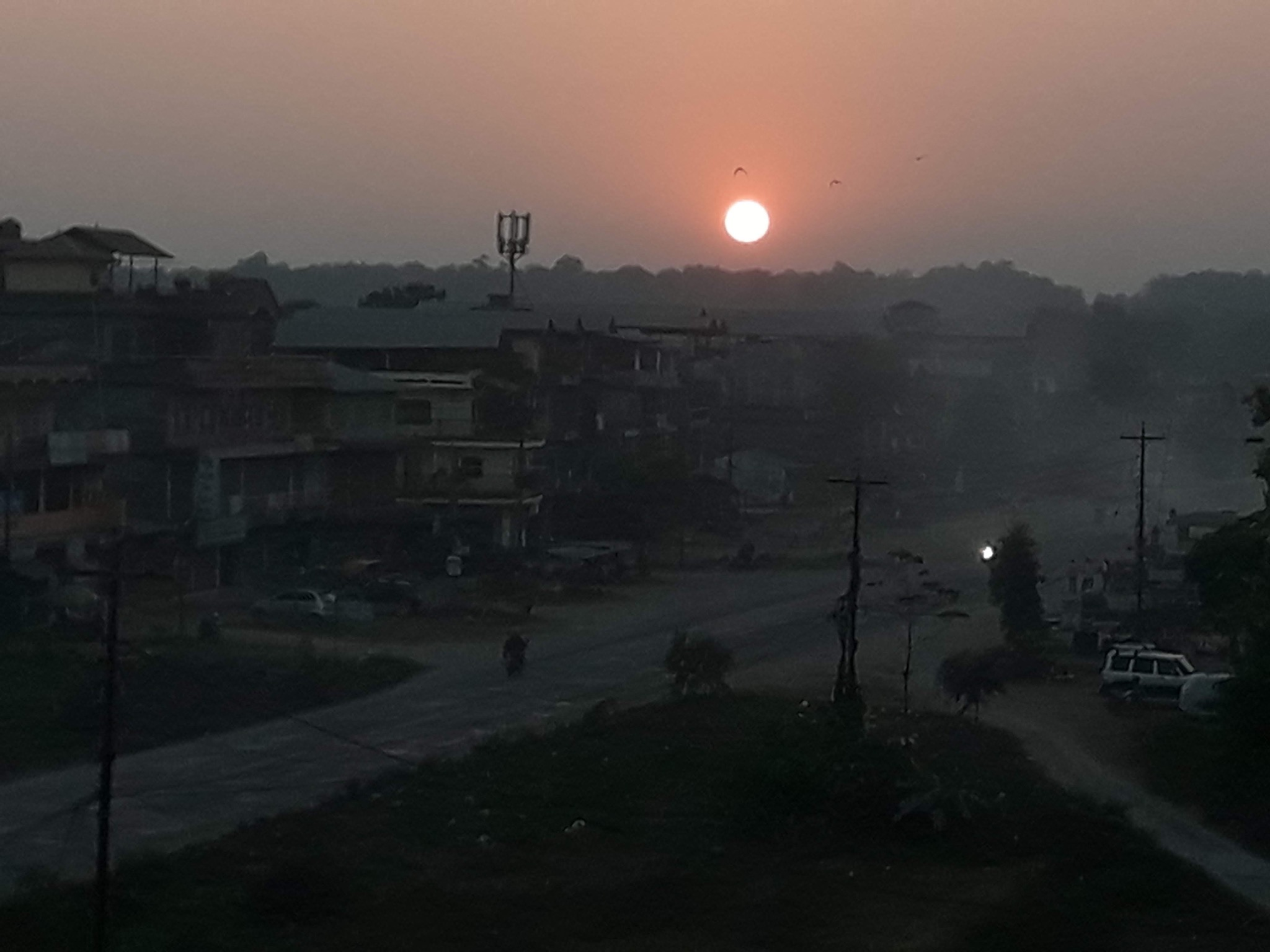
- Early morning in Pragatinagar

- Location in Nepal Pragatinagar (Nepal)
- Coordinates: 27.68°N 84.19°E
- Country: Nepal
- Zone: Lumbini Zone
- District: Nawalparasi District

Population (2001)
  - Total: 11,771
- Time zone: UTC+5:45 (Nepal Time)

Pragatinagar is a town in Devachuli Municipality in Nawalparasi District in the Lumbini Zone of southern Nepal. The municipality was established on 18 May 2014 by merging existing Devachuli, Dibyapuri, Pragatinagar VDCs. At the time of the 2001 Nepal census it had a population of 11,771 people living in the VDC. There are 2690 households as of June 2010 in the VDC with 100 per cent school enrollment, and birth registration. It also has the lowest level of malnutrition and one of the highest level of adult literacy (86%) in Nepal.

Pragatinagar is located about 159 km west of Kathmandu. Mahabharat range can be seen on the north side along with Devchuli and Barchuli Peaks while Narayani river flows on the south side of the VDC. The area is surrounded by two khola's (Nepali: खोला) named Bahulaha Khola in the east and Lokaha Khola(River) in the west. South side is bordered with Pithauli VDC and the Narayani River. Devchuli VDC is located in the north while east of the area is Dibyapuri and west is Shivamandir VDCs, respectively.

Now the main attraction is Daldale. Commerce is active in the area. There are 18 educational institutes and three development banks.

There are number of colonies inside Pragatinagar, including Daldale, Dhaulagiri Tol, Chhatis Ghar(घर), Salghari, Pragatinagar, Prithivi Nagar, Dharapani, Saat Ghar, Kuna Ghat, Gaidi, Gaidi ko Thap, Mukti Kshetra, Laxmipur, prithivinagar, Bishaltar and Bhagawati Tol.
