= Mani Thapa =

Mani Chandra Thapa
- मणिचन्द्र थापा

Minister of Water Supply
- In office 25 December 2020 – 20 May 2021
- President: Bidya Devi Bhandari
- Prime Minister: kp oli
- Preceded by: Bina Magar

Personal details
- Born: Pyuthan
- Party: CPN (UML)
- Spouse: Ranjana Shrestha

Mani Chandra Thapa (Nepali: मणि चन्द्र थापा) is a Nepalese politician and former Minister of Water Supply of Government Of Nepal.

== See also ==
- 2021 split in Communist Party of Nepal (Maoist Centre)
