= Chandragiri Hill (Nepal) =

Hill in Nepal

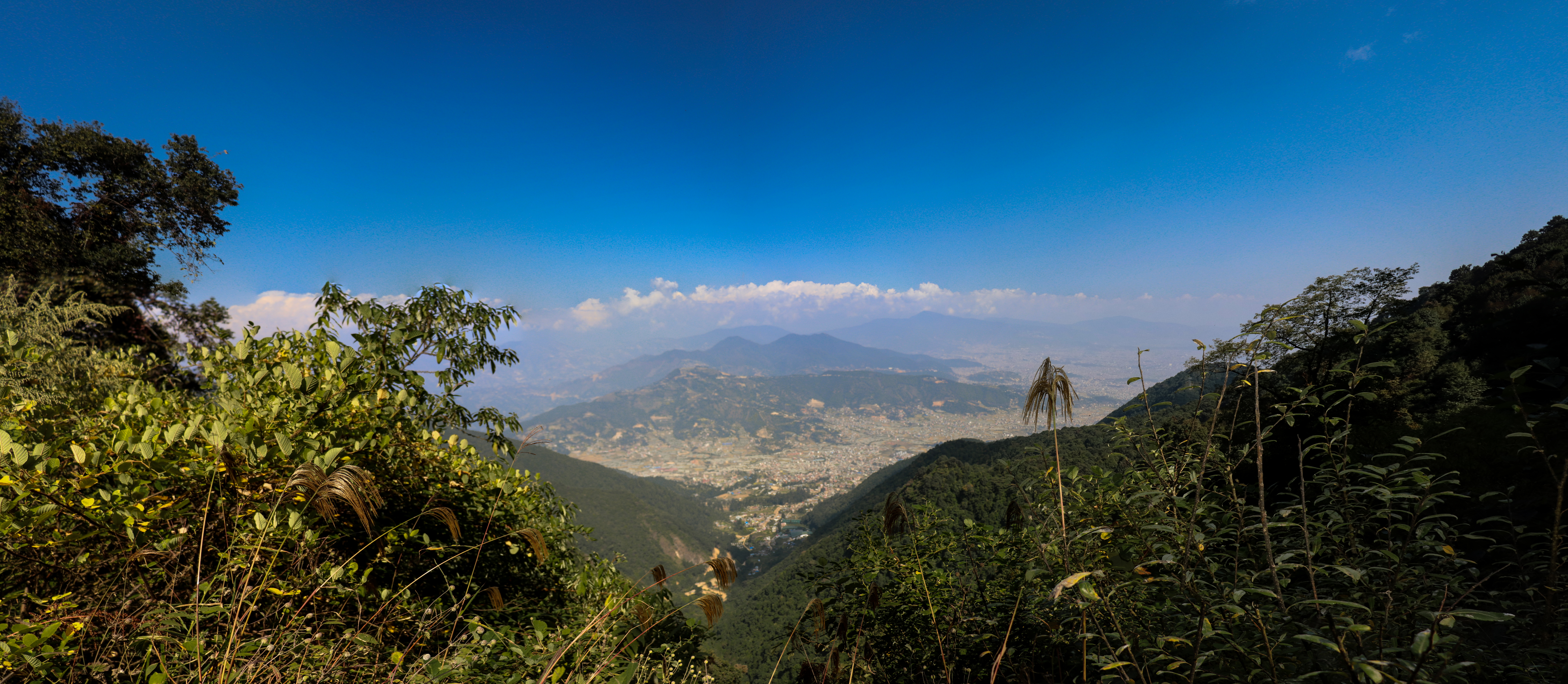
View of Kathmandu from Chandragiri Hill

Chandragiri Hill (Nepali: चन्द्रागिरी) is a hill in Nepal on the south-west side of the Kathmandu Valley. Its peak is 2551 metres above sea level. It is seven kilometres from Thankot and sixteen kilometers from Kathmandu. The Himalayas are visible from the hill, which make it attractive for tourism. There is a cable car system to reach the temple of Bhaleshwor Mahadev on the top of the hill. Chandragiri is where Prithivi Narayan Shah decided to annex the cities of the valley.
