= Chaudhary Group =

Nepalese conglomerate

Chaudhary Group CG Corp Global
- Type: Private
- Industry: Conglomerate
- Founded: 1968; 58 years ago
- Founder: Lunkaran Das Chaudhary
- Headquarters: Chaudhary Group, Kathmandu, Nepal
- Area served: Worldwide
- Key people: Binod Chaudhary (chairman)
- Services: FMCG, Financial Services, Hotels and Resort, Automobile, Education
- Number of employees: ~20,000 (2024)
- Divisions: CG|Foods, CG|Finco, CG|Hotels & Resorts, CG|Education, CG|Electronics, CG|Infra, CG|Realty, CG|Telecom, CG|Communication, CG|Brewery, CG|Beverage, CG|Tobacco, CG|Packaging, Chaudhary Foundation
- Website: www.chaudharygroup.com

Chaudhary Group (CG Corp Global) is a multinational conglomerate headquartered in Nepal. Its businesses include financial services, consumer goods, education, hospitality, energy, consumer electronics, telecommunications, real estate, biotech, and alternative medicine. The group, chaired by billionaire Binod Chaudhary, owns 202 companies in 15 different business verticals across five continents.

== History ==
Towards the end of the eighteenth century, Bhuramull Chaudhary, a Marwari businessman from the modern-day Shekhawati district in the Indian state of Rajasthan, was invited to Nepal at the behest of its erstwhile Rana rulers for business. He sold clothes to the royalty and high-end customers in Kathmandu going from door-to-door and later started his own store in Kathmandu.

Lunkaran Das Chaudhary, laid the foundations of the group and expanded into multi-sector conglomerate. He imported consumer electronics and garments from Japan, South Korea, Europe, and India. Lunkaran started Nepal's first department store, Arun Emporium, in 1968. He exported jute to the US and Europe in the early-1960s when Nepal's trade with the outside world was limited to India.His son, Binod Chaudhary, diversified the conglomerate and expanded its investments across multiple countries throughout the world, ultimately transforming it into a global enterprise.

== Wai Wai Noodles ==
Wai Wai is an international brand of instant noodles produced initially in Thailand by Thai Preserved Food Factory Co. since 1972. Chaudhary Group with technical assistance of the company introduced Wai Wai in Nepal in 1985. The Chaudhary Group built four factories in Nepal and six factories in India for the manufacture and distribution of Wai Wai and other branded instant noodles. CG is expanding with new plants in Nepal, India, Bangladesh, Serbia, Kazakhstan and Saudi Arabia. Along with other noodle brands of India, one segment of Xpress Noodles, a product of CG was banned in the Tamil Nadu state of India in 2015 for a period of three months citing high levels of lead in similar noodle brand known as Maggi. The Assam government had also banned Mimi, another product from CG for one month under the Food Safety and Standard Act 2006. Subsequently, concerned authorities declared the noodles safe as they proved to contain no lead and harmful materials. Wai Wai has a wide presence across the nation with a 28 percent Indian market share.

== Other corporate activities ==
=== Financial services ===
Chaudhary Group has a controlling stake in Nabil Bank, Nepal's largest private-sector commercial bank. The group operates CG Finco Ltd. (remittance company-principal agent of Western Union in Nepal), United Remit (remittance company), United Finance (financial company), and United Insurance Company.

=== Hotels ===
The hospitality arm of Chaudhary Group, CG Hotels and Resorts, operates hotels.

=== Education ===
Chaudhary Group runs Chandbagh schools, Campion schools and colleges, and Delhi Public School in Nepal. Outside Nepal, it has stakes in AEC Education and Malvern House in UK.

=== Electronics ===
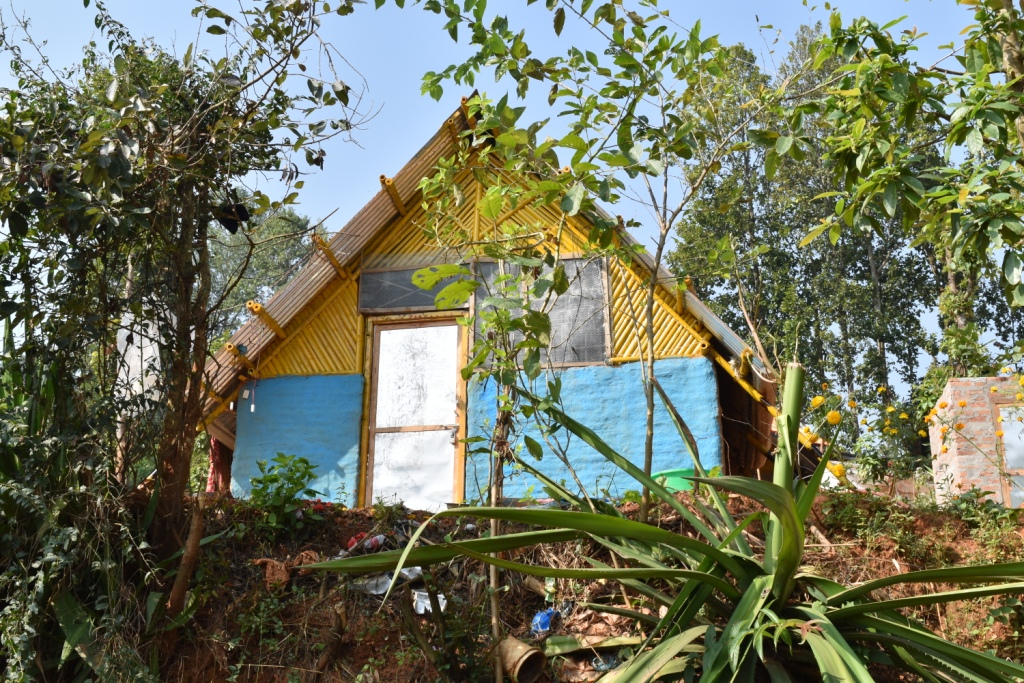
Shelter built by Chaudhary Group in Madevsthan of Kavre District, approximately 60 km (37 mi) east of Kathmandu

The group assembles and distributes consumer electronics (smartphones, refrigerators, washing machines, microwave ovens, TVs, vacuum cleaners, and various other products) across Nepal. It imports and distributes other brands such as TCL, Intex, Godrej, and Kelvinator. The best-known brand that the group deals in is LG Corporation of South Korea.

=== Telecoms ===
CG Group has signed a deal worth $1 million with China's Huawei to launch 4G services in Nepal.

Miss Universe Nepal 2020

For the year 2020, CG Corp took the responsibility of organizing the annual beauty pageant competition Miss Universe Nepal 2020 to select Nepali Delegate to Miss Universe, the most prestigious beauty pageant in the world. The event proved to be inclusive and a huge success.

== Philanthropy ==
The Chaudhary Foundation assisted in building 10,000 transitional shelters for survivors of the April 2015 Nepal earthquake. It also committed to build 100 schools for those damaged in the earthquake. The foundation has handed over 2500 shelters and 40 school buildings. Due to government norms, the foundation is now moving away from transitional shelter to permanent housing and working on building a "model village".

== Controversy ==
Chaudhary Group and its Chairman Binod Chaudhary have faced accusations of tax evasion, financial irregularities, and alleged monopolistic practices within certain sectors. Notably, he has established prominent relationships with political entities in power, including Prince Dhirendra during the monarchy rule in Nepal, and later affiliations with CPN-UML and Nepali Congress after Nepal transitioned into a republic.
One significant controversy involves the alleged privatization of land belonging to the Bansbari Shoe Factory, a government entity. Investigations revealed that Chaudhary's company took control of shares allocated to the public during the privatization process, subsequently gaining control of the land.
Additionally, one of Chaudhary Group's subsidiaries, Apollo Steel Industries, faced accusations of land grabbing in Satungal, Kathmandu. Local communities have accused the company of usurping a public road, which is currently fenced off and part of the premises housing CG Electronics. This dispute dates back to 1987 and the road in question still remains closed to the public.
Furthermore, Chaudhary's investment in Hotel Summit has been marred by allegations of procedural lapses and neglect regarding neighboring properties. Investigations revealed the company's failure to obtain approval from local authorities for construction and circumvention of mandatory Environmental Impact Assessments (EIA).
He was also named in the Pandora Papers leak in 2021. While his son denies allegations, stating compliance with the law, investigations suggest the use of loopholes to circumvent Nepal's legal restrictions on owning foreign assets and capital controls for global business expansion. Chaudhary himself has alluded to such practices in his autobiography.
