= People's Progressive Party (Nepal) =

Social democratic party in Nepal

People's Progressive Party जनता प्रगतिशील पार्टी
- Abbreviation: PPP
- President: Hridayesh Tripathi
- Senior vice-president: Dr. Shivaji Yadav
- General Secretary: Ishwar Dayal Mishra; Dr. Bharat Kumar Thapa
- Founder: Hridayesh Tripathi
- Founded: 14 December 2021; 4 years ago
- Split from: CPN (UML)
- Merged into: Loktantrik Samajwadi Party, Nepal
- Headquarters: Kathmandu
- Membership: 25,000
- Ideology: Social democracy Agrarianism
- Political position: Centre-left
- Colours
- House of Representatives: 0 / 275
- Lumbini Provincial Assembly: 0 / 87
- Local governments: 1 / 753 Mayor/Chairperson

Election symbol
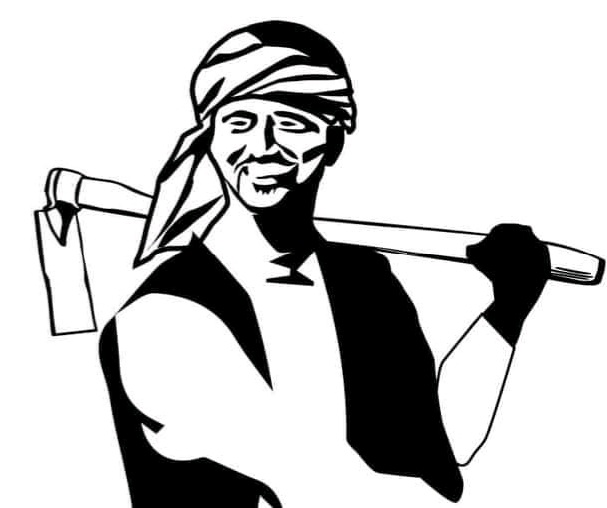

The People's Progressive Party (Nepali: जनता प्रगतिशील पार्टी) is a political party in Nepal. Although the party's primary base is in the Terai Madhesh area of Madhesh and Lumbini provinces, it has tried to expand to a pan-Nepalese base. The party later merged into Loktantrik Samajwadi Party, Nepal.

The party's formation was formally announced on 14 December 2021. Hridayesh Tripathi is the coordinator of the party.

== History ==
=== 2017 elections ===
As of August 2021, the party members had filled their candidacy as an independent political group in the 2017 Nepalese general election. They used sun as their election symbol, as a part of agreement/alliance between CPN (UML) and the group. Brijesh Kumar Gupta And Hridayesh Tripathi won as members of the House of Representatives. Similarly, Ajay Shahi and Dharma Lal Shrivastava won as candidate in the provincial assembly elections to the Provincial Assembly of Lumbini Province. However Ishwar Dayal Mishra and Pashupati Dayal Mishra couldn't manage to win the election.

The party was expected to get registered much earlier while it was reported that the process had already started in July. The party got registered in December before the 2022 National Assembly elections.

=== Formation and registration at Election Commission ===
The party formation was declared on 14 December 2021 amidst a press conference at Everest Hotel, Kathmandu. Former speaker of House of Representatives Daman Nath Dhungana, MP Brijesh Kumar Gupta, economist Rameshwar Khanal and Tul Narayan Sah joined newly announced the party while they were also present during the party declaration.

On 11 February 2021, the party was registered at Election Commission with central committee with thirty members. Hridayesh Tripathi from Lumbini Province was declared president, Shivajee Yadav from Madhesh Province was declared senior vice president of the party. The party appointed three vice presidents Harka Lal Singh Rajbanshi (from Province No. 1), Mohammand Shabir Hussain (from Madhesh Province) and Farhan Akwal Kha (from Lumbini Province). They party in a statement said that it had tried to keep people from all province in party portfolio. Former minister Ishwar Dayal Mishra and Bharat Kumar Thapa were appointed general secretary of the party while thirty three membered central committee was declared.

=== Party expansion and first election ===
The party went organization development mainly in Terai belt of Lumbini province. Even within the province, the party was centred to Kapilvastu, Rupandehi and Parasi district. The party won both chairman and deputy chairman post in Marchabari rural municipality. The party emerged as first runner up in several local levels including Pratappur rural municipality while winning several posts in various local levels. As a result, the party was able to decline the vote bank of CPN (UML) and traditional vote bank of Janata Samajwadi Party and Loktantrik Samajwadi Party in Lumbini province.

== Ideology ==
The party presented a 17-point commitment and its view on social national issues on the same day. The party remains close to left but equally committed to democracy. The party document presents the farmers as the base of the party. The party commitment claims the party of being committed to federalism, nationalism while against the Ultranationalism.

== Electoral performance ==
=== Legislative elections ===
Election	Leader	Seats contested	Constituency votes			Party list votes			Seats		Position
Election	Leader	Seats contested	No.	%	% change	No.	%	% change	No.	+/-	Position
House of Representatives election
2017	Hridayesh Tripathi	4/165	104,020	1.04					2 / 275		Government
Lumbini Provincial Assembly election
2017	Hridayesh Tripathi	6/52	69,013	3.59					2 / 87		Government

=== Local election ===
Election	Leader(s)	Seats		Local level
Election	Leader(s)	#	+/-	Local level
2022	Hridayesh Tripathi	1 / 753	+1	Marchawari Rural Municipality

== Presence in legislature ==
=== Federal parliament ===
Parliament	Parliamentary Party Leader	Position	Pratinidhi Sabha	Rastriya Sabha
1st Federal Parliament of Nepal	Hridayesh Tripathi	7th	2 / 275	0 / 59

=== Provincial Assemblies ===
Parliament	Parliamentary Party Leader	Position	Seats	Present as
Provincial Assembly of Lumbini Province	Ajay Shahi	5th	2 / 87	Coalition government with Nepali Congress

== List of Members of Parliament ==
List of Pratinidhi Sabha members from People's Progressive Party

No.	Name	Constituency	Appointment date	Retirement date
1.	Hridayesh Tripathi	Nawalparasi West 1	2017	2021
2.	Brijesh Kumar Gupta	Kapilvastu 2	2017	2021

== Leadership ==
=== Party portfolios ===
No.	Portfolio	Office holder	Terms in Office		
No.	Portfolio	Office holder	Start	End	Tenure
1	President	Hridayesh Tripathi	14 December 2021	Incumbent	4 years, 300 days
2	Senior vice president	Shivaji Yadav	11 February 2021	Incumbent	4 years, 241 days
3	General Secretary	Ishwar Dayal Mishra	11 February 2021	Incumbent	4 years, 241 days
3	General Secretary	Bharat Kumar Thapa	11 February 2021	Incumbent	4 years, 241 days
4	Vice President	Harka Lal Singh Rajbanshi	11 February 2021	Incumbent	4 years, 241 days
4	Vice President	Mohammand Shabir Hussain	11 February 2021	Incumbent	4 years, 241 days
4	Vice President	Farhan Ekwal Kha	11 February 2021	Incumbent	4 years, 241 days

== See also ==
- Loktantrik Samajwadi Party, Nepal
