= Shivajee Yadav =

Nepali politician

Dr Shivajee Yadav
- डा. शिवजी यादव
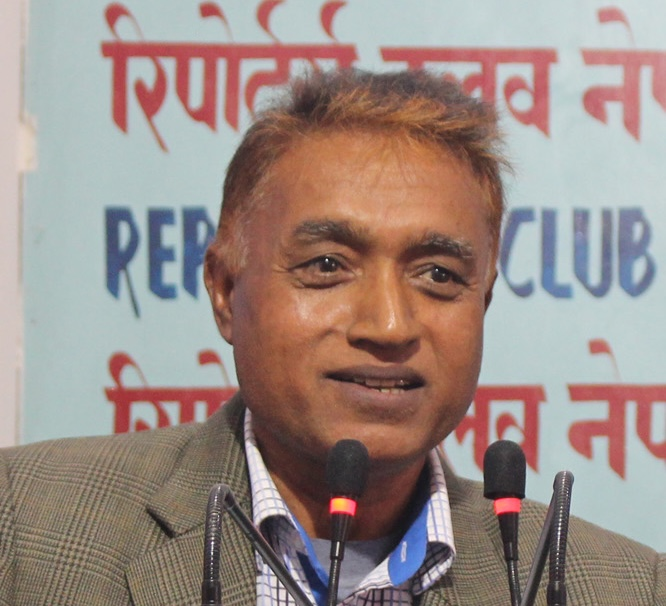

Senior vice-president of People's Progressive Party
- Incumbent
- Assumed office 2022
- President: Hridayesh Tripathi
- Preceded by: Position established

Member of Nepalese Constituent Assembly
- In office 2013–2017
- Prime Minister: Sushil Koirala
- Constituency: Proportional list

Personal details
- Born: Mahottari, Nepal
- Party: People's Progressive Party (2022-present)
- Other party: Nepal Communist Party (2021-2021)
- Spouse: Gauri Kumari
- Parent(s): Brijlal Yadav, Raso Yadav

Shivajee Yadav (Nepali: शिवजी यादव) is a Nepalese politician and a member of People's Progressive Party. He is the current senior vice president of the party.

In the 2013 Constituent Assembly election he was elected to the constituent assembly from proportional list of the party.
