= Bhaleshwor Mahadev =

Hindu temple in Nepal

Bhaleshwor Mahadev temple
- भालेश्वर महादेव

- Location within Kathmandu Location within Bagmati Province Location within Nepal

Religion
- Affiliation: Hinduism
- District: Kathmandu
- Province: Bagmati
- Deity: Shiva
- Festivals: Shivaratri, Mondays during the month of Shrawan

Location
- Location: Chandragiri Hill
- Country: Nepal
- Coordinates: 27.6661°N 85.2054°E

Architecture
- Architect: Shankar Nath Rimal
- Type: Pagoda
- Elevation: 2,551 m (8,369 ft)

Bhaleshwor Mahadev (Nepali: भालेश्वर महादेव) is a Hindu temple located in Chandragiri hill in south-west side of Kathmandu Valley. It is dedicated to Lord Shiva. It is located at the altitude of 2551 meters above sea level. The temple was built by Chandragiri Hills on the historic and religious site. The temple was designed by the architect Shankar Nath Rimal. The temple is connected to the Kathmandu valley by a cable car.

== Mythological significance ==
It is believed that Sati Devi, first consort of Shiva, sacrificed her own life at Daksha Prajapati’s yagna after Daksha insulted Shiva in front of other deities. Shiva, enraged with Sati Devi's death, carried her dead body on his back and walked across the world in rage. Shiva, blinded by rage, did not realize that Sati Devi’s decaying body was falling apart. Sati Devi's body parts fell down to different parts of the world. Pilgrimages were later established at these sites. Bhaleshwor Mahadev temple is believed to have been built at one of these sites, where Sati Devi's forehead ('Bhala') had fallen.

In Nepal Bhasa the hill is known as Gon:ga Danda (it is converted its name from Gon:ga means bhalay (Nepali) and Danda means hills). It is also known as Ichheshwor Mahadev.

== Historical significance ==
The hill on which the temple is situated is related to the unification of Nepal campaign. On his way back to Gorkha from his in-laws in Makwanpur, Prithvi Narayan Shah had planned to make Kathmandu Valley the capital of a unified Nepal for the first time from Chandragiri hill.

== Temple complex ==
The temple complex also consists of idols of multiple Hindu gods and goddesses. There is a view tower, restaurant, food stalls, gift stores, banquet, 3D hall as well as an amusement park for children near the temple on the hill.

== Gallery ==
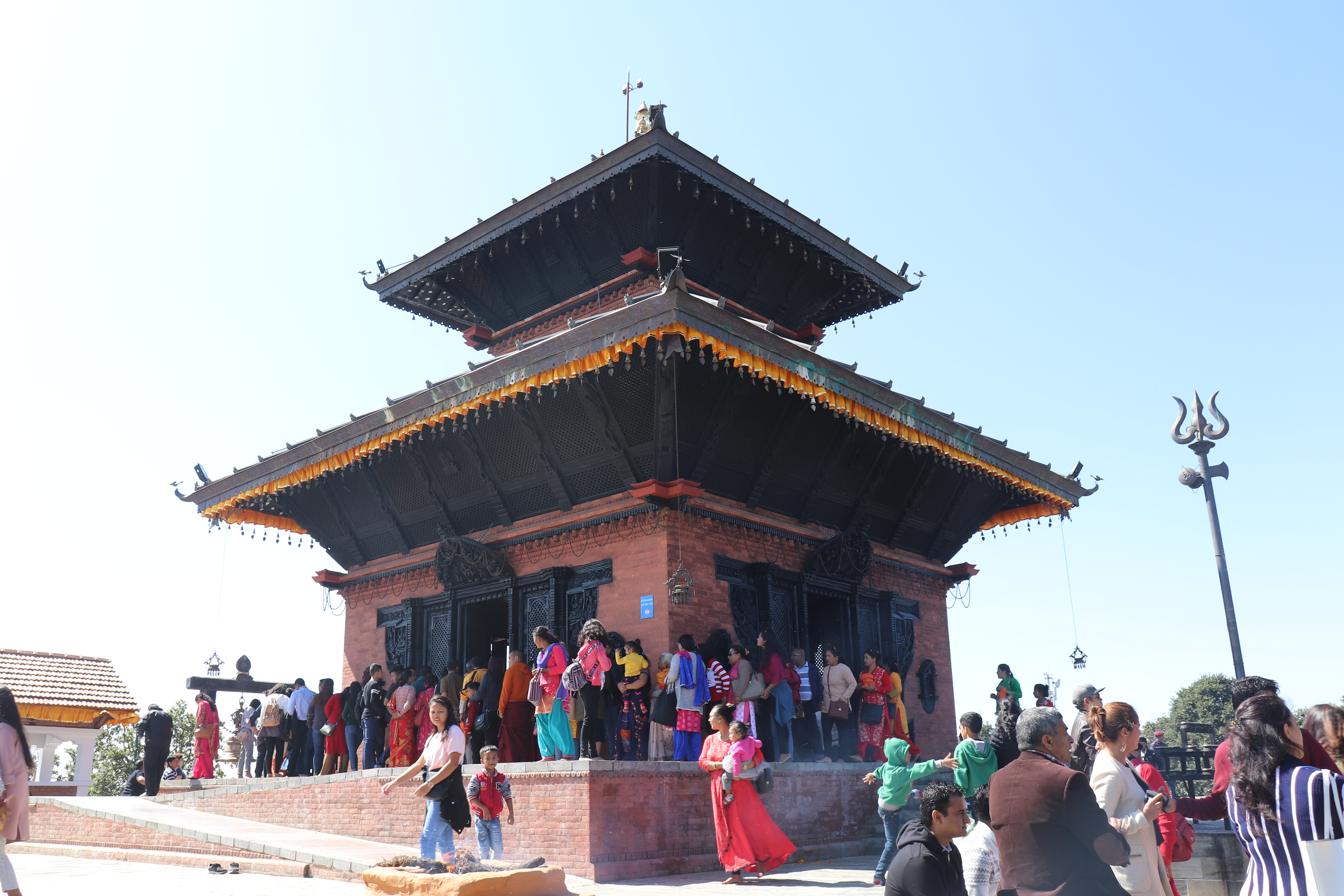
Devotees around the temple

Panoramic view of the temple area

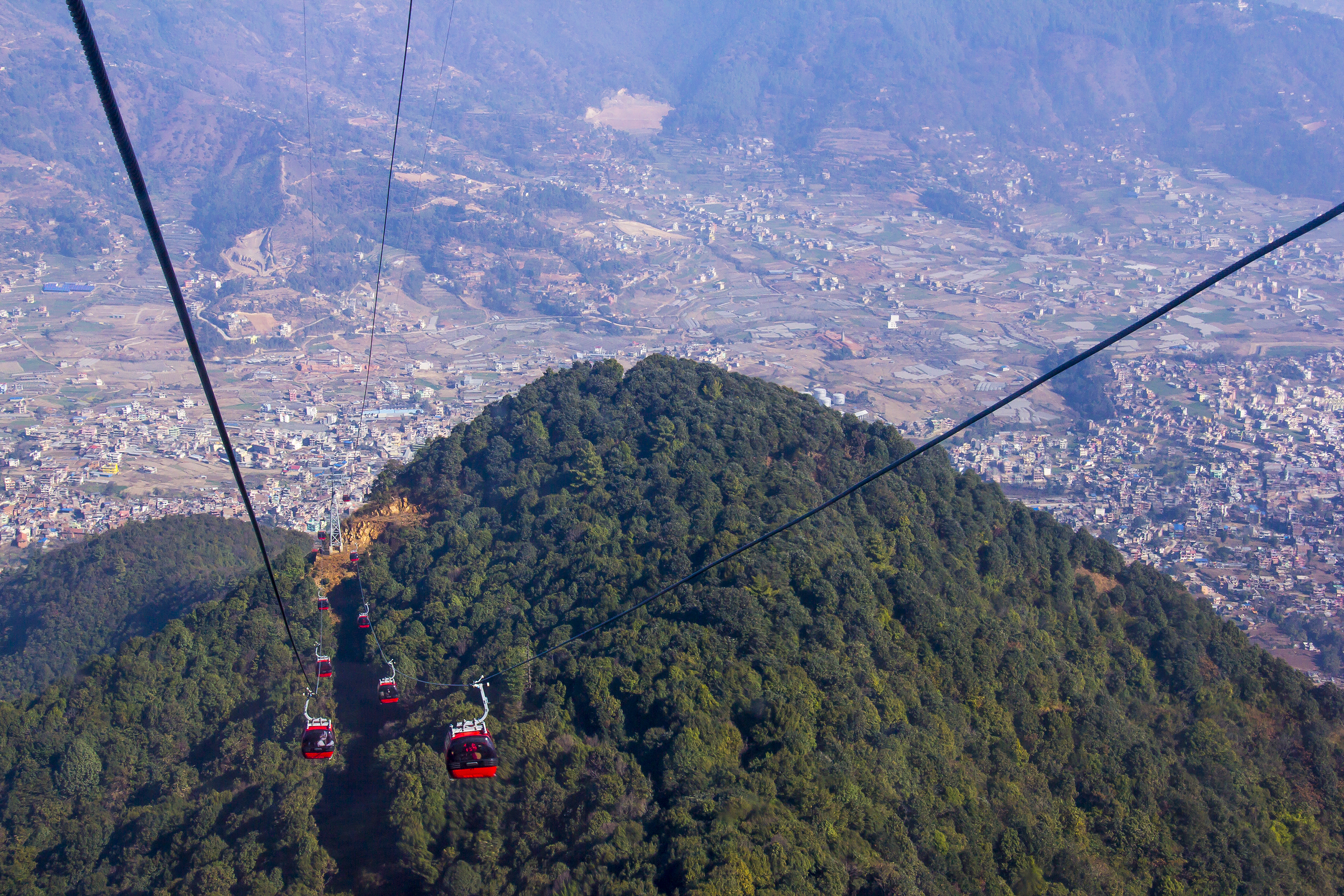
Cable car from the valley to the hill

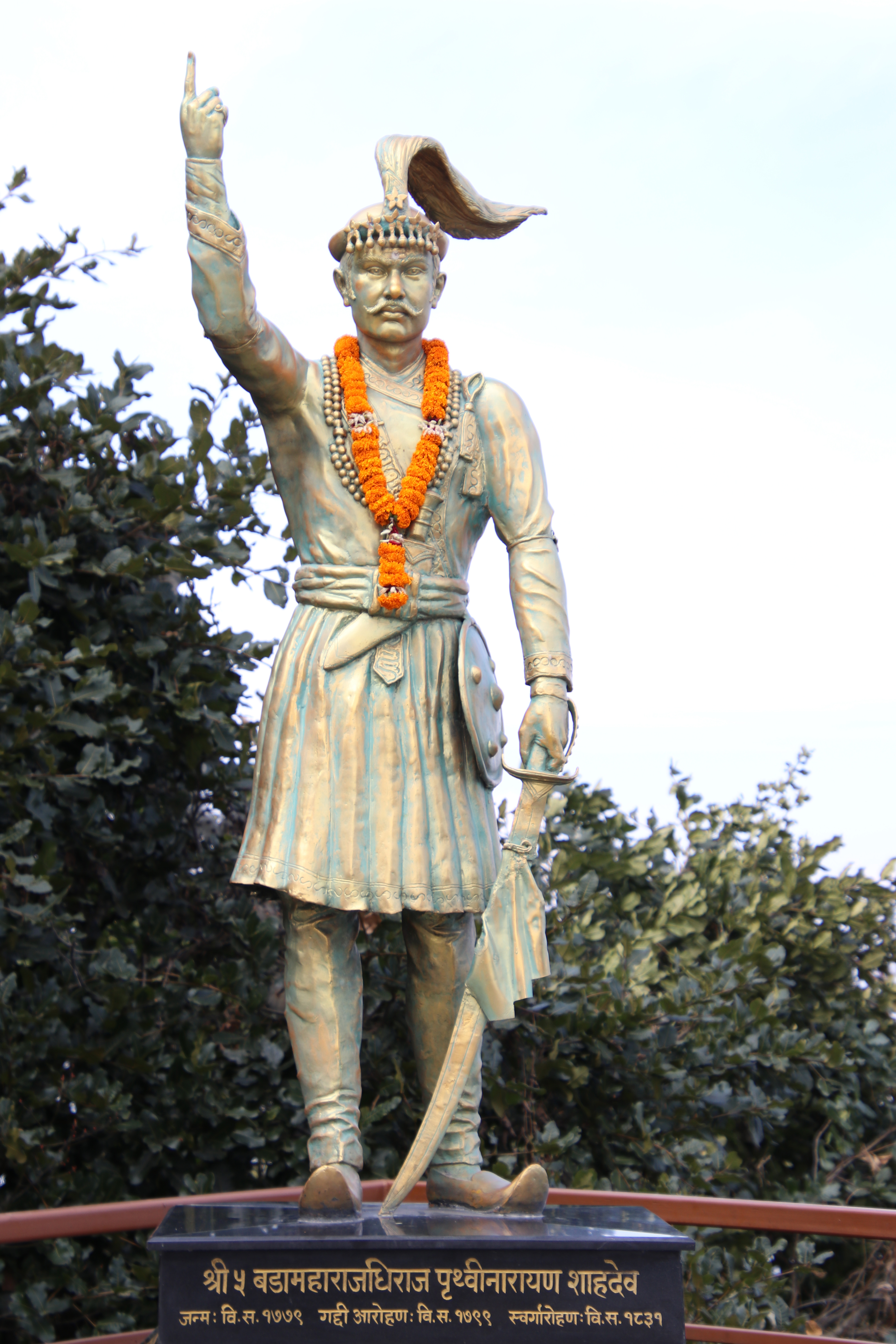
Statue of Prithvi Narayan Shah located behind the temple

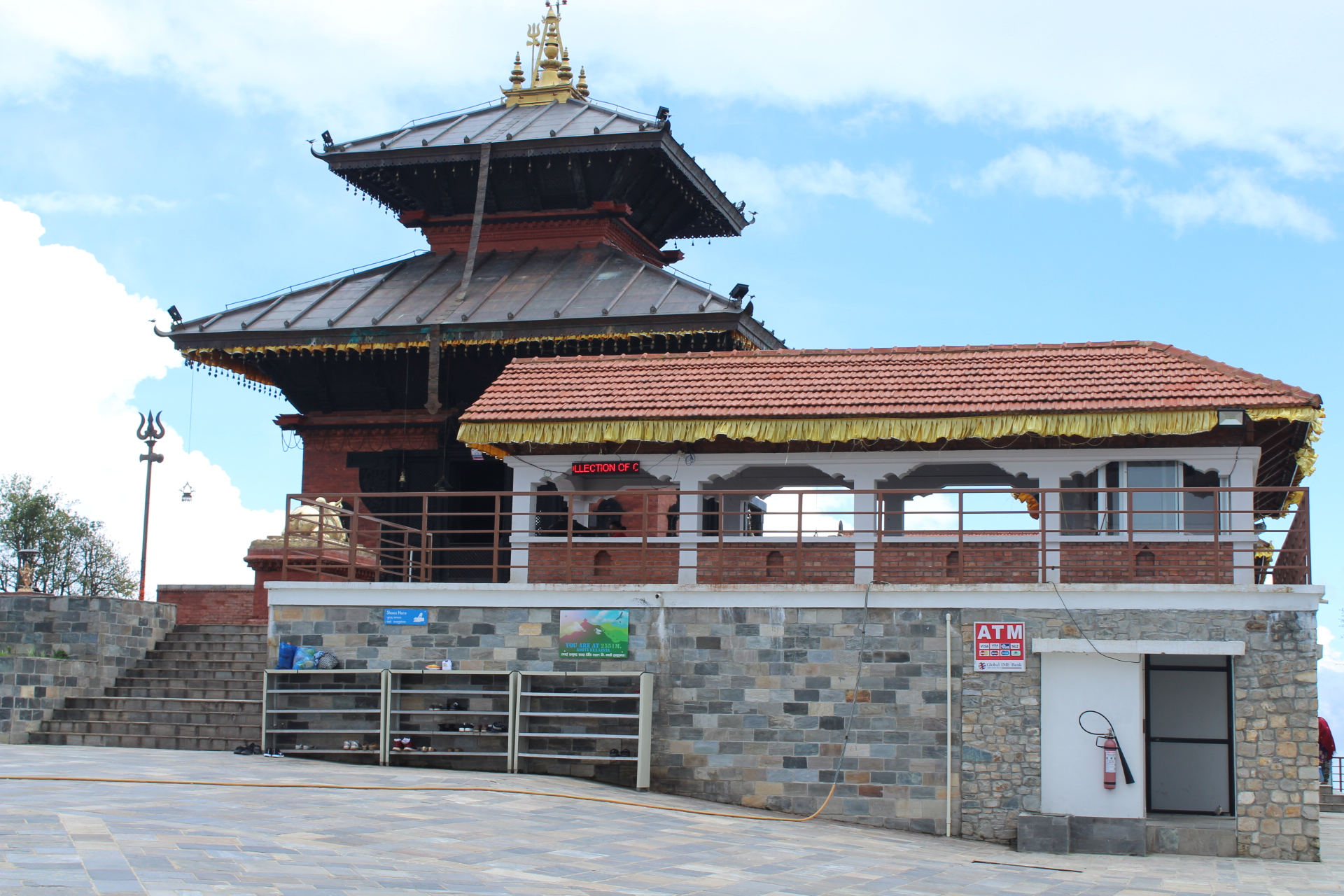
Front view of the temple

== See also ==
- Gokarneshwor Mahadev temple
- Doleshwor Mahadeva Temple
- Kailashnath Mahadev Statue
