= Hridayesh Tripathi =

Nepalese politician

- हृदयेश त्रिपाठी

Chairman of People's Progressive Party
- Incumbent
- Assumed office 14 December 2021
- Preceded by: Position created

Minister of Industry, Commerce and Supplies
- In office 2006–2008
- President: Gyanendra of Nepal
- Prime Minister: Girija Prasad Koirala

Minister of Law, Justice and Parliamentary Affairs
- In office 4 September 2011 – 14 March 2013
- President: Ram Baran Yadav
- Prime Minister: Baburam Bhattarai

Minister of Federal Affairs and General Administration
- In office 21 November 2019 – 25 December 2020
- President: Bidhya Devi Bhandari
- Prime Minister: KP Oli
- Preceded by: Lal Babu Pandit

Minister of Health and Population
- In office 25 December 2020 – 4 June 2021
- President: Bidhya Devi Bhandari
- Prime Minister: KP Sharma Oli
- Preceded by: Bhanu Bhakta Dhakal
- Succeeded by: Birodh Khatiwada

Member of Parliament, Pratinidhi Sabha
- In office 4 March 2018 – 18 September 2022
- Constituency: Nawalparasi West 1
- In office May 1991 – May 2002
- Constituency: Nawalparasi 3

Member of Constituent Assembly
- In office 28 May 2008 – 28 May 2012
- Constituency: Nawalparasi 6

Personal details
- Born: 18 June 1959 (age 66) Parsauni, Nawalparasi, Nepal
- Party: People's Progressive Party
- Other political affiliations: Nepal Sadbhawana Party(1991-2006); Terai Madhesh Loktantrik Party(2007-2017); CPN (UML)(2017-2021)

Hridayesh Tripathi (Nepali: हृदयेश त्रिपाठी) is a Nepalese politician, from the People's Progressive Party. He is also the current chairman of the party.

A former Minister of Health and Population, Tripathi has worked several terms as minister under the government of Nepali Congress and CPN (UML).

== Early life and education ==
Tripathi was born in Nawalparasi to Harishankar Triphati and Kunti Devi. He completed his secondary education in Palpa and studied political science at the Institute of Oriental Studies in the Soviet Union.

== Political career ==
He started his political career in Communist Party of Nepal (Rayamajhi). He unsuccessfully contested the 1986 Rastriya Panchayat elections. After the non-partisan panchayat system was removed and democracy was re-established in Nepal by the 1990 Nepalese revolution, Triphathi joined the Nepal Sadbhawana Party. He was elected to the House of Representatives from Nawalparasi 3 in the 1991 elections and retained his seat in the 1994 and 1999 elections.

In the wake of the Madhesh movement in 2007, Tripathi resigned from the government of Girija Prasad Koirala and formed the Terai Madhesh Loktantrik Party with Mahantha Thakur. He was elected to the 1st Nepalese Constituent Assembly in the 2008 elections from Nawalparasi 6 but failed to retain his seat in the 2013 elections.

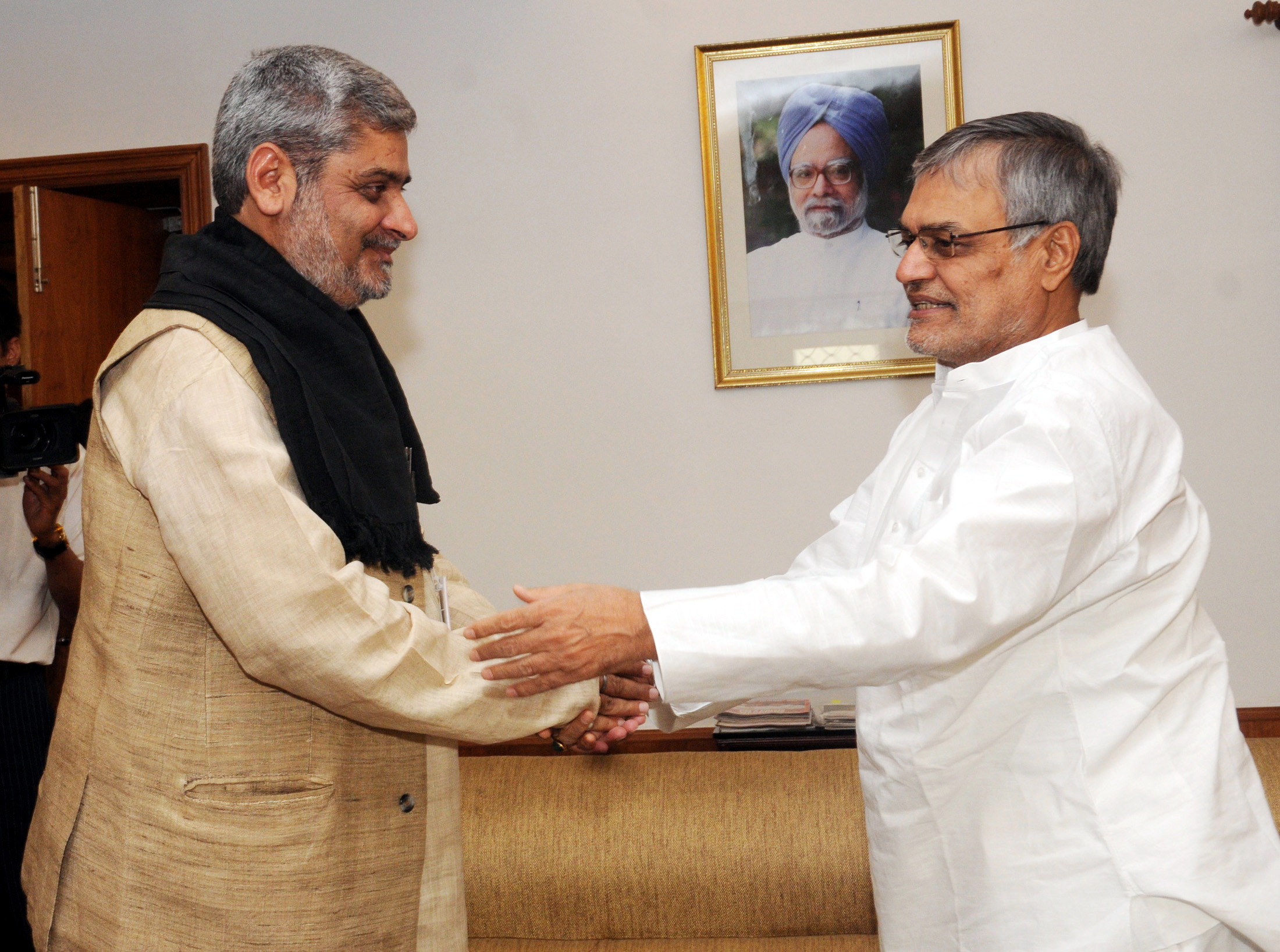
Hridayesh Tripathi meeting with Union Minister for Road Transport and Highways, Dr. C.P. Joshi, to discuss issues regarding roads and infrastructure in Nepal, in New Delhi on October 21, 2011

In 2017, he quit the Rastriya Janata Party Nepal and formed the Independent Political Group that contested the 2017 elections under the election symbol of CPN (Unified Marxist–Leninist). He was elected to the House of Representatives from Nawalparasi West 1 and was a member of the CPN (UML) parliamentary party.

On 14 December 2021, he announced the formation of People's Progressive Party. He emphasized the need of a party concentrated towards agrarianism, ideological debate and addressing the demands of Madhesh and Tharuhat region which were not included in constitution.

== Personal life ==
Tripathi is married to Shobha Tripathi with whom he has two daughters and a son.

== Electoral history ==
Year	Office	Electorate	Party	Main opponent	Votes for Tripathi			Result
Year	Office	Electorate	Party	Main opponent	Total	%	P.	Result
1991	Representative	Nawalparasi 3	Nepal Sadbhawana Party		16,707	41.8%	1st	Won
1994	Representative	Nawalparasi 3	Nepal Sadbhawana Party	Triyugi Narayan Chaudhari	15,297	35.7%	1st	Won
1999	Representative	Nawalparasi 3	Nepal Sadbhawana Party	Triyugi Narayan Chaudhari	18,133	37.0%	1st	Won
2008	Constituent	Nawalparasi 6	Terai Madhesh Loktantrik Party	Devkaran Prasad Kalwar	10,029	25.0%	1st	Won
2013	Constituent	Nawalparasi 6	Terai Madhesh Loktantrik Party	Devkaran Prasad Kalwar	8,424	23.1%	2nd	Lost
2017	Representative	Nawalparasi West 1	CPN (Unified Marxist–Leninist)	Devkaran Prasad Kalwar	38,592	51.0%	1st	Won
2017	Representative	Nawalparasi West 1	People's Progressive Party (Nepal)	Binod Chaudhary	22,328	31.0%	2nd	Lost

== See also ==
- People's Progressive Party
- Terai Madhesh Loktantrik Party
