= List of massacres in Nepal =

The following is a list of massacres that have occurred in Nepal (numbers may be approximate):

Name	Date	Nepali Date(B.S)	Location	Deaths	Notes
1806 Bhandarkhal massacre	25 April 1806	1863	Kathmandu	93	Spurred by the assassination of King Rana Bahadur Shah, it established Bhimsen Thapa as the prime minister of Nepal.
1843 Pande family massacre or Parva	18 April 1843		Kathmandu	30-40	Spurred by the investigation of the death of Bhimsen Thapa after the return of Mathbar Singh Thapa from 6 years in exile. Eliminated all Kala Pande faction including Rana Jang Pande, Karbir Pande and their brothers.
Kot massacre	19 September 1846	1903 Bhadra 32	Palace Armory (the Kot), Kathmandu	55	Spurred by the assassination of general Gagan Singh Bhandari, it established the dictatorship of Jung Bahadur and the Rana autocracy.
1846 Bhandarkhal massacre	1846	1903 Kartik	Bhandarkhal, Kathmandu	23	Eliminated all opposition of Jung Bahadur and exiled the then Queen Rajya Laxmi.
Alau massacre	July 1847	1904	Alau, Birgunj	50	Imprisonment of King Rajendra in Bhaktapur; led to the international recognition of his son Surendra Bikram Shah as the King of Nepal.
Massacre of 1882	January 1882	1938	Kathmandu	20	Eliminated all opposition to the rule of Ranodip Singh Kunwar and Dhir Shumsher.
Massacre of 1885	November 1885	1942	Kathmandu	23	Murder of the ruling Prime Minister Ranodip Singh, who was succeeded by Bir Shumsher. Establishment of the rule of Shumsher Ranas in Nepal; sons of Jung Bahadur either killed or exiled to China.
Chhintang massacre	November 13, 1979	2036/7/27	Chhintang	15	Sixteen people were killed by the government of Nepal at Chhintang for demanding democracy. They were accused of promoting communist ideologies
1980 Namita Sunita murder incident	1980		Pokhara	4	Three girls, Namita Bhandari, Sunita Bhandari and Neera Parajuli, were raped and murdered in Pokhara with a single witness. The witness, Churamani Adhikari, later committed suicide
1985 Nepal bombings	20 June 1985	2042/3/6	Kathmandu, Jhapa, Pokhara, Biratnagar, Janakpur, Birgunj, Mahendranagar, Nepalganj, Bhairahawa Airport	8	Bombs explode in several cities, including the capitol Kathmandu, as well as in Jhapa, Pokhara, Biratnagar, Janakpur, Birgunj, Mahendranagar, Nepalganj and at Bhairahawa Airport. Nepal Janabadi Morcha claimed responsibility.
Nepalese royal massacre	1 June 2001	2058 Jestha 19	Narayanhity Royal Palace, Durbar Marg, Kathmandu	10	Wiped out the family of King Birendra and eventually led to the end of monarchy in Nepal.
Badarmude bus explosion	6 June 2005	2062/2/24	Badarmude village, Chitwan district	38 - 53	A bomb detonated near a bus while passing across a bridge, causing the bridge to collapse.
Nagarkot massacre	December 14, 2005	2062/8/29	Chihandanda near Nagarkot	12 (including the perpetrator)	Off-duty RNA sergeant Basudev Thapa indiscriminately shot at villagers, celebrating at the temple, with an L1A1 SLR, killing 11 and injuring 19 more, before he shot and killed himself
Gaur massacre	21 March 2007	2063/12/7	Gaur, Rautahat	27	Maoists killed by cadres of Madeshi Janadhikar Forum.
2015 Tikapur massacre	24 August 2015	2072 Bhadra 7	Tikapur, kailali	8	Protests against Constitution of Nepal by Tharuhat Struggle Community which led to a clash with security officials and consequent arrest of Resham Chaudhary.
May 2019 Kathmandu bombings	26 May 2019	2076 Jesth 12	Kathmandu	4	Three separate accidental explosions by a splinter group of former Maoist rebels
2025 Nepalese Gen Z protests	8-9 September 2019	23-24 Bhadra 2082	Different Districts of Nepal with Kathmandu being the epicenter.	75	Protests broke out against corruption and the social media ban in Nepal on September 8. The peaceful protest escalated when the protesters tried entering the premises of the International Convention Centre, Nepal leading to the police opening fire and killing 17 people and 2 more on the same day in city of Itahari. The next day, a violent uprising against the government was done by the people of Nepal, resulting in 75 deaths, including 3 police officers and 10 prisoners. The rest of the deaths were protestors, as well as looters caught in building fires.
