= Suresh Kumar Chaudhary =

Nepalese politician

Honourable Suresh Kumar Chaudhary
- सुरेश कुमार चौधरी

Member of Parliament, Pratinidhi Sabha
- Incumbent
- Assumed office 26 March 2026
- Preceded by: Surya Prasad Dhakal
- Constituency: Banke 1

Personal details
- Born: 2 October 1969 (age 56) Ghorahi, Dang, Nepal
- Citizenship: Nepalese
- Party: Rastriya Swatantra Party (2025 – present)
- Other political affiliations: CPN (UML); CPN (Maoist Center); Nagrik Unmukti Party
- Parents: Baru Lal Chaudhary (father); Tili Chaudhary (mother)
- Profession: Politician

Suresh Kumar Chaudhary (Nepali: सुरेश कुमार चौधरी) is a Nepalese politician serving as a member of parliament from the Rastriya Swatantra Party. He is the member of the 7th Pratinidhi Sabha elected from Banke 1 in 2026 Nepalese General Election securing 32,792 votes and defeating his closest contender Narayan Prasad Goudel of the Nepali Congress.

He started his political journey as a student leader by joining CPN (UML); later, he joined CPN (Maoist Center). After the Tikapur incident, he joined Nagrik Unmukti Party of Resham Lal Chaudhary. He also contested the 2022 Nepalese General Election as a candidate of the Nagrik Unmukti Party in the Banke 1 constituency but placed third. He entered to Rastriya Swatantra Party in December 2025, along senior vice president of Nagrik Unmukti Party's Damodar Pandit.

== Early and personal life ==
Suresh Kumar Chaudhary was born in Ghorahi, Dang, Nepal on 2 October 1969. He was born into a Tharu family to Baru Lal Chaudhary and Tili Chaudhary. He is a permanent resident of Ghorahi but moved with his family to Motipur, Bardiya in 1985.

He studied up to high school, an academic diploma equivalent to 12th grade. Chaudhary is married to Devi Chaudhary, a housewife.

== Electoral performance ==
Election	Year	Constituency	Contested for	Political party	Result	Votes	% of votes	Ref.
Nepal general election	2022	Banke 1	Pratinidhi Sabha member	Nagrik Unmukti Party	Lost	11,465	16.19%	
Nepal general election	2026	Banke 1	Pratinidhi Sabha member	Rastriya Swatantra Party	Won	32,792	46.82%	
