= KP Khanal =

Nepalese politician and social activist

- केपी खनाल
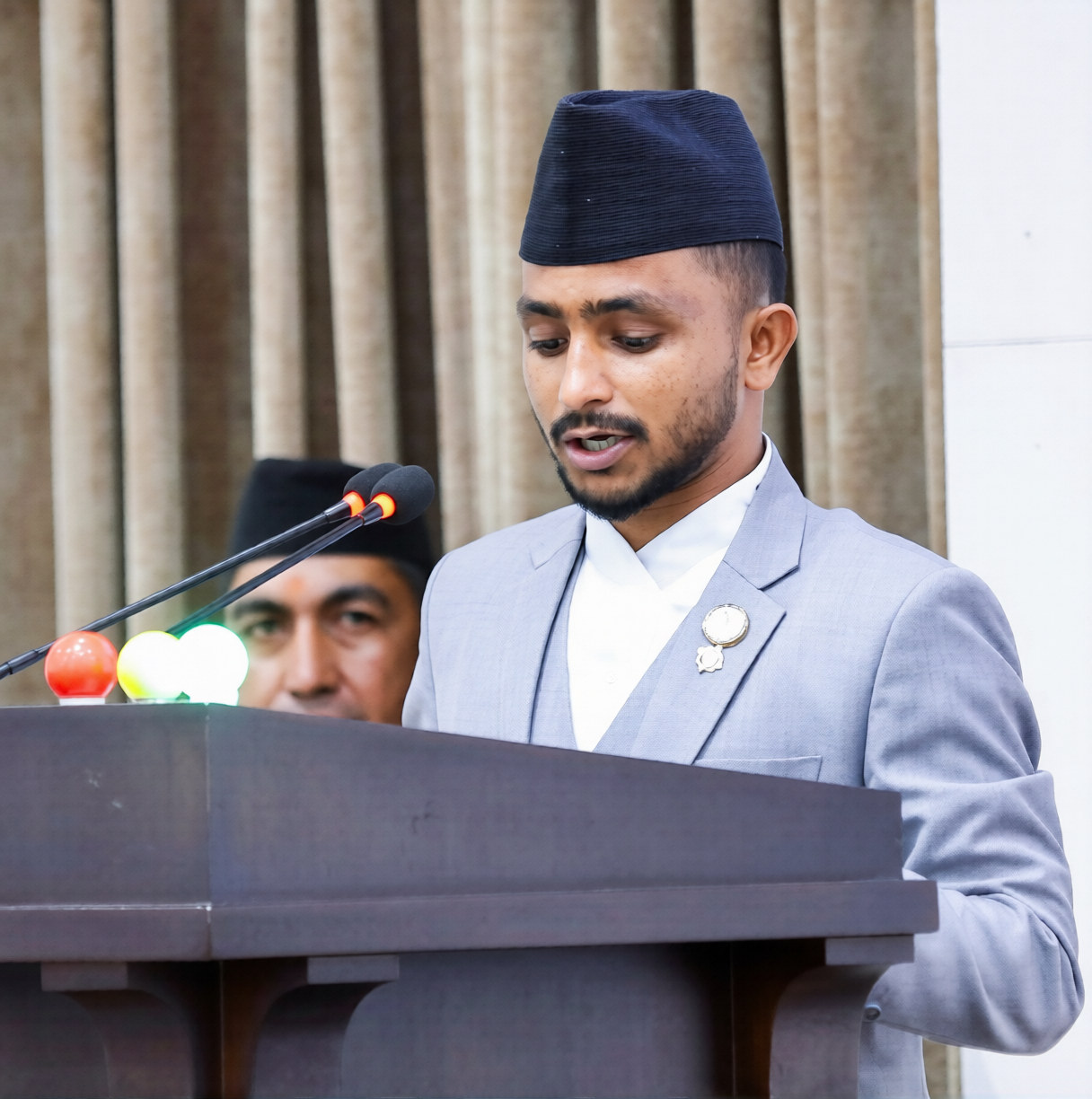
- Khanal in 2026

Member of Parliament, Pratinidhi Sabha
- Incumbent
- Assumed office 26 March 2026
- Preceded by: Arun Kumar Chaudhary
- Constituency: Kailali 2

Personal details
- Born: 11 January 2000 (age 26) Achham District, Nepal
- Party: Rastriya Swatantra Party (since 2026)
- Education: Ratna Rajya Laxmi Campus, Tribhuvan University (MA)
- Profession: Social activist; Politician
- Website: https://kpkhanal.com/

Kshetra Prasad Khanal (Note: Nepali: क्षेत्रप्रसाद खनाल) (born 11 January 2000) is a Nepalese politician, environmental campaigner, and social activist. He serves as a Member of Parliament (MP) in the House of Representatives, representing the Kailali–2 constituency and also a Central Committee Member of the Rastriya Swatantra Party (RSP). Elected at 26 years old, he entered the legislature as one of the youngest serving lawmakers in Nepal's parliament.

== Early life and education ==
Khanal was born in Ramaroshan, Achham, Nepal. He completed his School Leaving Certificate (SLC) at Kalika Higher Secondary School and his higher secondary education (+2) at Rastriya Secondary School, both situated in Lamkichuha, Kailali. He relocated to Kathmandu for higher education, completing a Bachelor of Social Work (BSW) at Texas International College in 2021. He subsequently enrolled in a Master of Arts program in Political Science at Ratna Rajya Laxmi Campus (RR Campus), Tribhuvan University.

== Social and environmental activism ==
Khanal began civic organizing at age 13 as a child journalist and radio presenter for Radio Namaste in Tikapur, where he hosted Bal Bahas ("Children’s Debate"), a child-rights radio program. He expanded into environmental protection, waste management, and youth mobilization. He is the founding chairperson of the Maina Devi Foundation, a non-governmental organization dedicated to sanitation, nationwide volunteer network mobilization, and community awareness.

His notable civic campaigns include:

- Kathmandu Trash Collection Race (2022, 2025): A competitive clean-up initiative across major city corridors involving thousands of participants.
- Cleanup Premier League (2023): A public-awareness and solid-waste cleanup platform partnering with schools and Nepal Telecom.
- All Nepal Clean-Up Campaign: A youth-driven sanitation mobilization running from Mechi to Mahakali.
- Project Menstruation (2023): A reproductive health and hygiene program executed for the underprivileged Chepang community in Chitwan.
- Pandemic Relief and Disaster Response: An emergency oxygen supply initiative in Kailali during the COVID-19 pandemic and relief distribution to landslide victims in Achham.

== Political career ==
Following the 2025 Gen Z protests and subsequent shift in Nepal's political landscape, Khanal transitioned into institutional politics. He joined the reform-oriented Rastriya Swatantra Party (RSP) and was elected to the House of Representatives during the Nepalese general election on 5 March 2026.

Contesting the Kailali–2 constituency, Khanal won with 19,057 votes, securing a victory margin of 7,108 votes over his closest opponent. He took his legislative oath of office on 26 March 2026. His legislative focus centers on environmental regulation, solid waste policies, youth employment, and infrastructure development within the Sudurpaschim Province.

== Awards and nominations ==
Khanal has received national and international honors for his environmental and humanitarian contributions, including:

- National Youth Icon Award (in India) - 2018
- National Youth Lead Award - 2019
- DeshYuvaPratibhaSamman - 2078
- Youth Icon Award - 2020
- National Social Welfare Award (2021) – Government of Nepal
- Venus Samaj Sewa Samman -2021
- Best Social worker Award (UAE)- 2021
- Janasewa Shree Padak from (President of Nepal) -2023
- Young Achiever Award / International Achievement Award (2024) – Thailand
- Kalpavriksha Samman (2024) – Government of Rajasthan, India
