= Nagrik Unmukti Party, Nepal =

Nepalese Political Party

People's Liberation Party, Nepal नागरिक उन्मुक्ति पार्टी, नेपाल
- Chairperson: Kabir Sob
- Senior deputy chairperson: Abdul Khan
- General secretary: Umashankar Chaudhary
- Founder: Resham Lal Chaudhary
- Founded: 30 October 2025; 10 months ago
- Split from: Nagrik Unmukti Party
- Headquarters: Kathmandu
- Ideology: Regionalism; Social democracy Tharu minority interests
- Political position: Centre-left
- Colours
- ECN Status: Registered Party
- Seats in Pratinidhi Sabha: 0 / 275
- Seats in Rastriya Sabha: 0 / 59
- Seats in Provincial Assemblies: 0 / 550
- Chief Ministers: 0 / 7
- Mayors/Chairs: 0 / 753
- Councillors: 0 / 35,011
- Number of provinces in government: 0 / 7

Election symbol
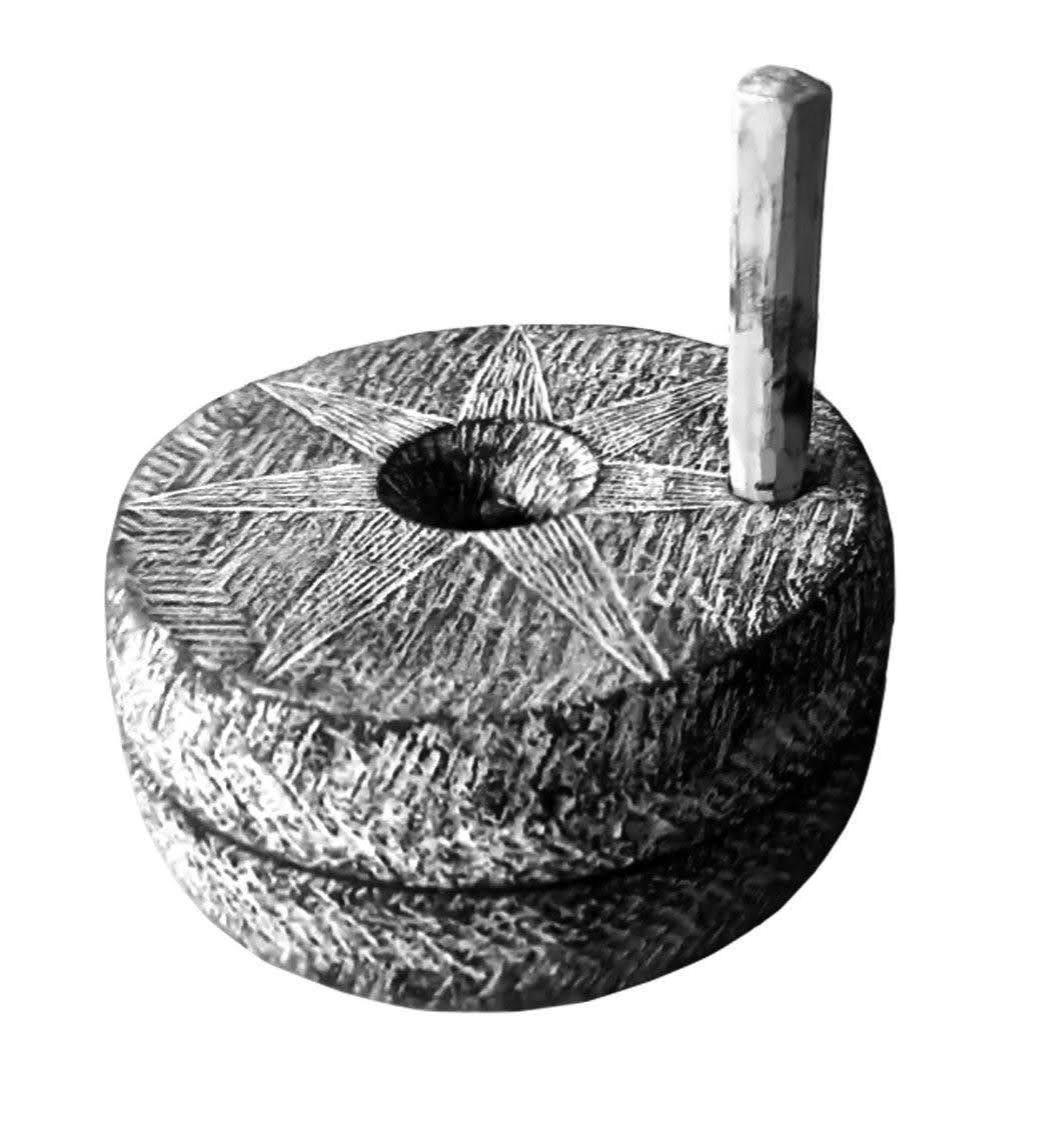

The Nagrik Unmukti Party, Nepal (Nepali: नागरिक उन्मुक्ति पार्टी, नेपाल, lit. 'People's Liberation Party, Nepal') is a political party in Nepal chaired by Kabir Sob and launched by Resham Lal Chaudhary. The party was joined by former ministers and MPs including Abdul Khan and Arun Kumar Chaudhary.

The party has forged alliance with Ashok Rai led People's Socialist Party and Rajendra Mahato led Rastriya Mukti Party Nepal to contest election on common election symbol "janto".

== See also ==
- 2015 Tikapur massacre
- Tharu people
- Tharuhat
