= Kailali 1 =

Parliamentary constituency in Sudurpashchim Province, Nepal

- Parliamentary constituency for the House of Representatives
- Kailali 1 in Sudurpashchim Province; Protected areas in green

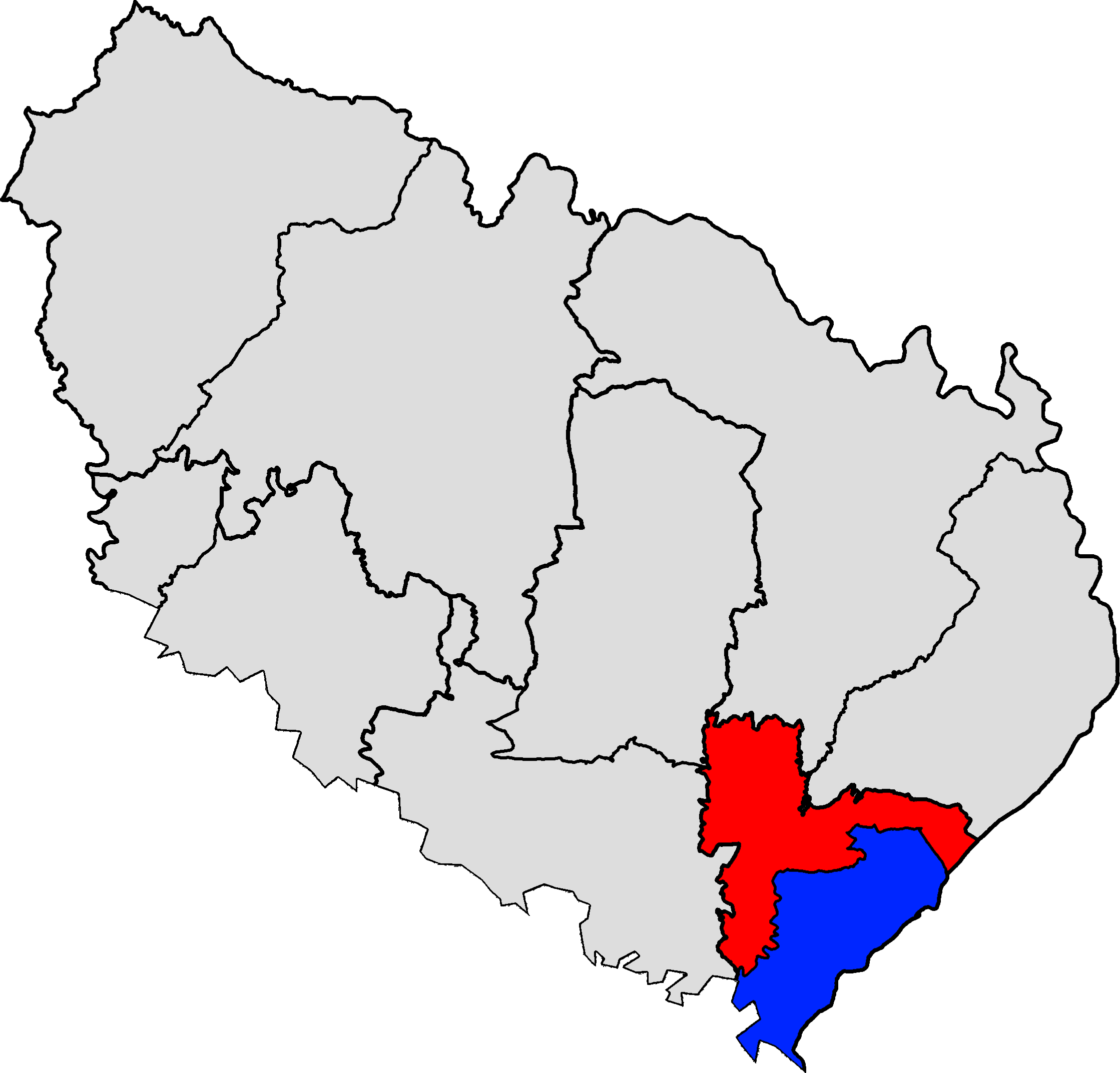
- Assembly segments Kailali 1(A) (red) and Kailali 1(B) within Kailali District
- Province: Sudurpashchim Province
- District: Kailali District
- Electorate: 108,491
- Major settlements: Tikapur Bazaar; Joshipur Bazaar; Bhajani Bazaar

Current constituency
- Created: 1991
- Party: RSP
- Member of Parliament: Komal Gyawali
- Sudurpashchim MPA 1(A): Kailash Chaudhary; NUP
- Sudurpashchim MPA 1(B): Laxman Kishor Chaudhary; NUP

Kailali 1 is one of five parliamentary constituencies of Kailali District in Nepal. This constituency came into existence on the Constituency Delimitation Commission (CDC) report submitted on 31 August 2017.

== Incorporated areas ==
Kailali 1 incorporates Joshipur Rural Municipality, Tikapur Municipality, wards 6 and 8 of Bhajani Municipality and wards 1, 3, 4, 6 and 7 of Janaki Rural Municipality.

== Assembly segments ==
It encompasses the following Sudurpashchim Provincial Assembly segment

- Kailali 1(A)
- Kailali 1(B)

== Members of Parliament ==
=== Parliament, Constituent Assembly ===
Election	Member	Party
1991	Ganga Bahadur Kunwar	Nepali Congress
1994	Himanchal Raj Bhattarai	CPN (Unified Marxist–Leninist)
1999	Sushila Swar	Nepali Congress
2008	Rupa Chaudhary	CPN (Maoist)
January 2009	Rupa Chaudhary	UCPN (Maoist)
2013	Janak Raj Chaudhary	Madheshi Janaadhikar Forum, Nepal (Democratic)
April 2017	Janak Raj Chaudhary	Nepal Loktantrik Forum
2017	Resham Lal Chaudhary	Rastriya Janata Party Nepal
April 2020	Resham Lal Chaudhary	People's Socialist Party, Nepal
August 2021	Resham Lal Chaudhary	Loktantrik Samajwadi Party, Nepal
2022	Ranjeeta Shrestha	Nagrik Unmukti Party
2026	Komal Gyawali	Rastriya Swatantra Party

=== Provincial Assembly ===
==== 1(A) ====
Election	Member	Party
2017	Krishna Bahadur Chaudhary	Rastriya Janata Party Nepal
April 2020	Krishna Bahadur Chaudhary	People's Socialist Party, Nepal
August 2021	Krishna Bahadur Chaudhary	Loktantrik Samajwadi Party, Nepal

==== 1(B) ====
Election	Member	Party
2017	Rana Bahadur Rawal	Nepali Congress

== Election results ==
=== Election in the 2020s ===
==== 2026 general election ====
Candidate	Party	Votes	%
Komal Gyawali	Rastriya Swatantra Party	17,826	32.88
Janka Raj Chaudhary	Nepali Congress	12,867	23.73
Ramlal Dagaura Tharu	Nepali Communist Party	8,392	15.48
Dharika Prasad Neupane	CPN (UML)	4,493	8.29
Fagu Ram Tharu	Independent	3,388	6.25
Lokendra Kunwar	Rastriya Prajatantra Party	2,937	5.42
Pradeep Kumar Chaudhary	Ujyaalo Nepal Party	2,357	4.35
Bimal Kumar Dagaura	Shram Sanskriti Party	908	1.67
Others		1,051	1.94
Total		54,219	100.00
Valid votes		54,219	94.33
Invalid/blank votes		3,258	5.67
Total votes		57,477	100.00
Registered voters/turnout		108,491	52.98
Majority		4,959	
Rastriya Swatantra Party gain			

==== 2022 general election ====
Candidate	Party	Votes	%
Ranjeeta Shrestha	Nagrik Unmukti Party	30,404	49.94
Ram Janam Chaudhary	Nepali Congress	18,081	29.70
Tapendra Bahadur Rawal	CPN (UML)	5,910	9.71
Lokendra Kunwar	Rastriya Prajatantra Party	3,648	5.99
Tanka Prasda Jaishi	Rastriya Swatantra Party	1,869	3.07
Others		966	1.59
Total		60,878	100.00
Majority		12,323	
Nagrik Unmukti Party gain			

=== Election in the 2010s ===
==== 2017 legislative elections ====
Party	Candidate	Votes
Rastriya Janata Party Nepal	Resham Lal Chaudhary	34,341
CPN (Unified Marxist–Leninist)	Madan Kumari Shah	13,406
Nepali Congress	Ishwari Neupane	11,203
Others		1,741
Invalid votes		3,648
Result	RJPN gain	
Source: Election Commission

==== 2017 Nepalese provincial elections ====
===== 1(A) =====
Party	Candidate	Votes
Rastriya Janata Party Nepal	Krishna Bahadur Chaudhary	12,184
Nepali Congress	Janak Raj Chaudhary	9,308
CPN (Unified Marxist–Leninist)	Lal Bir Chaudhary	3,747
Federal Socialist Forum, Nepal	Chandra Prakash Chaudhary	2,681
Rastriya Prajatantra Party (Democratic)	Bhim Bahadur Bam	1,529
Independent	Gaya Prasad Kushmi	1,210
Others		1,208
Invalid votes		1,832
Result	RJPN gain	
Source: Election Commission

===== 1(B) =====
Party	Candidate	Votes
Nepali Congress	Rana Bahadur Rawal	9,434
CPN (Maoist Centre)	Nep Bahadur Tharu	8,906
Rastriya Janata Party Nepal	Laxman Kishor Chaudhary	8,845
Others		1,689
Invalid votes		1,713
Result	Congress gain	
Source: Election Commission

==== 2013 Constituent Assembly election ====
Party	Candidate	Votes
Madheshi Janaadhikar Forum, Nepal (Democratic)	Janak Raj Chaudhary	11,294
Nepali Congress	Rana Bahadur Rawal	9,140
CPN (Unified Marxist–Leninist)	Prem Bahadur Saud	6,977
UCPN (Maoist)	Ful Ram Dagaura Tharu	4,650
Sadbhavana Party	Resham Lal Chaudhary	2,638
Others		3,357
Result	MJFN (D) gain	
Source: NepalNews

=== Election in the 2000s ===
==== 2008 Constituent Assembly election ====
Party	Candidate	Votes
CPN (Maoist)	Rupa Chaudhary	21,780
Nepali Congress	Fakeer Singh Kadayat	8,515
CPN (Unified Marxist–Leninist)	Madan Kumar Shah	6,404
CPN (Marxist–Leninist)	Jagat Bahadur Bogati	1,893
Sanghiya Loktantrik Rastriya Manch	Pradeep Kumar Chaudhary	1,615
Independent	Resham Lal Chaudhary	1,083
Others		3,309
Invalid votes		1,971
Result	Maoist gain	
Source: Election Commission

=== Election in the 1990s ===
==== 1999 legislative elections ====
Candidate	Party	Votes	%
Sushila Swar	Nepali Congress	15,700	35.20
Himanchal Raj Bhattarai	Communist Party of Nepal (Unified Marxist–Leninist)	9,124	20.46
Nain Bahadur Swar	Rastriya Prajatantra Party	7,880	17.67
Nawal Singh Rawal	Communist Party of Nepal (Marxist–Leninist)	7,762	17.40
Balaram Singh Rathaur	Independent	1,167	2.62
Padam B. Tamata	Nepal Dalit Shramik Morcha	981	2.20
Suresh Kumar Aale	Rastriya Janamukti Party	618	1.39
Bhairab Singh Rawal	Independent	601	1.35
Harihar P. Adhikari	Rastriya Prajatantra Party (Chand)	566	1.27
Jyoti Baduwal	Nepal Majdoor Kishan Party	163	0.37
Manju Rana	Independent	39	0.09
Total		44,601	100.00
Valid votes		44,601	93.69
Invalid/blank votes		3,004	6.31
Total votes		47,605	100.00
Majority		6,576	
Nepali Congress gain			

==== 1994 legislative elections ====
Party	Candidate	Votes
CPN (Unified Marxist–Leninist)	Himanchal Raj Bhattarai	8,493
Nepali Congress	Keshar Singh Khadayat	7,441
Rastriya Prajatantra Party	Nain Bahadur Swar	6,700
Independent	Kaiya Chaudhary	5,660
Others		383
Result	CPN (UML) gain	
Source: Election Commission

==== 1991 legislative elections ====
Party	Candidate	Votes
Nepali Congress	Ganga Bahadur Kunwar	20,955
Rastriya Prajatantra Party (Thapa)		7,430
Result	Congress gain	

== See also ==
- List of parliamentary constituencies of Nepal
