= TPU =

TPU or tpu may refer to:

== Science and technology ==
- Tensor Processing Unit, a custom ASIC built by Google, tailored for their TensorFlow platform
- DEC Text Processing Utility, a language developed by Digital Equipment Corporation for developing text editors
- Thermoplastic polyurethane, a class of polyurethane plastics
- Transcranial pulsed ultrasound, a brain-stimulation technique

== Other uses ==
- TACA Peru (ICAO code), an airline
- Tampuan language (ISO 639-3 language code)
- Tikapur Airport (IATA code), Nepal
- Tokyo Polytechnic University, Japan
- Tomsk Polytechnic University, Tomsk, Russia
- Troop Program Unit, an organizational component of the United States Army Reserve
