= Komal Gyawali =

Nepalese politician

The Honourable Komal Gyawali
- कोमल ज्ञवाली

Member of Parliament, Pratinidhi Sabha
- Incumbent
- Assumed office 26 March 2026
- Preceded by: Ranjeeta Shrestha
- Constituency: Kailali 1

Personal details
- Citizenship: Nepalese
- Party: Rastriya Swatantra Party
- Other political affiliations: Nagarik Unmukti Party
- Education: Tribhuvan University (BBus)
- Profession: Politician

Komal Gyawali (Nepali: कोमल ज्ञवाली) is a Nepalese politician serving as a member of parliament from the Rastriya Swatantra Party. She is the member of the 7th Pratinidhi Sabha elected from Kailali 1 constituency in 2026 Nepalese General Election securing 17,826 votes and defeating her closest contender Janak Raj Chaudhary of the Nepali Congress. She was a former party central treasurer of Nagarik Unmukti Party before joining RSP. She holds BBS from Tribhuvan University.
