= Gyanu =

Gyanu is a given name. Notable people with the given name include:

- Gyanu K.C., Nepalese politician
- Gyanu Rana (born 1949), Nepalese singer and reality television judge
