= Ranjeeta Shrestha =

Nepalese politician

- रञ्जिता श्रेष्ठ
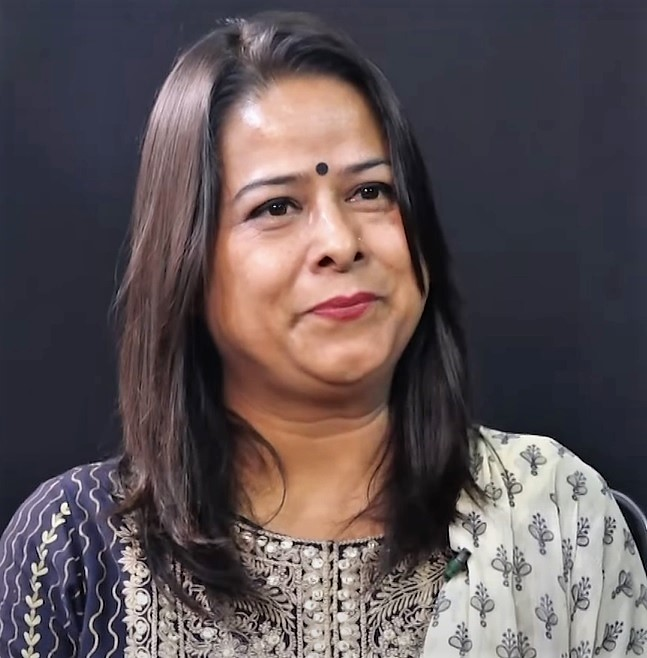
- Ranjeeta Shrestha during an interview

Minister of Land Management, Cooperatives and Poverty Alleviation
- In office 31 March 2023 – 4 March 2024
- President: Ram Chandra Paudel
- Prime Minister: Pushpa Kamal Dahal
- Preceded by: Rajendra Kumar Rai
- Succeeded by: Balaram Adhikari

Chairperson of Nagrik Unmukti Party
- Incumbent
- Assumed office 2022
- Preceded by: Position created

Member of Parliament, Pratinidhi Sabha
- In office 22 December 2022 – 9 September 2025
- Preceded by: Resham Lal Chaudhary
- Succeeded by: Komal Gyawali
- Constituency: Kailali 1

Personal details
- Born: February 19, 1983 (age 43) Kathmandu, Nepal
- Party: Nagrik Unmukti Party
- Spouse: Resham Lal Chaudhary
- Website: https://www.ranjeetashrestha.com.np/

Ranjeeta Shrestha (Nepali: रञ्जिता श्रेष्ठ) is a Nepalese politician and chairwoman of the Nagrik Unmukti Party. Shrestha is the current Minister of Land Management, Cooperatives and Poverty Alleviation since 31 March 2023.

Shrestha was also a member of the House of Representatives and was elected in 2022 from Kailali 1. She resigned her seat on 9 September 2025 following the 2025 Nepalese Gen Z protests.

== See also ==
- Nagrik Unmukti Party
