= Banke 1 =

Parliamentary constituency in Nepal

- Parliamentary constituency
- Banke 1 in Lumbini Province
- Province: Lumbini Province
- District: Banke District

Current constituency
- Created: 1991
- Party: Rastriya Swatantra Party
- Member of Parliament: Suresh Kumar Chaudhary

Banke 1 one of three parliamentary constituencies of Banke District in Nepal. This constituency came into existence on the Constituency Delimitation Commission (CDC) report submitted on 31 August 2017.

== Incorporated areas ==
Banke 1 incorporates Narainapur Rural Municipality, Rapti Sonari Rural Municipality and Kohalpur Municipality.

== Assembly segments ==
It encompasses the following Lumbini Provincial Assembly segment

- Banke 1(A)
- Banke 1(B)

== Members of Parliament ==
=== Parliament/Constituent Assembly ===
Election	Member	Party
1991	Syed Mairaj Ahmed Shah	Nepali Congress
1994	Prem Bahadur Bhandari	Rastriya Prajatantra Party
March 1997	Prem Bahadur Bhandari	Rastriya Prajatantra Party (Chand)
1999	Gyanu K.C.	Nepali Congress
2008	Tilak Pariyar	CPN (Maoist)
January 2009	Tilak Pariyar	UCPN (Maoist)
2013	Dev Raj Bhar	CPN (Unified Marxist–Leninist)
2017	Maheshwar Jung Gahatraj	CPN (Maoist Centre)
May 2018	Maheshwar Jung Gahatraj	Nepal Communist Party
March 2021	Maheshwar Jung Gahatraj	CPN (Maoist Centre)
2022	Surya Prasad Dhakal	CPN (Unified Marxist–Leninist)
2026	Suresh Kumar Chaudhary	Rastriya Swatantra Party

=== Provincial Assembly ===
==== 1(A) ====
Election	Member	Party
2017	Krishna K.C.	CPN (Maoist Centre)
May 2018	Krishna K.C.	Nepal Communist Party

==== 1(B) ====
Election	Member	Party
2017	Arati Paudel	CPN (Unified Marxist-Leninist)
May 2018	Arati Paudel	Nepal Communist Party

== Election results ==
=== Election in the 2020s ===
==== 2026 general election ====
Candidate	Party	Votes	%
Suresh Kumar Chaudhary	Rastriya Swatantra Party	32,792	46.82
Narayan Prasad Goudel	Nepali Congress	15,301	21.85
Surya Prasad Dhakal	CPN (UML)	11,095	15.84
Narendra Prasad Pandey	Nepali Communist Party	6,020	8.60
Pradeep Kumar Shah	Rastriya Prajatantra Party	2,379	3.40
Krishna K.C.	Pragatisheel Loktantrik Party	1,240	1.77
Bharat Nidhi Tiwari	Shram Sanskriti Party	463	0.66
Dhan Bahadur Khadka	Ujyaalo Nepal Party	243	0.35
Deepak Budhathoki	CPN (Maoist)	183	0.26
Tulsiram Sapkota	Rastriya Janamorcha	126	0.18
Rajendra Kumar Bishwakarma	People's Socialist Party, Nepal	84	0.12
Surja Thapa	Nepal Workers Peasants Party	56	0.08
Diwakar Sharma	Independent	39	0.06
Ferulal Chaudhary	Mongol National Organisation	12	0.02
Total		70,033	100.00
Majority		17,491	
Rastriya Swatantra Party gain from CPN (UML)			

==== 2022 general election ====
Candidate	Party	Votes	%
Surya Prasad Dhakal	CPN (UML)	25,026	35.34
Maheshwar Jung Gahatraj	CPN (Maoist Centre)	19,632	27.72
Suresh Kumar Chaudhary	Nagrik Unmukti Party	11,465	16.19
Aananda Babu Kafle	Rastriya Swatantra Party	10,071	14.22
Ram Kumar Yadav	People's Socialist Party, Nepal	2,693	3.80
Others		1,924	2.72
Total		70,811	100.00
Majority		5,394	
CPN (UML) gain			

=== Election in the 2010s ===
==== 2017 legislative elections ====
Party	Candidate	Votes
CPN (Maoist Centre)	Maheshwar Jung Gahatraj	31,173
Nepali Congress	Madhav Ram Khatri	28,217
Federal Socialist Forum, Nepal	Lal Bahadur Shah	4,588
Others		2,265
Invalid votes		3,592
Result	Maoist Centre gain	
Source: Election Commission

==== 2017 Nepalese provincial elections ====
===== 1(A) =====
Party	Candidate	Votes
CPN (Maoist Centre)	Krishna K.C.	13,436
Nepali Congress	Sharad Chandra Verma	10,240
Federal Socialist Forum, Nepal	Kamsar Khan	4,553
Others		2,174
Invalid votes		2,304
Result	Maoist Centre gain	
Source: Election Commission

===== 1(B) =====
Party	Candidate	Votes
CPN (Unified Marxist–Leninist)	Arati Paudel	19,389
Nepali Congress	Narayan Prasad Gaudel	15,205
Others		1,333
Invalid votes		1,125
Result	CPN (UML) gain	
Source: Election Commission

==== 2013 Constituent Assembly election ====
Party	Candidate	Votes
CPN (Unified Marxist–Leninist)	Dev Raj Bhar	13,972
Nepali Congress	Narayan Prasad Sharma Sigdel	12,429
UCPN (Maoist)	Maheshwar Jung Gahatraj	7,992
Madhesi Janaadhikar Forum, Nepal (Democratic)	Fula Ram Tharu	4,321
Rastriya Prajatantra Party	Prem Bahadur Bhandari	3,919
Others		4,095
Result	CPN (UML) gain	
Source: NepalNews

=== Election in the 2000s ===
==== 2008 Constituent Assembly election ====
Party	Candidate	Votes
CPN (Maoist)	Tilak Pariyar	16,087
CPN (Unified Marxist–Leninist)	Dev Raj Bhar	9,360
Nepali Congress	Gajendra Bahadur Hamal	8,485
Madhesi Janaadhikar Forum, Nepal	Fula Ram Tharu	4,616
Rastriya Prajatantra Party	Prem Bahadur Bhandari	2,848
CPN (Marxist–Leninist)	Padam Bahadur Malla	1,601
Others		2,218
Invalid votes		2,038
Result	Maoist gain	
Source: Election Commission

=== Election in the 1990s ===
==== 1999 legislative elections ====
Party	Candidate	Votes
Nepali Congress	Gyanu K.C.	15,137
CPN (Unified Marxist–Leninist)	Dinesh Chandra Yadav	14,179
Rastriya Prajatantra Party (Chand)	Prem Bahadur Bhandari	7,524
Rastriya Prajatantra Party	Chet Bahadur Thapa	5,494
CPN (Marxist–Leninist)	Krishna Raj Pant	1,984
Independent	Thakur Singh Tharu	1,028
Others		807
Invalid votes		1,590
Result	Congress gain	
Source: Election Commission

==== 1994 legislative elections ====
Party	Candidate	Votes
Rastriya Prajatantra Party	Prem Bahadur Bhandari	15,276
Nepali Congress	Sanat Kumar Regmi	11,8124
CPN (Unified Marxist–Leninist)	Kali Bahadur Dhital	8,451
Independent	Yuvaraj Sharma	1,076
Others		2,286
Result	RPP gain	
Source: Election Commission

==== 1991 legislative elections ====
Party	Candidate	Votes
Nepali Congress	Syed Mairaj Ahmed Shah	14,604
CPN (Unified Marxist–Leninist)		7,222
Result	Congress gain	

== See also ==
- List of parliamentary constituencies of Nepal
