= Dev Raj Bhar =

Nepali politician

Member of the Constituent Assembly
- In office 21 January 2014 – 14 October 2017
- Preceded by: Tilak Pariyar
- Succeeded by: Maheshwar Jung Gahatraj (as Member of Parliament)
- Constituency: Banke 1

Personal details
- Born: 29 January 1952 (age 74) Balkot, Arghakhanchi
- Party: Communist Party of Nepal (Unified Marxist–Leninist)
- Parents: Mani Ram Sharma; Kala Panthi

Dev Raj Bhar (Nepali: देव राज भार) is a member of 2nd Nepalese Constituent Assembly. He won Banke–1 seat in CA assembly, 2013 from Communist Party of Nepal (Unified Marxist–Leninist).
