= Nagarkot panoramic hiking trail =

Hiking trail in Nepal

Coordinates: 27.730539°N 85.527861°E

The Nagarkot Panoramic Hiking Trail is a 12 km hike near the community of Nagarkot, Nepal. It is about a 3 to 3.5 hour walk, with views of the Himalayas. It includes the Nagarkot Nature Trail and the Tamang Village Walk.

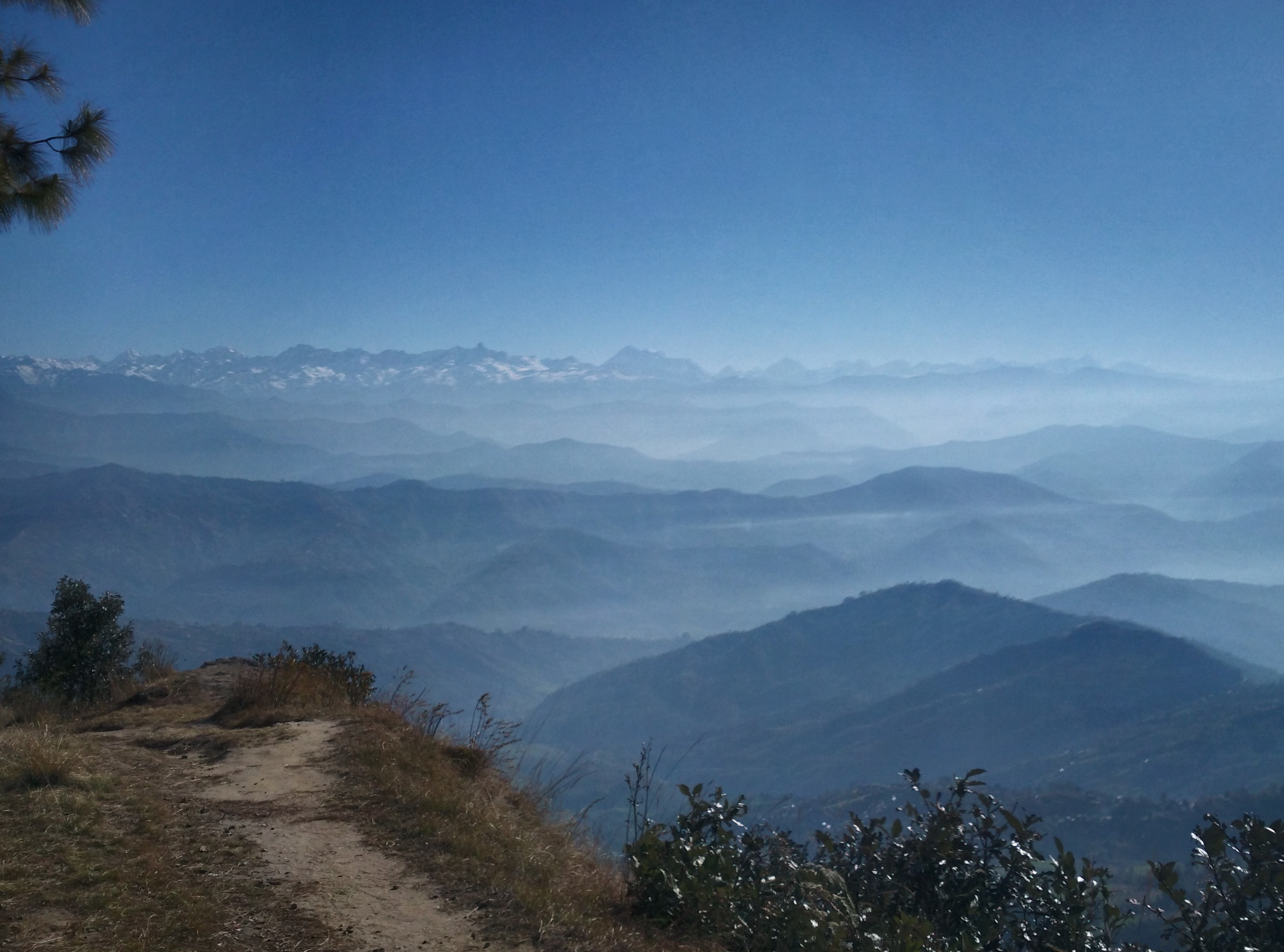
View from the Nagarkot hiking trail
