= Abdul Khan (Nepalese politician) =

Nepalese politician

Honourable Abdul Khan
- अब्दुल खांन

Minister of Water Supply of Nepal
- In office 26 December 2022 – 31 March 2023
- President: Bidhya Devi Bhandari; Ram Chandra Poudel
- Prime Minister: Pushpa Kamal Dahal
- Preceded by: Umakant Chaudhary

Member of Parliament, Pratinidhi Sabha for Janamat Party
- In office 2022–2025

Personal details
- Party: Nagrik Unmukti Party, Nepal
- Other political affiliations: Janamat Party (till 2025)
- Parents: Imam (father); Asgara Begam (mother)

Abdul Khan (Nepali: अब्दुल खांन) is a Nepalese politician and a former Minister of Water Supply serving in the post from 26 December 2022 to 31 March 2023 in the Third Dahal Cabinet. Khan is also the senior deputy chairperson of Nagrik Unmukti Party, Nepal.

Khan who served as senior vice president too belonged to the Janamat Party which he quit in 2025 citing its culture of leader-worship. He has served as a member of the 2nd Federal Parliament of Nepal and was elected in the 2022 Nepalese general election as a proportional representative from the Muslims category. Lately, has beewas also ted as Chairman of Industry, Commerce, labor and consumer welfare committee of Federal Parliament of Nepal.

== See also ==
- Nagrik Unmukti Party, Nepal
