= Maheshwar Jung Gahatraj =

Nepali politician

- महेश्वर जंग गहतराज

Minister for Youth and Sports
- In office 8 October 2021 – 26 December 2022
- President: Bidya Devi Bhandari
- Prime Minister: Sher Bahadur Deuba
- Preceded by: Ekbal Miya
- Succeeded by: Dig Bahadur Limbu

Member of Parliament, Pratinidhi Sabha
- In office 4 March 2018 – 18 September 2022
- Preceded by: Dev Raj Bhar (as Member of the Constituent Assembly)
- Succeeded by: Surya Prasad Dhakal
- Constituency: Banke 1

Personal details
- Born: 28 August 1971 (age 54) Banke District
- Party: CPN (Maoist Centre)
- Other party: Nepal Communist Party (2018-2021)
- Nickname: Athak

Maheshwar Jung Gahatraj (alt. forename: Maheshwor; alt. middle name:Jang, Janga; nickname:Athak) (born August 28, 1971) is a Nepali communist politician and a former member of the Pratinidhi Sabha of the federal parliament of Nepal. He also previously served as the Minister for Youth and Sports between 8 October 2021 to 26 December 2022. He was the commander of the first attack carried out by the Maoists, that began the Nepalese civil war.

== Political career ==
Gahatraj was a member of CPN (Masal) until 1987. He joined the Maoist party, and during the civil war, was the party "In-Charge" for Rukum, Banke, Bardiya, Surkhet, Humla, Kalikot, Jumla and Mugu districts. At the commencement of the maoist insurgency in Nepal in 1996, he was the commander of the first attack against Nepali government, carried out on the police post in Radijyula, Aathbiskot of Rukum. As of 2013, he was the central committee member of the Maoist party, having been in the role since 2003. After the maoists joined the peace process, he focused his political activities from Banke District, and was the candidate for the party from Banke-1 constituency in 2013 constituent assembly elections.

In the 2017 legislative election, he was elected to parliament under the first-past-the-post representing CPN (Maoist Centre) of the left alliance in Banke-1 constituency. He defeated his nearest rival, Madhav Ram Khatri of Nepali Congress, acquiring 31,173 votes to Khatri's 28,217.

Following the merger of CPN (Maoist Centre) with CPN UML to form Nepal Communist Party (NCP), he represents the new party in parliament. He was also elected "Co-Incharge" of the party for Banke District.
