= Tharuhat =

Tharuwan is also the homeland of Tharu people in Terai region of Nepal. It comprises the 11 southwestern Terai districts of Nepal. Tharuhat was proposed Tharu ethnic state by the Tharuhat Tarai Party Nepal. Deadly clashes have broken out between Tharu protestors with government forces repeatedly over demands. Tensions eased by June 2017 with an election looming in Tikapur.

== See also ==
- List of provinces of Nepal
- People's Freedom Party
- Nepal Loktantrik Forum
- List of districts of Nepal
- Limbuwan
- Terai
- Tamuwan
