= Kailali 2 =

Parliamentary constituency in Sudurpashchim Province, Nepal

- Parliamentary constituency for the House of Representatives
- Kailali 2 in Sudurpashchim Province; Protected areas in green

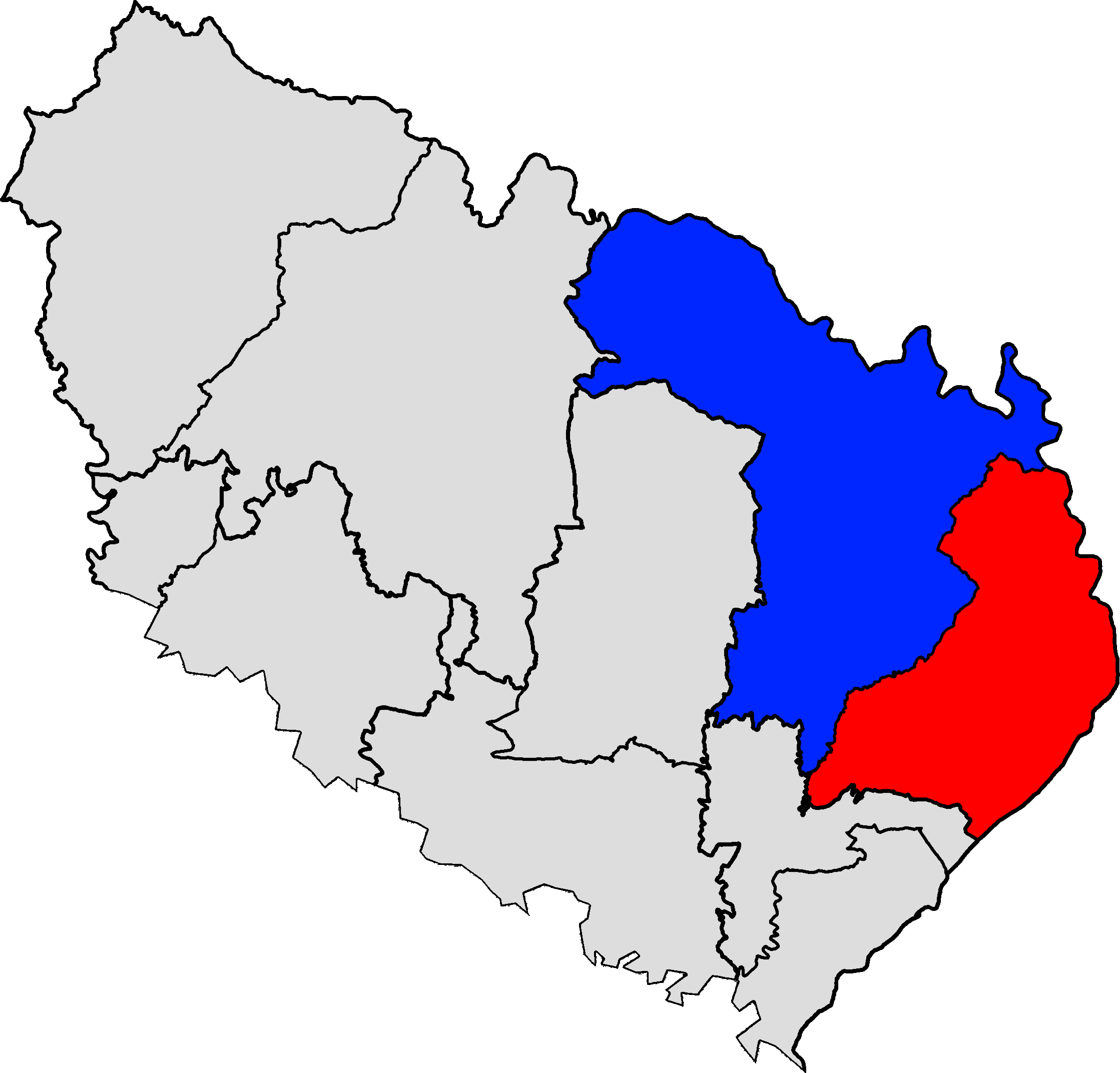
- Assembly segments Kailali 2(A) (red) and Kailali 2(B) within Kailali District
- Province: Sudurpashchim Province
- District: Kailali District
- Electorate: 89,871

Current constituency
- Created: 1991
- Party: Rastriya Swatantra Party
- Member of Parliament: KP Khanal
- Sudurpashchim MPA 2(A): Kamal Bahadur Shah (NC)
- Sudurpashchim MPA 2(B): Rameshwar Chaudhary (NUP)

Kailali 2 is one of five parliamentary constituencies of Kailali District in Nepal. This constituency came into existence on the Constituency Delimitation Commission (CDC) report submitted on 31 August 2017.

== Incorporated areas ==
Kailali 2 incorporates Lamkichuha Municipality, wards 2, 5, 8 and 9 of Janaki Rural Municipality, wards 1–4 of Mohanyal Rural Municipality, and Bardagoriya Rural Municipality.

== Assembly segments ==
It encompasses the following Sudurpashchim Provincial Assembly segment

- Kailali 2(A)
- Kailali 2(B)

== Members of Parliament ==
=== Parliament/Constituent Assembly ===
Election	Member	Party
1991	Ram Janam Chaudhary	Nepali Congress
2008	Bhagat Bahadur Badhuwal	CPN (Maoist)
January 2009	Bhagat Bahadur Badhuwal	UCPN (Maoist)
2013	Mohan Singh Rathore	CPN (Unified Marxist–Leninist)
2017	Jhapat Bahadur Rawal	CPN (Unified Marxist–Leninist)
May 2019	Jhapat Bahadur Rawal	Nepal Communist Party
March 2021	Jhapat Bahadur Rawal	CPN (Unified Marxist–Leninist)
2022	Arun Kumar Chaudhary	Nagrik Unmukti Party
2026	KP Khanal	Rastriya Swatantra Party

=== Provincial Assembly ===
==== 2(A) ====
Election	Member	Party
2017	Ratan Bahadur Thapa	CPN (Unified Marxist–Leninist)
May 2019	Ratan Bahadur Thapa	Nepal Communist Party

==== 2(B) ====
Election	Member	Party
2017	Nanda Bahadur Saud	CPN (Maoist Centre)
May 2019	Nanda Bahadur Saud	Nepal Communist Party

== Election results ==
=== Election in the 2020s ===
==== 2026 general election ====
Candidate	Party	Votes	%
Arun Kumar Chaudhary	Nagrik Unmukti Party	21,871	38.57
Jhapat Bahadur Rawal	CPN (UML)	16,128	28.44
Bhagat Bahadur Bhaduwal	CPN (Maoist Centre)	15,116	26.65
Bharat Singh B.C.	Rastriya Prajatantra Party	2,784	4.91
Others		811	1.43
Total		56,710	100.00
Majority		5,743	
Nagrik Unmukti Party gain			

=== Election in the 2010s ===
==== 2017 legislative elections ====
Party	Candidate	Votes
CPN (Unified Marxist–Leninist)	Jhapat Bahadur Rawal	25,157
Nepali Congress	Mohan Singh Rathore	23,313
Rastriya Janata Party Nepal	Ram Prasad Chaudhary	5,967
Others		1,741
Invalid votes		852
Result	CPN (UML) gain	
Source: Election Commission

==== 2017 Nepalese provincial elections ====
===== 2(A) =====
Party	Candidate	Votes
CPN (Unified Marxist–Leninist)	Ratan Bahadur Thapa	13,632
Nepali Congress	Him Bahadur Rawal	11,565
Rastriya Janata Party Nepal	Jay Prakash Dahit	4,277
Others		411
Invalid votes		1,632
Result	CPN (UML) gain	
Source: Election Commission

===== 2(B) =====
Party	Candidate	Votes
CPN (Maoist Centre)	Nanda Bahadur Saud	12,077
Nepali Congress	Arun Kumar Chaudhary	11,232
Rastriya Janata Party Nepal	Jang Prasad Badayak	1,008
Others		1,389
Invalid votes		1,571
Result	Maoist Centre gain	
Source: Election Commission

==== 2013 Constituent Assembly election ====
Party	Candidate	Votes
CPN (Unified Marxist–Leninist)	Mohan Singh Rathore	11,932
Nepali Congress	Kamal Bahadur Shah	8,396
UCPN (Maoist)	Bhim Bahadur Kadayat Chhetri	5,952
Madheshi Janaadhikar Forum, Nepal (Democratic)	Bilari Tharu	4,348
Tharuhat Terai Party Nepal	Bir Bahadur Dagaura	2,934
Others		2,868
Result	CPN (UML) gain	
Source: NepalNews

=== Election in the 2000s ===
==== 2008 Constituent Assembly election ====
Party	Candidate	Votes
CPN (Maoist)	Bhagat Bahadur Badhuwal	21,219
CPN (Unified Marxist–Leninist)	Mohan Singh Rathore	10,608
Nepali Congress	Tika Kumari Chaudhary	9,747
Rastriya Prajatantra Party	Dinesh Kumar Shah	1,138
Others		2,308
Invalid votes		1,970
Result	Maoist gain	
Source: Election Commission

=== Election in the 1990s ===
==== 1999 legislative elections ====
Party	Candidate	Votes
Nepali Congress	Ram Janam Chaudhary	21,976
Rastriya Prajatantra Party	Mohan Raj Malla	13,293
CPN (Unified Marxist–Leninist)	Mohan Singh Rathore	11,238
CPN (Marxist–Leninist)	De Raj Kushmi	1,306
Others		1,063
Invalid Votes		2,195
Result	Congress hold	
Source: Election Commission

==== 1994 legislative elections ====
Party	Candidate	Votes
Nepali Congress	Ram Janam Chaudhary	16,114
Rastriya Prajatantra Party	Mohan Raj Malla	11,898
CPN (Unified Marxist–Leninist)	Hanuman Chaudhary	8,294
Others		765
Result	Congress hold	
Source: Election Commission

==== 1991 legislative elections ====
Party	Candidate	Votes
Nepali Congress	Ram Janam Chaudhary	22,747
CPN (Unified Marxist–Leninist)		8,340
Result	Congress gain	

== See also ==
- List of parliamentary constituencies of Nepal
