= Arun Kumar Chaudhary =

Nepalese politician

Arun Kumar Chaudhary (Nepali: अरुण कुमार चौधरी) (born 13 April 1985) is a Nepalese politician and central member of the Nagrik Unmukti Party, Nepal. He was elected in 2022 from Kailali 2 to the House of Representatives. He was arrested on 2 February 2022.

== Electoral history ==
He was elected to the Member of House of Representatives From Kailali 2. He lost Election for Member of Province Assembly from Kailali 2 (B) and Mayor of Lamkichuha Municipality.

=== Nepalese local elections, 2017 ===
Mayor of Lamkichuha
Party	Candidate	Votes	Status
CPN-UML	Mahadev Bajgain	7188	Elected
Nepali Congress	Bhakta Bahadur Thapa	6521	Lost
Madheshi Jana Adhikar Forum, Nepal (Loktantrik)	Arun Kumar Chaudhary	6222	Lost
CPN (Maoist Centre)	Dal Bahadur Bista	4701	Lost

=== 2017 Nepalese provincial elections ===
Kailali 2 (B)
Party	Candidate	Votes	Status
Communist Party of Nepal (Maoist Centre)	Nanda Bahadur Saud	12007	Elected
Nepali Congress	Arun Kumar Chaudhary	11232	Lost

=== 2022 Nepalese general election ===
Kailali 2
Party	Candidate	Votes	Status
Nagrik Unmukti Party	Arun Kumar Chaudhary	21871	Elected
CPN-UML	Jhapat Bahadur Rawal	16128	Lost
CPN (Maoist Centre)	Bhagat Bahadur Baduwal	15116	Lost

== See also ==
- Nagrik Unmukti Party, Nepal
