= Tamuwan =

Tamuwan Autonomous State तमुवान स्वायत्त राज्य
- Province
- Nicknames: Tamu State, Tamu Province

Tamuwan or Tamuwan Autonomous Republic is a proposed Tamu ethnic state within multicultural Nepal, which has had many ethnic groups striving for autonomy. It is represented by the Mongol National Organisation as an umbrella group for all ethnic Mongoloids in Nepal.

== See also ==
- Limbuwan
- Madhesh Province
- Tharuhat
