= Nagarkot massacre =

2005 mass shooting in Nepal

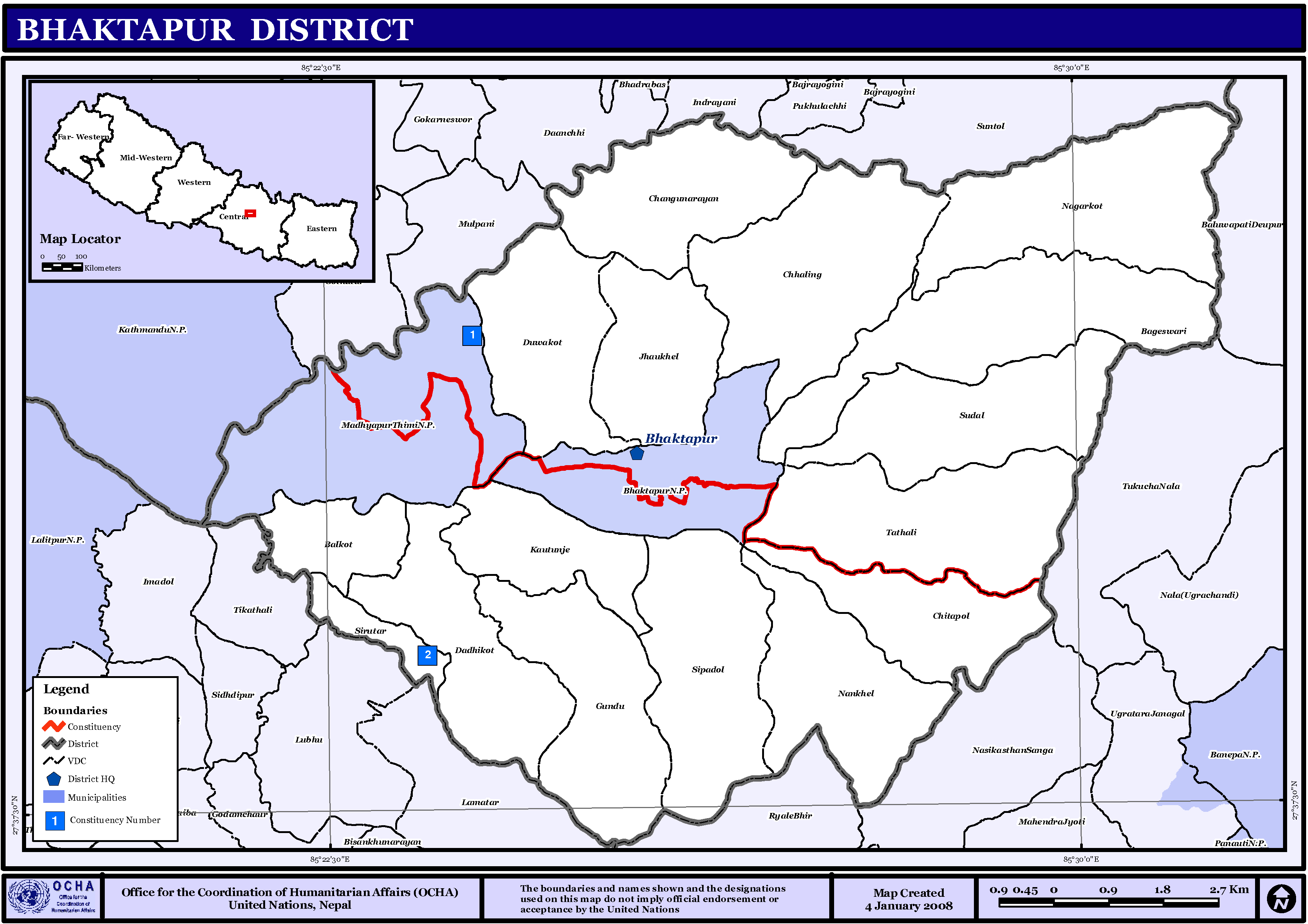
- Bhaktapur district
- Location: 27.7097°N 85.5082°E; Chihandanda, Nepal
- Date: December 14, 2005; 11:30 p.m. (UTC+5:45)
- Attack type: mass shooting, mass murder, murder-suicide
- Weapon: L1A1 SLR
- Deaths: 12 (including the perpetrator)
- Injuries: 19
- Perpetrator: Basudev Thapa

The Nagarkot massacre was a mass shooting that occurred on December 14, 2005, at the Kali Devi temple in Chihandanda near Nagarkot, Nepal. Off-duty RNA sergeant Basudev Thapa (वासुदेव थापा), 26, indiscriminately shot at villagers, celebrating at the temple, with an L1A1 SLR, killing 11 and injuring 19 more, before he shot and killed himself. The shooting was said to be sparked by an argument between Thapa and some of the villagers.

== Shooting ==
While nearly 250 villagers were celebrating Mangsir Purnima at the Kali Devi temple in Chihandanda an argument broke out between Sergeant Basudev Thapa, stationed at the Nagarkot barrack, and youths from the nearby Pipalbot village with whom he had a long-standing enmity. When the youths began to beat him up, the allegedly drunk soldier attacked one of them with a knife. Yelling "I'll come back and kill you all" Thapa, bruised from the fight, drove off in his motorcycle and returned to the barracks, where he armed himself with an L1A1 SLR. Although he was off-duty at that time, Thapa was allowed to leave the barracks with the gun without any further inquiry.

After about half an hour, at 11:30 p.m., Thapa and three of his colleagues returned to the temple grounds. He fired a few shots in the air, before shooting indiscriminately at the people who were trying to seek refuge within the temple from the gunman.

Though many initial news reports named 12 civilians killed, the official report states that only 11 people were shot to death and 19 others wounded by the more than 200 shots fired, before Thapa himself was found dead. According to survivors, eyewitnesses and Royal Nepal Army's statements, Thapa committed suicide. An investigation of Thapa's body found that he had a gunshot wound below his chin which made it likely to be self-inflicted.

== Victims ==
- Ram Lal Nagarkoti, 40
- Nani Nagarkoti, 19, daughter of Ram Lal Nagarkoti
- Chola Kanta Panta
- Sujan Shreshta
- Aaite Tamang
- Bhagwan Tamang
- Dipak Tamang, 5
- Dhamai Singh Tamang, 11
- Kale Tamang
- Maya Tamang

== Aftermath ==
The next day the royal army began to clean the crime scene, deliberately destroying evidence, presumably in an attempt to cover up the incident. When a second rifle was found in a pool about 60 m (200 ft) away from Thapa's body, questions like the presence of second gunman arose.

In consequence human rights activists and opposition parties, as well as the people from Nagarkot demonstrated, demanding an impartial investigation and denouncing frequent human rights violations by and severe corruptness and indiscipline within the royal army. As a response, the government formed a three-member judicial commission to investigate the incident and proposed to pay compensations of 150,000 Nepalese rupees to each of the victims families and to bear the expenses of treating the injured. Further the royal army also established a probe committee to scrutinize the massacre.

The official report was released on January 3, 2006, and stated, that "Thapa committed suicide by shooting himself and no evidence was found of the involvement of any other person except Thapa in the incident". Further it was noted that Thapa had a history of indiscipline and obstructing work and that the leading officer of the Nagarkot barracks had failed to maintain discipline among his personnel. The report also recommended to compensate the victims and their families and to take care of their education and livelihood.

Victims of the massacre protested several times in Kathmandu, because of the passivity of the government in providing the compensations recommended by the probe committee.
