= Jhapat Bahadur Rawal =

Nepali politician

Honourable Jhapat Bahadur Rawal
- झपट बहादुर रावल

Member of Parliament, Pratinidhi Sabha
- In office 4 March 2018 – 18 September 2022
- Preceded by: Mohan Singh Rathore
- Constituency: Kailali 2

Personal details
- Born: 20 January 1975 (age 51) Achham District
- Party: CPN (UML)

Jhapat Bahadur Rawal (Nepali: झपट बहादुर रावल) is a Nepalese Politician who served as the Member of House of Representatives elected from Kailali 2 (constituency). He is Central Committee Member of the CPN (UML).

== Electoral history ==
He has been elected to the Member of House of Representatives from Kailali 2.

2017 legislative elections

Party	Candidate	Votes	Status
CPN (Unified Marxist–Leninist)	Jhapat Bahadur Rawal	25,157	Elected
Nepali Congress	Mohan Singh Rathore	23,313	Lost
Rastriya Janata Party Nepal	Ram Prasad Chaudhary	5,967	Lost
Source: Election Commission

2022 Nepalese general election

He lost 2022 Nepalese general election from Kailali 2.

Party	Candidate	Votes	Status
Nagrik Unmukti Party	Arun Kumar Chaudhary	21,871	Elected
CPN (Unified Marxist–Leninist)	Jhapat Bahadur Rawal	16,128	Lost
CPN (Maoist)	Bhagat Bahadur Baduwal	15,116	Lost
Source: Election Commission

== See also ==
- Nepal Communist Party
- Kailali District
- Kailali 2 (constituency)
