= Tikapur Airport =

Tikapur Airport टीकापुर विमानस्थल
- IATA: TPU; ICAO: VNTP

Summary
- Airport type: Public
- Owner: Government of Nepal
- Operator: Civil Aviation Authority of Nepal
- Serves: Tikapur, Nepal
- Elevation AMSL: 797 ft / 243 m
- Coordinates: 28°31′19″N 81°07′23″E

Map
- Location of airport in Nepal

Runways
Direction	Length		Surface
Direction	m	ft	Surface
05/23	573	1,880	Grass/Clay

Tikapur Airport (IATA: TPU, ICAO: VNTP) is a domestic airport located in Tikapur serving Kailali District, a district in Sudurpashchim Province in Nepal.

== History ==
The airport began operations on 11 October 1984. It served as a hub in western Nepal, as road connections were lacking until the Nepalese Civil War, when operations came to a halt in 1997. The area was then occupied by Kamaiya people, who built shelter within the airports boundaries.

In the late 2010s, the public urged for the airport to reopen, for which minister Prem Bahadur Ale vowed to reopen the airport in 2022.

== Facilities ==
The airport resides at an elevation of 797 feet (243 m) above mean sea level. It has one runway which is 573 metres (1,880 ft) in length.

== Airlines and destinations ==
Currently, Tikapur Airport operates three flights a week (Sunday, Tuesday and Thursday) for Kathmandu via Nepalganj as a short transit. Tara Air and Yeti Air are serving a Tikapur-Nepalganj-Kathmandu and Kathmandu-Nepalganj-Tikapur route three days a week from 15 December 2024.
