= Surya Prasad Dhakal =

Nepali politician

- सुर्य प्रसाद ढकाल

Member of Parliament, Pratinidhi Sabha
- In office 24 December 2022 – 12 September 2025
- Preceded by: Maheshwar Jung Gahatraj
- Succeeded by: Suresh Kumar Chaudhary
- Constituency: Banke 1

Personal details
- Born: 18 April 1972 (age 53) Banke District
- Party: CPN (UML)

Surya Prasad Dhakal is a Nepalese politician belonging to the CPN (UML) who served as a member of the Pratinidhi Sabha. In the 2022 Nepalese general election, he won the election from Banke 1.
