= Gyanu K.C. =

Nepali politician

Member of Parliament, Pratinidhi Sabha
- In office 28 April 2006 – 16 January 2008
- Preceded by: Herself (2002)
- Succeeded by: Tilak Pariyar (as Member of the Constituent Assembly)
- Constituency: Banke 1
- In office 23 June 1999 – 22 May 2002
- Preceded by: Prem Bahadur Bhandari
- Succeeded by: Herself (2006)
- Constituency: Banke 1

Personal details
- Party: Nepali Congress

Gyanu K.C. (Nepali: ज्ञानु केसी) is a Nepalese politician. She was elected to the Pratinidhi Sabha in the 1999 election on behalf of the Nepali Congress.
