= Dansinhapur =

Village development committee in Sudurpashchim Province, Nepal

Dansinhapur दानसिंहपुर
- Village development committee
- Location in Nepal
- Coordinates: 28.44°N 81.06°E
- Country: Nepal
- Province: Sudurpashchim Province
- District: Kailali District

Population (1991)
  - Total: 8,952
- Time zone: UTC+5:45 (Nepal Time)

Dansinhapur is a village development committee in Kailali District in Sudurpashchim Province of western Nepal. At the time of the 1991 Nepal census it had a population of 8952 living in 1446 individual households.
