= 1980 Namita Sunita murder incident =

Unsolved crime in Nepal

Namita Sunita murder incident (नमिता सुनिता हत्याकाण्ड)
- Date: 1980
- Location: Pokhara, Nepal
- Deaths: 3 schoolgirls and 1 witness
- Suspects: Members of the then royal family
- Convicted: no

The Namita Sunita murder incident (नमिता सुनिता हत्याकाण्ड) is a controversial, unsolved rape and murder of three girls that took place in 1980. Three girls, Namita Bhandari, Sunita Bhandari and Neera Parajuli, were raped and murdered in Pokhara, Nepal, with a single witness. The witness, Churamani Adhikari, later committed suicide as per the official report and the case went unsolved.

== Background ==
In the summer of 1980, sisters Namita and Sunita Bhandari took a bus to Pokhara to spend their school holidays. Namita and Sunita, along with their relative Neera Parajuli from Bindhyaabasini visited the Seti river bank. There was a Nepal Army camp nearby on the east side of the Mahendra bridge. As the girls reached the river bank, a group of boys nearby started teasing them and turned hostile, then allegedly raped and murdered all three girls and disposed of their bodies in the Seti river.

== Aftermath ==
In June 2001, King Birendra and his family were massacred and Gyanendra was sworn in as the new king. The case drew suspicion when police were asked to close the case just 10 days after his ascension. The case was closed inconclusively in 2003.
