= Chhintang massacre =

- Native name: छिन्तांग हत्याकण्डा
- Date: November 13, 1979
- Location: Chhintang, Nepal
- Deaths: 15 locals

On November 13, 1979, sixteen people were killed by the government of Nepal at Chhintang VDC ward no-1, Dhankuta district of east Nepal for demanding democracy. They were accused of promoting communist ideologies.

== Massacre ==
Shree Maya Rai, a pregnant woman, succumbed to excessive bleeding inflicted during torture. Another woman reportedly lost her life after a brutal sexual assault by security personnel. Kesharman Rai, a 14-year-old seventh grader, was fatally shot by the police. Dhanbir Rai, a farmer with no political affiliations, was also killed violently.

Some of the victims were known to be politically active, organizing against the oppressive regime. In their memory, a park was later constructed in Chhintang. During each election, political parties pledged to provide redress and support to the families of the deceased.

== List of victims ==
A memorial to the victims is at Panchkanya Sahid Smriti Park in Chhintang. The 16 victims of the massacre were:

1. Rana Dhoj Rai
2. Lakhman Sadhu Rai
3. Gambhirman Damai
4. Tanka Bahadur BK
5. Dhan Bir Darji
6. Ganga Bahadur Tupihang
7. Kesharman Rai
8. Gopal Anana Rai
9. Chandra Bahadur Darji
10. Ganesh Bahadur Biswokarma
11. Putra Man Thulung Rai
12. Bal Bahadur Khatri
13. Hang Khila Sahilee (Shree Maya Rai)
14. Jhagendra Rai
15. Bhairab Bahadur Rai
