= Nagarkot =

Nagarkot नगरकोट (anciently known as Mandapgiri)
- former Village Development Committee; Hill station
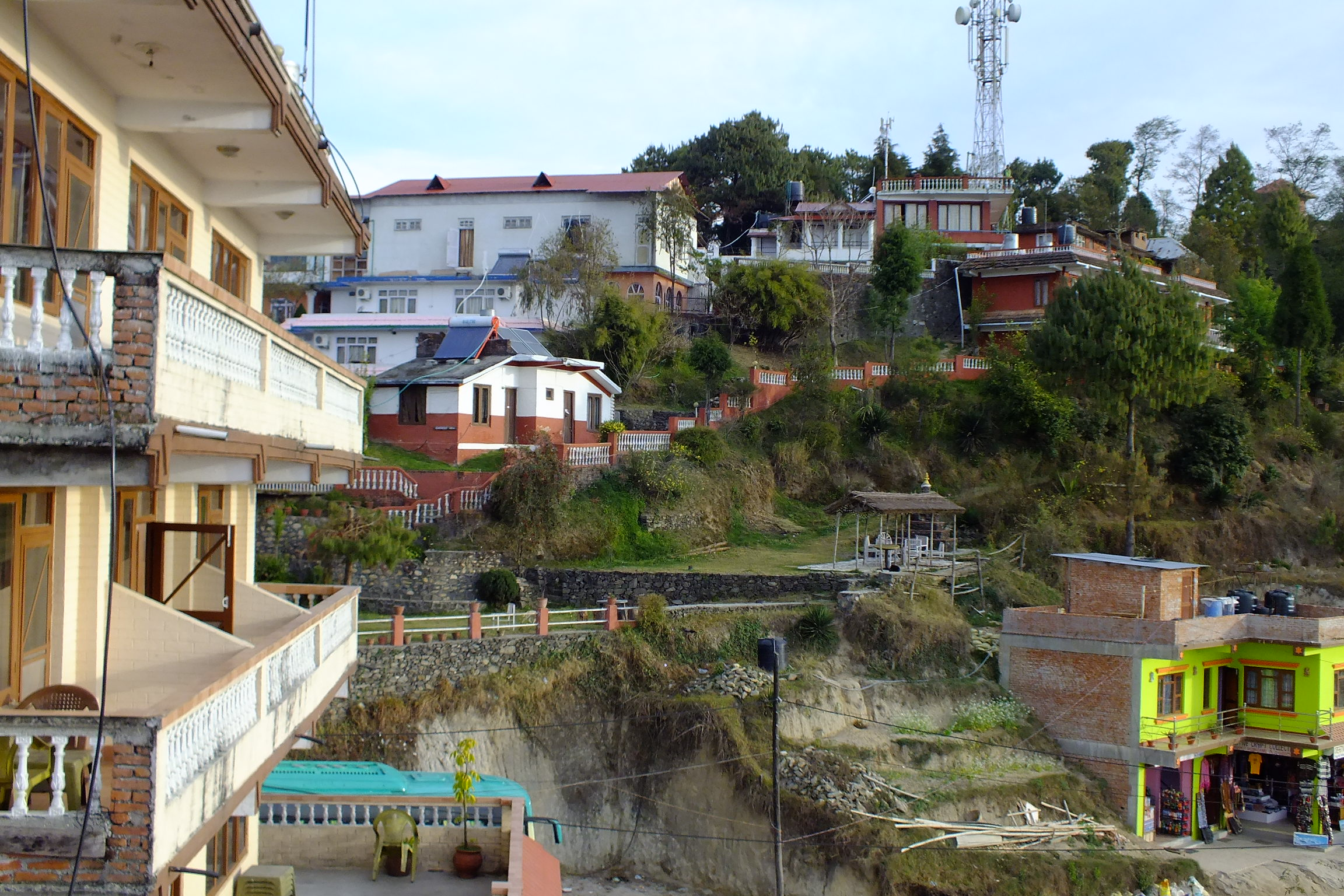
- Nickname: Mandapgiri
- Location in Nepal
- Coordinates: 27.7236°N 85.5247°E
- Country: Nepal
- Province: Bagmati Province
- District: Bhaktapur District
- Municipality: Changunarayan
- Elevation: 2,175 m (7,136 ft)

Population (2021)
  - Total: 5,234
  - Religions: Buddhist Hindu
- Time zone: UTC+5:45 (NST)
- Postal code: 44812
- Area code: 01

Nagarkot (Nepali: नगरकोट) is a serene hill station perched on the eastern rim of the Kathmandu Valley, located in Bhaktapur District of Bagmati Province, Nepal. It is renowned for its panoramic views of the Himalayas—including Mount Everest on clear days. Situated just 32 km from Kathmandu, Nagarkot offers a peaceful retreat from the city's bustle and is a favorite among sunrise chasers, nature lovers, and weekend wanderers.

At the time of the 2021 census it had a population of 5,234 and had 1,084 houses in it. At an elevation of 2,195 meters, it is considered one of the most scenic spots in Bhaktapur District. Nagarkot also offers views of the Kathmandu Valley. The scenery of the place makes it a popular hiking route for tourists. It is located approximately 7000 ft (2000 m) above sea level and 28 km from Kathmandu International Airport.

Nagarkot commands one of the broadest views of the Himalayas in the Kathmandu valley (8 out of 13 Himalayan ranges of Nepal are visible). The ranges include Annapurna range, Manaslu range, Ganesh himal range, Langtang range, Jugal range, Rolwaling range, Mahalangur range (Everest range) and Numbur range with views of the Kathmandu Valley and Shivapuri National Park.

For nature lovers and outdoor enthusiasts, there are many hiking opportunities in and around Nagarkot. Among them, Nagarkot eco trail (nature walk) along with Nagarkot panoramic hiking trail is the most popular ones. It is also possible to do paragliding with Everest view in Nagarkot.

Situated in a strategic location, Nagarkot was an ancient fort of the Kathmandu valley built to monitor the external activities of other kingdoms. Later, it became a summer retreat for the royal family before becoming popular as an international hill station.

== Climate ==
Climate data for Nagarkot, elevation 2,147 m (7,044 ft), (1991–2020 normals)
Month	Jan	Feb	Mar	Apr	May	Jun	Jul	Aug	Sep	Oct	Nov	Dec	Year
Mean daily maximum °C (°F)	12.9 (55.2)	15.3 (59.5)	19.3 (66.7)	22.5 (72.5)	22.8 (73.0)	23.1 (73.6)	22.2 (72.0)	22.3 (72.1)	21.9 (71.4)	20.6 (69.1)	17.5 (63.5)	14.3 (57.7)	19.6 (67.2)
Daily mean °C (°F)	7.9 (46.2)	10.0 (50.0)	13.5 (56.3)	16.7 (62.1)	17.7 (63.9)	19.3 (66.7)	18.9 (66.0)	18.9 (66.0)	18.2 (64.8)	16.0 (60.8)	12.4 (54.3)	9.3 (48.7)	14.9 (58.8)
Mean daily minimum °C (°F)	2.9 (37.2)	4.6 (40.3)	7.6 (45.7)	10.8 (51.4)	12.5 (54.5)	15.5 (59.9)	15.6 (60.1)	15.5 (59.9)	14.4 (57.9)	11.3 (52.3)	7.3 (45.1)	4.3 (39.7)	10.2 (50.3)
Average precipitation mm (inches)	19.3 (0.76)	18.1 (0.71)	25.9 (1.02)	55.0 (2.17)	147.5 (5.81)	325.5 (12.81)	473.7 (18.65)	477.9 (18.81)	253.6 (9.98)	65.8 (2.59)	9.1 (0.36)	11.9 (0.47)	1,883.7 (74.16)
Source 1: Department of Hydrology and Meteorology
Source 2: Agricultural Extension in South Asia (precipitation 1976–2005)

== Gallery ==
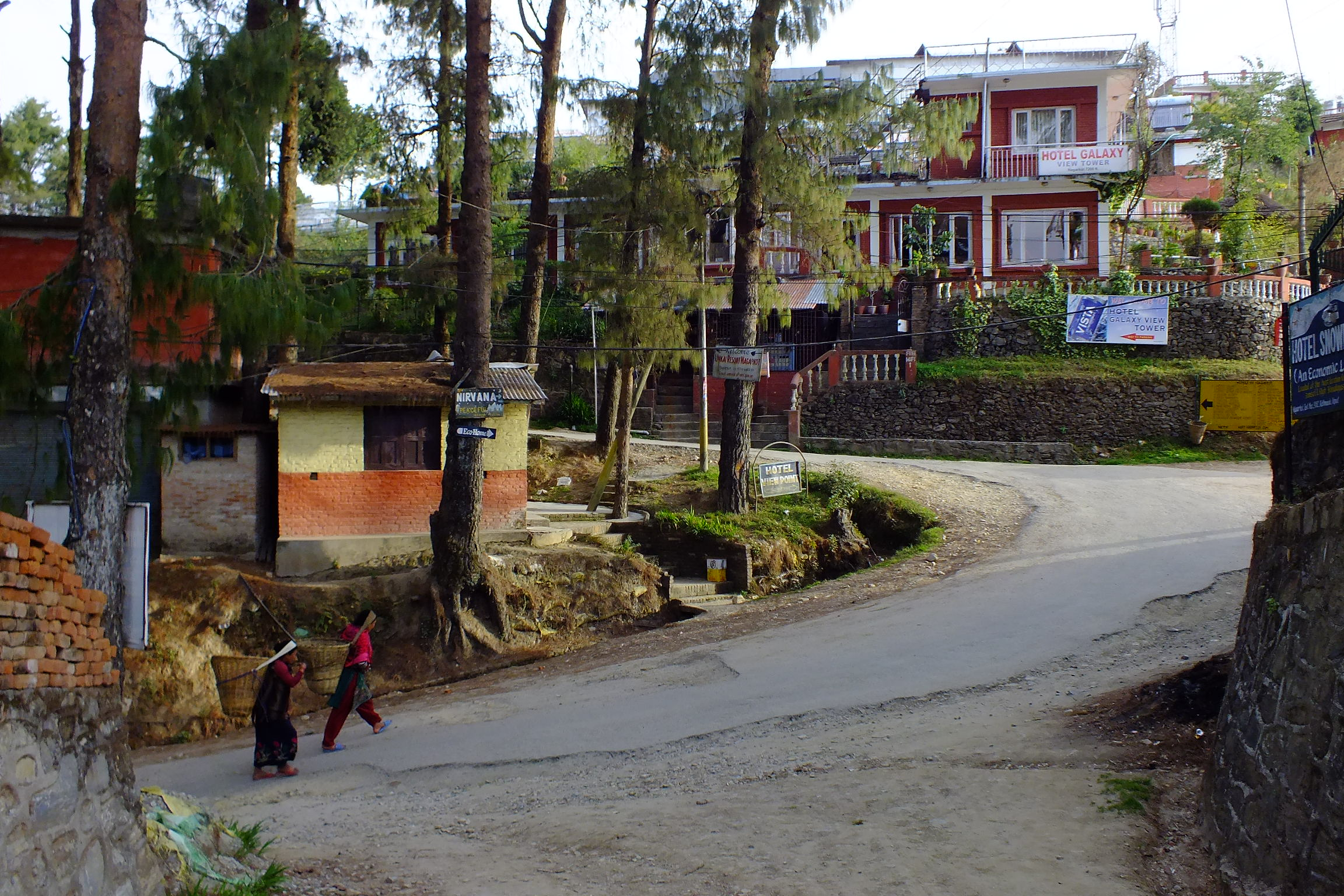
Streets at Nagarkot

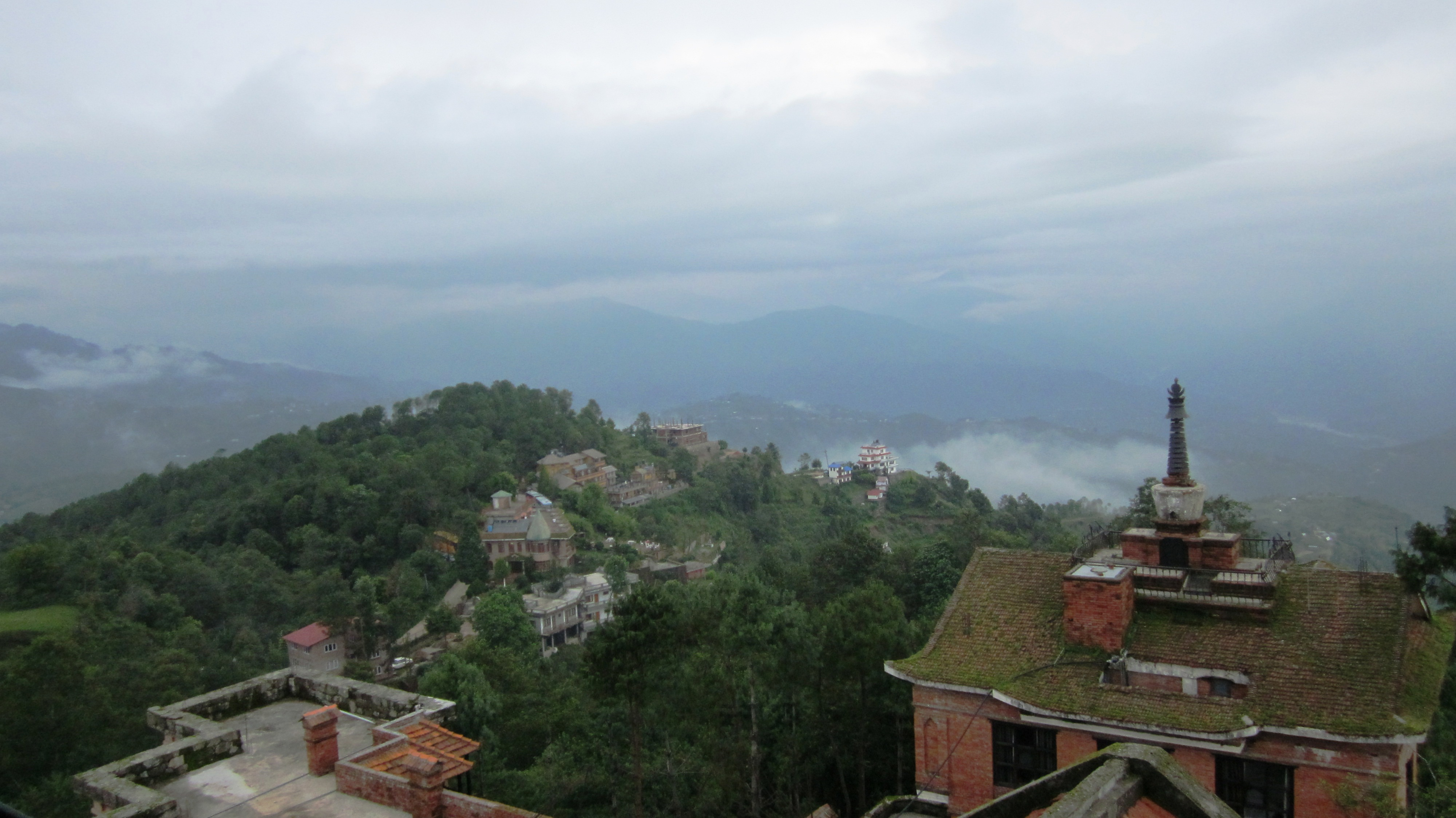
View of Nagarkot

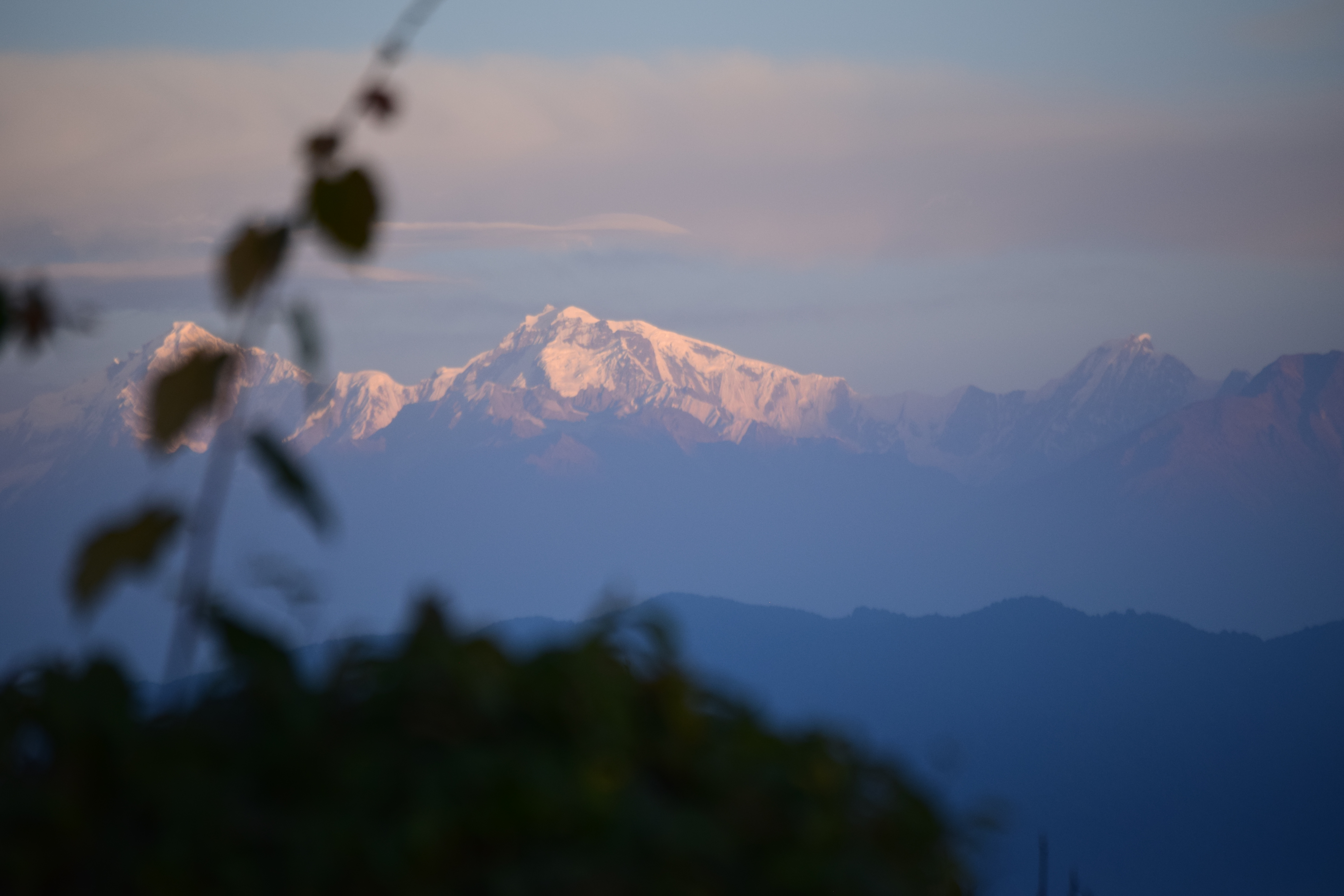
Sunrise at Nagarkot

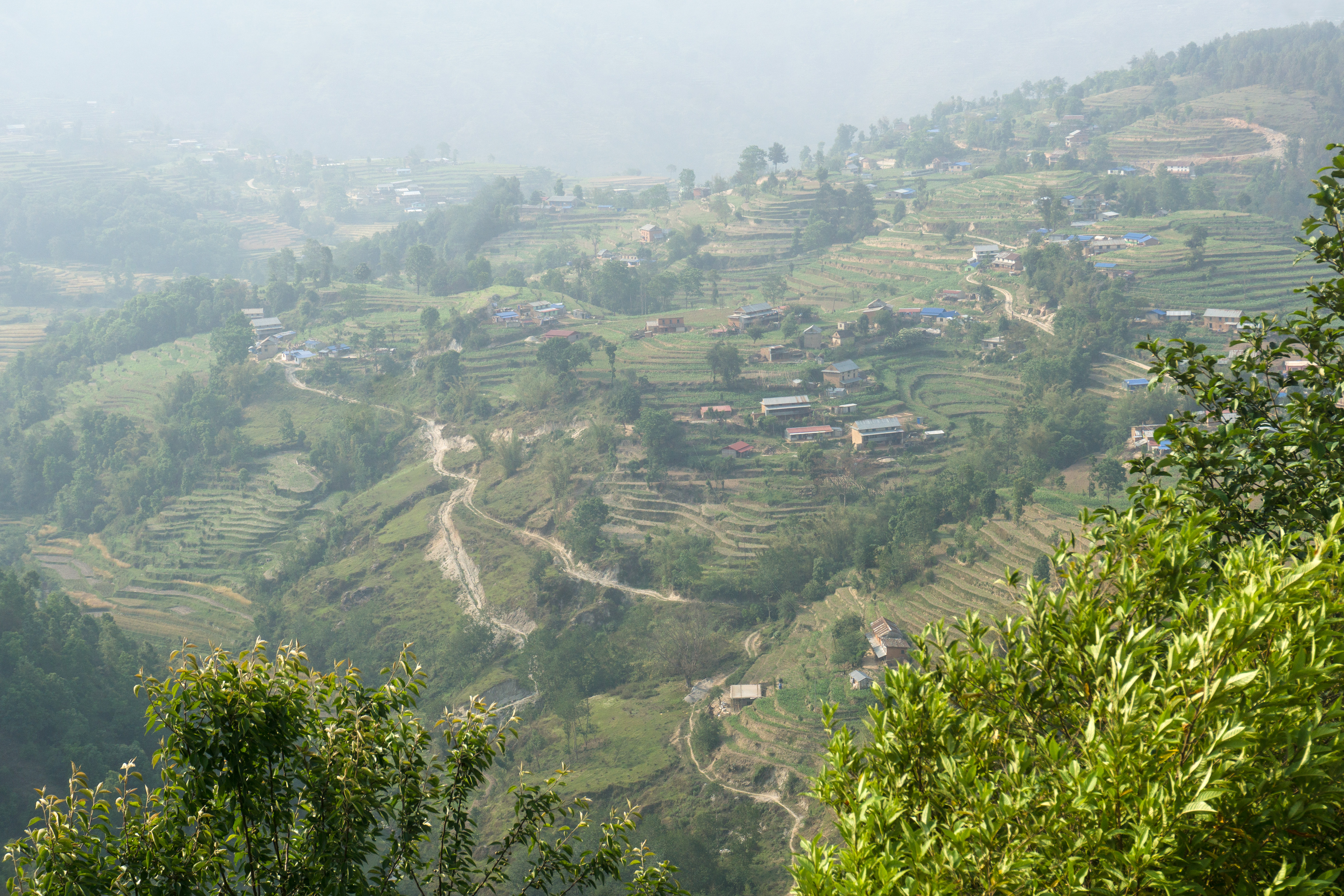
A view from Nagarkot hiking trail

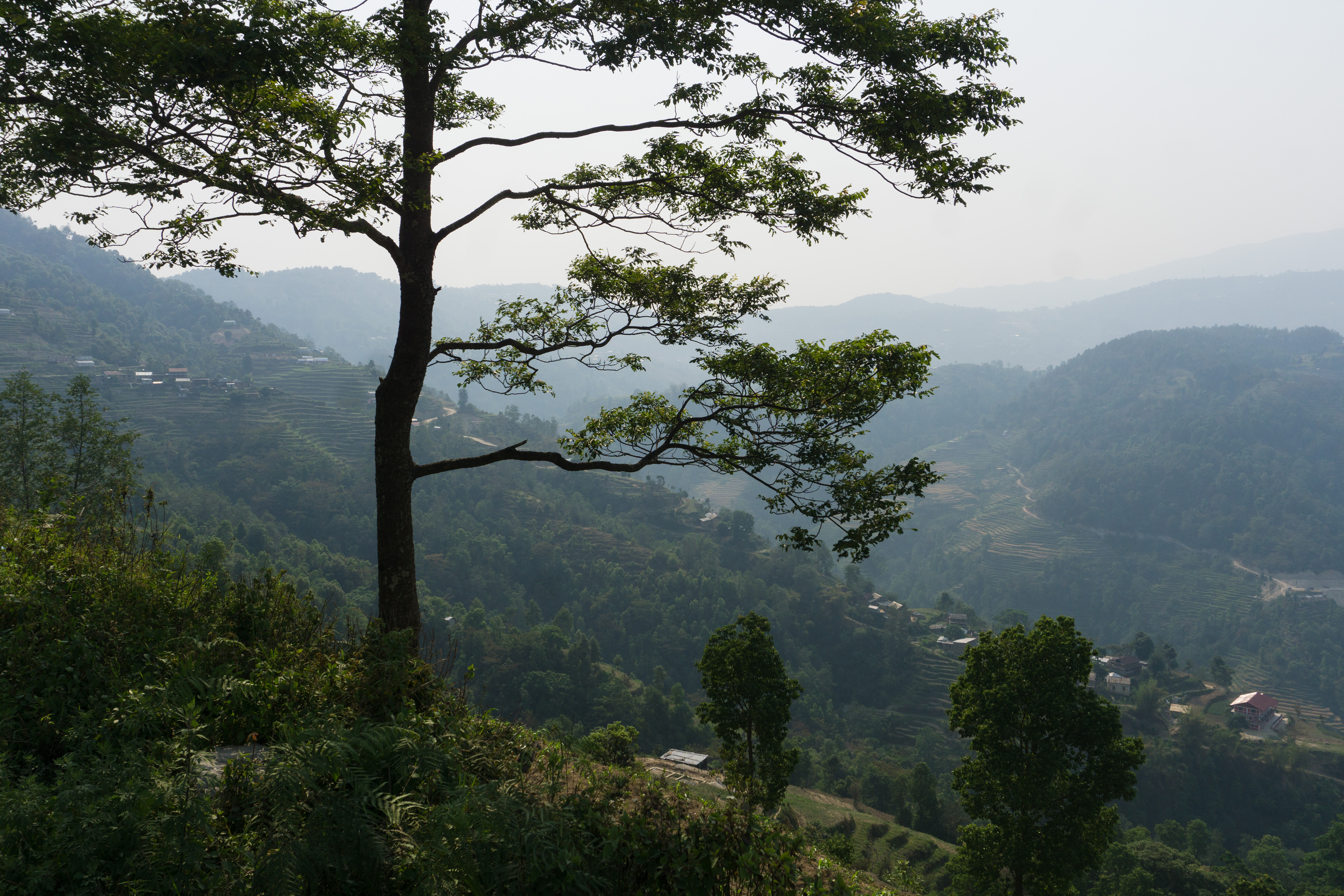
A view from Nagarkot hiking trail

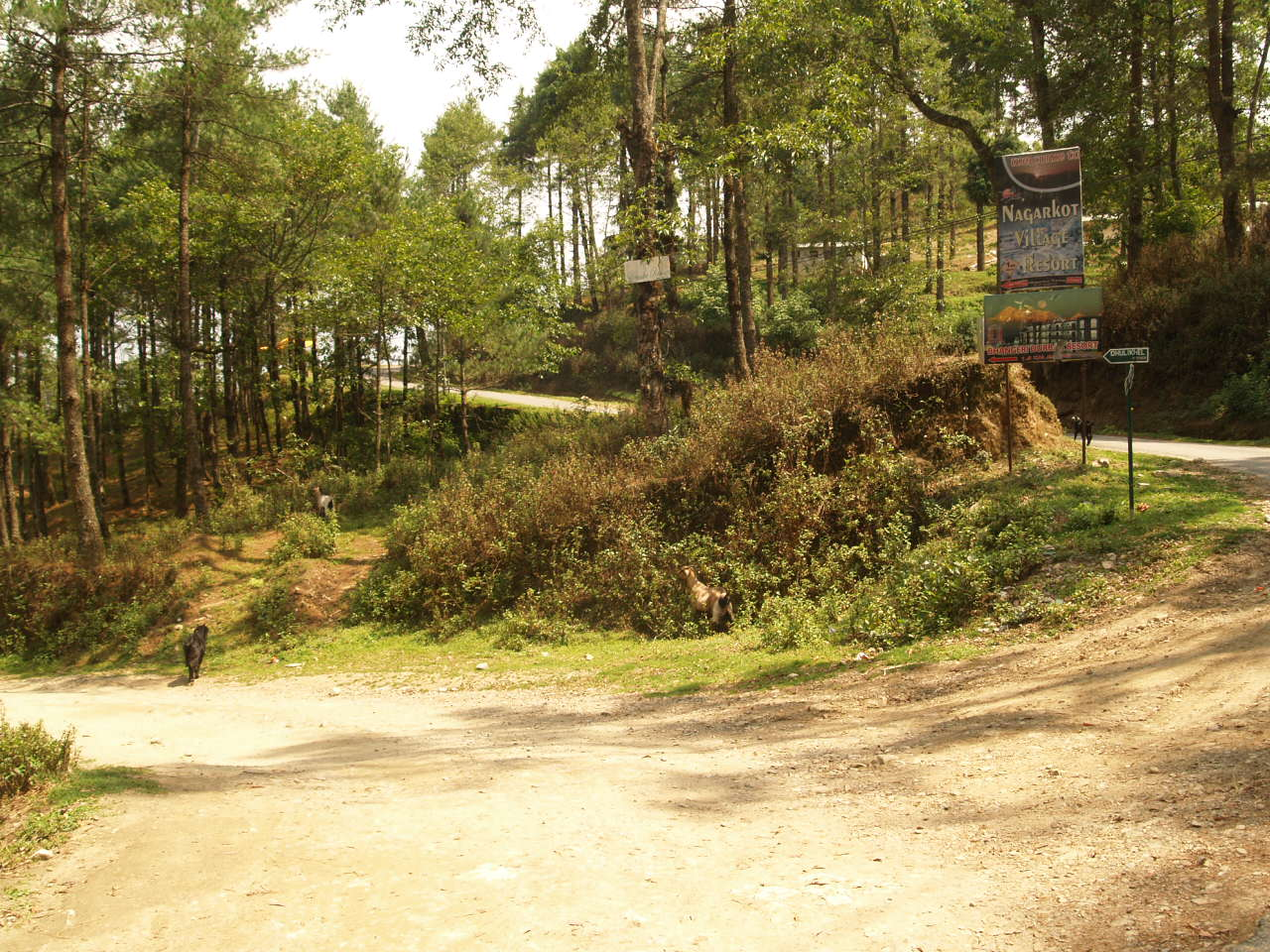
Nagarkot
