= Nagrik Unmukti Party =

Nepalese political party

People's Freedom Party नागरिक उन्मुक्ति पार्टी
- Abbreviation: NUP
- Chairperson: Ranjeeta Shrestha
- Founder: Resham Lal Chaudhary
- Founded: 3 January 2022; 4 years ago
- Split from: PSP-N
- Merged into: Nepali Communist Party
- Headquarters: Kathmandu, Nepal
- Membership: 12,000
- Ideology: Regionalism; Social democracy Tharu minority interests
- Political position: Centre-left
- Colours
- House of Representatives: 4 / 275
- Sudurpashchim Provincial Assembly: 7 / 53
- Local governments: 4 / 753 Mayor/Chairperson

Election symbol

Website
- nagarikunmuktiparty.org

The People's Freedom Party (Nepali: नागरिक उन्मुक्ति पार्टी, Nagrik Unmukti Party) is a political party in Nepal. The party's primary base is in the Tharuhath region, especially Kailali district and Bardiya district.

== History ==
=== Formation and Registration ===
The party was formed under the coordination of Member of House of Representatives, Resham Lal Chaudhary. Due to some acts of law, he could not chair the party, so his wife was chosen as chair instead. He left his former party, the People's Socialist Party, Nepal, claiming that it had become power-centric and that it forgot the mandate provided by the people alleging that the party used it as vote bank.

=== Party expansion and first election ===
The party rapidly expanded in a few months in the Tharuhath region. The party surprisingly emerged as largest party of Kailali district winning 4 local levels including two municipalities and two rural municipalities. The party swept away Loktantrik Samajwadi Party, Nepal and People's Socialist Party, Nepal from Tharuhath region keeping their traditional vote block.

Later the party won 3 seats of 5 seats from Kailali district while won Bardiya 2. As a result party won 7 seats in Sudurpashchim Provincial Assembly while won 4 seats in Lumbini Provincial Assembly and 1 seat in Madhesh Provincial Assembly. The party received 2.57 percent vote share in proportional polls and lagged behind from 3% threshold by 0.43%.

== List of Members of Parliament ==
=== List of Pratinidhi Sabha members from People's Freedom Party ===
No.	Name	Constituency	Province	Elected from
1.	Arun Kumar Chaudhary	Kailali 2	Sudurpashchim	2022 general election
2.	Ganga Ram Chaudhary	Kailali 3	Sudurpashchim	2022 general election
3.	Lalbir Chaudhary	Bardiya 2	Lumbini	2022 general election
4.	Ranjeeta Shrestha	Kailali 1	Sudurpashchim	2022 general election

== Electoral performance ==
=== General election ===
Election	Leader	Party list votes		Seats	Position	Resulting government
Election	Leader	No.	%	Seats	Position	Resulting government
2022	Ranjeeta Shrestha	271,722	2.57 (Note: Represented as Independent for not reaching the 3% threshold)	4 / 275	10th	Confidence & supply

=== Provincial election ===
Province	Election	Party list votes		Seats	Position	Resulting government
Province	Election	No.	%	Seats	Position	Resulting government
Madhesh	2022	49,705	2.38	1 / 107	10th	Confidence & supply
Lumbini	2022	125,521	6.65	4 / 87	5th	Confidence & supply
Sudurpashchim	2022	98,559	11.00	7 / 53	4th	Confidence & supply

=== Local election ===
Election	Leader(s)	Mayor/Chairman	Local levels won
2022	Ranjeeta Shrestha	4 / 753	Janaki Rural Municipality; Tikapur Municipality; Bhajani Municipality; Joshipur Rural Municipality

== List of cabinet ministers ==
No.	Name	Portrait	Term of office		Days in office	Ministerial incharge
Central government
1	Ranjeeta Shrestha		31 March 2023	4 March 2024	339 days	Minister for Land Management, Cooperatives and Poverty Alleviation
2	Arun Kumar Chaudhary		3 August 2024	Incumbent	2 years, 99 days	Minister of state for Culture, Tourism and Civil Aviation
Lumbini government
1	Dharma Bahadur Chaudhary		28 April 2023	4 April 2024	3 years, 196 days	Minister for Physical Infrastructure Development
1	Dharma Bahadur Chaudhary		18 April 2024	21 July 2024	94 days	Minister for Physical Infrastructure Development
Sudurpashchim Province
1	Khushi Ram Chaudhary		8 March 2024	5 April 2024	28 days	Minister without portfolio
2	Ghanshyam Chaudhary		9 March 2024	5 April 2024	1 year, 27 days	Minister for Economic Affairs
3	Rameshwar Chaudhary		9 March 2023	5 April 2024	1 year, 27 days	Minister for Land Management, Agriculture and Cooperatives
5	Kailash Chaudhary		19 April 2024	4 August 2024	107 days	Minister for Physical Infrastructure Development
4	Tika Thapa		30 April 2024	28 July 2024	89 days	Minister for Social Development
6	Laxman Kishor Chaudhary		5 August 2024	Incumbent	2 years, 97 days	Minister for Industry, Tourism, Forest and Environment

== Leadership ==
=== Supreme leader ===
- Resham Lal Chaudhary (2022-31 Oct. 2025)

=== Chairman ===
- Lalbir Chaudhari (current)
- Ranjeeta Shrestha (2022-2025)

== See also ==
- Nagrik Unmukti Party, Nepal
- 2015 Tikapur massacre
- Tharu people
- Tharuhat
