= Resham Lal Chaudhary =

Nepali politician and convicted criminal

Reshamlal Chaudhary
- रेशमलाल चौधरी
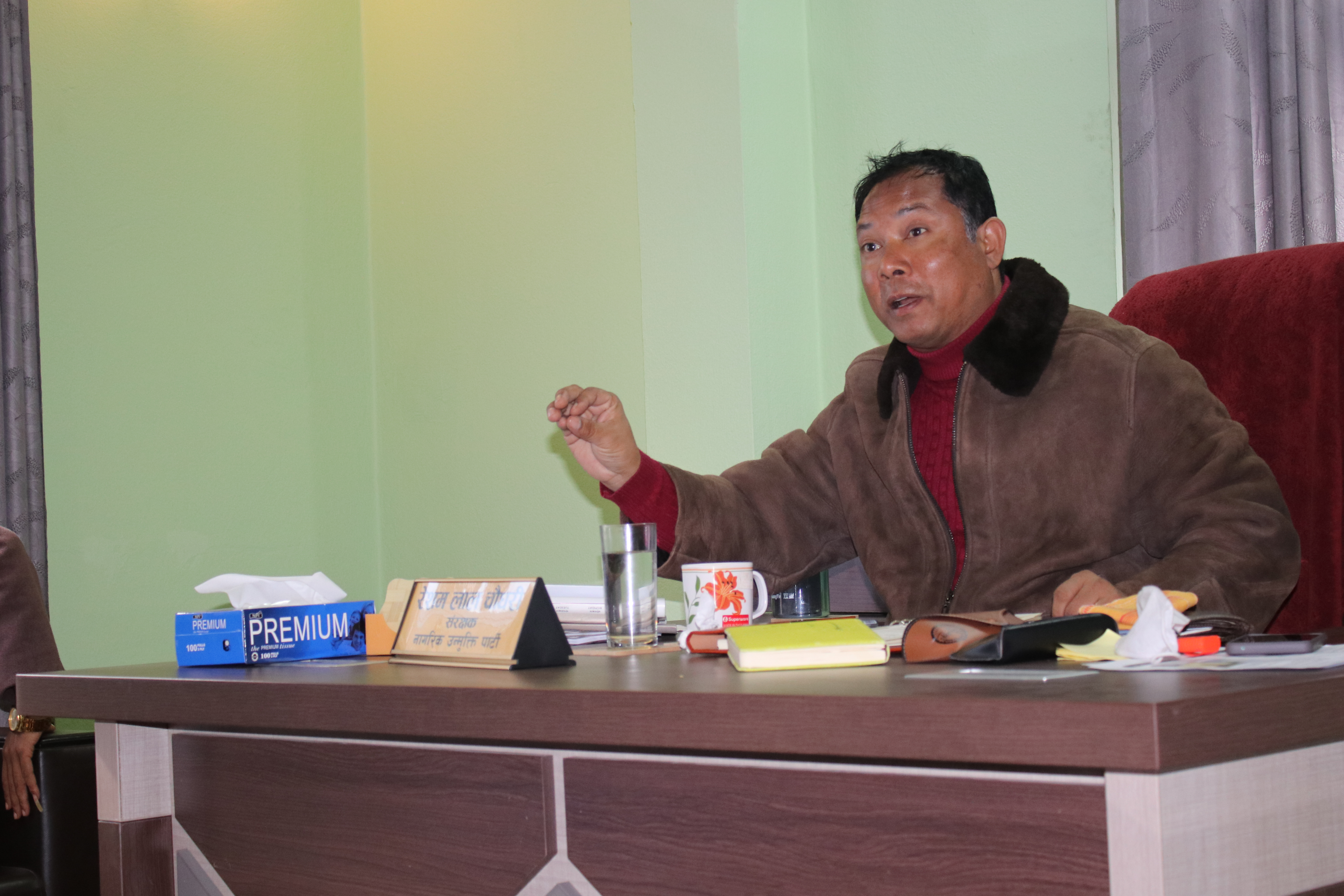

Member of Parliament, Pratinidhi Sabha
- In office 3 January 2019 – 6 March 2019
- Preceded by: Janak Raj Chaudhary
- Constituency: Kailali 1

Personal details
- Party: Nagrik Unmukti Party, Nepal
- Other political affiliations: Rastriya Janata Party; People's Socialist Party; Nagrik Unmukti Party
- Criminal information
- Disappeared: August 2015
- Status: Surrendered on 26 February 2018
- Known for: 2015 Tikapur massacre
- Movement: Tharuhat Movement
- Status: unconvicted
- Criminal charges: murder, conspiracy to commit murder, instigating violence, several others
- Time at large: more than 2 years

Details
- Date: 24 August 2015
- Locations: Tikapur, Kailali, Nepal
- Target: Nepal Police personnel
- Killed: 8 (one toddler)
- Weapons: incitement to lynch mob, axes, scythes, spears, incindiary

Resham Lal Chaudhary, also Resham Chaudhary, is a Nepali former member of Parliament who was sentenced to life in prison for his role in orchestrating and carrying out the 2015 Tikapur massacre. He was later freed on the occasion of Republic day in Nepal.

Chaudhary, a founder of Nagrik Unmukti Party, Nepal which he founded on 30 October 2025.

== Role in 2015 Tikapur massacre ==
Resham Chaudhary was one of the principal leaders of a series of protests in Kailali opposing the proposed administrative demarcations in the new constitution. On August 24, the protest unexpectedly turned into a lynch mob targeting police personnel throughout the city. Seven police officers were killed. The attacks were carried out by people wielding household weapons. One of the victims was burned alive. A toddler, aged two, was also killed in the violence. The police filed murder and other charges against more than 50 people naming Resham Chaudhary as the main accused. He denied the charges and went into hiding.

== Member of the House of Representatives ==
In the 2017 elections, he was fielded by Rastriya Janata Party Nepal from Kailali-1 constituency. He registered his candidacy via proxy while still in hiding. He was elected by an overwhelming majority. He received 34,341 votes, beating his nearest rival by about 19,000 votes. He got 34,341 votes where his nearest rival received 13,406. Following the election, he surrendered himself to the Kailali District Court on 26 February 2018. He was sworn into office nearly a year later, on 3 January 2019. He served as a legislator until 7 March 2019 when he became automatically disqualified from office by constitutional provision that bars convicted criminals from serving as a member of the House of Representatives. He was in judicial custody for the duration of his office and therefore did not take part in any of the legislative proceedings.

== Conviction and sentence ==
On 6 March 2019, he was sentenced to life imprisonment by Kailali District Court, along with 10 other accused, for his role in the Tikapur massacre. He immediately began serving his sentence following the conviction. His party withdrew its support to the government following his conviction.

== See also ==
- Nagrik Unmukti Party, Nepal
