= 2015 Tikapur massacre =

Attack on security forces in Nepal

- Location: (Nepal) Tikapur, Kailali
- Date: 24 August 2015
- Target: Nepal Police
- Attack type: Massacre
- Weapons: axes, scythes, spears, handguns, burning alive
- Deaths: 8 (including one toddler)
- Injuries: Unknown
- Perpetrators: Resham Lal Chaudhary, Harinarayan Chaudhary, Raj Kumar Kathariya, Sundar Lal Kathariya, Brija Mohan Dagaura, Rajesh Chaudhary, Bir Bahadur Chaudhary, Pradip Chaudhary, Sitaram Chaudhary, Shrawan Chaudhary, Gangaram Dagaura Chaudhary, and many others
- Convictions: life in prison (11 people), 10 years (12 people), six months (one person)

On 24 August 2015, armed protestors affiliated with the Tharuhat Struggle Committee conducted an attack on security forces in Tikapur, a western city of Nepal. Protestors attacked officers attempting to enforce restrictions with axes, scythes, and spears killing eight, including seven police officers and a two-year-old baby. Police officer Ram Bihari Tharu was burned alive by the protestors. Supreme Court uphold the decision and decided on 16 May 2023 that Resham Lal Chaudhary should remain in prison until Falgun 13, 2094 BS. Council of Ministers of Nepal meeting held on 28 May 2023 decided to recommend Chaudhary for the presidential pardon to be granted on 29 May 2023. President of Nepal has granted pardon on 28 May 2023, to be released on 29 May 2023 on the occasion of Republic Day.

== Background ==
Minority ethnic groups had been demonstrating across Nepal, saying the new constitution, which would divide the country into seven federal states, would discriminate against them and give them insufficient autonomy.

== Convictions ==
On March 7, 2019, Kailali District Court sentenced 11 people including a member of parliament from Rastriya Janata Party Nepal, Resham Lal Chaudhary to life in prison for their roles in orchestrating and carrying out the massacre. The families of the victims expressed relief, whereas Rastriya Janata Party-Nepal objected on the grounds that the incident was political in nature, not criminal. Legislator Chaudhary is set to be stripped of his position following the sentencing. He has already begun serving his sentence. 12 others were sentenced to 10 years in prison and one accused was sentenced to six months. One of the convicts facing life sentence is due to only serve 10 years since he was a minor at the time of the incident. Three of the tried have been acquitted. More than 30 suspects are still at large.
