= Tikapur =

Tikapur टीकापुर
- Municipality (नगरपालिका)
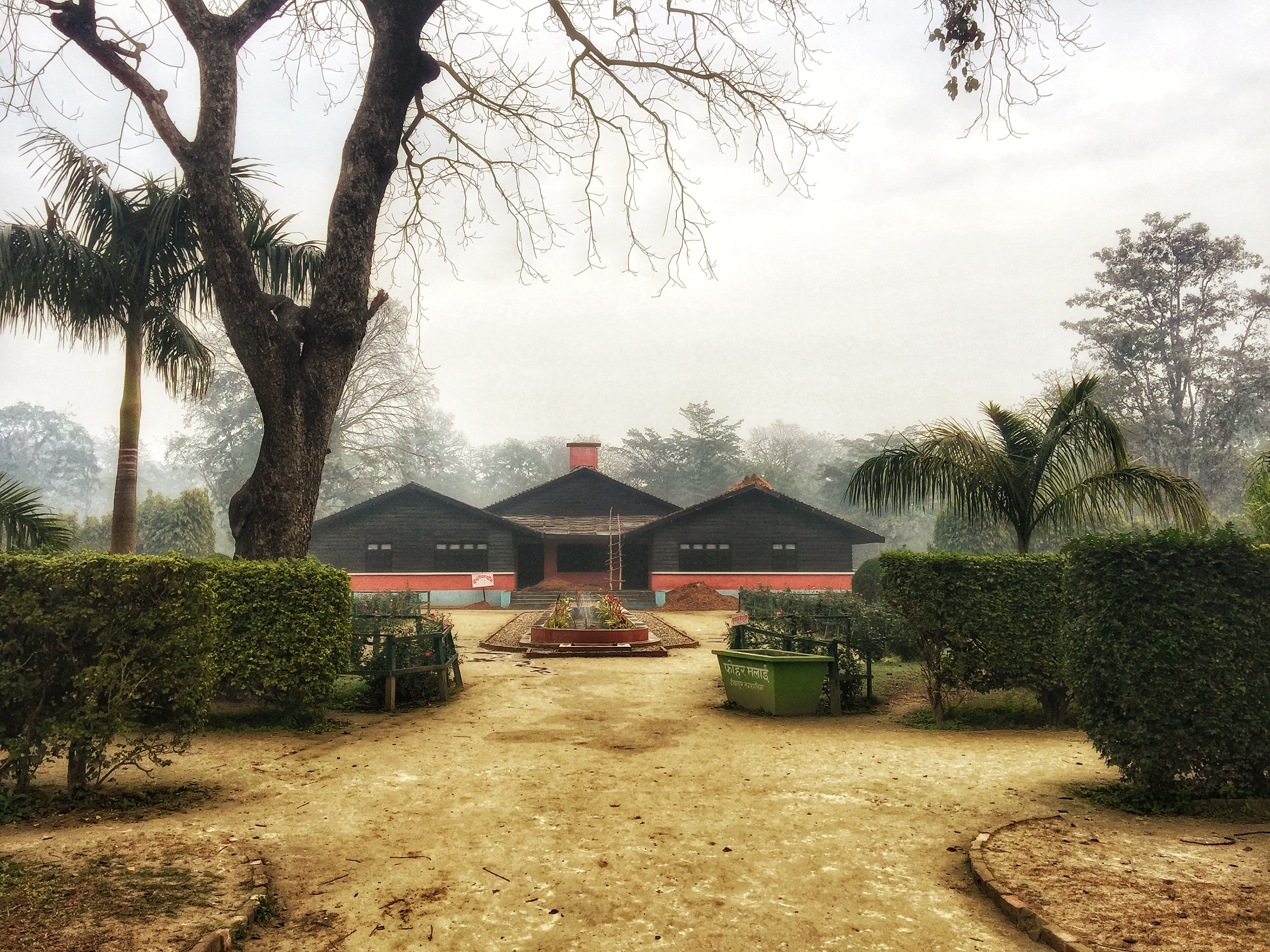
- Tikapur Park

- Location in Nepal Tikapur (Nepal)
- Coordinates: 28°31′30″N 81°07′15″E
- Country: Nepal
- Province: Sudurpashchim
- District: Kailali
- Time zone: UTC+5:45 (NST)
- Postal code: 10901
- Area code: 091
- Website: tikapurmun.gov.np

Tikapur (Nepali: टीकापुर) is a Municipality in Kailali District in Sudurpashchim Province of Nepal that was established in January 1997. Tikapur Municipality was further expanded on 10 March 2017 through merger with the two former Village development committees Narayanpur and Dansinhapur. It lies on the bank of Karnali River.

== Demographics ==
At the time of the 2011 Nepal census, Tikapur Municipality had a population of 76,940. Of these, 41.2% spoke Tharu, 36.3% Nepali, 16.4% Achhami, 1.6% Doteli, 1.5% Magar, 0.7% Hindi, 0.6% Bhojpuri, 0.5% Maithili, 0.2% Dadeldhuri, 0.2% Dailekhi, 0.2% Newar, 0.1% Jumli, 0.1% Raji, 0.1% Tamang, 0.1% Thakali, 0.1% Urdu and 0.1% other languages as their first language.

In terms of ethnicity/caste, 41.8% were Tharu, 22.6% Chhetri, 10.5% Hill Brahmin, 7.8% Kami, 4.2% Thakuri, 3.4% other Dalit, 3.1% Magar, 2.1% Damai/Dholi, 0.6% Sanyasi/Dasnami, 0.5% Lohar, 0.5% Musalman, 0.4% Mallaha, 0.4% Newar, 0.4% Sarki, 0.3% Badi, 0.2% Kurmi, 0.1% Gurung, 0.1% Kathabaniyan, 0.1% Kumal, 0.1% Meche, 0.1% Rai, 0.1% Rajbanshi, 0.1% Raji, 0.1% Tamang, 0.1% other Terai, 0.1% Thakali, 0.1% Thami and 0.1% others.

In terms of religion, 94.6% were Hindu, 4.0% Christian, 0.8% Buddhist, 0.5% Muslim and 0.1% others.

In terms of literacy, 67.1% could read and write, 2.3% could only read and 30.6% could neither read nor write.

Tikapur is 3rd largest city in Sudurpashchim Province after Dhangadhi and Bhimdutta (formerly Mahendranagar).

== Transportation ==
Tikapur Airport is an out-of-service airport that lies in Tikapur.

== Gallery ==
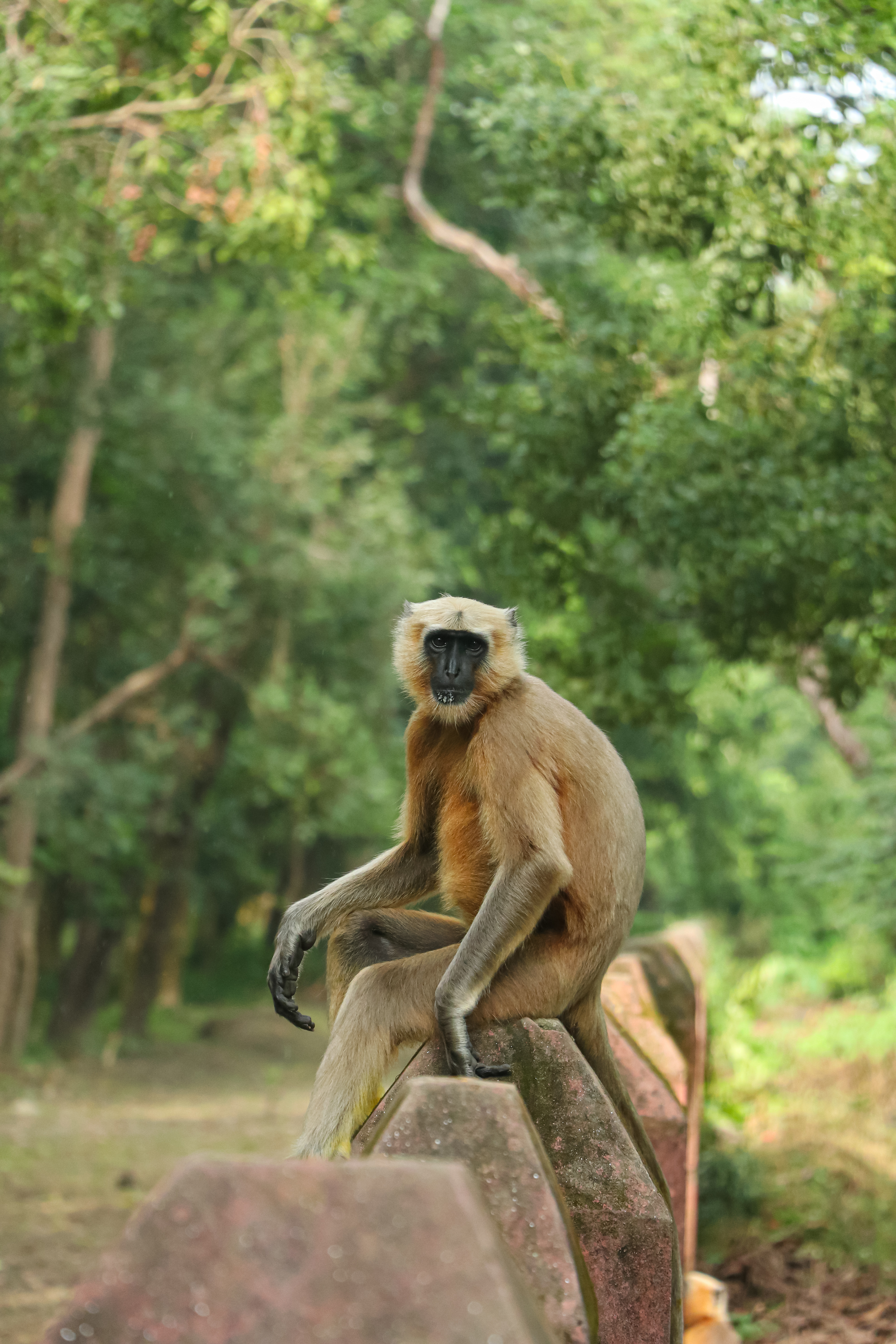
Gray Langur, Tikapur Park, Kailali

== Mayoral Election ==
Party	Votes	Status
ALISH Ale Dangaura	6969	Elected

== Deputy Mayor Election ==
Party	Candidate	Votes	Status
CPN Maoist	Khadak Bahadur Shah (खडक बहादुर शाह)	7955	Elected

== Climate ==
Climate data for Tikapur, elevation 149 m (489 ft), (1991–2020 normals)
Month	Jan	Feb	Mar	Apr	May	Jun	Jul	Aug	Sep	Oct	Nov	Dec	Year
Mean daily maximum °C (°F)	20.1 (68.2)	25.2 (77.4)	30.4 (86.7)	36.4 (97.5)	37.6 (99.7)	36.5 (97.7)	33.7 (92.7)	32.6 (90.7)	32.7 (90.9)	31.7 (89.1)	28.2 (82.8)	22.8 (73.0)	30.7 (87.2)
Daily mean °C (°F)	13.6 (56.5)	17.4 (63.3)	21.7 (71.1)	27.2 (81.0)	30.0 (86.0)	30.9 (87.6)	29.6 (85.3)	28.9 (84.0)	28.4 (83.1)	25.3 (77.5)	20.6 (69.1)	15.4 (59.7)	24.1 (75.4)
Mean daily minimum °C (°F)	7.1 (44.8)	9.5 (49.1)	12.9 (55.2)	17.9 (64.2)	22.4 (72.3)	25.3 (77.5)	25.5 (77.9)	25.1 (77.2)	24.1 (75.4)	18.8 (65.8)	13.0 (55.4)	7.9 (46.2)	17.5 (63.4)
Average precipitation mm (inches)	33.6 (1.32)	29.0 (1.14)	19.0 (0.75)	16.7 (0.66)	76.5 (3.01)	227.9 (8.97)	499.7 (19.67)	460.0 (18.11)	268.8 (10.58)	47.8 (1.88)	3.6 (0.14)	15.6 (0.61)	1,698.1 (66.85)
Source 1: Department of Hydrology and Meteorology
Source 2: JICA (precipitation)
