= 5th House of Representatives (Nepal) =

First Federal Parliament of the Federal Republic of Nepal

←	Legislature Parliament	6th HoR	→
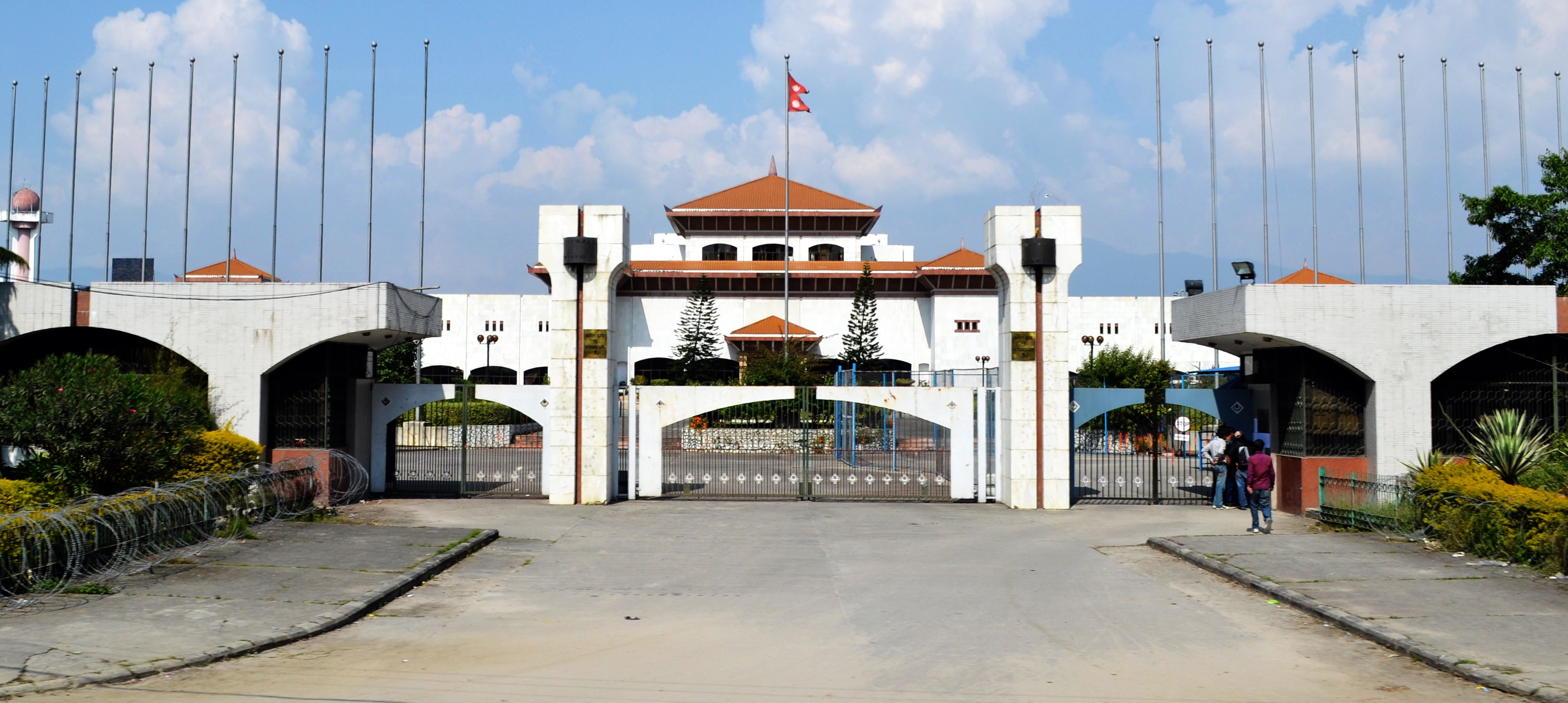
- International Convention Centre, New Baneshwor, Kathmandu

Overview
- Legislative body: Federal Parliament of Nepal
- Term: 4 March 2018 – 18 September 2022
- Election: 2017 general elections
- Government: Oli cabinet, 2018; Fifth Deuba Cabinet
- Website: www.parliament.gov.np

House of Representatives
- Members: 275
- Speaker: Krishna Bahadur Mahara (until 1 October 2019); Agni Prasad Sapkota (from 26 January 2020)
- Deputy Speaker: Shiva Maya Tumbahamphe (until 20 January 2020); Pushpa Bhusal Gautam (from 15 July 2022)
- Leader of the House: Khadga Prasad Sharma Oli, CPN (UML) (until 13 July 2021); Sher Bahadur Deuba, Congress (from 13 July 2021)
- Leader of the Opposition: Sher Bahadur Deuba, Congress (until 13 July 2021); K. P. Sharma Oli, CPN (UML) (from 13 July 2021)
- Party control: Government (158): NC: 63; CPN (MC): 49; CPN (US): 25; PSPN: 16; SPN: 5; External Support (18): LSPN: 13; Independent: 4; Opposition (93): CPN (UML): 96; Vacant (4): Vacant: 4

The 5th House of Representatives was elected via the 2017 general election. 165 members were elected via first-past-the-post system and 110 through the proportional representation system to form the 275-member House of Representatives for a five-year term.

The House of Representatives was dissolved on 20 December 2020 by President Bidya Devi Bhandari on the request of Prime Minister K. P. Sharma Oli's cabinet. The House was reinstated on 24 February 2021 following a decision by the Supreme Court of Nepal. The House was again dissolved on 22 May 2021 by President Bidya Devi Bhandari and was reinstated again on 12 July 2021 by the Supreme Court. The parliament was dissolved on 18 September 2022 after completing its five-year term.

== Leaders ==
=== Office bearers ===
- Speaker of the House of Representatives:
  - Rt. Hon. Krishna Bahadur Mahara (until 1 October 2019)
  - Rt. Hon. Agni Prasad Sapkota (from 26 January 2020)
- Deputy Speaker of the House of Representatives:
  - Hon. Shiva Maya Tumbahamphe (until 20 January 2020)
  - Hon. Pushpa Bhusal Gautam (from 15 July 2022)
- Prime Minister of Nepal:
  - Rt. Hon. K. P. Sharma Oli (until 13 July 2021) (CPN (UML))
  - Rt. Hon. Sher Bahadur Deuba (since 13 July 2021) (Nepali Congress)
- Leader of the Opposition:
  - Rt. Hon. Sher Bahadur Deuba (until 13 July 2021) (Nepali Congress)
  - Rt. Hon. K. P. Sharma Oli (since 13 July 2021) (CPN (UML))

=== Parliamentary party leaders ===
- Parliamentary party leader of Nepali Congress: Sher Bahadur Deuba
  - Deputy parliamentary party leader: Bijay Kumar Gachhadar
- Parliamentary party leader of CPN (UML): K. P. Sharma Oli
  - Deputy parliamentary party leader: Subhash Chandra Nemwang
- Parliamentary party leader of CPN (Maoist Centre): Pushpa Kamal Dahal
- Parliamentary party leader of CPN (Unified Socialist): Madhav Kumar Nepal
- Parliamentary party leader of People's Socialist Party, Nepal: Upendra Yadav
- Parliamentary party leader of Loktantrik Samajwadi Party: Mahantha Thakur

=== Whips ===
- Chief Whip (Nepali Congress):
  - Bal Krishna Khand (until 12 July 2021)
  - Chitra Lekha Yadav (from 20 July 2022)
  - Whip (Nepali Congress):
    - Pushpa Bhusal (until 15 July 2022)
    - Min Bishwakarma (from 20 July 2022)
- Chief Whip (CPN (UML)): Bishal Bhattarai
  - Whip (CPN (UML)): Shanta Chaudhary
- Chief Whip (CPN (Maoist Centre)): Dev Prasad Gurung
- Chief Whip (CPN (Unified Socialist)): Jeevan Ram Shrestha
- Chief Whip (People's Socialist Party, Nepal): Pramod Sah
- Chief Whip (Loktantrik Samajwadi Partyl): Umashankar Argariya

== Members of the House ==
5th House of Representatives

18 August 2021, after the split of Loktantrik Samajwadi Party, Nepal from People's Socialist Party, Nepal and CPN (Unified Socialist) from CPN (Unified Marxist—Leninist)

8 March 2021, after split of CPN (Unified Marxist—Leninist) and CPN (Maoist Centre) from Nepal Communist Party

23 April 2020, after the merger of Samajbadi Party, Nepal and Rastriya Janata Party Nepal

6 May 2019, after the merger of Federal Socialist Forum, Nepal and Naya Shakti Party, Nepal

17 May 2018, after the merger of CPN (Unified Marxist—Leninist) and CPN (Maoist Centre)

4 March 2018, at the time of formation

Party	After election			At dissolution			
Party	FPTH	Prop.	Total	FPTH	Prop.	Total	+/–
Registered parliamentary parties							
CPN (UML) (Note: CPN (UML) and CPN (Maoist Centre) merged to form Nepal Communist Party from 17 May 2018 to 8 March 2021)	81	41	121	68	28	96	▼25
Nepali Congress	23	40	63	23	40	62	▼1
CPN (Maoist Centre)	36	17	53	32	17	49 (Note: Including the Speaker, who does not vote on deliberations)	▼4
CPN (Unified Socialist) (Note: Split from CPN (UML) on 25 August 2021)	—	—	—	12	13	25	▲25
PSP-N (Note: Samajbadi Party and Rastriya Janata Party Nepal merged to form People's Socialist Party, Nepal on 22 April 2020)	—	—	—	13	8	19	▲19
Loktantrik Samajwadi Party, Nepal (Note: Split from People's Socialist Party, Nepal on 25 August 2021)	—	—	—	9	4	13	▲13
Nepal Socialist Party	—	—	—	2	3	5	▲5
Others							
Rastriya Prajatantra Party (Note: Represented as Independent for not meeting party threshold.)	1	—	1	1	—	1	Steady
Rastriya Janamorcha	1	—	1	1	—	1	Steady
Nepal Workers Peasants Party	1	—	1	1	—	1	Steady
Independent	1	—	1	1	—	1	Steady
Former parties							
Rastriya Janata Party Nepal	11	6	17	—	—	—	▼17
Federal Socialist Forum, Nepal (Note: Forum Nepal and Naya Shakti merged on 6 May 2019 to form Samajbadi Party)	10	6	16	—	—	—	▼16
Naya Shakti Party, Nepal	1	—	1	—	—	—	▼1
Suspended	—	—	—	3	—	3	▲3
Vacant	—	—	—	4	—	4	▲4
Total	165	110	275	161	110	271	

=== Members ===
CPN (UML) (93)
Constituency/PR group	Member	Portfolio & Responsibilities
Jhapa 5	K. P. Sharma Oli	Prime Minister of Nepal (until 13 July 2021); Leader of the Opposition (from 13 July 2021)
Ilam 2	Subas Chandra Nemwang	Deputy Parliamentary party Leader
Khotang 1	Bishal Bhattarai	Chief Whip
Tharu	Shanta Chaudhary	Whip
Chitwan 2	Krishna Bhakta Pokharel	President of Law, Justice and Human Rights Committee
Makwanpur 1	Krishna Prasad Dahal	President of Finance Committee
Khas Arya	Niru Devi Pal	President of Women and Social Committee
Jhapa 2	Pabitra Niraula Kharel	President of International Relations Committee
Dalit, Backward area	Asha Kumari B.K.	
Panchthar 1	Basanta Kumar Nemwang	
Bajhang 1	Bhairab Bahadur Singh	
Morang 3	Bhanu Bhakta Dhakal	
Achham 1	Bhim Bahadur Rawal	
Dhading 1	Bhumi Tripathi	
Myagdi 1	Bhupendra Bahadur Thapa	
Kaski 2	Bidya Bhattarai (Note: Elected from the Nepal Communist Party. Joined CPN (Unified Marxist–Leninist) after the party split.)	
Indigenous peoples	Bijay Subba	
Dalit	Bimala Bishwakarma	
Dalit	Bimala B.K.	
Indigenous peoples	Bina Kumari Shrestha	
Khas Arya	Binda Pandey	
Rupandehi 2	Bishnu Prasad Poudel	
Khas Arya	Bishnu Sharma	
Kapilvastu 2	Brijesh Kumar Gupta	
Rupandehi 1	Chabilal Bishwakarma	
Palpa 1	Dal Bahadur Rana	
Baitadi 1	Damodar Bhandari	
Surkhet 1	Dhurba Kumar Shahi	
Kanchanpur 3	Dipak Prakash Bhatta	
Sindhuli 1	Ganesh Kumar Pahadi	
Darchula 1	Ganesh Singh Thagunna	
Tharu	Ganga Chaudhary (Satgauwa)	
Morang 1	Ghanashyam Khatiwada	
Rupandehi 3	Ghanashyam Bhusal	
Gulmi 2	Gokarna Raj Bista	
Kavrepalanchok 2	Gokul Prasad Baskota	
Khas Arya	Goma Devkota	
Nawalparasi West 1	Hridayesh Tripathi	
Kathmandu 5	Ishwor Pokharel	
Kaski 3	Jagat Bahadur Sunar Bishwakarma	
Dalit	Janaki Devi Ram	
Sunsari 1	Jay Kumar Rai	
Kailali 2	Jhapat Bahadur Rawal	
Madheshi	Julie Kumari Mahato	
Tanahun 2	Kedar Sigdel	
Kaski 1	Khagaraj Adhikari	
Dhading 2	Khem Prasad Lohani	
Kathmandu 3	Krishna Bahadur Rai	
Kathmandu 9	Krishna Gopal Shrestha	
Indigenous peoples	Kumari Meche	
Morang 6	Lal Babu Pandit	
Bajura 1	Lal Bahadur Thapa	
Jhapa 4	Lal Prasad Sawa Limbu	
Siraha 3	Lila Nath Shrestha	
Bhaktapur 2	Mahesh Basnet	
Khas Arya	Maina Kumari Bhandari	
Khas Arya	Man Kumari G.C.	
Khas Arya, Backward area	Mohan Baniya	
Madheshi	Moti Lal Dugad	
Indigenous peoples	Nabina Lama	
Banke 3	Nanda Lal Roka Chhetri	
Kanchanpur 2	Nar Bahadur Dhami	
Kailali 5	Narad Muni Rana	
Nuwakot 2	Narayan Prasad Khatiwada	
Syangja 1	Narayan Prasad Marasini	
Surkhet 2	Navaraj Rawat	
Lalitpur 1	Nawaraj Silwal	
Parbat 1	Padam Giri	
Syangja 2	Padma Kumari Aryal	
Dolakha 1	Parbat Gurung	
Manang 1	Polden Chopang Gurung	
Gulmi 1	Pradip Kumar Gyawali	
Mustang 1	Prem Prasad Tulachan	
Dailekh 1	Rabindra Raj Sharma	
Khas Arya	Radha Kumari Gyawali	
Dhanusha 4	Raghu Bir Mahaseth	
Dailekh 2	Raj Bahadur Buda Chhetri	
Dhankuta 1	Rajendra Kumar Rai	
Sankhuwasabha 1	Rajendra Prasad Gautam	
Kathmandu 7	Ram Bir Manandhar	
Madheshi	Rekha Kumari Jha	
Madheshi	Sarita Kumari Giri	
Khas Arya	Sarita Neupane	
Indigenous peoples	Shanti Maya Tamang Pakhrin	
Sindhupalchok 2	Sher Bahadur Tamang	
Indigenous peoples	Shiva Maya Tumbahamphe	
Indigenous peoples	Sujita Shakya	
Chitwan 1	Surendra Prasad Pandey	
Baglung 1	Surya Prasad Pathak	
Indigenous peoples	Tham Maya Thapa	
Nawalparasi East 2	Til Bahadur Mahat Chhetri	
Khas Arya	Tirtha Gautam	
Achham 2	Yagya Bahadur Bogati	
Okhaldhunga 1	Yagya Raj Sunuwar	
Taplejung 1	Yogesh Bhattarai	

Nepali Congress (62)
Constituency/PR group	Member	Portfolio & Responsibilities
Officers of the House of Representatives
Khas Arya	Pushpa Bhushal Gautam	Deputy Speaker of the House (from 15 July 2022)
Members of Parliament
Dadeldhura 1	Sher Bahadur Deuba	Leader of the Opposition (until 13 July 2021); Prime Minister of Nepal (from 13 July 2021)
Sunsari 3	Bijay Kumar Gachhadhar	Deputy Parliamentary party Leader
Khas Arya	Bal Krishna Khand	Chief Whip
Rupandehi 5	Bharat Kumar Shah	President of Public Account Committee
Kapilvastu 3	Abhisek Pratap Shah	
Sarlahi 4	Amresh Kumar Singh	
Muslim	Atahar Kamal Musalman	
Indigenous peoples	Bahadur Singh Lama	
Kathmandu 6	Bhimshen Das Pradhan	
Dalit	Bimala Nepali	
Madheshi	Binod Kumar Chaudhary	
Madheshi	Chitra Lekha Yadav	
Rautahat 4	Dev Prasad Timilsena	
Nawalparasi West 2	Devendra Raj Kandel	
Khas Arya	Dila Sangraula	
Khas Arya	Dilendra Prasad Wadu	
Indigenous peoples	Divya Mani Rajbhandari	
Kathmandu 4	Gagan Kumar Thapa	
Sunsari 4	Gyanendra Bahadur Karki	
Indigenous peoples	Hira Gurung	
Indigenous peoples	Jeep Tshering Lama	
Indigenous peoples	Karma Ghale	
Khas Arya	Kishor Singh Rathore	
Indigenous peoples	Lal Kaji Gurung	
Dalit	Laxmi Pariyar Sewa	
Indigenous peoples	Mahendra Kumari Limbu	
Dalit	Man Bahadur Biswokarma	
Khas Arya	Meena Pandey	
Dalit	Min Bahadur Biswokarma	
Indigenous peoples	Mina Subba	
Madheshi	Minakshi Jha	
Morang 2	Minendra Prasad Rijal	
Rasuwa 1	Mohan Acharya	
Khas Arya	Mohan Prasad Pandey	
Madheshi	Nagendra Kumar Ray	
Tharu	Namita Kumari Chaudhary	
Udayapur 1	Narayan Khadka	
Tharu	Padma Narayan Chaudhary	
Tharu	Parvati D.C. Chaudhary	
Siraha 1	Pradip Giri	
Kathmandu 1	Prakash Man Singh	
Dalit	Prakash Rasaili	
Indigenous peoples	Pramila Rai	
Rupandehi 4	Pramod Kumar Yadav	
Kathmandu 10	Rajendra Kumar K.C.	
Khas Arya, Backward area	Rangamati Shahi	
Khas Arya, Backward area	Ram Bahadur Bista	
Bardiya 1	Sanjay Kumar Gautam	
Muslim	Sarvat Aara Khanam	
Khas Arya	Satya Narayan Khanal	
Nawalparasi East 1	Shashank Koirala	
Madheshi	Sita Devi Yadav	
Sunsari 2	Sitaram Mahato	
Madheshi	Smriti Narayan Chaudhary	
Khas Arya	Sujata Koirala	
Dalit	Sujata Pariyar	
Indigenous peoples	Subarna Jwarchan	
Saptari 4	Teju Lal Chaudhary	
Khas Arya	Uma Regmi	
Bara 1	Umakanta Chaudhary	
Indigenous peoples	Umesh Shrestha	

CPN (Maoist Centre) (49)
Constituency/PR group	Member	Portfolio & Responsibilities
Officers of the House of Representatives
Sindhupalchok 1	Agni Prasad Sapkota	Speaker of the House
Members of Parliament
Chitwan 3	Puhspa Kamal Dahal	Parliamentary party Leader
Lamjung 1	Dev Prasad Gurung	Chief Whip
Indigenous peoples	Jayapuri Gharti Magar	President of Education and Health Committee
Khas Arya	Purna Kumari Subedi	President of Agriculture, Cooperative and Natural Resources Committee
Morang 4	Aman Lal Modi	
Indigenous peoples	Amrita Thapa	
Dalit	Anjana Bisankhe	
Rolpa 1	Barsha Man Pun	
Kanchanpur 1	Bina Magar	
Madheshi	Bodh Maya Yadav	
Kapilvastu 1	Chakrapani Khanal	
Muslim	Chand Tara Kumari	
Khas Arya, Disabled	Chudamani Khadka	
Baglung 2	Devendra Paudel	
Khas Arya	Dharma Sheela Chapagain	
Madheshi	Dil Kumari	
Kalikot 1	Durga Bahadur Rawat	
Dalit	Durga Kumari B.K.	
Jumla 1	Gajendra Bahadur Mahat	
Kavrepalanchok 1	Ganga Bahadur Tamang	
Mahottari 1	Giriraj Mani Pokharel	
Gorkha 1	Hari Raj Adhikari	
Sindhuli 2	Haribol Prasad Gajurel	
Solukhumbu 1	Hem Kumar Rai	
Nuwakot 1	Hit Bahadur Tamang	
Madheshi	Indu Sharma	
Western Rukum 1	Janardhan Sharma	
Rukum East 1	Kamala Roka	
Dang 2	Krishna Bahadur Mahara	
Banke 1	Maheshwar Jung Gahatraj	
Dhanusha 1	Matrika Prasad Yadav	
Indigenous peoples	Onsari Gharti Magar	
Lalitpur 3	Pampha Bhushal	
Tharu	Ram Kumari Chaudhary	
Sarlahi 3	Rameshwar Raya Yadav	
Khas Arya	Rekha Sharma	
Khas Arya	Satya Pahadi	
Jajarkot 1	Shakti Bahadur Basnet	
Bardiya 2	Sant Kumar Tharu	
Indigenous peoples	Shashi Shrestha	
Morang 5	Shiva Kumar Mandal	
Ramechhap 1	Shyam Kumar Shrestha	
Bhojpur 1	Sudan Kirati	
Jhapa 1	Surendra Kumar Karki	
Siraha 2	Suresh Chandra Das	
Udayapur 2	Suresh Kumar Rai	
Salyan 1	Tek Bahadur Basnet	
Indigenous peoples	Yashoda Gurung Subedi	

CPN (Unified Socialist) (25)
Constituency/PR group	Member	Portfolio & Responsibilities
Kathmandu 2	Madhav Kumar Nepal	Parliamentary party Leader
Kathmandu 8	Jeevan Ram Shrestha	Chief Whip
Khas Arya	Kalyani Kumari Khadka	President of Development and Technology Committee
Dalit	Nira Devi Jairu	President of State Direction Principle, Rules and Responsibility Committee
Tehrathum 1	Bhawani Prasad Khapung	
Indigenous peoples	Bina Devi Budhathoki Magar	
Makwanpur 2	Birodh Khatiwada	
Dolpa 1	Dhan Bahadur Buda	
Mugu 1	Gopal Bahadur Bam	
Dang 3	Hira Chandra K.C.	
Ilam 1	Jhala Nath Khanal	
Muslim	Kalila Khatun	
Tanahun 1	Krishna Kumar Shrestha	
Lalitpur 2	Krishna Lal Maharjan	
Tharu	Laxmi Kumari Chaudhary	
Dang 1	Metmani Chaudhary	
Khas Arya	Maya Devi Neupane	
Khas Arya	Mukunda Neupane	
Dalit	Parbati Kumari Bisunkhe	
Doti 1	Prem Bahadur Ale	
Madheshi	Pushpa Kumari Karna Kayasta	
Indigenous peoples	Ram Kumari Jhankri	
Muslim	Samina Hussein	
Madheshi	Sarala Kumari Yadav	
Palpa 2	Som Prasad Pandey	
Indigenous peoples	Tulsi Thapa	

People's Socialist Party, Nepal (19)
Constituency/PR group	Member	Portfolio & Responsibilities
Saptari 2	Upendra Yadav (Note: Elected from Federal Socialist Forum, Nepal)	Parliamentary party Leader
Sarlahi 1	Pramod Sah (Note: Elected from Rastriya Janata Party Nepal)	Chief Whip
Indigenous peoples	Amrita Agrahari	
Gorkha 2	Baburam Bhattarai (Note: Elected from Naya Shakti Party, Nepal)	
Khas Arya	Lila Devi Sitaula	
Sarlahi 2	Mahindra Ray Yadav	
Banke 2	Mohammad Estiyak Rai	
Khas Arya	Nar Maya Dhakal	
Parsa 1	Pradeep Yadav	
Siraha 4	Raj Kishor Yadav	
Indigenous peoples	Rajendra Prasad Shrestha	
Bara 2	Ram Sahaya Yadav	
Bara 3	Rambabu Kumar Yadav	
Indigenous peoples	Rani Mandal	
Madheshi	Renu Kumari Yadav	
Indigenous peoples	Renuka Gurung	
Muslim	Ruhi Naaj	
Mahottari 4	Surendra Kumar Yadav	
Saptari 1	Surya Narayan Yadav	

Loktantrik Samajwadi Party (13)
Constituency/PR group	Member	Portfolio & Responsibilities
Mahottari 3	Mahanta Thakur	Parliamentary party Leader
Dhanusha 2	Uma Shankar Aragriya	Chief Whip
Parsa 2	Bimal Prasad Shrivastav	President of Industry, Commerce, Labour and Consumer Interest Committee
Parsa 4	Laxman Lal Karna	President of Parliamentary Hearing Committee
Rautahat 1	Anil Kumar Jha	
Madheshi	Chanda Chaudhary	
Saptari 3	Chandra Kanta Chaudhary	
Dalit	Dulari Devi Khanga	
Bara 4	Iqbal Miya	
Dalit	Kalu Devi Biswokarma	
Khas Arya	Nirjala Raut	
Dhanusha 3	Rajendra Mahato	
Mahottari 2	Sharat Singh Bhandari	

Rastriya Prajatantra Party (1)
Constituency/PR group	Member	Portfolio & Responsibilities
Jhapa 3	Rajendra Prasad Lingden	

Rastriya Janamorcha (1)
Constituency/PR group	Member	Portfolio & Responsibilities
Pyuthan 1	Durga Poudel	

Nepal Majdoor Kisan Party (1)
Constituency/PR group	Member	Portfolio & Responsibilities
Bhaktapur 1	Prem Suwal	

Independent (1)
Constituency/PR group	Member	Portfolio & Responsibilities
Humla 1	Chakka Bahadur Lama	

=== Suspensions ===
Constituency/PR group	Name	Party	Date of suspension	Reason
Kailali 1	Resham Lal Chaudhary	RJPN	3 January 2019	Suspended following murder charges
Parsa 3	Hari Narayan Rauniyar	Forum Nepal	8 October 2019	Suspendend following graft charges
Rautahat 2	Mohammad Aftab Alam	Congress	14 October 2019	Suspended following murder charges

=== Changes ===
By-elections are held for seats that become vacant or members elected through proportional representation are replaced from the party list.

Constituency/PR group	Incumbent				Replacement			
Constituency/PR group	Name	Party	Date vacated	Reason	Name	Party	Date elected	Change
Kaski 2	Rabindra Prasad Adhikari	NCP (Note: Elected from Communist Party of Nepal (Unified Marxist–Leninist))	27 February 2019	Death	Bidya Bhattarai	NCP	30 November 2019	By-election
Indigenous peoples	Gyan Kumari Chantyal	Congress	1 July 2020	Death	Subarna Jwarchan	Congress	19 July 2020	List
Khas Arya	Sarita Giri	PSP-N	9 July 2020	Sacked for disobeying party whip	Lila Devi Sitaula	PSP-N	29 July 2020	List
Dalit	Sanu Siva	CPN (UML)	14 October 2020	Death	Janaki Devi Ram	CPN (UML)	4 April 2021	List
Khas Arya	Surya Bahadur K.C.	Congress	4 November 2020	Death	Mohan Prasad Pandey	Congress	23 November 2020	List
Kailali 3	Gauri Shankar Chaudhary	Maoist Centre	8 April 2021	Expelled for joining CPN (UML)				
Arghakhanchi 1	Top Bahadur Rayamajhi	Maoist Centre	8 April 2021	Expelled for joining CPN (UML)				
Kailali 4	Lekh Raj Bhatta	Maoist Centre	8 April 2021	Expelled for joining CPN (UML)				
Rautahat 3	Prabhu Sah	Maoist Centre	8 April 2021	Expelled for joining CPN (UML)				

=== Defections ===
Name	Constituency/PR group	Date	From	To
Bhawani Prasad Khapung	Tehrathum 1	25 August 2021	CPN (UML)	Unified Socialist
Bina Devi Budhathoki Magar	Indigenous peoples	25 August 2021	CPN (UML)	Unified Socialist
Birodh Khatiwada	Makwanpur 2	25 August 2021	CPN (UML)	Unified Socialist
Dhan Bahadur Buda	Dolpa 1	25 August 2021	CPN (UML)	Unified Socialist
Gopal Bahadur Bam	Mugu 1	25 August 2021	CPN (UML)	Unified Socialist
Hira Chandra K.C.	Dang 3	25 August 2021	CPN (UML)	Unified Socialist
Jhala Nath Khanal	Ilam 1	25 August 2021	CPN (UML)	Unified Socialist
Jeevan Ram Shrestha	Kathmandu 8	25 August 2021	CPN (UML)	Unified Socialist
Kalila Khatun	Muslim	25 August 2021	CPN (UML)	Unified Socialist
Kalyani Kumari Khadka	Khas Arya	25 August 2021	CPN (UML)	Unified Socialist
Krishna Kumar Shrestha	Tanahun 1	25 August 2021	CPN (UML)	Unified Socialist
Krishna Lal Maharjan	Lalitpur 2	25 August 2021	CPN (UML)	Unified Socialist
Laxmi Kumari Chaudhary	Tharu	25 August 2021	CPN (UML)	Unified Socialist
Madhav Kumar Nepal	Kathmandu 2	25 August 2021	CPN (UML)	Unified Socialist
Matmani Chaudhary	Dang 1	25 August 2021	CPN (UML)	Unified Socialist
Maya Devi Neupane	Khas Arya	25 August 2021	CPN (UML)	Unified Socialist
Mukunda Neupane	Khas Arya	25 August 2021	CPN (UML)	Unified Socialist
Nira Devi Jairu	Dalit	25 August 2021	CPN (UML)	Unified Socialist
Parvati Kumari Bisungkhe	Dalit	25 August 2021	CPN (UML)	Unified Socialist
Prem Bahadur Ale	Doti 1	25 August 2021	CPN (UML)	Unified Socialist
Pushpa Kumari Karna Kayasta	Madheshi	25 August 2021	CPN (UML)	Unified Socialist
Ram Kumari Jhankri	Indigenous peoples	25 August 2021	CPN (UML)	Unified Socialist
Samina Hussein	Muslim	25 August 2021	CPN (UML)	Unified Socialist
Sarala Kumari Yadav	Madheshi	25 August 2021	CPN (UML)	Unified Socialist
Som Prasad Pandey	Palpa 2	25 August 2021	CPN (UML)	Unified Socialist
Tulsi Thapa	Indigenous peoples	25 August 2021	CPN (UML)	Unified Socialist
Anil Kumar Jha	Rautahat 1	25 August 2021	PSP-N	Loktantrik Samajwadi
Bimal Prasad Shrivastav	Parsa 2	25 August 2021	PSP-N	Loktantrik Samajwadi
Chanda Chaudhary	Madheshi	25 August 2021	PSP-N	Loktantrik Samajwadi
Chandra Kanta Chaudhary	Saptari 3	25 August 2021	PSP-N	Loktantrik Samajwadi
Dulari Devi Khanga	Dalit	25 August 2021	PSP-N	Loktantrik Samajwadi
Iqbal Miya	Bara 4	25 August 2021	PSP-N	Loktantrik Samajwadi
Kalu Devi Biswokarma	Dalit	25 August 2021	PSP-N	Loktantrik Samajwadi
Laxman Lal Karna	Parsa 4	25 August 2021	PSP-N	Loktantrik Samajwadi
Mahanta Thakur	Mahottari 3	25 August 2021	PSP-N	Loktantrik Samajwadi
Nirjala Raut	Khas Arya	25 August 2021	PSP-N	Loktantrik Samajwadi
Rajendra Mahato	Dhanusha 3	25 August 2021	PSP-N	Loktantrik Samajwadi
Sharat Singh Bhandari	Mahottari 2	25 August 2021	PSP-N	Loktantrik Samajwadi
Uma Shankar Aragriya	Dhanusha 2	25 August 2021	PSP-N	Loktantrik Samajwadi
