= Lila Devi Sitaula =

Nepalese politician

- लिला देवी सिटौला

Member of Parliament, Pratinidhi Sabha for People's Socialist Party list
- In office 29 July 2020 – 2022

Personal details
- Born: January 30, 1972 (age 54) Jhapa District
- Party: People's Socialist Party

Lila Devi Sitaula is a Nepalese politician, belonging to the People's Socialist Party, Nepal formerly serving as the member of the 1st Federal Parliament of Nepal. In the 2017 Nepalese general election, she was elected as a proportional representative from Khas Arya category. She was elected as replacement of Sarita Kumari Giri, who was expelled from the parliament for defying the party's whip.
