= Dulari =

Dulari may refer to:

- Dulari, Nepal
- Dulari (film), a 1949 Indian Hindi-language film
- Dulari (actress) (1927-2013), Indian actress, active in Hindi cinema from 1947-1993
- Dulari Bibi, 1933 Indian film
- Dulari Devi (disambiguation)
- Dulari Qureshi, Indian art historian

== See also ==
- Dulaara (disambiguation)
