= Kathmandu 10 =

Parliamentary constituency in Nepal

- Parliamentary constituency for the House of Representatives
- Kathmandu 10 in Bagmati Province

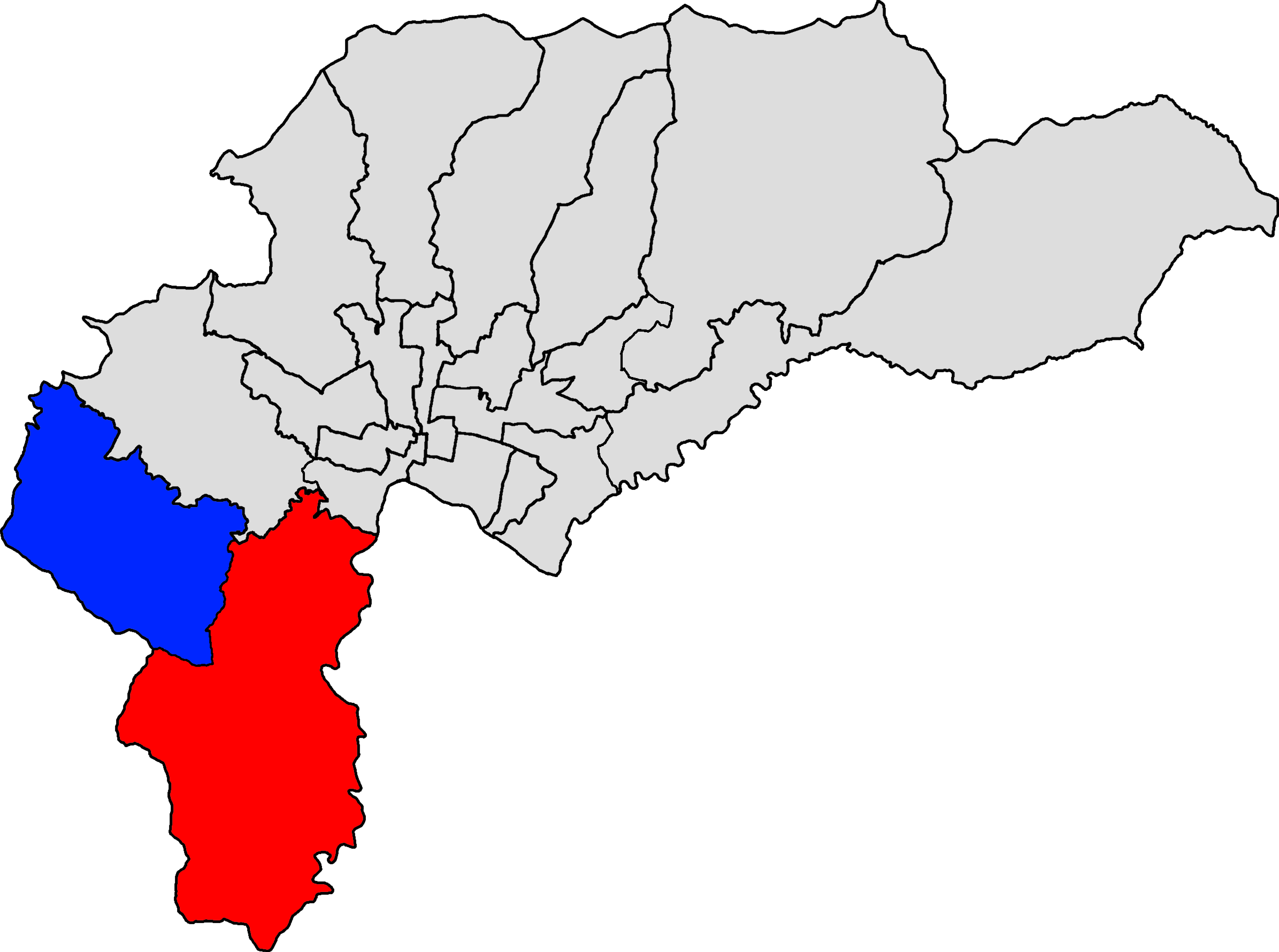
- Assembly segment Kathmandu 10(A) (red) and Kathmandu 10(B) (blue) within Kathmandu District
- Province: Bagmati Province
- District: Kathmandu District
- Electorate: 71,201

Current constituency
- Created: 2008
- Party: Rastriya Swatantra Party
- Member of Parliament: Pradip Bista

Kathmandu 10 is one of 10 parliamentary constituencies of Kathmandu District in Nepal. This constituency came into existence on the Constituency Delimitation Commission (CDC) report submitted on 31 August 2017.

== Incorporated areas ==
Kathmandu 10 parliamentary constituency consists of Dakshinkali Municipality, Kirtipur Municipality and wards 2, 3, 4, 5, 6, 7, 8, 9, 10 and 11 of Chandragiri Municipality.

== Assembly segments ==
It encompasses the following Bagmati Province Provincial Assembly segment

- Kathmandu 10(A)
- Kathmandu 10(B)

== Members of Parliament ==
=== Parliament/Constituent Assembly ===
Election	Candidate	Party
2008	Pushpa Kamal Dahal	CPN (Maoist)
January 2009	Pushpa Kamal Dahal	UCPN (Maoist)
2013	Rajendra Kumar KC	Nepali Congress
2017	Rajendra Kumar KC	Nepali Congress
2022	Rajendra Kumar KC	Nepali Congress
2026	Pradip Bista	Rastriya Swatantra Party

=== Provincial Assembly ===
==== 10(A) ====
Election	Member	Party
2017	Pukar Maharjan	Nepali Congress

==== 10(B) ====
Election	Member	Party
2017	Ram Ale Magar	CPN (Unified Marxist–Leninist)
May 2018	Ram Ale Magar	Nepal Communist Party
March 2021	Ram Ale Magar	CPN (Unified Marxist–Leninist)
August 2021	Ram Ale Magar	CPN (Unified Socialist)

== Election results ==
=== Election in the 2020s ===
==== 2022 general election ====
Candidate	Party	Votes	%
Rajendra Kumar KC	Nepali Congress	14,463	28.27
Himesh K.C.	CPN (UML)	11,791	23.05
Pradip Bista	Rastriya Swatantra Party	8,739	17.08
Balram Thapa	Rastriya Prajatantra Party	6,959	13.60
Anjana Bisankhe	CPN (Maoist Centre)	5,265	10.29
Narayan Maharjan	Nepal Workers Peasants Party	1,884	3.68
Others		2,054	4.02
Total		51,155	100.00
Majority		2,672	
Nepali Congress hold			

=== Election in the 2010s ===
==== 2017 legislative elections ====
Party	Candidate	Votes
Nepali Congress	Rajendra Kumar KC	24,190
CPN (Maoist Centre)	Hit Man Shakya	21,907
Bibeksheel Sajha Party	Pradeep Dhakal	2,003
CPN (Marxist–Leninist)	Krishna Kumar Shrestha	1,757
Naya Shakti Party, Nepal	Pancha Lal Maharjan	1,195
Others		2,289
Invalid votes		1,769
Result	Congress hold	
Source: Election Commission

==== 2017 Nepalese provincial elections ====
===== Kathmandu 10(A) =====
Party	Candidate	Votes
Nepali Congress	Pukar Maharjan	14,729
Communist Party of Nepal (Maoist Centre)	Dilip Maharjan	13,717
Janasamajbadi Party Nepal	Shyam Kumar Adhikari	2,193
Bibeksheel Sajha Party	Dev Bahadur Maharjan	1,809
Naya Shakti Party, Nepal	Kesh Ratna Bajracharya	1,401
Others		1,172
Invalid votes		1,081
Result	Congress gain	
Source: Election Commission

===== Kathmandu 10(B) =====
Party	Candidate	Votes
CPN (Unified Marxist–Leninist)	Ram Ale Magar	9,903
Nepali Congress	Dharma Nanda Shrestha	7,017
Others		1,584
Invalid votes		493
Result	CPN (UML) gain	
Source: Election Commission

==== 2013 Constituent Assembly election ====
Party	Candidate	Votes
Nepali Congress	Rajendra Kumar KC	20,392
CPN (Unified Marxist–Leninist)	Surendra Manandhar	13,619
UCPN (Maoist)	Pushpa Kamal Dahal	12,859
Rastriya Prajatantra Party Nepal	Dhruv Maharjan	2,029
Invalid votes		2,218
Result	Congress gain	
Source: Election Commission

=== Election in the 2000s ===
==== 2008 Constituent Assembly election ====
Party	Candidate	Votes
CPN (Maoist)	Pushpa Kamal Dahal	23,277
Nepali Congress	Rajendra Kumar KC	12,154
CPN (Unified Marxist–Leninist)	Sanu Kumar Shrestha	8,568
Rastriya Prajatantra Party	Madan Thapa Magar	1,564
Others		1,962
Invalid votes		1,720
Result	Maoist gain	
Source: Election Commission

== See also ==
- List of parliamentary constituencies of Nepal
