= Namita =

Namita is a given name. Notable people with the given name include:

- Namita Kumari Chaudhary, Nepali politician
- Namita Kumari Dali (born 1991), Nepalese footballer
- Namita D'souza (born 2003), Indian-born cricketer
- Namita Dubey, Indian actress
- Namita Gokhale (born 1956), Indian fiction writer, editor, festival director, and publisher
- Namita Gupta Wiggers, American expert in the field of contemporary craft, curator, educator, and writer
- Namita Mundada (born 1989), Indian politician
- Namita Saha, Indian politician
- Namita Thapar (born 1977), Indian entrepreneur, business executive, and angel investor
- Namita Toppo (born 1995), Indian field hockey player
- Namita Waikar, Indian novelist, entrepreneur, and journalist
