= Samina Hussein =

Nepalese politician

- समीना हुसेन

Member of Parliament, Pratinidhi Sabha for CPN (UML) party list
- Incumbent
- Assumed office 4 March 2018

Personal details
- Born: January 12, 1981 (age 45)
- Party: CPN (Unified Socialist)
- Other political affiliations: CPN (UML)

Samina Hussein is a Nepalese politician, belonging to the Communist Party of Nepal (Unified Socialist) currently serving as a member of the 1st Federal Parliament of Nepal. In the 2017 Nepalese general election she was elected as a proportional representative from the Muslim category.
