= Sarawat Aara Khanam Halwaini =

Nepalese politician

- सरवत आरा खानम हलवाईनी

Member of Parliament, Pratinidhi Sabha for Nepali Congress party list
- Incumbent
- Assumed office 4 March 2018

Personal details
- Born: September 12, 1963 (age 62)
- Party: Nepali Congress

Sarawat Aara Khanam Halwaini is a Nepalese politician, belonging to the Nepali Congress who is currently serving as a member of the 1st Federal Parliament of Nepal. In the 2017 Nepalese general election he was elected as a proportional representative from the Muslim category.
