= Til Bahadur Mahat Chhetri =

Nepalese politician

- तिल बहादुर महत क्षेत्री

Member of Parliament, Pratinidhi Sabha
- In office 4 March 2018 – 18 September 2022
- Preceded by: Constituency created
- Constituency: Nawalparasi East 2

Personal details
- Born: 25 May 1964 (age 61)
- Party: CPN (UML)

Til Bahadur Mahat Chhetri is a Nepalese politician, belonging to the Nepal Communist Party currently serving as the member of the 1st Federal Parliament of Nepal. In the 2017 Nepalese general election he was elected from the Nawalparasi East 2 constituency, securing 39053(49.85%) votes. He was defeated by Manish Khanal of the Rastriya Swatantra Party in 2026 general election.
