= Nawalparasi (Bardaghat Susta East) 2 =

Parliamentary constituency in Nepal

- Parliamentary constituency for the House of Representatives
- Nawalpur 2 in Gandaki Province; Protected areas in green

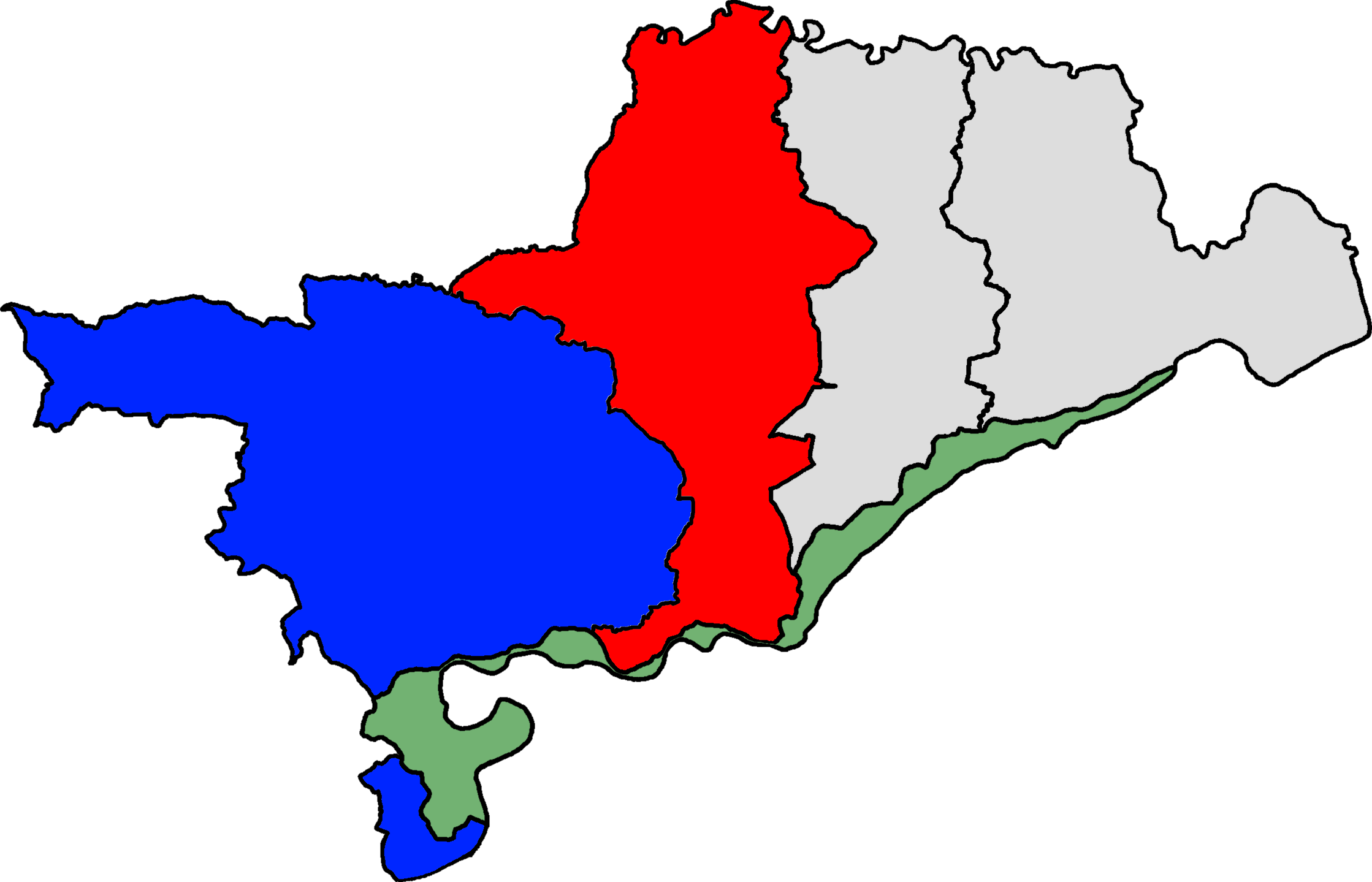
- Assembly segments Nawalpur 2(A) and Nawalpur 2(B) within Nawalpur District; Protected areas in green
- Province: Gandaki Province
- District: Nawalpur District
- Electorate: 107,767

Current constituency
- Created: 2017
- Party: Rastriya Swatantra Party
- MP: Manish Khanal
- Gandaki MPA 2(A): Bishnu Prasad Lamichhane (NC)
- Gandaki MPA 2(B): Janak Lal Shrestha (NCP)

Nawalparasi (Bardaghat Susta East) 2 is one of two parliamentary constituencies of Nawalpur District in Nepal. This constituency came into existence on the Constituency Delimitation Commission (CDC) report submitted on 31 August 2017.

== Incorporated areas ==
Nawalparasi (Bardaghat Susta East) 2 incorporates Bungdikali Rural Municipality, Hupsekot Rural Municipality, Madhyabindu Municipality, Binayi Tribeni Rural Municipality and wards 3, 4, 14, 15, 16 and 17 of Kawasoti Municipality.

== Assembly segments ==
It encompasses the following Gandaki Provincial Assembly segment

- Nawalparasi (Bardaghat Susta East) 2(A)
- Nawalparasi (Bardaghat Susta East) 2(B)

== Members of Parliament ==
=== Parliament/Constituent Assembly ===
Election	Member	Party
2017	Til Bahadur Mahat Chhetri	CPN (Unified Marxist–Leninist)
May 2018	Til Bahadur Mahat Chhetri	Nepal Communist Party
March 2021	Til Bahadur Mahat Chhetri	CPN (Unified Marxist–Leninist)
2022	Bishnu Kumar Karki	Nepali Congress
2026	Manish Khanal	Rastriya Swatantra Party

=== Provincial Assembly ===
==== 2(A) ====
Election	Member	Party
2022	Padma GC Shrestha	CPN (Unified Marxist-Leninist)

==== 2(B) ====
Election	Member	Party
2017	Janak Lal Shrestha	CPN (Unified Marxist–Leninist)
May 2018	Janak Lal Shrestha	Nepal Communist Party

== Election results ==
=== Election in the 2020s ===
==== 2022 general election ====
Candidate	Party	Votes	%
Bishnu Kumar Karki	Nepali Congress	36,132	44.27
Til Bahadur Mahat Chhetri	CPN (UML)	34,110	41.79
Shalik Ram Neupane	Rastriya Swatantra Party	6,449	7.90
Bishnu Prasad Sharma	Rastriya Prajatantra Party	3,246	3.98
Others		1,689	2.07
Total		81,626	100.00
Majority		2,022	
Nepali Congress gain			

==== 2022 provincial election ====
===== 2(A) =====
Candidate	Party	Votes	%
Padma G.C.	CPN (UML)	19,396	47.02
Saugam Kumar Sirpali B.K.	CPN (Maoist Centre)	14,758	35.77
Nun Bahadur Ale Magar	Rastriya Prajatantra Party	4,000	9.70
Yadunath Sigdel	Hamro Nepali Party	1,281	3.11
Others	1,819	4.41	
Total		41,254	100.00
Majority		4,638	
CPN (UML)			

===== 2(B) =====
Candidate	Party	Votes	%
Laxman Bahadur Pandey	CPN (UML)	18,822	45.59
Gopal Prasad Khanal	CPN (Unified Socialist)	14,776	35.79
Bhoj Bahadur Thapa	Rastriya Prajatantra Party	4,862	11.78
Mohan Bahadur Singh Baakbal	Rastriya Janamukti Party	1,161	2.81
Yuvaraj Kumal	Nagrik Unmukti Party	791	1.92
Others	870	2.11	
Total		41,282	100.00
Majority		4,046	
CPN (UML)			

=== Election in the 2010s ===
==== 2017 legislative elections ====
Party	Candidate	Votes
CPN (Unified Marxist–Leninist)	Til Bahadur Mahat Chhettri	39,053
Nepali Congress	Bishnu Kumar Karki	37,720
Others		1,575
Result	CPN (UML) gain	
Source: Election Commission

==== 2017 Nepalese provincial elections ====
===== 2(A) =====
Party	Candidate	Votes
Nepali Congress	Bishnu Prasad Lamichhane	19,222
CPN (Maoist Centre)	Bal Krishna Gaire	18,161
Others		1,952
Result	Congress gain	
Source: Election Commission

===== 2(B) =====
Party	Candidate	Votes
CPN (Unified Marxist–Leninist)	Janak Lal Shrestha	19,376
Nepali Congress	Ganesh Man Shrestha	19,047
Others		899
Result	CPN (UML) gain	
Source: Election Commission

== See also ==
- List of parliamentary constituencies of Nepal
