= Maina Kumari Bhandari =

Nepali politician

- मैना कुमारी भण्डारी

Member of Parliament, Pratinidhi Sabha for CPN (UML) party list
- In office 4 March 2018 – 18 September 2022

Personal details
- Born: 12 October 1959 (age 66)
- Party: CPN (UML)

Maina Kumari Bhandari (née Bista) (born October 1, 1958) is a Nepali communist politician and a member of the House of Representatives of the federal parliament of Nepal.

== Personal life ==
She was born on October 1, 1958, in Juniya-7 of Gulmi, to Bhakta Bahadur and Chandra Kala Bista. She is educated up to the proficiency certification level. She was a schoolteacher for 25 years, before retiring in 2008.

== Political career ==
She joined politics as a student in 1980, joining ANNFSU, the student wing of the then CPN ML, later CPN UML. As of 2013, she was the Lumbini "Incharge" of All Nepal Women Association, the women wing of CPN UML, as well as the central member of the party.

She was the CPN UML candidate for Gulmi-1 constituency in the 2008 as well as the 2013 constituent assembly elections.

In the 2017 legislative election, she was elected to parliament under the proportional representation system from CPN UML of the left alliance, now Nepal Communist Party (NCP), filling the reserved seat for women and Khas-Arya groups.
