= Satya Narayan Khanal =

Nepalese politician

Satya Narayan Sharma Khanal
- सत्य नारायण शर्मा खनाल

Member of Parliament, Pratinidhi Sabha for Nepali Congress party list
- Incumbent
- Assumed office 4 March 2018

Personal details
- Born: February 1, 1947 (age 79)
- Party: Nepali Congress

Satya Narayan Khanal is a Nepalese politician, belonging to the Nepali Congress currently serving as the member of the 1st Federal Parliament of Nepal. In the 2017 Nepalese general election he was elected as a proportional representative.
