= Sarala Kumari Yadav =

Nepalese politician

- सरला कुमारी यादव

Member of Parliament, Pratinidhi Sabha for CPN (UML) party list
- Incumbent
- Assumed office 4 March 2018

Member of Constituent Assembly for CPN (UML) party list
- In office 28 May 2008 – 28 May 2012

Personal details
- Born: 17 December 1965 (age 60)
- Party: CPN (Unified Socialist)
- Other party: CPN (UML)

Sarala Kumari Yadav is a Nepalese politician, belonging to the Communist Party of Nepal (Unified Socialist) currently serving as the member of the 1st Federal Parliament of Nepal. In the 2017 Nepalese general election she was elected as a proportional representative from Madheshi category.
