= Asha Kumari =

Asha Kumari may refer to:

- Asha Kumari (forced convert), Hindu Pakistani student forced to convert to Islam
- Asha Kumari (politician), Indian politician
- Asha Kumari B.K., Nepali politician
