= Tulsi Thapa =

Nepalese politician

Honourable Tulsi Thapa
- तुल्सी थापा

Member of Parliament, Pratinidhi Sabha for CPN (UML) party list
- Incumbent
- Assumed office 4 March 2018
- President: Bidya Devi Bhandari
- Prime Minister: Sher Bahadur Deuba

Personal details
- Born: 4 November 1954 (age 71)
- Party: CPN (Unity National Campaign) (Since 2021)
- Other party: CPN (UML)
- Spouse: Bam Dev Gautam
- Children: 3
- Parents: Pahal Singh Thapa (father); Bhim Kumari Thapa (mother)

Tulsi Thapa is a Nepalese politician, belonging to the Nepal Communist Party currently serving as the member of the 1st Federal Parliament of Nepal. In the 2017 Nepalese general election she was elected as a proportional representative from Indigenous peoples category.
