= Sanu =

Sanu may refer to:

- Sanu, Iran, village in the Razavi Khorasan Province, Iran
- Serbian Academy of Sciences and Arts (SANU), an academic institution in Serbia
- Sudan African National Union, a political party in Sudan
- South American native ungulates (SANUs), prehistoric hoofed mammals of South America
- Sanu railway station, a railway station in India

== People ==
People with Sanu as first name

- Sanu Sharma, Australian writer of Nepalese nationality
- Sanu Sherpa, Nepalese mountaineer
- Sanu Siva Nepalese politician
- Sanu Varghese, Indian cinematographer

People with Sanu as middle name

- Zinat Sanu Swagata, Bangladeshi actress

People with Sanu as last name

- Kumar Sanu (born 1957), Indian singer
- M. K. Sanu (1928-2025), Malayali writer, critic, retired professor, biographer, journalist, orator, social activist, and human rights activist.
- Mohamed Sanu (born 1989), American American football player
- V. P. Sanu Indian politician
- Yaqub Sanu (1839-1912), Egyptian journalist, nationalist and playwright
