= Shanti Maya Tamang Pakhrin =

Nepalese politician

- शान्ती माया तामांग पाख्रिन

Member of Parliament, Pratinidhi Sabha for CPN (UML) party list
- In office 4 March 2018 – 18 September 2022

Member of Constituent Assembly for CPN (UML) party list
- In office 28 May 2008 – 28 May 2012

Personal details
- Born: December 12, 1978 (age 47)
- Party: CPN (UML)

Shanti Maya Tamang Pakhrin is a Nepalese politician, belonging to the Nepal Communist Party currently serving as the member of the 1st Federal Parliament of Nepal. In the 2017 Nepalese general election she was elected as a proportional representative from the Indigenous peoples category.
