= Parbati Kumari Bisunkhe =

Nepali politician

- पार्वती कुमारी विशुन्के

Member of Parliament, Pratinidhi Sabha for CPN (UML) party list
- Incumbent
- Assumed office 4 March 2018
- President: Bidya Devi Bhandari
- Prime Minister: Sher Bahadur Deuba

Personal details
- Born: 4 October 1986 (age 39)
- Party: CPN (Unified Socialist)
- Other party: CPN (UML)

Parbati Kumari Bisunkhe (also spelled Parvati, Parbatikumari and Bisungkhe) is a Nepali communist politician and a member of the House of Representatives of the federal parliament of Nepal. Elected under the proportional representation system from CPN UML, she represents Communist Party of Nepal (Unified Socialist) in the parliament. She is an influential politician in Dailekh District.

== Personal life ==
She was born to Jasudha Sharki and Kawiram Sharki. She belongs to the Dalit community. She has an education of up to the graduate level.

== Political career ==
She has been active in politics and activism in Dailekh, the district of her permanent residence. She has been felicitated for Dalit rights activism. Politically, she was affiliated with CPN UML until 2018 when it merged with CPN (Maoist Centre) to form Nepal Communist Party (NCP). She became the provincial committee member for NCP after its formation. In October 2019, she was a part of the group that rebelled against the party and established parallel organising committees at the local levels of Karnali Province. In the party, she is thought to be affiliated with the Madhav Kumar Nepal faction.

== Parliamentarian ==
In the 2017 legislative election, she was elected under the proportional representation system from CPN UML. She took her oath of office on 4 March 2018 along with her colleagues from senior parliamentarian, Mahantha Thakur. Following the merger of CPN UML with CPN (Maoist Centre) on 18 May 2018, she represents the newly formed Nepal Communist Party in parliament. She is a member of the parliamentary Public Accounts Committee.

In August 2018, she was one of the 22 lawmakers who pushed for the Resolution motion to end violence against women, which would direct the government to initiate awareness programs including by modifying school textbooks. That same month, she also sought revisions to the Nepal Citizenship (First Amendment) Bill to end discriminatory provisions against receiving the citizenship certificate in one's mother's name. She has demanded action against perpetrators of violence against women in public spaces. In May 2019, Nayapatrika Daily named her as one of the few parliamentarians that had accessed the Parliamentary Secretariat Library, which, according to the paper, contains 40,000 books but is rarely visited by the parliamentarians.
