= Subarna Jwarchan =

Nepalese politician

- सुवर्ण ज्वारचन

Member of Parliament, Pratinidhi Sabha for Nepali Congress party list
- Incumbent
- Assumed office 19 July 2020

Member of Constituent Assembly for Nepali Congress party list
- In office 21 January 2014 – 14 October 2017

Personal details
- Born: 11 April 1946 (age 80) Gulmi District
- Party: Nepali Congress

Subarna Jwarchan is a Nepalese politician currently serving as a member of parliament at the House of Representatives for Nepali Congress as a list MP. She was elected to the parliament as a replacement for Gyan Kumari Chhantyal who had died.
