= Sanu Siva =

Nepalese politician (died 2020)

- President: Bidya Devi Bhandari
- Prime Minister: KP Sharma Oli

Personal details
- Party: Nepal Communist Party

Sanu Siva was a Nepalese politician, belonging to the Nepal Communist Party currently serving as the member of the 1st Federal Parliament of Nepal. In the 2017 Nepalese general election she was elected as a proportional representative from Dalit category.

She died in 2020 due to health complications related to kidney and heart. She was also a central member of the People's Cultural Federation and has sung more than 25 songs. She has a son and a daughter.
