= Sarita Kumari Giri =

Nepalese politician

- सरिता कुमारी गिरी

Member of Parliament, Pratinidhi Sabha for CPN (UML) party list
- In office 4 March 2018 – 18 September 2022

Personal details
- Born: September 3, 1973 (age 52)
- Party: CPN (UML)

Sarita Kumari Giri is a Nepalese politician, belonging to the Nepal Communist Party currently serving as the member of the 1st Federal Parliament of Nepal. In the 2017 Nepalese general election she was elected as a proportional representative from Madheshi category.
