= Mahendra Kumari Limbu =

Nepali politician

- महेन्द्र कुमारी लिम्बु

Member of Parliament, Pratinidhi Sabha for Nepali Congress party list
- Incumbent
- Assumed office 4 March 2018

Member of Constituent Assembly for Nepali Congress party list
- In office 21 January 2014 – 14 October 2017

Personal details
- Born: 14 August 1959 (age 66)
- Party: Nepali Congress

Mahendra Kumari Limbu is a Nepali politician and a member of the House of Representatives of the federal parliament of Nepal. She was elected in the 2017 legislative election under the proportional representation system from Nepali Congress, filling the reserved seat for women and indigenous groups. She is also a member of the Law, Justice and Human Rights Committee of the parliament. In the Nepali Congress shadow cabinet, she is a member of the Ministry of Home Affairs.
