= Kholegaun Khanigaun =

Kholegaun Khanigaun खानीगाउँ
- Village development committee
- Location in Nepal
- Coordinates: 27.54°N 85.12°E
- Country: Nepal
- Zone: Bagmati Zone
- District: Nuwakot District

Population (1991)
  - Total: 4,824
- Time zone: UTC+5:45 (Nepal Time)

Kholegaun Khanigaun is a village development committee in Nuwakot District in the Bagmati Zone of central Nepal. At the time of the 1991 Nepal census, it had a population of 4824 people living in 938 individual households.

== Notable people ==
- Binda Pandey (1966-), politician and feminist.
