= Manish Khanal =

Nepalese politician

The Honourable Manish Khanal
- मनिष खनाल

Member of Parliament, Pratinidhi Sabha
- Incumbent
- Assumed office 26 March 2026
- Preceded by: Bishnu Kumar Karki
- Constituency: Nawalpur 2

Personal details
- Citizenship: Nepalese
- Party: Rastriya Swatantra Party
- Education: Nepal Law Campus (LLB)
- Profession: Politician

Manish Khanal (Nepali: मनिष खनाल) is a Nepalese politician serving as a member of parliament from the Rastriya Swatantra Party. He is the member of the 7th Pratinidhi Sabha elected from Nawalpur 2 constituency in 2026 Nepalese General Election securing 41,347 votes and defeating his closest contender Til Bahadur Mahat of the CPN UML. He holds a LLB from Nepal Law Campus.
