= Bishnu Kumar Karki =

Nepalese politician

Honourable Bishnu Kumar Karki
- विष्णु कुमार कार्की

Member of Parliament, Pratinidhi Sabha
- In office 22 December 2022 – 12 September 2025
- Succeeded by: Manish Khanal
- Constituency: Nawalpur 2

Personal details
- Born: 30 September 1963 (age 62) Rupandehi District
- Party: Nepali Congress
- Spouse: Madhu Karki
- Parent: Shyam Bahadur Karki (father)

Bishnu Kumar Karki is a Nepalese politician, belonging to the Nepali Congress currently serving as a member of the 2nd Federal Parliament of Nepal. In the 2022 Nepalese general election, he won the election from Nawalparasi (Bardaghat Susta East) 2 (constituency).
