= Dulaara =

Dulaara may refer to:

- Dulaara (1994 film), an Indian Hindi-language mystery thriller comedy film

== See also ==
- Dulari (disambiguation)
