= Dulari Devi =

Dulari Devi may refer to:

- Dulari Devi (politician), Nepalese politician
- Dulari Devi (artist), Indian folk artist of the Madhubani painting style

== See also ==
- Dulari Devi Khatweni, Nepali politician
