= Pradip Bista =

Nepalese politician

- प्रदिप बिस्ट

Member of Parliament, Pratinidhi Sabha
- Incumbent
- Assumed office 26 March 2026
- Preceded by: Rajendra Kumar KC
- Constituency: Kathmandu 10

Personal details
- Citizenship: Nepalese
- Party: Rastriya Swatantra Party
- Profession: Politician

Pradip Bista (Note: Nepali: प्रदिप बिस्ट) is a Nepalese politician serving as a member of parliament from the Rastriya Swatantra Party. He is the member of the 7th Pratinidhi Sabha elected from Kathmandu 10 constituency in 2026 Nepalese General Election securing 37,469 votes and defeating Himal Karki of the Nepali Congress.
