= Women's representation in the Parliament of Nepal =

Women's representation in the Parliament of Nepal has increased in the 1st Nepalese Constituent Assembly, which may have affected the drafting of the Constitution of Nepal.

== Brief political history ==
The autocratic Rana regime lasted for about 104 years (1846–1951) in Nepal followed by a brief 18 months of parliamentary democracy in 1959–1960. However, late King Mahendra dissolved the parliament and took all the state power by himself and introduced a party-less Panchayat System, which lasted 30 years. In 1990, a pro-democracy movement forced late King Birendra to dissolve the one party system, lift the ban on political parties, and return the sovereignty to the people. Nepal once again adopted a multi-party parliamentary system under the Constitution of the Kingdom of Nepal in 1990. But once again, parliament was dissolved by the then King Gyanendra on May 22, 2002 and introduced direct rule under his chairmanship in 2005. A successful second peoples' movement in 2006 followed by Constituent Assembly (CA) elections of 2008 finally declared Nepal as a Federal Democratic Republic and ended centuries old monarchy on May 28, 2008. Nepal held four general parliamentary elections in 1959, 1991, 1994 and 1999 and Constituent Assembly (CA) elections in 2008.

== Women's participation in politics ==
Traditionally, Nepali women had limited role in political leadership. However, time and again they became active and have significantly contributed in bringing political changes in Nepal. Women's participation in Nepali politics surfaced in the revolt against the oligarchy Rana regime in 1951. For protesting against the undemocratic royal proclamation of 1960, a group of women organizations openly waved black flags in a public procession and were imprisoned. Women's active participation in politics was noted later in the 1990 People's Movement where women from various regions and ideologies significantly contributed in the success for abolishing the one party system and establishing the multiparty democratic system in the country. Similarly, hundreds of thousands of women collectively participated in 2nd people movement in 2006 resulting in the demolition of monarchy and declaration of Nepal as a Federal Democratic Republic.

== Women representation in Parliament under the four parliamentary elections ==
In the first Parliamentary elections of 1959, the entire 6 women candidate lost the election. As a result of the compulsory provision of the 1990 Constitution that requires at least five percent women's candidature in the election for House of Representatives, the numbers of women candidates in the last three parliamentary elections held in 1991, 1994 and 1999 were gradually increased with a number of 81 (party candidate 73 and 8 independent), 86 (party candidate 74 and 12 independent) and 143 (party candidate 117 and 26 independent) respectively. But out of the total 205 seats only 6 (2.9%,), 7 (3.4%), and 12 (5.8%) women were elected (only the party candidates) respectively in 1991, 1994 and 1999.

== Constituent Assembly elections, 2008 and Women's Representations ==
Nepali women's representation in the legislative body (Legislature-Parliament), however, was dramatically increased to 32.8% through the Constituent Assembly (CA) Election held in 2008. In the election, 191 women leaders (33.2%) were elected out of 575 seats, and Cabinet nominated 6 women out of 26 seats, resulting to 197 women members (32.8%) in the Legislative parliament. As a result, Nepal stands on the 14th position globally to send the women leaders in the legislature parliament. The reason behind the drastic change in the women's representation is due to the reservation of seats provided through the Interim Constitution of Nepal, 2007.

== Political environment ==
Even though the voices for substantive representation of women in the decision-making bodies were raised time and again by the women's rights groups as well as by the politically active women, the demand was echoed after the successful second People's Movement, which resulted in the reinstatement of the dissolved Parliament by the then King Gyanendra through a national proclamation on April 24, 2006. The reinstated parliament in May 2006 declared to end all forms of discrimination and ensure the inclusive democracy in future. A peace agreement was signed on November 21, 2006, between the government and the Maoist which further led the foundation for inclusive democracy and increased participation of women in National Politics. Following to this, a twelve-point agreement between the 7 political parties' alliance and the Maoists on November 22, 2005 is also considered as the beginning of political and social transformation in Nepal.

== Legal provision ==
Further to this, the Interim Constitution of Nepal, 2007 was promulgated on January 15, 2007, which pursued a state policy of making special provision based on positive discrimination to the various groups including women (article 35 (14) of the Interim constitution). In specific to political representation, Article 63 of the Interim Constitution enshrine the principle of inclusiveness while selecting the candidates by the political parties and to ensure proportional representation of women, Dalit, oppressed tribes/indigenous tribes, backwards, Madhesi and other groups. Whatsoever, in case of women, at least one third of total representation should be obtained.

A mixed electoral system was adopted for the Constituent Assembly (CA) elections. Out of the total 601 seats, 240 members were to be elected through the First past the Post (FPTP) system from single member constituencies, 335 members through the Proportional Representation (PR) system considering Nepal as a single constituency and remaining 26 members were to be nominated by the Interim Council of Ministers.

== Proportional representation: key to Success ==
The proportional representation (PR) system played a prominent role in increasing the representation of women in the CA of Nepal. Under the PR system, political parties were mandated to include 50 percent women in candidacy in their closed list. Beyond the candidacy, Election Commission also issued mandatory order that the 50 percent must be maintained in selection process or out of the total seats won, 50 percent women must be selected, the non-fulfillment such requirement by the parties otherwise would lead for losing their winning seat. There was no minimum requirement for the political parties to fill women candidacy for the FPTP race. However, for political parties, which were having candidates in both FPTP and PR, were required to fulfill an additional inclusiveness quota requirement with regard to women. They must fill at least one-third women candidates in total. For example, if a party fills a total of 575 candidates, it must fill at least 191 women candidates from both the systems and a minimum of 167 in the PR system and 24 in the FPTP system.

== Representation from all sectors ==
In the process of CA election, appropriate consideration was also paid with regard to the division of classes and the history of exclusion of its major ethnic groups in the nation building process. To make the CA inclusive and to give equal opportunity to all the ethnic communities, additional requirements were made to ensure the representation of all the sectors of the community. The Constituent Assembly Member Election Act, 2007 divided the seats under PR within the five major groups based on their existing population, which included Madhesi (31.2%), Dalits (13%), indigenous (37.8), backward regions (4%), and others (30.2%). Once again to ensure the representation of women from all these sub-groups, it was mandated that from each group 50 percent must be women.

== Final result ==
As an outcome of the effort to bring all sections of the society, including women, in the Constitution making process, the CA election helped Nepal to enter in a new dimension of inclusive political development. Even though, through the FPTP system out of the 240 seats, only 30 (12.5%) women were elected, through the PR system, out of 335 seats, 161 (48.05%) women were elected (due to the flexibility given to choose from any sex in case of a party win only one seat results were not fully fifty/fifty percent). As a result, 197 women (almost 33%) is now part of the process of Constitution making process as well as a member of the Legislative Parliament. The victory goes beyond the women's representation because these women members represent various ethnic backgrounds culture, and geographical regions of Nepal.
