= Bina Shrestha =

Nepali lawmaker

Bina Kumari Shrestha
- बिना कुमारी श्रेष्ठ

Member of Parliament, Pratinidhi Sabha for CPN (UML) party list
- In office 4 March 2018 – 18 September 2022

Personal details
- Born: August 21, 1957 (age 68) Kathmandu
- Party: CPN UML

Bina Kumari Shrestha (Nepali: बिना कुमारी श्रेष्ठ) is a Nepali politician and a member of the House of Representatives of the federal parliament of Nepal. She was elected under the proportional representation system from CPN UML, filling the reservation seat for indigenous groups as well as women. She is also a member of the parliamentary Development and Technology Committee.
