= Rekha Kumari Jha =

Nepali politician

- रेखा कुमारी झा

Member of Parliament, Pratinidhi Sabha for CPN (UML) party list
- In office 4 March 2018 – 18 September 2022

Personal details
- Born: 17 August 1975 (age 50)
- Party: CPN (UML)

Rekha Kumari Jha is a Nepali politician and a member of the House of Representatives of the federal parliament of Nepal. She was elected from CPN UML under the proportional representation system filling the seat reserved for women and madhesi groups.
