= Juniya =

Juniya जुनियाँ
- Village Development Committee
- Location in Nepal
- Coordinates: 28.06°N 83.41°E
- Country: Nepal
- Zone: Lumbini Zone
- District: Gulmi District

Government

Population (1991)
  - Total: 2,827
- Time zone: UTC+5:45 (Nepal Time)
- Website: www.sunilmarling.blogspot.com & www.juniyanews.blogspot.com

Juniya is a village and VDC in Gulmi District in the Lumbini Zone of western Nepal. It is surrounded by Johang VDC in the south and East, Bharse in the north and Rupakot VDC in the west. This VDC is located in a wonderful geographical location that is with high hills Lek and low hills Besi. At the time of the 1991 Nepal census it had a population of 2827 persons living in 568 individual households.
