= Maya Devi Neupane =

Nepali politician

- मायादेवी न्यौपाने

Member of Parliament, Pratinidhi Sabha for CPN (UML) party list
- Incumbent
- Assumed office 4 March 2018

Personal details
- Born: 16 May 1958 (age 68)
- Party: CPN (Unified Socialist)
- Other party: CPN (UML)

Maya Devi Neupane (or Mayadevi Neupane) is a Nepali communist politician and a member of the House of Representatives of the federal parliament of Nepal. She was elected from CPN UML under the Proportional representation system.
