= Nirjala Raut =

Nepali politician

- निर्जला राउत

Member of Parliament, Pratinidhi Sabha for Rastriya Janata Party list
- Incumbent
- Assumed office 4 March 2018

Member of Constituent Assembly for Rastriya Madhesh Samajwadi Party list
- In office 21 January 2014 – 14 October 2017

Personal details
- Born: 14 October 1968 (age 58)
- Party: Loktantrik Samajwadi
- Other political affiliations: RMSP; RJPN

Nirjala Raut is a Nepalese politician and a member of the House of Representatives of the federal parliament of Nepal. She was elected under the proportional representation system from Rastriya Janata Party Nepal. She is also a member of the parliamentary International Relations Committee. Previously, she was also a member of the second constituent assembly, also elected under the proportional representation system, from Rastriya Madhes Samajwadi Party.
