= Asha Kumari B.K. =

Nepali politician

- आशा कुमारी वि.क.

Member of Parliament, Pratinidhi Sabha for CPN (UML) party list
- In office 4 March 2018 – 18 September 2022

Personal details
- Born: 16 October 1981 (age 44)
- Citizenship: Nepal
- Party: CPN (Unified Marxist–Leninist) (2004–2018, 2021–present)
- Other party: Nepal Communist Party (2018–2021)
- Spouse: Govinda Kami
- Children: 2
- Parents: Ai Bahadur Sunar (father); Kharimaya B.K. (mother)

Asha Kumari B.K. (Nepali: आशा कुमारी वि.क.) is a Nepali politician that serves as a member of the House of Representatives in the 1st Federal Parliament of Nepal. She was elected under the Dalit/Backward area reservation from the party list submitted by the CPN (Unified Marxist–Leninist).

== Political career ==
She was a member of the Development and Technology Committee of the House of Representatives during her term.
