= Chudamani Khadka =

Nepali politician

- चुडामणी खड्का

Member of Parliament, Pratinidhi Sabha for CPN (Maoist Centre) party list
- Incumbent
- Assumed office 4 March 2018

Personal details
- Born: 18 May 1977 (age 48)
- Party: CPN (Maoist Centre)

Chudamani Khadka is a Nepali politician and a member of the House of Representatives of the federal parliament of Nepal. He was elected under the proportional representation system from CPN (Maoist Center). He is also a member of the House Finance Committee. He used to be a personal aide to Pushpa Kamal Dahal before his election to parliament.
