= Bishnu Sharma =

Nepali politician

- विष्णु शर्मा

Member of Parliament, Pratinidhi Sabha for CPN (UML) party list
- In office 4 March 2018 – 18 September 2022

Personal details
- Born: 1955 (age 70–71)
- Party: CPN (UML)

Bishnu Sharma is a Nepali politician and a member of the House of Representatives of the federal parliament of Nepal. She was elected under the proportional representation system from CPN UML, filling the reservation seat for Khas Arya group as well as women.
