= Chand Tara Kumari =

Nepali politician

- चाँद तारा कुमारी

Member of Parliament, Pratinidhi Sabha for CPN (Maoist Centre) Party List
- Incumbent
- Assumed office 4 March 2018

Personal details
- Born: 30 September 1968 (age 57)
- Party: CPN (Maoist Centre)
- Other party: MJF-N; TMLP

Chand Tara Kumari is a Nepali politician and a member of the House of Representatives of the federal parliament of Nepal. She is also a member of the International Committee of the House.
