= Kumari Meche =

Nepali politician

- कुमारी मेचे

Member of Parliament, Pratinidhi Sabha for CPN (UML) party list
- In office 4 March 2018 – 18 September 2022

Personal details
- Born: 27 June 1964 (age 62)
- Party: CPN (Unified Marxist–Leninist)
- Spouse: Kadamlal Meche
- Children: 3
- Parents: Sano Bishulal Meche (father); Dul Meche (mother)

Kumari Meche (Nepali: कुमारी मेचे) is a Nepali communist politician and a member of the House of Representatives of the federal parliament of Nepal. She was elected from CPN UML under the proportional representation system against the reserved seats for women and indigenous groups. She represents Nepal Communist Party (NCP), the party formed by the merger of CPN UML with CPN (Maoist Centre), in the parliament. She is a member of the House Women and Social Committee.
