= Shanta Chaudhary =

Nepali politician

- शान्ता चौधरी

Member of Parliament, Pratinidhi Sabha for CPN (UML) party list
- In office 4 March 2018 – 18 September 2022

Member of Parliament, Pratinidhi Sabha for CPN (UML) party list
- In office 28 May 2008 – 28 May 2012

Personal details
- Born: 17 May 1979 (age 47)
- Party: CPN (UML)

Shanta Chaudhary (Nepali: शान्ता चौधरी) is a social reformer and former member of 1st Constituent Assembly of Nepal as a proportional representative from CPN (UML) party. Chaudhary was a forced child labourer as part of the, now abandoned, Kamlari system.

== Biography ==
Chaudhary was forced to become a Kamlari when she was eight. She was leased for Rs 7,000 a year by her parents who had nine other children. She was sent to work for a family in Dang. During this time, she was forced to work for 19 hours a day, and she lived in the cowshed. She was reprimanded for her mistakes and sometimes beaten by the landlord's wife. Chaudhary remained as a servant until she was eighteen, during which time she became active in politics. She represented Dang in a forum for the lands rights movement.

In 2008, Chaudhary was chosen to lead the Parliamentary Committee on Natural Resources and Means. Her illiteracy was a problem in the CA and she started taking classes. Eventually, in 2013, she published a book, Kamlari Dekhi Sabhasad Samma, about her experiences.

In 2016, she was diagnosed with uterine cancer and is currently receiving treatment.
