= Lal Kaji Gurung =

Nepali politician

- लालकाजी गुरुङ

Member of Parliament, Pratinidhi Sabha for Nepali Congress party list
- Incumbent
- Assumed office 4 March 2018

Personal details
- Born: April 1, 1949 (age 77) Parbat District
- Party: Nepali Congress

Lal Kaji Gurung (also Lalkaji Gurung) is a Nepali politician and a member of the House of Representatives of the federal parliament of Nepal. He was elected under the proportional representation system from Nepali Congress filling the reserved seat for indigenous groups. In the shadow cabinet formed by Nepali Congress, he is a member of the Ministry of Federal Affairs and General Administration.
