= Goma Devkota =

Nepali politician

- गोमा देवकोटा

Member of Parliament, Pratinidhi Sabha for CPN (UML) party list
- In office 4 March 2018 – 18 September 2022

Member of Parliament, Rastriya Sabha
- In office 27 June 1997 – 26 June 2003
- Constituency: Central Region

Personal details
- Born: 20 May 1950 (age 76)
- Party: CPN UML

Goma Devkota (Nepali: गोमा देवकोटा) (née Karki) is a Nepali politician and a member of the House of Representatives of the federal parliament of Nepal. She was elected from CPN UML through the proportional representation system, filling the reservation seat for women as well as Khas Arya group.

She was born in Sindhuli to Bhakta Kumari Karki and Jay Bahadur Karki. She studied up to the SLC level. She was married to the communist revolutionary Late. Rishi Devkota (Azad).
