= Niru Devi Pal =

Nepali politician

- निरु देवी पल

Member of Parliament, Pratinidhi Sabha for CPN (UML) party list
- In office 4 March 2018 – 18 September 2022

Personal details
- Born: 25 August 1971 (age 54)
- Party: CPN (UML)

Niru Devi Pal (also Neeru) is a Nepali communist politician and a member of the House of Representatives of the federal parliament of Nepal. She was elected under the proportional representation system from CPN UML filling the reserved seat for women, for Kanchanpur district. Representing the newly formed Nepal Communist Party (NCP) in the parliament, she also chairs the parliamentary Women and Social Committee.

She was allegedly threatened by a group of people when out grocery-shopping in Mid-Baneshwar on July 31, 2018. A large number of police personnel had been mobilised and as many as 75 had been arrested for further investigation by August 2, 16 of whom had been held, post preliminary screening. There was no further progress reported on the case, and by mid-November, there were reports that the whole incident was a hoax.
