= Bina Devi Budhathoki =

Nepali politician

- विना देवी बुढाथोकी

Member of Parliament, Pratinidhi Sabha for CPN (UML) party list
- Incumbent
- Assumed office 4 March 2018

Personal details
- Born: September 26, 1970 (age 55)
- Party: CPN (Unified Socialist)
- Other party: CPN (UML)

Bina Devi Budhathoki Magar is a Nepali politician and a member of the House of Representatives of the federal parliament of Nepal. She was elected to parliament under the proportional representation system from CPN (Unified Socialist). She is also a member of the Public Account Committee of the parliament.
