= Dil Kumari =

Nepali politician

- दिल कुमारी

Member of Parliament, Pratinidhi Sabha for CPN (Maoist Centre) party list
- Incumbent
- Assumed office 4 March 2018

Personal details
- Born: 1973 (age 52–53)
- Party: CPN (Maoist Centre)

Dil Kumari (Nepali: दिल कुमारी) is a Nepali politician and a member of the House of Representatives of the federal parliament of Nepal. She is also a member of the House Industry, Commerce, Labour and Consumer Interest Committee. She is a member of Nepal Communist Party (NCP).
