= Kalila Khatun =

Nepali politician

- कलिला खातुन
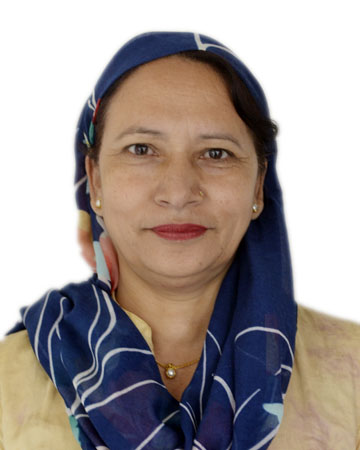

Member of Parliament, Pratinidhi Sabha for CPN (Unified Socialist) party list
- Incumbent
- Assumed office 4 March 2018

Personal details
- Born: 29 December 1965 (age 60)
- Party: CPN (Unified Socialist)
- Other party: CPN (UML)
- Spouse: Habib Khan
- Children: 4
- Parents: Amin Bakas (father); Nil Kumari Miya (mother)

Kalila Khatun (Nepali: कलिला खातुन), also Kalila Khan, is a Nepali communist politician and a member of the House of Representatives of the federal parliament of Nepal. She was elected under the proportional representation system from CPN UML, filling the reservation seat for women as well as Muslim groups. She is a member of the parliamentary Women and Social Welfare Committee representing the newly formed Communist Party of Nepal (Unified Socialist).
