= Bimala Nepali =

Nepali lawmaker

- बिमला नेपाली

Member of Parliament, Pratinidhi Sabha for Nepali Congress party list
- Incumbent
- Assumed office 4 March 2018

Member of Constituent Assembly for Nepali Congress party list
- In office 28 May 2008 – 28 May 2012

Personal details
- Born: 5 December 1978 (age 47) Dang District, Nepal
- Party: Nepali Congress

Bimala Nepali (Nepali: बिमला नेपाली) is a Nepali politician and a member of the House of Representatives of the federal parliament of Nepal. She was elected through the proportional representation system from Nepali Congress.
