= Nabina Lama =

Nepali politician

- नविना लामा

Member of Parliament, Pratinidhi Sabha for CPN (UML) party list
- In office 4 March 2018 – 18 September 2022

Personal details
- Born: 8 February 1983 (age 43) Kavrepalanchok District
- Party: CPN UML

Nabina Lama is a Nepali communist politician and a member of the House of Representatives of the federal parliament of Nepal. She was elected under the proportional representation system from CPN UML, filling the reserved seat for women and indigenous groups.

In 2016, she was elected to the chair of All Nepal National Free Students Union (ANNFSU), the student wing of CPN UML, for a two-year term.
