= Mina Subba =

Nepali politician

- मिना सुब्बा

Member of Parliament, Pratinidhi Sabha for Nepali Congress party list
- Incumbent
- Assumed office 4 March 2018

Personal details
- Born: 1 December 1955 (age 70) Sunsari District
- Party: Nepali Congress

Mina Subba (also Meena Subba) is a Nepali politician and a member of the House of Representatives of the federal parliament of Nepal. She was elected under the proportional representation system from Nepali Congress, filling the reserved seat for women and indigenous groups. She is a member of the House Public Accounts Committee. She is also a member of the Ministry of Water Supply in the shadow cabinet formed by the main opposition party, Nepali Congress.
