= Rani Mandal =

Nepali politician

- रानी मण्डल

Member of Parliament, Pratinidhi Sabha for Rastriya Janta Party list
- In office 4 March 2018 – 2022

Personal details
- Born: 30 May 1974 (age 52)
- Party: People's Socialist Party
- Other party: Rastriya Janata Party

Rani Mandal is a Nepali politician and a former member of the House of Representatives of the federal parliament of Nepal. She was elected from Rastriya Janata Party Nepal under the proportional representation system. She is a member of the parliamentary Women and Social Welfare Committee.
