= Hira Gurung =

Nepalese politician

- हिरा गुरुङ

Member of Parliament, Pratinidhi Sabha for Nepali Congress party list
- Incumbent
- Assumed office 4 March 2018

Member of Constituent Assembly for Nepali Congress party list
- In office 28 May 2008 – 28 May 2012

Personal details
- Born: September 13, 1968 (age 58)
- Party: Nepali Congress

Hira Gurung is a Nepalese politician and a member of the House of Representatives of the federal parliament of Nepal. He was elected through proportional representation system from Nepali Congress. In the shadow cabinet formed by Nepali Congress, he is a member of Ministry of Women, Children and Senior Citizens.
