= Nira Devi Jairu =

Nepali politician

- निरा देवी जैरु

Member of Parliament, Pratinidhi Sabha for CPN (UML) party list
- Incumbent
- Assumed office 4 March 2018

Personal details
- Born: 19 January 1977 (age 49)
- Party: CPN (Unified Socialist)
- Other party: CPN (UML)

Nira Devi Jairu is a Nepali communist politician and a member of the House of Representatives of the federal parliament of Nepal. She was elected under the proportional representation system from CPN UML, filling the reserved seat for women group. She currently represents the newly formed Nepal Communist Party (NCP) in parliament, where she also chairs the Parliamentary Committee on Implementation, Monitoring and Evaluation of State's Directive Principles, Policies and Responsibilities. She was also appointed the "Co-Incharge" of Dadeldhura district for NCP.
