= Binda Pandey =

Nepali politician

- विन्दा पाण्डे
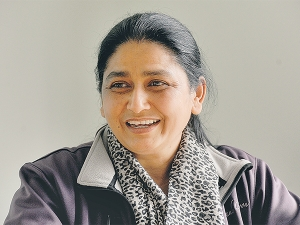
- Binda Pandey in 2018

Member of Standing Committee
- In office December 2021 – Onward

Personal details
- Born: December 30, 1966 (age 59) Rawalswara, Khanigaun, Nuwakot, Nepal
- Party: CPN (UML)
- Occupation: Work as Gender and Workers' Right Expert

Binda Pandey (Nepali: विन्दा पाण्डे) (Born December 30, 1966) is a Nepalese politician who was a member of the 1st Nepalese Constituent Assembly representing the Communist Party of Nepal (Unified Marxist-Leninist). She was Deputy General Secretary of General Federation of Nepalese Trade Unions (GEFONT) in 2004–08.

== Early life and education ==
Pandey was born in Rawalswara, Khanigaun in Nuwakot District, the second youngest of twelve. Her parents had sent her brothers to the traditional Hindu religious school, Gurukul. She has two master's degrees in Gender and Development Studies and in Botany, as well as two bachelor's degrees in Education and in Law. She has completed her PhD from School of Education of Kathmandu University in 2017.

=== Student politics ===
On March 27, 1981, on the day of a general strike, a rally was organized by students at her school against then autocratic Panchayat rule. One of the demands of students was to release student activists who had been arrested in Kathmandu some days before, one of whom was her youngest elder brother. She took part in a rally walking in the front row, chanting anti-Panchayat slogans.

After the elections of Free Student Unions were held in 1981, in which Pandey's panel won, a district level convention of the All Nepal National Free Students' Union (ANNFSU) was held and she was elected as a treasurer. Later, she and her comrades had a dispute with a school principal and she went to Kathmandu to continue her studies. In Kathmandu she joined Kanti Ishwori Secondary School.

== Career ==
Pandey was involved in the Student movement for more than a decade from 1980 to 1992. In 1992, she joined the All Nepal Women Association (ANWA) which was affiliated with the Communist Party of Nepal (Unified Marxist–Leninist) CPN(UML). She was elected as a treasurer of ANWA in November 1992. She was given a responsibility to organize women laborers through its Central Women Workers Department (CWWD) of General Federation of Nepalese Trade Unions (GEFONT). She later became the secretary of the CWWD, for which she worked until 2000.

Working in the trade union movement, Pandey represented GEFONT in the Committee for Asian Women (CAW), a regional organization working for women workers in 13 Asian countries. She spent three years in Hong Kong as a program coordinator of CAW from 1994 to 1997. After returning from Hong Kong in August 1997, Pandey continued her role as secretary of CWWD and then took over additional responsibilities as a secretary of the Foreign Department and as a member of the Education Department of GEFONT. In the third congress of GEFONT in 2000, she was elected as a chief of the Education department. Since 2004, she has served as a deputy general secretary of GEFONT. After working closely with laborers and women activists inside and outside of the country, she decided to obtain some more academic knowledge and joined a master's course on Gender and Development Studies in Asian Institute of Technologies in Bangkok in 2002.

During her tenure as a member of the National Women Commission (NWC) from 2002 to 2004, she concentrated on drafting NWC's bill, gender analysis of the constitution and preparing recommendation on gender perspectives. She was elected as a member of the Constitution Assembly through the proportional representation of the CPN (UML). She, along with other feminist members in the assembly, protested when the Nepali word Rashtrapati was used for President, for its male-centric connotation. The group had proposed to replace the title with another word Rashtra Adakshya but it is yet to be implemented. She has said that the job of making all the members convince on women's issues is tougher than taking women's issues to the streets. but says she will "continue to fight to make the coming constitution really sensitive to gender issue". She has been elected as member of house of representative of federal parliament of Nepal in 2017 through the proportional representation of the CPN (UML) once again.

In 2011, Pandey was elected as the Deputy Member of ILO Governing Body for three years and reelected for next tenure in 2014 and 2017. As a politician, she was elected as central committee member of CPN-UML as open contestant in 2009 by eighth national general convention and politburo member in 2014 after ninth national general convention.

Her book Women in Nepali Politics was released in 2019. She has also published Samanataka pailaa (समानताकेा पाइला), Dhartimathiko Daabi-Adhikarko ladai (धर्तीमाथिकेा दावी-अधिकारकेा लडाई), and Sangsadiya Rajnitimaa laingik sahavagita (संसदीय राजनीतिमा लैंगिक सहभागिता).
