= Rajendra Kumar Rai (Nepalese politician, born 1964) =

Nepalese politician

- राजेन्द्र कुमार राई

Minister of Water Supply of Nepal
- In office 6 March 2024 – 3 July 2024
- President: Ram Chandra Poudel
- Prime Minister: Pushpa Kamal Dahal
- Preceded by: Mahindra Ray Yadav
- Succeeded by: Pradeep Yadav

Minister of Land Management, Cooperatives and Poverty Alleviation of Nepal
- In office 26 December 2022 – 27 February 2023
- President: Bidya Devi Bhandari
- Prime Minister: Pushpa Kamal Dahal
- Preceded by: Shashi Shrestha
- Succeeded by: Ranjeeta Shrestha

Member of Parliament, Pratinidhi Sabha
- Incumbent
- Assumed office 4 March 2018
- Preceded by: Tika Ram Chemjong
- Constituency: Dhankuta 1

Personal details
- Born: 13 September 1964 (age 61) Pakhribas, Dhankuta District
- Party: CPN (UML)

Rajendra Kumar Rai (Nepali: राजेन्द्र कुमार राई) is a Nepalese politician who formerly served as a Cabinet Minister in the Government of Nepal. He was a two-time member of the House of Representatives representing Dhankuta 1 and belongs to the CPN (Unified Marxist–Leninist). He also served as the deputy chair of Pakhribas VDC from 1994 to 1999.
