= Man Kumari GC =

Nepali politician

Man Kumari G.C.
- मन कुमारी जि.सी.

Member of Parliament, Pratinidhi Sabha for CPN (UML) party list
- In office 4 March 2018 – 18 September 2022

Personal details
- Born: 11 March 1972 (age 54) Baglung District
- Party: CPN UML

Man Kumari GC (also G.C., and GC KC) is a Nepali communist politician and a member of the House of Representatives of the federal parliament of Nepal. She is also a member of the House Education and Health Committee.

She was elected to parliament under the proportional representation system from CPN UML.

Following the formation of Nepal Communist Party (NCP), she represents the new party in parliament, and was also appointed Baglung District "Co-Incharge" for the party.
