= Dulari Qureshi =

Indian art historian

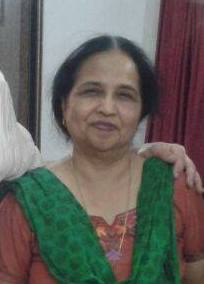
- Born: 24 September 1950 (age 76)
- Occupations: Art historian, academic, author

Dulari Qureshi (born 24 September 1950) is an Indian academic, art historian and author. She has written more than 1,000 articles on art, culture and tourism development and its impacts on monuments. She is a retired professor and Director in the Department of Tourism Administration, Dr. Babasaheb Ambedkar Marathwada University, Aurangabad. She is also the Cultural chairperson of the Ellora-Ajanta Aurangabad Festival. One of her significant contributions is the discovery of inscriptions at Pitalkhora near Aurangabad. Qureshi is the President of Indian Tourist Congress (Western Zone). She is from Aurangabad, Maharashtra.

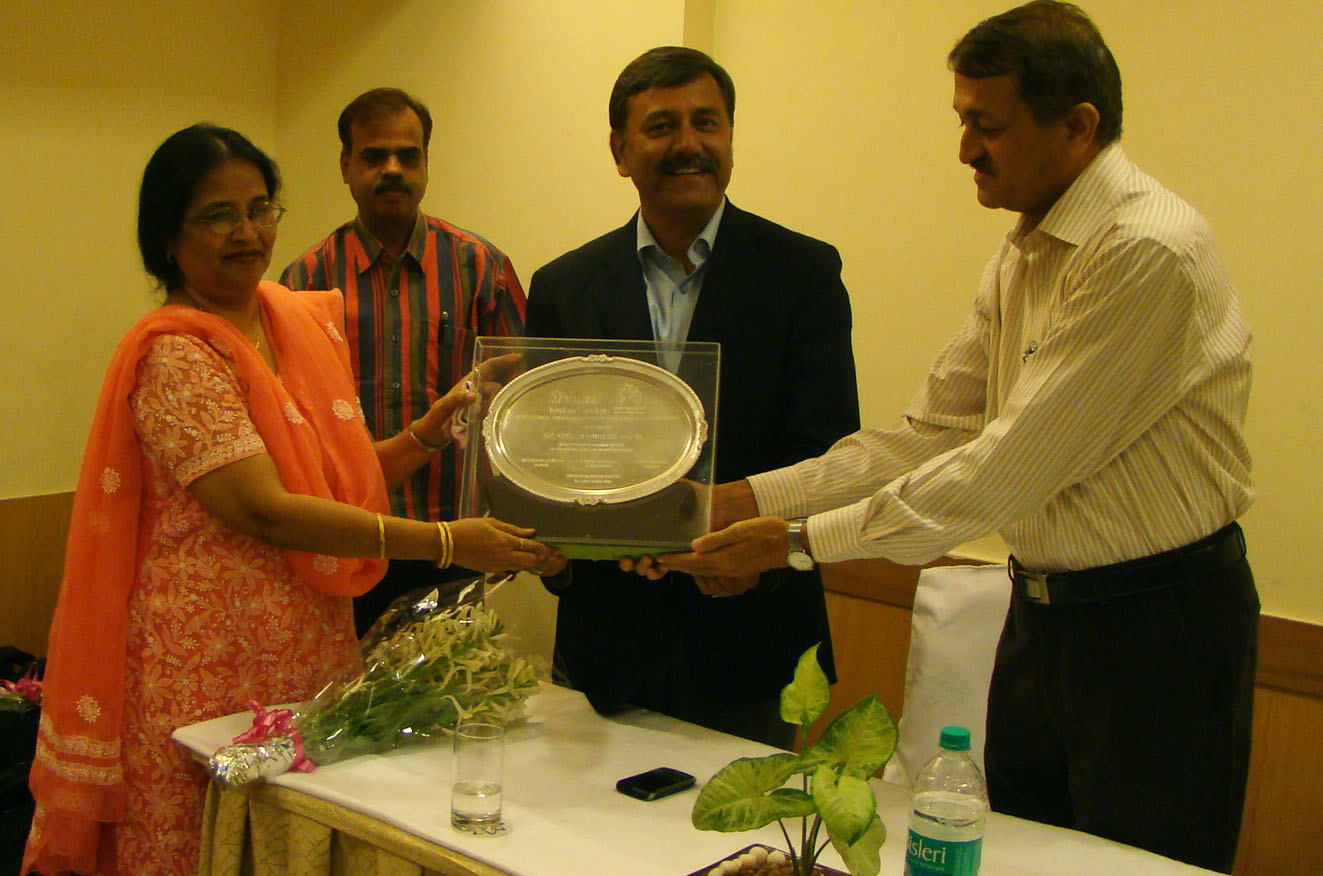
Dr Dulari Qureshi receiving Life Time Achievement Award for promotion of Tourism in Maharashtra, by Maharashtra State, Chamber of Commerce, Industries and Agriculture

== Biography ==
Dulari Qureshi is the daughter of Professor Ramesh Shankar Gupte, an art historian, author and the former head of Department of History and a senior professor in Dr. Babasaheb Ambedkar Marathwada University in Aurangabad. Her mother Nalini Gupte was a physician.

She holds a Doctorate in Art History; the topic of her thesis being, 'Art and Vision of Aurangabad Caves'. She also has a degree in Journalism and a post graduate diploma in Tourism.

== Work ==
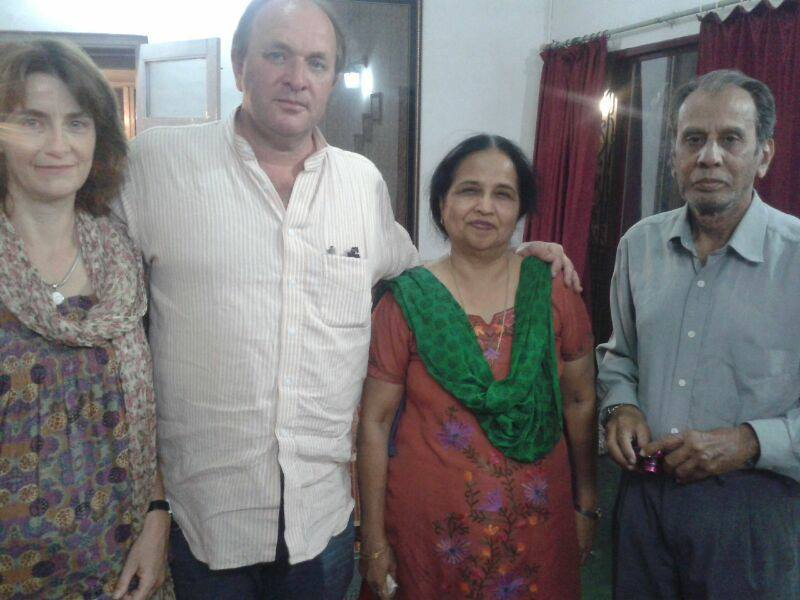
Historian William Dalrymple seen with Dr Dulari Qureshi at her residence in Aurangabad, Maharashtra

Dulari Qureshi has made contributions in the fields of art, history and journalism. She has written more than 20 research articles which were published on national level in books and journals. Apart from her research work, she also contributes articles, feature stories, conducts interviews of famous personalities and has more than 500 articles and other stories to her credit. She started a series of articles and feature stories on the gates of Auranagabad, their present condition which received attention on national level. More so, to promote the local culture and tourism, Dr Dulari along with Dr Morwanchikar took efforts to start the Ellora-Aurangabad festival, of which she is the cultural chairperson, which is held annually.

=== History ===
Apart from being a historian, Qureshi is also a History activist. She played a major role in coercing the ASI to plan and to carry out some rock-buttressing and waterproofing works in the Ajanta Caves along with the chemical conservation of a few of its frescoes. Qureshi along with Morwonchikar, and Walter Spink also pointed out the blunders made at Ajanta by conservators in the past. They opined that only those frescoes in immediate danger of crumbling should be attended to by the ASI or any other national or International body working for the conservation of Ajanta caves.

== Associations ==
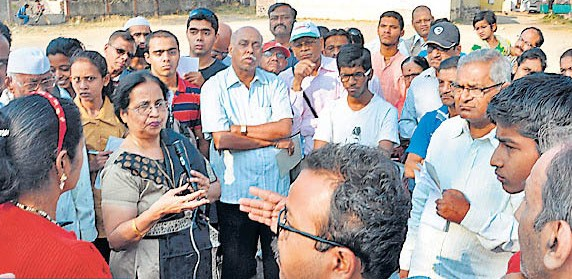
Dr Dulari Qureshi addressing a heritage walk rally organised by Divya Marathi, a pullout of Dainik Bhaskar, a leading newspaper of India

She is closely associated with a number of organisations which are as follows:

- The Tourism Advisory Board; Maharashtra
- Executive Member; Indian National Trust for Art and Cultural Heritage
- Expert Committee on Antiquities ASI
- Cultural Chairperson; Ellora Ajanta Aurangabad Festival Committee
- She was also Joint Secretary of the World Management Conference held in Aurangabad in October 1999
- Member of the Heritage Committee formed by the Aurangabad Municipal Corporation

== Books written ==
- Art and Vision of Aurangabad Caves
- Tourism Potential in Aurangabad
- Fort of Daulatabad
- Rock Cut Temples of Western India
- Sculptures of Marathwada
- Ajanta, Sculpture, Architecture and Painting
- Encyclopedia of Hindu Temples (co-writer)
- Encyclopedia of Buddhist Temples (co-writer)
- Encyclopedia of Jain Temples (co-writer)
- Encyclopedia of Muslim Monuments (co-writer)

== Books edited ==
- Encyclopedia on Hinduism, Buddhism, Jainism and Islam (IV Volumes)

== Sources ==
- Vedic Books
- Ellora-Aurangabad Festival Committee
- Bagchee.com
- Tribune India
