= Surya Bahadur KC =

Nepali industrialist and politician (1957–2020)

- सुर्य बहादुर केसी

Member of Parliament, Pratinidhi Sabha for Nepali Congress party list
- In office 4 March 2018 – 2 November 2020

Personal details
- Born: 27 May 1957 Kaski District
- Died: 2 November 2020 (aged 63)
- Party: Nepali Congress
- Education: B.A. (Tribhuvan University)

Surya Bahadur KC was a Nepali industrialist and a House of Representatives member. He was known for founding Rara Noodle in Nepal. He had been affiliated with Nepali Congress for three years before he died. He also held the post of central treasurer at Rastriya Prajatantra Party. Surya Bahadur KC had also won elections for the chief of Pokhara city during the Panchayat Era.
