= Pushpa Kumari Karna Kayasta =

Nepali politician

- पुष्पा कुमारी कर्ण कायस्त

Member of Parliament, Pratinidhi Sabha for CPN (UML) party list
- Incumbent
- Assumed office 4 March 2018

Personal details
- Born: 19 May 1960 (age 66) Parsa District
- Party: CPN (Unified Socialist)
- Other political affiliations: CPN (UML)
- Education: Tribhuvan University (PhD)

Pushpa Kumari Karna Kayasta (Nepali: पुष्पा कुमारी कर्ण कायस्त) is a Nepali communist politician and a member of the House of Representatives of the federal parliament of Nepal. She represents Communist Party of Nepal (Unified Socialist) in the parliament, where she is also a member of the Parliamentary Public Accounts Committee.

She was elected to parliament under the proportional representation system from CPN UML filling the reserved seat for women and Madhesi groups.
