= Indu Kumari Sharma =

Nepali politician

Member of Parliament, Pratinidhi Sabha for CPN (Maoist Centre) party list
- Incumbent
- Assumed office 4 March 2018

Personal details
- Born: 31 December 1978 (age 47) Surkhet District
- Party: CPN (Maoist Centre)
- Spouse: Ram Kumar Sharma
- Children: 3
- Parents: Brajendra Nath Dutt (father); Nanda Devi (mother)

Indu Kumari Sharma is a Nepali communist politician and a member of the House of Representatives of the federal parliament of Nepal. She was elected from CPN Maoist Centre under the proportional representation system. She represents Nepal Communist Party (NCP) which was formed after the election by the merger of her party with CPN UML.

She was a candidate under the first-past-the-post system from Mahottari-4 constituency, also representing NCP Maoist Centre, in the second constituent assembly elections in 2013.
