= Rajendra Kumar KC =

Nepali politician

Honourable Rajendra Kumar K.C. MP
- राजेन्द्र कुमार के.सी.

Minister of Youth and Sports
- In office 26 July 2017 – 15 February 2018
- President: Bidhya Devi Bhandari
- Prime Minister: Sher Bahadur Deuba
- Preceded by: Daljit Shreepaili
- Succeeded by: Jagat Bahadur Sunar Bishwakarma

Member of Parliament, Pratinidhi Sabha
- In office 4 March 2018 – 12 september 2025
- Preceded by: Pushpa Kamal Dahal
- Succeeded by: Pradip Bista
- Constituency: Kathmandu 10

Member of Constituent Assembly
- In office 21 January 2014 – 14 October 2017
- Preceded by: Pushpa Kamal Dahal
- Succeeded by: Himself
- Constituency: Kathmandu 10

Personal details
- Born: 21 July 1958 (age 67) Kirtipur, Kathmandu District
- Party: Nepali Congress

Rajendra Kumar KC (Nepali: राजेन्द्र कुमार केसी) is a member of the 2nd Nepalese Constituent Assembly and House of Representatives. He won Kathamandu–10 seat in 2013 Nepalese Constituent Assembly election from Nepali Congress defeating Pushpa Kamal Dahal.

In the 2022 Nepalese general election, he was elected as the member of the 2nd Federal Parliament of Nepal.
