= Divya Mani Rajbhandari =

Nepali politician

Dibyamani Rajbhandari
- दिव्यमणि राजभण्डारी

Member of Parliament, Pratinidhi Sabha for Nepali Congress party list
- Incumbent
- Assumed office 4 March 2018

Personal details
- Born: 26 March 1955 (age 70) Kathmandu District
- Citizenship: Nepali
- Political party: Nepali Congress

Dibya Mani Rajbhandari (or Dibyamani Rajbhandari) is a Nepali politician and a member of the House of Representatives of the federal parliament of Nepal. He was elected under the proportional representation system from Nepali Congress filling the reserved seat for the Indigenous group.
