= Janaki Devi Ram =

Nepali politician

- जानकी देवी राम

Member of Parliament, Pratinidhi Sabha for CPN (UML) Party List
- In office 4 April 2021 – 18 September 2022

Personal details
- Born: 27 March 1955 (age 71)
- Party: CPN (UML)
- Spouse: Badri Narayan Ram

Janaki Devi Ram (Nepali: जानकी देवी राम) is a Nepalese politician currently serving as a Member of Parliament for the House of Representatives. She is a member of the CPN (Unified Marxist–Leninist) and was elected to the parliament from the party list under the Dalit quota as a replacement for former MP Sanu Siva Pahadi who had died on 14 October 2020.
