= Dhankuta 1 =

Parliamentary constituency in Nepal

- Parliamentary constituency
- Dhankuta 1 in Koshi Province
- Province: Koshi Province
- District: Dhankuta District

Current constituency
- Created: 1991
- Member of Parliament: Rajendra Kumar Rai, UML
- Koshi MPA 1(A): Niran Rai, UML
- Koshi MPA 1(B): Indra Mani Parajuli, UML

Dhankuta 1 is the parliamentary constituency of Dhankuta District in Nepal. This constituency came into existence on the Constituency Delimitation Commission (CDC) report submitted on 31 August 2017.

== Incorporated areas ==
Dhankuta 1 incorporates the entirety of Dhankuta District.

== Assembly segments ==
It encompasses the following Province No. 1 Provincial Assembly segment

- Dhankuta 1(A)
- Dhankuta 1(B)

== Members of Parliament ==
=== Parliament/Constituent Assembly ===
Election	Member	Party
1991	Rakam Chemjong	CPN (UML)
March 1998	Rakam Chemjong	CPN (Marxist–Leninist)
1999	Durga Linkha	CPN (UML)
2008	Hem Raj Bhandari	CPN (Maoist)
January 2009	Hem Raj Bhandari	Maoist Centre
2013	Tika Ram Chemjong Limbu	CPN (UML)
2017	Rajendra Kumar Rai	CPN (UML)
May 2018	Rajendra Kumar Rai	NCP
March 2021	Rajendra Kumar Rai	CPN (UML)

=== Provincial Assembly ===
==== 1(A) ====
Election	Member	Party
2017	Niran Rai	CPN (UML)
May 2018	Niran Rai	NCP
March 2021	Niran Rai	CPN (UML)

==== 1(B) ====
Election	Member	Party
2017	Indra Mani Parajuli	CPN (UML)
May 2018	Indra Mani Parajuli	NCP
March 2021	Indra Mani Parajuli	CPN (UML)

== Election results ==
=== Election in the 2020s ===
==== 2026 general election ====
Candidate	Party	Votes	%
Rajendra Kumar Rai	CPN (UML)	18,132	30.62
Dinesh Rai	Nepali Congress	14,257	24.08
San Bahadur Tamang	SSP	11,932	20.15
Dinesh Bhandari	RSP	9,944	16.80
Dharma Prasad Paudel	NCP	1,665	2.81
Lakpa Tamang	Ind	1,181	1.99
Bibhatsu Thapa	RPP	703	1.19
Others		1,394	2.35
Total		59,208	100.00
Majority			
CPN (UML) hold			

==== 2022 general election ====
Candidate	Party	Votes	%
Rajendra Kumar Rai	CPN (UML)	30,101	45.11
Sunil Bahadur Thapa	Nepali Congress	28,704	43.02
Hemraj Bhandari	Independent	5,926	8.88
Kumar Bahadur Thapa	RPP	1,059	1.59
Others		937	1.40
Total		66,727	100.00
Majority		1,397	
CPN (UML) hold			

==== 2022 provincial election ====
===== 1(A) =====
Candidate	Party	Votes	%
Niran Rai	CPN (UML)	17,018	47.21
Arjun Kumar Rai	Unified Socialist	10,226	28.37
Rakam Chemjong	PSP-N	8,247	22.88
Others	554	1.54	
Total		36,045	100.00
Majority		6,792	
CPN (UML)			

===== 1(B) =====
Candidate	Party	Votes	%
Indra Mani Parajuli	CPN (UML)	15,797	51.44
Kusum Kumari Shrestha	Maoist Centre	11,230	36.57
Shyam Bahadur Gurung	RPP	1,715	5.58
Dambar Bahadur Katuwal	PSP-N	774	2.52
Others	1,195	3.89	
Total		30,711	100.00
Majority		4,567	
CPN (UML)			

=== Election in the 2010s ===
==== 2017 general elections ====
Candidate	Party	Votes	%
Rajendra Kumar Rai	CPN (UML)	37,333	56.09
Sunil Bahadur Thapa	RPP (Democratic)	26,874	40.37
Subhan Singh Rai	URPP (Nationalist)	1,390	2.09
Others		967	1.45
Total		66,564	100.00
Valid votes		66,564	94.71
Invalid/blank votes		3,716	5.29
Total votes		70,280	100.00
CPN (UML) hold			
Source: Election Commission

==== 2017 Nepalese provincial elections ====
===== 1(A) =====
Candidate	Party	Votes	%
Niran Rai	CPN (UML)	20,088	56.58
Manohar Narayan Shrestha	Nepali Congress	13,442	37.86
Gyan Bahadur Bista	URPP (Nationalist)	1,117	3.15
Others		855	2.41
Total		35,502	100.00
Valid votes		35,502	95.25
Invalid/blank votes		1,770	4.75
Total votes		37,272	100.00
CPN (UML) gain			
Source: Election Commission

===== 1(B) =====
Candidate	Party	Votes	%
Indra Mani Parajuli	CPN (UML)	20,652	65.66
Arjun Thapa	FSF-N	8,231	26.17
Dajanbo Sherpa	URPP (Nationalist)	1,921	6.11
Others		648	2.06
Total		31,452	100.00
Valid votes		31,452	95.58
Invalid/blank votes		1,453	4.42
Total votes		32,905	100.00
CPN (UML) gain			
Source: Election Commission

==== 2013 Constituent Assembly election ====
Candidate	Party	Votes	%
Tika Ram Chemjong Limbu	CPN (UML)	10,953	35.23
Ajit Narayan Singh Thapa	Nepali Congress	7,448	23.96
Hem Raj Bhandari	UCPN (Maoist)	4,797	15.43
Rakam Chemjong	FSP-N	4,594	14.78
Dharma Dhoj Rai	RPP	2,048	6.59
Others		1,250	4.02
Total		31,090	100.00
CPN (UML) gain			
Source: Election Commission

=== Election in the 2000s ===
==== 2008 Constituent Assembly election ====
Candidate	Party	Votes	%
Hem Raj Bhandari	CPN (Maoist)	17,202	47.06
Rakam Chemjong	CPN (UML)	11,174	30.57
Manohar Narayan Shrestha	Nepali Congress	6,129	16.77
Others		2,049	5.61
Total		36,554	100.00
Valid votes		36,554	96.35
Invalid/blank votes		1,386	3.65
Total votes		37,940	100.00
CPN (Maoist) gain			
Source: Election Commission

=== Election in the 1990s ===
==== 1999 legislative elections ====
Candidate	Party	Votes	%
Durga Linkha	CPN (UML)	15,512	43.67
Hari Kumar Rai	Nepali Congress	11,207	31.55
Rakam Chemjong	CPN (Marxist–Leninist)	4,685	13.19
Santosh Kumar Phago	Rastriya Prajatantra Party	2,880	8.11
Others		1,233	3.47
Total		35,517	100.00
Valid votes		35,517	97.99
Invalid/blank votes		727	2.01
Total votes		36,244	100.00
CPN (UML) gain			
Source: Election Commission

==== 1994 legislative elections ====
Candidate	Party	Votes	%
Rakam Chemjong	CPN (UML)	12,574	40.35
Mohan Pokharel	RPP	9,737	31.25
Hari Kumar Rai	Nepali Congress	8,209	26.34
Bhim Bahadur Limbu	Janamukti	643	2.06
Total		31,163	100.00
CPN (UML) hold			
Source: Election Commission

==== 1991 legislative elections ====
Candidate	Party	Votes	%
Rakam Chemjong	CPN (UML)	17,610	69.06
Janak Singh Limbu	Nepali Congress	7,890	30.94
Total		25,500	100.00
CPN (UML) gain			

== See also ==
- List of parliamentary constituencies of Nepal
