= Amrita Thapa =

Nepali politician

- अम्रिता थापा

Member of Parliament, Pratinidhi Sabha for CPN (Maoist Centre) party list
- Incumbent
- Assumed office 4 March 2018

Member of Constituent Assembly for UCPN (Maoist) Party List
- In office 28 May 2008 – 28 May 2012

Personal details
- Born: 18 May 1972 (age 54) Syangja District
- Party: CPN (Maoist Centre)
- Spouse: Hit Man Shakya
- Children: 2
- Parents: Lok Bahadur Thapa (father); Shobha Kumari Thapa (mother)

Amrita Thapa (Nepali: अम्रिता थापा) is a Nepali communist politician, a former Maoist insurgent, coordinator of the Women Wing of the ruling Nepal Communist Party (NCP), and member of the Nepal House of Representatives of the federal parliament of Nepal, elected under the proportional representation system.
