= Kalyani Kumari Khadka =

Nepali politician

- कल्याणी कुमारी खड्का

Member of Parliament, Pratinidhi Sabha for CPN (UML) party list
- In office 4 March 2018 – September 2022
- President: Bidya Devi Bhandari
- Prime Minister: Sher Bahadur Deuba

Personal details
- Born: 25 November 1964 (age 61)
- Party: CPN (Unified Socialist)
- Other party: CPN (UML)
- Spouse: Ram Kumar Bhattarai
- Children: 1
- Parents: Ram Bahadur Khadka (father); Bhakta Kumari Khadka (mother)

Kalyani Kumari Khadka (Nepali: कल्यानी कुमारी खड्का) is a Nepali communist politician and a member of the House of Representatives of the federal parliament of Nepal. She was elected under the proportional representation system from Rautahat District representing CPN UML. She is the chair of the House Development and Technology committee.
