= Laxmi Kumari Chaudhary =

Nepali politician

- लक्ष्मी कुमारी चौधरी

Member of Parliament, Pratinidhi Sabha for CPN (UML) party list
- Incumbent
- Assumed office 4 March 2018

Personal details
- Born: 8 March 1984 (age 42) Kailali District
- Party: CPN (Unified Socialist)
- Other party: CPN (UML)

Laxmi Kumari Chaudhary (also Chaudhari) is a Nepali communist politician and a member of the House of Representatives of the federal parliament of Nepal. She was elected under the proportional representation system from CPN UML. She represents CPN (Unified Socialist) in the parliament, and is also a member of the State Affairs Committee.

She was also a member of the second constituent assembly elected in 2013. She was the chairperson of the Committee to Enhance the Capacity of Lawmakers and Resource Mobilisation in the constituent assembly.
