= Yashoda Gurung (Subedi) =

Nepali politician

- यशोदा गुरुङ (सुवेदी)

Member of Parliament, Pratinidhi Sabha for CPN (Maoist Centre) party list
- Incumbent
- Assumed office 4 March 2018

Member of Constituent Assembly for CPN (Maoist) party list
- In office 28 May 2008 – 28 May 2012

Personal details
- Born: 18 August 1968 (age 57)
- Party: CPN (Maoist Centre)
- Other party: CPN (Unity Centre)
- Spouse: Dev Prasad Gurung
- Children: 2

Yashoda Gurung is a Nepalese politician currently serving as a member of the House of Representatives. She was elected to the House of Representatives from the CPN (Maoist Centre) party list under the indigenous people quota. She was also a member of the 1st Nepalese Constituent Assembly and was elected from the party list.

== Personal life ==
She is married to CPN (Maoist Centre) politician Dev Prasad Gurung with whom she has two children.
