= Namita Kumari Chaudhary =

Nepali politician

- नमिता कुमारी चौधरी

Member of Parliament, Pratinidhi Sabha for Nepali Congress party list
- Incumbent
- Assumed office 4 March 2018

Personal details
- Born: 17 August 1978 (age 47) Saptari District
- Party: Nepali Congress

Namita Kumari Chaudhary is a Nepali politician and a member of the House of Representatives of the federal parliament of Nepal. She was elected under the proportional representation system from Nepali Congress. She is a member of the House Education and Health Committee. She is also a member of the parliamentary party executive committee of Nepali Congress. She is a member of the Ministry of Education, Science and Technology in the shadow cabinet of Nepali Congress.
