= Anjana Bisankhe =

Nepali politician

- अञ्जना विशंखे

Member of Parliament, Pratinidhi Sabha
- In office 2018–2022
- Constituency: Party List

Personal details
- Born: 12 July 1974 (age 51) Chandragiri, Kathmandu District
- Party: Progressive Campaign, Nepal
- Other party: CPN (Maoist Centre) (till 2025)
- Children: 1
- Parents: Chandra Bahadur Bisankhe (father); Aasha Purkoti (mother)

Anjana Bisankhe (Nepali: अंजना बीसङ्खे) is a Nepalese politician belonging to Pragatisheel Loktantrik Party. She served as serving as a Member of the House of Representatives (Nepal) elected from party list . She was also a member of the Presidium of CPN (Maoist Centre) when she left the party.

== See also ==
- Progressive Campaign, Nepal
