= Dulari Devi Khatweni =

Nepali politician

- दुलारी देवी खतवेनी

Member of Parliament, Pratinidhi Sabha for Rastriya Janata Party list
- Incumbent
- Assumed office 4 March 2018

Personal details
- Born: 9 May 1971 (age 55) Saptari District
- Party: Loktantrik Samajwadi
- Other political affiliations: TMLP; RJPN; PSP-N

Dulari Devi Khatweni (Nepali: दुलारी देवी खतवेनी) (also Dulari Devi Khanga, Dularidevi Khatweni or Dularidevi Khanga) is a Nepali politician and a member of the House of Representatives of the federal parliament of Nepal. She was elected under the proportional representation system from Rastriya Janata Party Nepal. She is also a member of the House Education and Health Committee.
