= Gyan Kumari Chhantyal =

Nepalese politician (died 2020)

- ज्ञानकुमारी छन्त्याल
- In office 2013 – 1 July 2020
- Constituency: Baglung-3

Personal details
- Born: Nepal
- Died: Nepal
- Party: Nepali Congress

Gyan Kumari Chhantyal (Nepali: ज्ञानकुमारी छन्त्याल) (1953/1954 – 1 July 2020) was a member of 2nd Nepalese Constituent Assembly. She won Baglung–3 seat in CA assembly, 2013 from Nepali Congress. Gyan was born in Tamankhola rural Municipality-5 of Baglung,

== Death ==
Gyan Kumari was admitted to Sahid Gangalal National Heart Centre in Kathmandu where she died on 1 July 2020 morning. She was 66. Gyan underwent heart surgery on June 28 after three out of the four valves blocked in her heart. Gyan's funeral rites will be performed at Pashupati Aryaghat on 1 July 2020.
