= 2017 Nepalese general election =

- 26 November 2017 (first phase); 7 December 2017 (second phase)

All 275 seats in the House of Representatives 138 seats needed for a majority
- Registered: 15,427,731
- Turnout: 68.63% (▼9.71 pp)
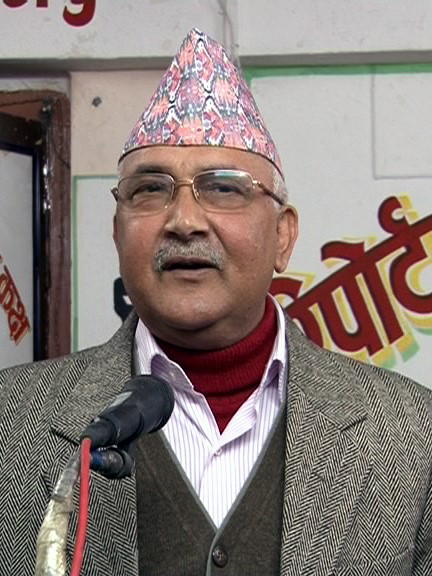

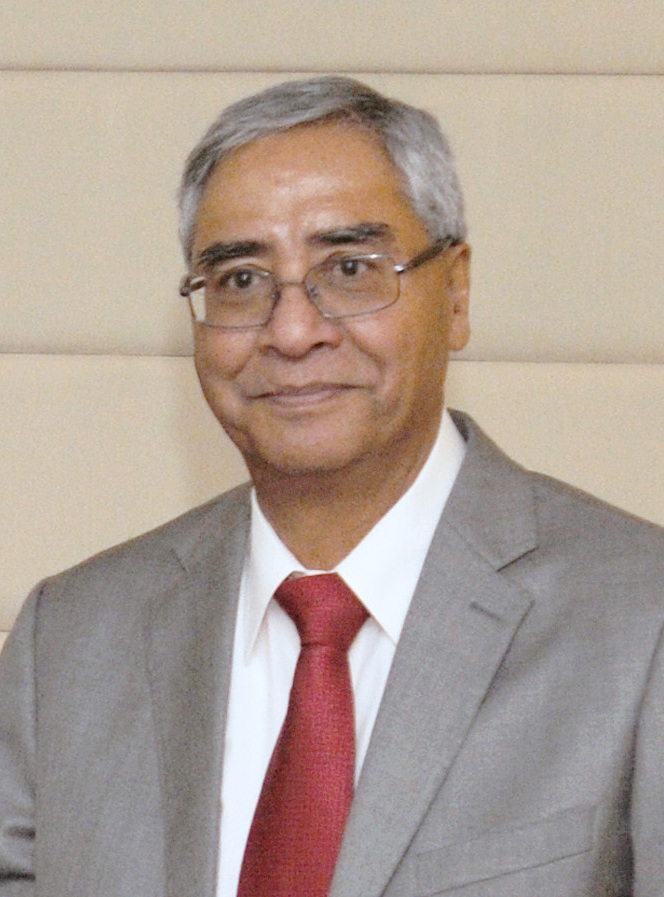

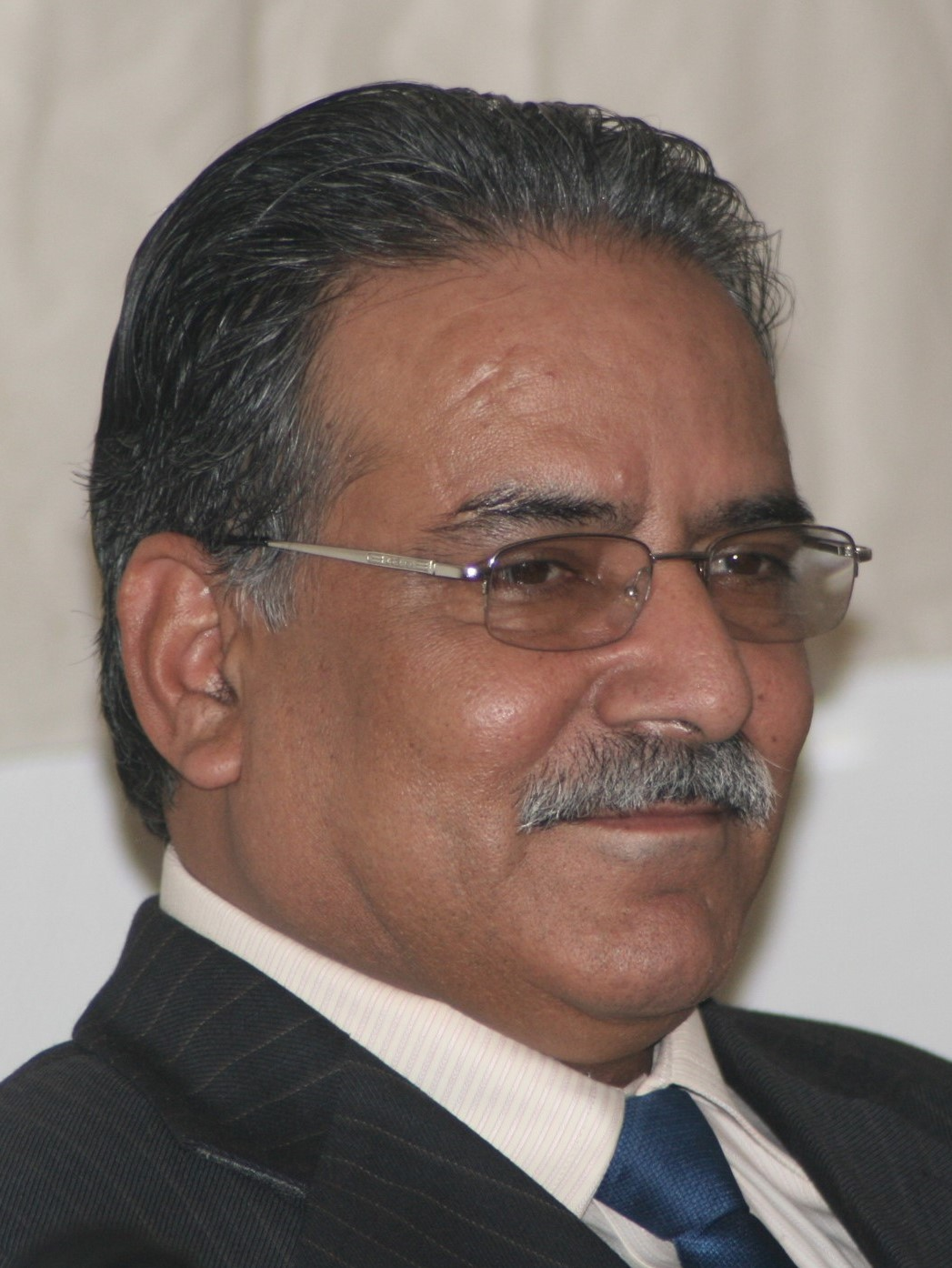

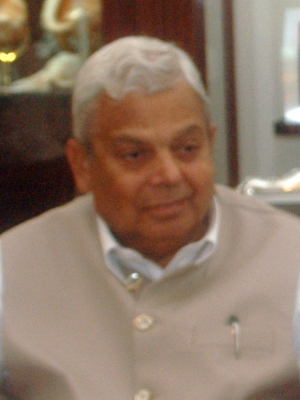

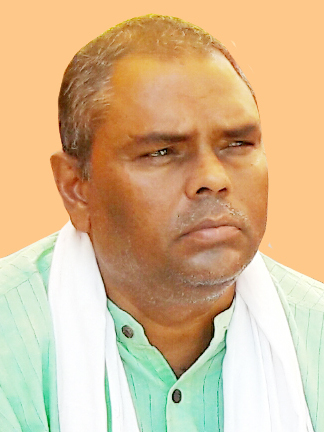
	First party	Second party	Third party
Leader	K. P. Sharma Oli	Sher Bahadur Deuba	Pushpa Kamal Dahal
Party	CPN (UML)	Congress	Maoist Centre
Last election	175	196	80
Seats won	121	63	53
Seat change	▼54	▼133	▼27
Popular vote	3,173,494	3,128,389	1,303,721
Percentage	33.25%	32.78%	13.66%
Swing	▲9.59pp	▲7.23pp	▼1.55pp
	Fourth party	Fifth party
Leader	Mahantha Thakur	Upendra Yadav
Party	RJPN	Forum Nepal
Last election	New entry	New entry
Seats won	17	16
Seat change	New entry	New entry
Popular vote	472,254	470,201
Percentage	4.95%	4.93%
Swing	New entry	New entry
- Results by constituency
Prime Minister before election
Sher Bahadur Deuba
Congress
Prime Minister after election
K. P. Sharma Oli
CPN (UML)

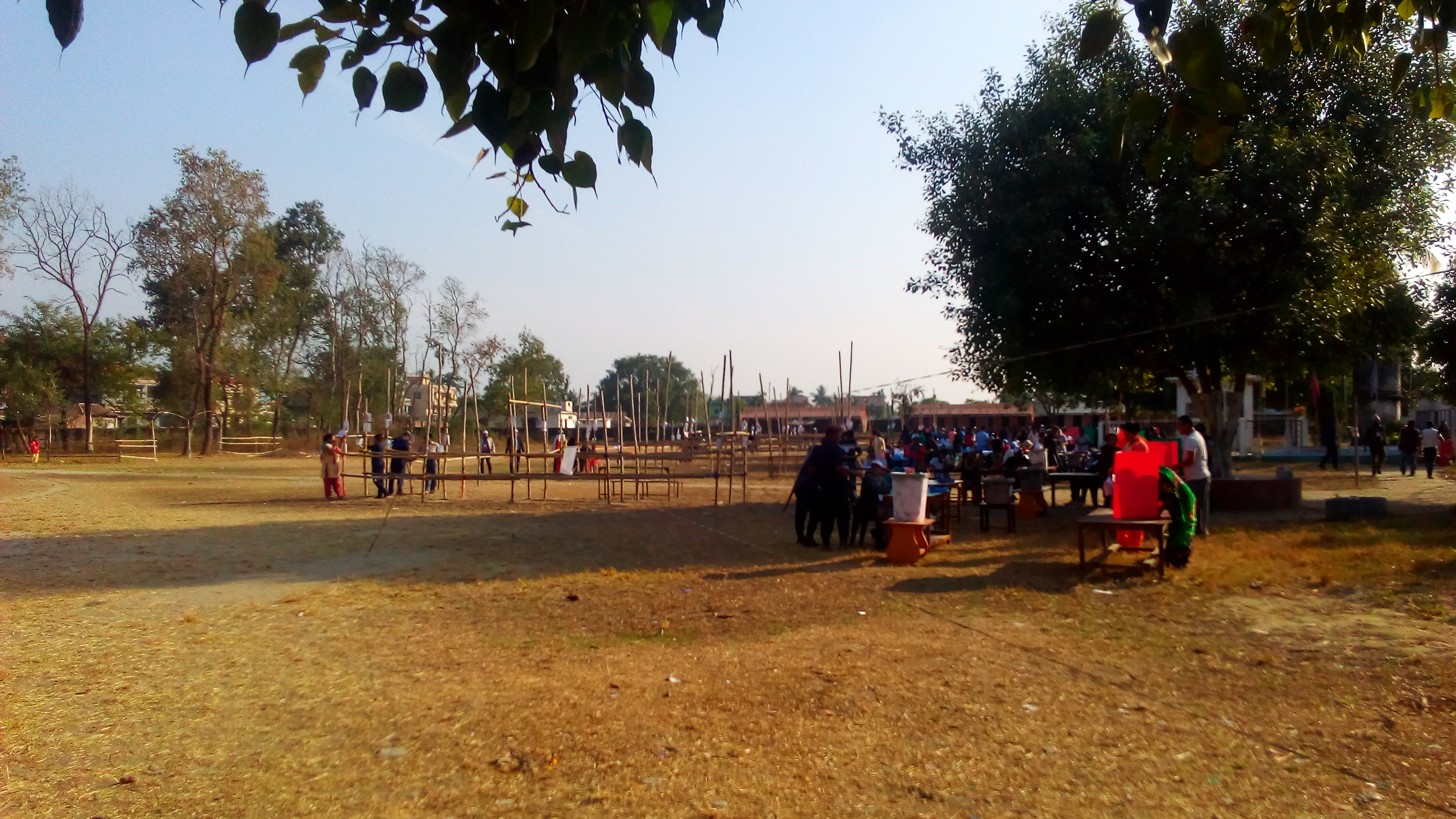
Election, December 7 in Kankai Municipality

General elections were held in Nepal in two phases on 26 November and 7 December 2017 to elect the 275 members of the fifth House of Representatives, the lower house of the Federal Parliament of Nepal.

The election was held alongside the first provincial elections for the seven provincial assemblies.

A political deadlock between the governing Nepali Congress and the winning left-wing coalition over the system used to elect the upper house led to delay in forming the new government.

Following the announcement of the final result by the Election Commission, K. P. Sharma Oli of Communist Party of Nepal (Unified Marxist–Leninist) was sworn in as Prime Minister on 15 February 2018 by the President according to Article 76 (2) of the constitution. He passed a Motion of Confidence on 11 March 2018 with 208 votes.

== Background ==
The previous House of Representatives, elected in May 1999, was dissolved by King Gyanendra on advice of Prime Minister Sher Bahadur Deuba in May 2002 in order to hold new elections. Elections could not take place due to the ongoing civil war which eventually led King Gyanendra to stage a royal coup in February 2005 after dismissing four Prime Ministers. Following the democracy movement of 2006, the King reinstated the earlier legislature. On 15 January 2007, the House of Representatives was replaced by an Interim Legislature. The Interim Legislature consisted both of members appointed by an agreement between the Seven Party Alliance and the Communist Party of Nepal (Maoist).

The Interim Legislature was followed by the first Constituent Assembly whose task was to form a new constitution. The failure of the assembly to write a constitution within the stipulated time led to the formation of the second Constituent Assembly which approved the Constitution of Nepal on 20 September 2015. After the promulgation of constitution, the second Constituent Assembly was converted into a unitary Legislature Parliament. The constitution set the tenure of the Legislature Parliament until 21 January 2018 or the date of filing of nomination for the Pratinidhi Sabha, whichever is earlier. Per this provision, the tenure of the Legislature Parliament ended on 14 October 2017.

A five-member Constituency Delineation Commission was formed under the chairmanship of former Supreme Court Justice Kamal Narayan Das to redraw the constituency boundaries to 165, a reduction from the 240 used in the 2013 elections. It submitted its report to the government on 30 August 2017. The boundaries set by this commission will remain unchanged for the next 20 years as per Article 286 (12).

== Electoral system ==
The 275 members of the legislature were elected by two methods; 165 were elected from single-member constituencies by first-past-the-post voting and 110 seats were elected by closed list proportional representation from a single nationwide constituency. Each voter received separate ballot papers for the two methods. A party or electoral alliance had to pass the election threshold of 3% of the overall valid vote to be allocated a seat under the proportional method.

Nepal uses the Sainte-Laguë method to allocate proportional seats. Typically, the divisors under this system include all odd numbers (1, 3, 5, 7...). But in Nepal, the first divisor is 1.4, rather than 1. This is intended to make it difficult for smaller parties to get a single seat "too cheaply" as the system benefits smaller parties at the expense of larger ones.

=== Eligibility to vote ===
To vote in the general election, one must be:

- on the electoral roll
- aged 18
- a citizen of Nepal
- of sound mind
- not ineligible as per federal election fraud and punishment laws

=== Timetable ===
The key dates are listed below

19 August	Last day to register to be on electoral roll
21 August	Cabinet announces election date
27 August	Last day for party registration at Election Commission
30 August	Election code of conduct starts
14 October	Tenure of Legislature parliament ends
15 October	Parties submit preliminary closed list for proportional representation
22 October	Candidate nomination for first phase of first past the post
2 November	Candidate nomination for second phase of first past the post
19 November	Closed list for proportional representation finalized and published
26 November	Election day (first phase) – polling centres open 07:00 to 17:00
7 December	Election day (second phase) – polling centres open 07:00 to 17:00
14 February	Final result announced and presented to President

== Parties and alliances ==
A total of 88 parties were granted ballot access under the proportional system. However, only 49 parties submitted list of proportional candidates.

=== Left alliance ===
1. CPN (UML) (57.0%)
2. Communist Party of Nepal (Maoist Centre) (40.0%)
3. Independent political group (2.50%)
4. Rastriya Janamorcha (0.50%)

A left alliance comprising the Communist Party of Nepal (Unified Marxist–Leninist), the Communist Party of Nepal (Maoist Centre) and the Naya Shakti Party was announced with party unification to follow after the elections. However, Naya Shakti Party left the alliance after its coordinator Baburam Bhattarai was not guaranteed an election ticket from his preferred constituency of Gorkha. He subsequently switched alliances in Gorkha. Other leftist parties like Rastriya Janamorcha and Communist Party of Nepal (Marxist–Leninist) had also joined this alliance in some constituencies.

=== Democratic alliance ===
An alliance consisting of the center-left Nepali Congress, the Rastriya Prajatanra Party, the Rastriya Prajatanra Party (Democratic), Naya Shakti Party, Nepal and two Madhesh based parties, Federal Socialist Forum, Nepal and Rastriya Janata Party Nepal, was formed as a response to this left alliance. Rastriya Prajatantra Party allied with the left parties to defeat Nepali Congress candidate former Home Minister Krishna Prasad Sitaula in Jhapa-3. Later two Madhesh based parties, Federal Socialist Forum, Nepal and Rastriya Janata Party Nepal left the alliance due to differences on seat sharing.

=== Madhesh alliance ===
After two Madhesh based parties, Federal Socialist Forum, Nepal and Rastriya Janata Party Nepal left the alliance due to differences on seat sharing, they formed an alliance on their own and fielded in elections.

== Conduct ==
Before the final phase of the election, starting 5 December, the border with India was closed at 22 points. There have been over a hundred minor and major explosions in the run up to the elections targeting election assemblies and leaders. A temporary police was killed in Dang from an explosion at an event attended by the Prime Minister. Nepali Congress candidate Narayan Karki was injured in a targeted explosion to his vehicle in Udayapur while 11 people including former Health Minister Gagan Thapa were injured from an explosion in Kathmandu.

== Results ==
Five parties, CPN (Unified Marxist-Leninst), Nepali Congress, CPN (Maoist Centre), Rastriya Janata Party and Federal Socialist Forum, won at least one seat in first-past-the-post voting and crossed the three percent in proportional voting and were represented in the parliament. Rastriya Prajatantra Party, Naya Shakti Party, Rastriya Janamorcha and Nepal Workers Peasants Party did not reach the three percent threshold in proportional voting and were represented as independents in the parliament.

Party	Proportional			Constituency			Total seats
Party	Votes	%	Seats	Votes	%	Seats	Total seats
Communist Party of Nepal (Unified Marxist–Leninist)	3,173,494	33.25	41	3,082,277	30.68	80	121
Nepali Congress	3,128,389	32.78	40	3,590,793	35.75	23	63
Communist Party of Nepal (Maoist Centre) (Note: Contested jointly with the Samajbadi Janata Party and Janajagaran Party, Nepal in the proportional vote.)	1,303,721	13.66	17	1,510,760	15.04	36	53
Rastriya Janata Party Nepal	472,254	4.95	6	458,409	4.56	11	17
Federal Socialist Forum, Nepal	470,201	4.93	6	527,924	5.26	10	16
Bibeksheel Sajha Party	212,366	2.22	0	96,233	0.96	0	0
Rastriya Prajatantra Party	196,782	2.06	0	118,318	1.18	1	1
Rastriya Prajatantra Party (Democratic)	88,377	0.93	0	123,797	1.23	0	0
Naya Shakti Party, Nepal	81,837	0.86	0	84,037	0.84	1	1
Rastriya Janamorcha	62,133	0.65	0	70,014	0.70	1	1
Nepal Workers Peasants Party	56,141	0.59	0	52,668	0.52	1	1
CPN (Marxist–Leninist)–Jana Samajbadi Party, Nepal (Note: Ran separately in the FPTP vote; CPN (Marxist–Leninist) received 69,115 votes and the Jana Samajbadi Party, Nepal 13,067.)	41,270	0.43	0	82,182	0.82	0	0
Nepal Federal Socialist Party	36,015	0.38	0	19,064	0.19	0	0
Rastriya Janamukti Party	33,091	0.35	0	27,279	0.27	0	0
Ekikrit Rastriya Prajatantrik Party (Nationalist)	28,835	0.30	0	34,765	0.35	0	0
Nepali Janata Dal	22,049	0.23	0	8,750	0.09	0	0
Sanghiya Loktantrik Rastriya Manch	21,610	0.23	0	17,017	0.17	0	0
Bahujan Shakti Party	15,468	0.16	0	10,382	0.10	0	0
Mongol National Organisation	15,117	0.16	0	16,500	0.16	0	0
Sanghiya Loktantrik Rastriya Manch (Tharuhat)	14,489	0.15	0	121	0.00	0	0
Patriotic People's Republican Front, Nepal	13,942	0.15	0	19,884	0.20	0	0
Nepal Janata Party	9,310	0.10	0	3,387	0.03	0	0
Janashakti Nepal	7,981	0.08	0				0
Aamul Pariwartan Masiha Party Nepal	5,161	0.05	0	793	0.01	0	0
Rastriya Mukti Andolan Nepal	4,275	0.04	0	1,550	0.02	0	0
Nepa Rastriya Party	3,460	0.04	0	206	0.00	0	0
Nepal Loktantrik Janata Congress	2,389	0.03	0	815	0.01	0	0
Churebhavar Loktantrik Party	2,170	0.02	0	475	0.00	0	0
Green Party Nepal	1,685	0.02	0	334	0.00	0	0
Nepal Samabeshi Party	1,676	0.02	0				0
Nepali Congress (B.P.)	1,608	0.02	0	2,679	0.03	0	0
Nepalwad	1,547	0.02	0	37	0.00	0	0
Nepal Sukumbasi Party (Democratic)	1,456	0.02	0				0
Communist Party of Nepal (Marxist)	1,420	0.01	0	1,440	0.01	0	0
Tamangsaling Loktantrik Party	1,397	0.01	0	77	0.00	0	0
Nepal Yuwa Kisan Party	1,334	0.01	0	1,033	0.01	0	0
Rastriya Samajwadi Party, Nepal	1,053	0.01	0	366	0.00	0	0
Nepal Darshan	1,052	0.01	0				0
Rastriya Yatharthawadi Party, Nepal	977	0.01	0	502	0.00	0	0
Nepal Naulo Janwadi Party	976	0.01	0	75	0.00	0	0
Rastriya Shiva Sena Party–Rastriya Nagarik Party (Note: Ran separately in the FPTP vote; Rastriya Shiva Sena Party received 157 votes and Rastriya Nagarik Party 25.)	946	0.01	0	182	0.00	0	0
Yuwa Nepal Party	872	0.01	0	137	0.00	0	0
Nepal Dalit Party	834	0.01	0	1,092	0.01	0	0
Sanghiya Khumbuwan Democratic Party Nepal	744	0.01	0	408	0.00	0	0
Deshbhakta Loktantrik Party	740	0.01	0	1,289	0.01	0	0
Janaprajatantrik Party, Nepal	721	0.01	0	138	0.00	0	0
Liberal Democratic Party	519	0.01	0	259	0.00	0	0
Deshbhakta Samaj	434	0.00	0	92	0.00	0	0
Hamro Party	426	0.00	0	89	0.00	0	0
Nepal Loktantrik Janata Congress				815	0.01	0	0
Bahujan Samaj Party Nepal				708	0.01	0	0
Dalit, Muslim Janashakti Party				544	0.01	0	0
Rastriya Yatharthabadi Party Nepal				502	0.00	0	0
Lok Kalyankari Janta Party Nepal				496	0.00	0	0
Rastriya Samajbadi Party Nepal				366	0.00	0	0
Madhesh Terai Forum				152	0.00	0	0
Nepali Greens				78	0.00	0	0
Muskan Sena Nepal				22	0.00	0	0
Independents				73,243	0.73	1	1
Total	9,544,744	100.00	110	10,045,555	100.00	165	275
Valid votes	9,544,744	90.15					
Invalid/blank votes	1,042,777	9.85					
Total votes	10,587,521	100.00					
Registered voters/turnout	15,427,731	68.63					
Source: Election Commission, Kathmandu Post

== Major losses ==
These losses were mainly the result of formation of left alliance between CPN(UML) and CPN(Maoist Centre) which led to set back of Democratic alliance in the hill region. Similarly, FSF-N and RJP-N formed a pro-Madhesh alliance which led to its set back in Province no 2 which had remained fertile and for Congress in last decades ever since 1940s. The communist alliance later formed Nepal Communist Party while the Madhesh alliance changed to People's Socialist Party, Nepal.

Still, these alliances resulted in the loss of the Nepali Congress which obtained highest number of votes in FPTP, gaining nearly 36% votes cast.

In spite of this, the result went against Nepali Congress and they could not win any more than 23 seats, making it the third largest party per FPTP results. As such, many sitting ministers lost their seats.

Bam Dev Gautam and Narayan Kaji Shrestha lost their elections even though the Communist alliance nearly obtained a majority.

=== Outgoing Deputy Prime Minister to lose in the election ===
- Kamal Thapa - Minister of Energy (Makwanpur 1) Rastriya Prajatantra Party
- Gopal Man Shrestha - Minister of Education (Syangja 2) Nepali Congress

=== Outgoing Cabinet Ministers to lose in the election ===
- Sunil Bahadur Thapa - Minister of Industry (Dhankuta 1) Rastriya Prajatantra Party
- Farmulha Mansur - Minister of Labour and Employment (Bara 3) Nepali Congress
- Brikam Bahadur Thapa - Minister for Women, Children and Social Welfare Development (Kathmandu 6) Rastriya Prajatantra Party
- Deepak Bohora - Minister for Health (Rupandehi 3) Rastriya Prajatantra Party
- Bir Bahadur Balayar - Minister for Physical Infrastructure and Transportation (Doti 1) Nepali Congress
- Gopal Dahit - Minister for Land Reform and Management (Bardiya 2) Nepali Congress
- Mohan Bahadur Basnet - Minister for Information and Communications (Sindhupalchok 1) Nepali Congress
- Ram Krishna Yadav - Minister for Agricultural Development (Dhanusha 2) Nepali Congress
- Mahendra Yadav - Minister for Water Supply and Sanitation (Dhanusha 4) Nepali Congress
- Ambika Basnet - Minister for Cooperatives and Poverty Alleviation (Kathmandu 3) Nepali Congress
- Bikram Pandey - Minister of Forests and Soil Conservation (Chitwan 3) Rastriya Prajatantra Party

=== Former Deputy Prime Ministers to lose in the election ===
- Ram Chandra Paudel (Nepali Congress)- Former Deputy Prime Minister of Nepal -lost from Tanahun 1 of Gandaki Province
- Bimalendra Nidhi (Nepali Congress)- Deputy Prime Minister of Nepal from 2016 to 2017 -lost from Dhanusha 3 of Province no 2
- Narayan Kaji Shrestha (CPN(Maoist Centre))-Deputy Prime Minister of Nepal from 2011 to 2011 -lost from Gorkha 1 of Gandaki Province
- Bam Dev Gautam (CPN(UML))- Deputy Prime Minister of Nepal from 2008 to 2009 and 2014-2015 -lost from Bardiya 1 of Lumbini Province

== Aftermath ==
The governing Nepali Congress preferred the upper house to be elected by Single Transferable Voting System while the left parties preferred majority vote. Lack of consensus meant the Legislature Parliament disbanded on 14 October, as required by the constitution, without approving National Assembly Election Bill which included provisions to elect members of the upper house.

According to Article 84 (8) of the Constitution of Nepal, at least one third of the total number of members elected to the Federal Parliament from each party must be women. Citing this provision, the Election Commission withheld announcing final results as the number of women each party needs to submit from their respective party lists could not be determined until the number of women in the upper house from each party was confirmed.

The government sent the National Assembly Election Ordinance to the President on 23 October 2017 with the provision that the upper house be elected using Single Transferable Voting System. The ordinance was held by the president for two months citing lack of consensus, but was ultimately approved on 29 December 2017. Another delay occurred because the electoral college for the election of the upper house includes members of the State Assemblies who, due to the absence of Chiefs of State, had not been able to take the oath of office until late January.

== See also ==
- 5th House of Representatives (Nepal)
