= 15th general convention of Nepali Congress =

2026 internal election of Nepali Congress

- 4–8 October 2026

50% + 1 votes needed to avoid a runoff
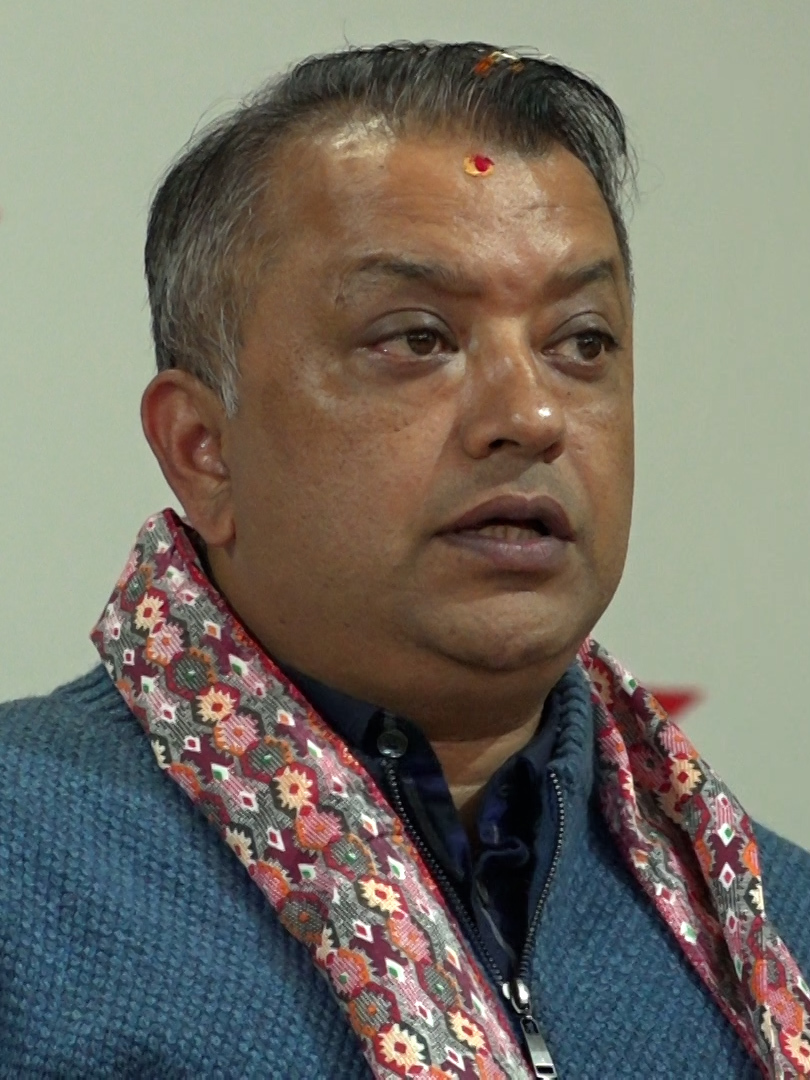

Candidate	Gagan Kumar Thapa	Shyam Krishna Khadgi
Votes	6,584	375
%	93.88	5.35
President before election
Gagan Thapa
Elected President
Gagan Thapa

Innagural session of 15th general convention of Nepali Congress

The 15th General Convention of the Nepali Congress was a national convention of Nepali Congress, it was held from 4 to 8 October 2026 at Khula Manch, Kathmandu. The convention began on 4 October at Khula Manch, where the inaugural ceremony was held. The country's largest democratic political party, the Congress selected the party's central leadership, including the central office bearers and Central Working Committee members. The party's general convention elected more than 350,000 elected leaders from across the country. Only in the ward committee, around 296,000 were elected.

Nearly 969,842 active members of the party throughout the country took part in this occasion from ward to national level. The total of 7,500 delegates were elected from 165 constituencies- which in turn voted to elect central level portfolios.

Preparations for the national convention began with lower-tier organizational elections, starting at the ward level across all 6,743 wards nationwide and progressing through municipal, provincial assembly, constituency, district and provincial conventions. Ahead of the national level of general convention, the party initiated nationwide active membership updates and digital verification across its 165 parliamentary constituencies. The number of active memberships, considered the foundation of the party, also reached 969,842.

== Background ==
=== Political context and internal reforms ===
Following the 14th General Convention in December 2021, the Nepali Congress experienced growing internal divisions over party leadership, organisational functioning and preparations for its next general convention. General Secretaries Gagan Thapa and Bishwa Prakash Sharma became increasingly critical of the party leadership and called for organisational and political reforms.

The 2025 Gen Z protests, which began on 8 September in response to corruption, poor governance, political privilege and a government ban on social media platforms, intensified pressure for political and institutional change. The protests resulted in widespread unrest, the deaths of dozens of people and the resignation of Prime Minister K. P. Sharma Oli, followed by the formation of an interim government. Within the Nepali Congress, the movement prompted renewed criticism of the party's political direction and calls for internal reform. Thapa, Sharma and other leaders argued that the party needed to respond to the demands expressed by the movement and undertake organisational and leadership changes.

In September 2025, party representatives began a campaign demanding a special general convention. The campaign was led by Thapa and senior leaders, and called for the party to restructure itself in response to the political developments and demands of the Gen Z movement. More than 40 percent of the party's general convention representatives, the threshold required under the party statute, eventually supported the demand. By October, 2,488 representatives, representing more than 54 percent of the total, had signed the demand. After negotiations between the party establishment and the reformist faction failed, Thapa and Sharma announced that they would proceed with a special general convention in January 2026.

The 2nd special convention of Nepali Congress was held at Bhrikutimandap in Kathmandu from 11 to 14 January 2026. It was convened by the Thapa–Sharma faction, while party president Sher Bahadur Deuba and leaders aligned with him opposed and boycotted the convention. The convention proposed dissolving the Central Working Committee elected at the 14th General Convention and establishing a new committee to serve until the 15th General Convention. It subsequently elected Gagan Thapa as president, with Bishwa Prakash Sharma and Pushpa Bhusal as vice presidents and Pradip Paudel and Gururaj Ghimire as general secretaries.

The special convention adopted proposals for extensive political and organisational reforms. These included internal primary elections for selecting party candidates, a digital system for candidate evaluation and recommendation, greater representation of women, youth, workers, professionals and persons with disabilities in party committees, and provisions for representation of different social and ethnic communities. It also endorsed a proposal to limit an individual to serving as prime minister for a maximum of two terms and called for corresponding amendments to the party statute and the Constitution. Thapa said the reforms were intended to respond to public dissatisfaction with established political parties and restore public confidence, particularly among younger generations.

The special convention resulted in a dispute over the legitimate leadership of the party. On 16 January 2026, the Election Commission of Nepal recognised the Central Working Committee elected by the special convention. The Supreme Court of Nepal subsequently upheld the recognition on 17 April before the 2026 general election, although it later granted a petition to review the decision in August. The dispute continued as the Thapa-led Nepali Congress proceeded with preparations for the 15th General Convention.

Following the special convention, the Thapa-led leadership introduced amendments to the party statute and began a new process of updating and distributing active memberships. The amended statute incorporated references to the aspirations of the 8–9 September 2025 Gen Z movement, including good governance, a corruption-free state structure, greater youth representation and political change. The party subsequently incorporated members of the Central Working Committee elected at the 14th General Convention who had not participated in the special convention, allowing previously divided leaders to participate in preparations for the 15th General Convention.

=== Delegate structure and representation ===
The 15th General Convention involved the election of over 350,000 executive office-bearers across all administrative levels. The bottom-up election hierarchy progresses through several stages:

- Ward level: An estimated 296,692 office-bearers were elected across Nepal's 6,743 wards.
- Constituency and district level: Each of the 165 House of Representatives constituencies elected 25 general convention delegates directly, alongside executive committees across all 77 districts. The 25 general convention delegated shall include representation of women, youths and minority.
- Provincial level: Delegates convened across the 7 provinces to form provincial executive committees.
- Central convention: A total of approximately 7,500 national delegates assembled in Kathmandu to elect the central office-bearers and CWC members.

=== Mandated inclusivity and youth quotas ===
To ensure diverse social and demographic representation, the updated party statute enforced strict inclusion criteria:

- Women's representation: A mandatory baseline of at least 33% representation for women was enforced across all committees and delegation tiers.
- Youth allocation: Specific reservation quotas ensured that members under the age of 40 hold at least 10–15% of delegate and committee positions.
- Social cluster proportionality: Delegate seats were allocated proportionately across eight designated clusters: Khas Arya, Adivasi Janajati, Madhesi, Dalit, Tharu, Muslim, Disability and Backward Regions.

== Central general convention delegates ==
Approximately 7,317 national delegates assembled in Kathmandu to elect the central office-bearers and central committee members and portfolios.

=== From House of Representatives constituency ===
In each House of Representatives constituency, delegates were chosen by the House of Representatives Constituency Convention from among its members.

==== Directly elected representatives ====
- 14 general delegates (including at least 4 women)
- 2 delegates representing workers, professional fields or subject-matter experts
- 3 youth delegates under the age of 35 (including at least 1 woman)
- 1 delegate representing persons with disabilities

==== Proportional representation ====
- 10 delegates elected on a proportional representation basis, matching the demographic composition of the constituency across inclusive clusters.

==== Ex-officio delegates ====
- The President of the House of Representatives Constituency Committee.
- The Presidents of Rural Municipality and Municipality Committees within that constituency.

=== From sister organizations ===
Delegates are elected through the national conventions of recognized party sister organizations as prescribed by party rules.

=== From overseas Nepali Janasamparka Samiti ===
Delegates are elected through the conventions of recognized overseas janasamparka committees.

=== Nominated delegates ===
- The Central President has the authority to nominate up to 75 active party members as Central Convention Delegates.
- These nominations shall prioritize representation for women, Dalit, Indigenous/Janjati, Madhesi, Muslim, Tharu, Khas Arya, persons with disabilities, backward regions, third gender individuals, distinguished experts/professionals, and martyrs' families or democracy movement participants

== Election timetable ==
Date	Events
18 August 2026	Finalization of general convention timeline
19–20 September 2026	Ward convention
22–24 September 2026	Municipal and Rural Municipal Conventions
26–27 September 2026	Provincial Assembly constituency conventions
28–29 September 2026	House of Representatives constituency conventions
30 September – 1 October 2026	District and Provincial Conventions
4–8 October 2026	15th Central General Convention

== Party President Election ==
S.N	Name	Votes		Percentage	Result	Reference
S.N	Name	Obtained	Total	Percentage	Result	Reference
1.	Gagan Kumar Thapa	6,584	6,959	94.60	Elected	
2.	Shyam Krishna Khadgi	375	6,959	5.40		

Total Delegates: 7,255 · Votes Cast: 7,013 (96.66%) · Valid Votes: 6,959 (99.23%) · Invalid Votes: 54 (0.77%)

== Central Committee Portfolio Election ==
S.N	Name	Votes	Result	Quota	Reference
Senior Vice-Chairperson (1)
1.	Bishwa Prakash Sharma	Unopposed	Elected	Open	

S.N	Rank	Name	Votes	Result	Category	Reference
Vice-Chairperson (4)
1	3	Govinda Bhattarai	1,752		Open (2)	
2	1	Dr. Chandra Bhandari	3,735	Elected	Open (2)	
3	7	Dr. Chandra Mohan Yadav	760		Open (2)	
4	6	Deepak Giri	923		Open (2)	
5	3	Dhanraj Gurung	1,596		Open (2)	
6	2	Madhu Prasad Acharya	2,342	Elected	Open (2)	
7	4	Surendra Raj Pandey	1,673		Open (2)	
1	2	Jiwan Pariyar	1,658		Inclusive (1)	
2	3	Farmullah Mansoor	1,144		Inclusive (1)	
3	1	Binod Chaudhary	1,745	Elected	Inclusive (1)	
4	5	Ranjeet Karna	562		Inclusive (1)	
5	4	Sita Gurung	1,112		Inclusive (1)	
1	1	Pushpa Bhusal Gautam	Unopposed	Elected	Female (1)	
General Secretary (3)
1	6	Amar Singh Pun	1,125		Open (2)	
2	2	Udaya Shumsher Rana	2,330	Elected	Open (2)	
3	4	Gururaj Ghimire	1,513		Open (2)	
4	5	Nain Singh Mahar	1,134		Open (2)	
5	1	Pradip Paudel	4,194	Elected	Open (2)	
6	7	Shankar Tiwari	123		Open (2)	
7	8	Dr. Santosh Upadhyaya	97		Open (2)	
8	3	Dr. Sunil Kumar Sharma	2,257		Open (2)	
1	1	Dr. Dila Sangraula	3,118	Elected	Female (1)	
2	2	Mahalaxmi Upadhyaya	2,864		Female (1)	
3	3	Rita Khanal	804		Female (1)	
Joint General Secretary (15)
1	2	Nanu Maya Bastola	1,554		Female (1)	
2	1	Pratima Gautam	5,116	Elected	Female (1)	
1	2	Ajaya Babu Shiwakoti	2,173	Elected	Open (2)	
2	7	Amrit Kumar Aryal	921		Open (2)	
3	4	Devendra Raj Kadel	1,381		Open (2)	
4	3	Dilli Ram Subedi	1,852		Open (2)	
5	6	Bikash Koirala	1,144		Open (2)	
6	9	Bimal Raj Chhetri	283		Open (2)	
7	8	Ramesh Prasad Dhamala	780		Open (2)	
8	1	Ram Hari Khatiwada	2,910	Elected	Open (2)	
9	5	Rajiv Dhungana	1,232		Open (2)	
1	2	Om Bahadur Gharti Magar	1,470		Indigenous (1)	
2	3	Taraman Gurung	877		Indigenous (1)	
3	4	Dilman Pakhrin	628		Indigenous (1)	
4	5	Prashant Man Singh Maskey	238		Indigenous (1)	
5	1	Bahadur Singh Lama	3,206	Elected	Indigenous (1)	
1	3	Narendra Pasawan	772		Dalit (1)	
2	1	Prakash Rasaili Snehi	4,803	Elected	Dalit (1)	
3	2	Man Bahadur Nepali	1,120		Dalit (1)	
1	1	Ajay Kumar Chaurasia	1,712	Elected	Madhesi (1)	
2	3	Abhishek Pratap Shah	1,210		Madhesi (1)	
3	4	Kiran Yadav	681		Madhesi (1)	
4	6	Nagina Yadav	405		Madhesi (1)	
5	8	Manish Kumar Mishra	197		Madhesi (1)	
6	2	Mahendra Yadav	1,483		Madhesi (1)	
7	7	Mukta Kumari Yadav	337		Madhesi (1)	
8	5	Ram Paltan Shah	631		Madhesi (1)	
1	2	Jagadishwar Narsingh KC	2,200		Khas Arya (1)	
2	3	Dinesh Koirala	1,248		Khas Arya (1)	
3	1	Manoj Mani Acharya	2,648	Elected	Khas Arya (1)	
4	4	Shubha Ram Basnet	535		Khas Arya (1)	
1	2	Teju Lal Chaudhary	1,970		Tharu (1)	
2	1	Yogendra Chaudhary	3,487	Elected	Tharu (1)	
3	3	Surendra Prasad Chaudhary	1,383		Tharu (1)	
1	3	Atahar Kamal Musalman	557		Muslim (1)	
2	2	Abdul Sattar	2,727		Muslim (1)	
3	1	Dr. Firdaush Alam	3,347	Elected	Muslim (1)	
1	2	Janak Raj Giri	1,370		Backwarded area (1)	
2	1	Jiwan Bahadur Shahi	3,906	Elected	Backwarded area (1)	
3	3	Narayan Prasad Bhattarai	721		Backwarded area (1)	
4	4	Rajan Kunwar	324		Backwarded area (1)	
5	5	Ram Bahadur Bista	260		Backwarded area (1)	
1	1	Angelu Sherpa	3,666	Elected	Minorities or disabled (1)	
2	2	Nagendra Kumar Kumal	2,104		Minorities or disabled (1)	
3	3	Baba Krishna Sapkota	1,065		Minorities or disabled (1)	

== See also ==
- Nepali Congress
- 2nd special convention of Nepai Congress
