= Prakash Rasaili =

Nepalese politician

Prakash Rasaili (Snehi)
- प्रकाश रसाइली (स्नेही)

Member of Parliament, House of Representatives
- In office 4 March 2018 – 18 September 2022
- Constituency: Party list

Joint General Secretary of Nepali Congress
- Incumbent
- Assumed office 29 October 2026
- President: Gagan Thapa

Personal details
- Born: 20 October 1975 (age 51) Bajhang District
- Party: Nepali Congress

Prakash Rasaili Snehi is a Nepalese politician, belonging to Nepali Congress party, who served as the member of the 1st Federal Parliament of Nepal. In the 2017 Nepalese general election, he was elected as a proportional representative from Dalit category.

He has been serving as the Joint General Secretary of the Nepali Congress party after winning the election in 15th general convention of the party.
