= Pradip Paudel =

Nepali politician

- प्रदिप पौडेल
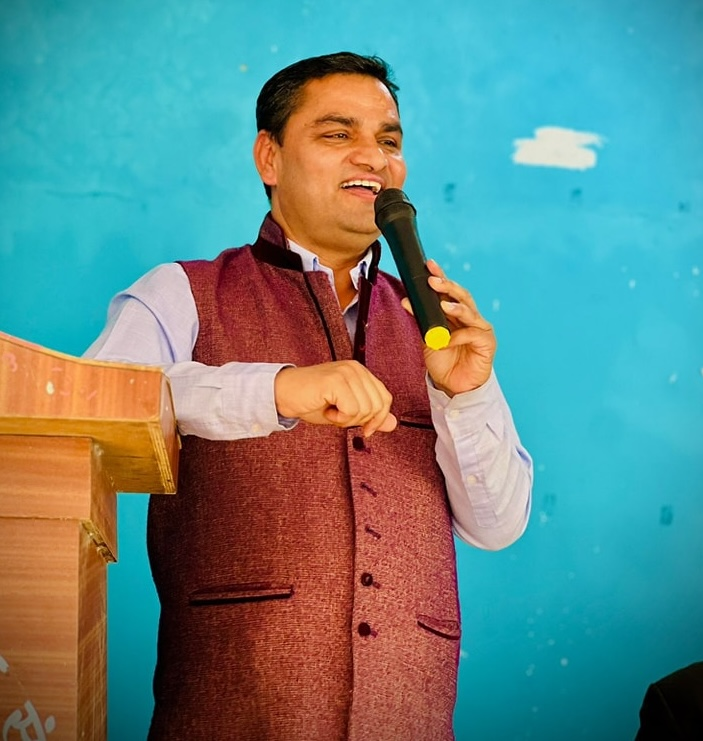

General Secreatary of Nepali Congress
- Incumbent
- Assumed office 16 January 2026 Serving with Dila Sangraula, Udaya Shumsher Rana
- President: Gagan Thapa
- Preceded by: Bishwa Prakash Sharma

Minister of Health and Population of Nepal
- In office 15 July 2024 – 9 September 2025
- President: Ram Chandra Poudel
- Prime Minister: KP Sharma Oli
- Preceded by: Pradeep Yadav
- Succeeded by: Sudha Sharma Gautam

Member of the House of Representatives
- In office 22 December 2022 – 12 September 2025
- Preceded by: Ishwar Pokhrel
- Succeeded by: Sasmit Pokharel
- Constituency: Kathmandu 5

Personal details
- Born: 27 March 1975 (age 51) Tanahun District, Nepal
- Party: Nepali Congress

Pradip Paudel (Nepali: प्रदिप पौडेल) is a Nepali politician and former Nepalese Minister of Health and Population. He has been serving as general secretary of Nepali Congress party since 2026 having been elected from special convention of party. He was elected to House of Representatives from Kathmandu 5 in 2022. Paudel began his political career with the Nepal Student Union, the student wing of the NC.

== Political career ==
Paudel started his political career as a Nepal Student Union (NSU) leader at the Amrit Campus in Kathmandu. He was first elected as a Free Student Union president in 1996. From 2000-2002, he served as a central committee member of the NSU. He was subsequently elected as the vice president of Nepal Student Union for three consecutive terms from 2002-2007, after which he served as president of the Nepal Student Union from 2007 to 2012.

In September 17, 2014, then Prime Minister Sushil Koirala appointed Paudel as a member of the NC Central Committee, bringing him to the forefront of national politics within the Congress Party.

In the 2017 Nepali Provincial Elections, Paudel placed his candidacy from Tanahun-2(A) for the Provincial Assembly of Gandaki Province. However, he lost the office by five votes to Asha Koirala of the Communist Party of Nepal (Maoist Centre).

In the 14th general convention of the NC held from December 13–15, 2021, Paudel ran for the office of General Secretary of the NC under the panel led by Sher Bahadur Deuba, however he lost the election to two youth politicians Gagan Thapa and Bishwa Prakash Sharma. He was once again appointed Central Committee Member of the NC party President Sher Bahadur Deuba.

In the 2022 Nepalese general election, he was elected as the member of the 2nd Federal Parliament of Nepal. He eventually supported the candidacy of Gagan Thapa for parliamentary party leader in the NC against Sher Bahadur Deuba voicing the need for youth and change in national politics.

In 2nd special convention of Nepali Congress he was elected as general secretary unanimously and again being elected in the same post in 15th general convention of the party.

=== Minister of Health (2024–2025) ===
Paudel was appointed Minister of Health and Population on 15 July 2024 in the cabinet of Prime Minister KP Sharma Oli. During his tenure, he announced plans to operationalise approximately 700 basic hospitals nationwide from 17 July 2025, supported by an annual recruitment of 2,500 health personnel and dedicated budget allocations. He has prioritised the modernisation of federal hospitals through extended outpatient services, online appointment systems, and digital health integration linking health records with national identity systems.

Paudel has also prioritised improving coordination between the federal, provincial, and local levels for healthcare delivery. His ministry has advanced plans to strengthen supply chain systems for essential medicines and medical equipment, and to expand telemedicine services in rural and mountainous regions. He has promoted the integration of various health databases to improve disease surveillance and resource allocation. Under his leadership, the Ministry has introduced measures to streamline public procurement in the health sector and to develop standard treatment guidelines aimed at reducing disparities in care across the country. Paudel has also overseen public awareness campaigns on preventive healthcare, nutrition, and maternal and child health, in line with the government's broader public health objectives.

== Electoral history ==
=== 2017 Nepalese provincial elections ===
Tanahun 2(B)
Party	Candidate	Votes
CPN (Maoist Centre)	Asha Koirala	16,646
Nepali Congress	Pradip Paudel	16,641
CPN (Marxist–Leninist)	Sobha Thapa Magar	1,039
Others		1,395
Invalid votes		1,357
Result	Maoist Centre gain	
Source: Election Commission

=== 2022 Nepali general election ===
Candidate	Party	Votes	%
Pradip Paudel	Nepali Congress	15,269	34.45
Ishwor Pokharel	CPN (UML)	10,190	22.99
Pranaya Shamsher Rana	Rastriya Swatantra Party	5,477	12.36
Ram Prasda Upreti	Rastriya Prajatantra Party	3,162	7.14
Shreeram Gurung	Independent	2,761	6.23
Hemraj Thapa	Independent	2,446	5.52
Sushant Shrestha	Independent	1,712	3.86
Shailesh Dangol	Nepal Workers Peasants Party	1,122	2.53
Others		2,177	4.91
Total		44,316	100.00
Majority		5,079	
Nepali Congress gain			

== See also ==
- 2nd special convention of Nepali Congress
- Gagan Thapa
