= Bishwa Prakash Sharma =

Nepali politician

- विश्वप्रकाश शर्मा

Senior Vice President of the Nepali Congress
- Incumbent
- Assumed office 29 October 2026
- President: Gagan Thapa
- Preceded by: Position established

Vice President of the Nepali Congress
- In office 14 January 2026 – 29 October 2026 Serving with Pushpa Bhusal Gautam
- President: Gagan Thapa
- Preceded by: Purna Bahadur Khadka; Dhanraj Gurung

General Secretary of the Nepali Congress
- In office 16 December 2021 – 14 January 2026 Serving with Gagan Kumar Thapa
- President: Sher Bahadur Deuba
- Preceded by: Shashanka Koirala; Purna Bahadur Khadka
- Succeeded by: Pradip Paudel; Gururaj Ghimire

Member of Parliament, House of Representatives
- In office 22 December 2022 – 12 September 2025
- Preceded by: Surendra Kumar Karki
- Succeeded by: Nisha Dangi
- Constituency: Jhapa 1

President of Nepal Student Union
- In office 2000–2002
- Succeeded by: Kishor Singh Rathore

Personal details
- Born: 21 December 1970 (age 55) Jhapa, Province No. 1, Nepal
- Party: Nepali Congress
- Spouse: Kabita Sharma
- Children: 1 Son, 1 Daughter
- Parent(s): Parshuram Sharma (father); Sabitri Sharma (mother)
- Education: Masters in Political Science
- Website: Official website

Bishwa Prakash Sharma (Nepali: विश्वप्रकाश शर्मा) is a Nepali politician. He is serving as the Senior Vice President of the Nepali Congress since 29 October 2026. Sharma served as member of House of Representatives from Jhapa 1 before the dissolution of the 6th House of Representatives.

== Political career ==
Sharma was elected general secretary along with Gagan Thapa in the 14th general convention of Nepali Congress. This was termed as rise of new generation in the oldest party of Nepal, the Nepali Congress.

Sharma has previously served as spokesperson of the party. He has also served as the national president of the Nepal Student Union (NSU).

In the 2022 Nepalese general election, he was elected as the member of the 2nd Federal Parliament of Nepal.

He was kicked from Nepali Congress by rival faction led by Sher Bahadur Deuba on 14 January 2026 for not following party rules and regulations. Later he was elected as vice president of the party along with Pushpa Bhusal from the 2nd special convention of Nepali Congress which was recognized by election commission later. He decided not to contest for 2026 general election citing moral grounds and to pave the way for younger and newer leaders.

Sharma was elected as Senior Vice President of Nepali Congress unopposed in 15th general convention of the party.

== Electoral history ==
Candidate	Party	Votes	%
Bishwa Prakash Sharma	Nepali Congress	39,624	51.41
Agni Prasad Kharel	CPN (UML)	25,349	32.89
Omnath Bhandari	Rastriya Swatantra Party	8,564	11.11
Santosh Tamang	Mongol National Organisation	1,577	2.05
Others		1,957	2.54
Total		77,071	100.00
Majority		14,275	
Nepali Congress gain			

== See also ==
- 2nd special convention of Nepali Congress
