= Bishwaraj Pokharel =

Nepalese Politician and former AIG of Nepal Police

- विश्वराज पोखरेल

Member of Parliament, Pratinidhi Sabha
- Elected
- Assumed office 27 March 2026
- Preceded by: Ram Hari Khatiwada
- Constituency: Okhaldhunga 1

Additional Inspector General of Police (AIG) at Nepal Police
- In office 10 December 2020 – 18 July 2022

Personal details
- Citizenship: Nepalese
- Party: Rastriya Swatantra Party
- Education: Bachelor of Laws; Master of Political Science
- Profession: Politician

Bishwaraj Pokharel (Note: Nepali: विश्वराज पोखरेल) is a Nepalese politician and former additional inspector general (AIG) of Nepal Police serving as a member of parliament from the Rastriya Swatantra Party. He is the member of the 3rd Federal Parliament of Nepal elected from Okhaldhunga 1 constituency in 2026 Nepalese General Election securing 13,953 votes and defeating Kumar Luitel of the Nepali Congress with a narrow margin of five votes.
