= Ajaya Babu Shiwakoti =

Nepali journalist and Nepali Congress central committee member

- अजयबाबु शिवाकोटी
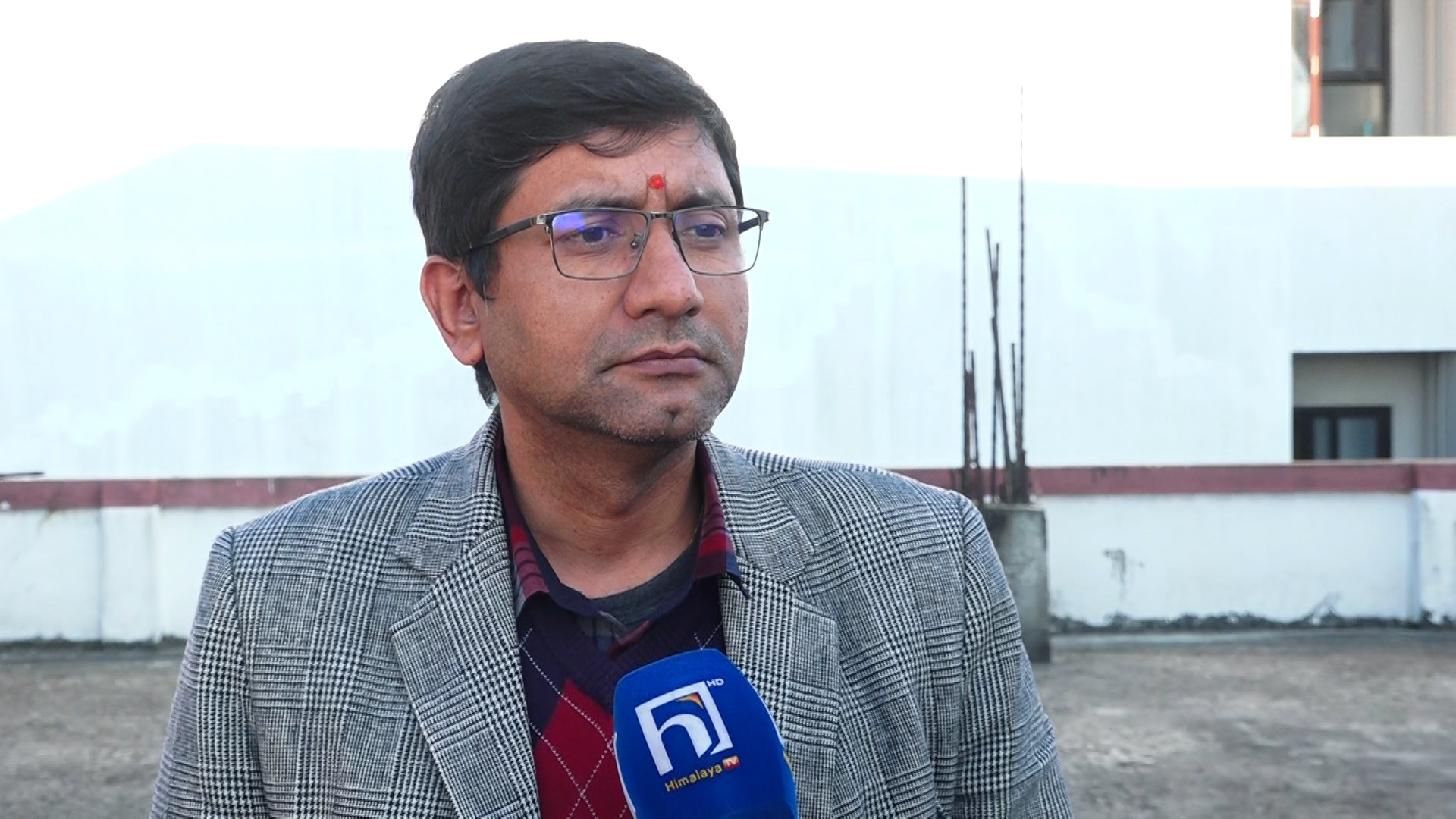

Joint General Secretary of the Nepali Congress
- Incumbent
- Assumed office 29 October 2026
- President: Gagan Thapa

Personal details
- Born: Dolakha, Nepal
- Party: Nepali Congress
- Education: Purbanchal University, (M.A.)

Ajaya Babu Shiwakoti (Nepali: अजयबाबु शिवाकोटी) is a Nepalese journalist and politician. He is the editor-in-chief of the online news portal Hamrakura and Joint General Secretary of the Nepali Congress party.

== Early life and education ==
Shiwakoti hails from Dolakha District in eastern Nepal. He completed a master's degree in Mass Communication and Journalism (MA-MCJ) from Purbanchal University.

== Career ==
=== Journalism ===
Shiwakoti is the founder and editor-in-chief of Hamrakura, an online news outlet established in 2010. In September 2019, Hamrakura published an exclusive report and interview with a Parliament Secretariat employee alleging rape by Speaker Krishna Bahadur Mahara, following which Mahara resigned and a formal complaint was lodged.

In February 2020, Hamrakura linked a leaked audio recording to then–communications minister Gokul Prasad Baskota, allegedly negotiating a multimillion-rupee bribe connected to security-printing procurement; Baskota resigned the next day. The International Federation of Journalists (IFJ) reported that Shiwakoti was threatened and placed under surveillance following his reporting.

Shiwakoti has also served as general secretary of the Nepal Press Union, where he advocated for journalists’ safety and media freedom.

=== Politics ===
Shiwakoti is an active member of the Nepali Congress, who also served as the Central Working Committee member of the party having been elected with 1,811 votes in the 14th General Convention. In the 15th general convention he was elected to the post of Joint General Secretary of the party.

In May 2023, Shiwakoti, along with other Congress leaders, pressed the party leadership under Sher Bahadur Deuba to hold a policy convention by mid-September, arguing that the party's credibility required adherence to its internal calendar. Again in August 2024, Shiwakoti joined a faction of Congress leaders demanding that the party leadership organize its General Convention on schedule, warning that delays could weaken both party unity and public trust. He is politically based in Dolakha District, where he has been involved in local party affairs. In the run-up to the 2022 provincial elections, his name was discussed during disputes over the Nepali Congress ticket allocation in Dolakha “Kha” constituency.

Beyond intra-party matters, Shiwakoti has spoken on wider public policy. In January 2025, he called on the government to provide free COVID-19 testing services and criticized barriers to public services tied to vaccination card requirements, arguing that such policies disproportionately harmed ordinary citizens.

== Awards ==
- Loktantra ra Patrakarita Puraskar (Democracy and Journalism Award), Tej Tirtha Trust (May 2020).
- Basu Rotary Vocational Good Governance Award (Rotary International District 3292, February 2021) for investigative reporting.

== See also ==
- Nepali Congress
- Gagan Thapa
- Media of Nepal
