= Nisha Dangi =

Nepalese politician

Honourable Nisha Dangi

Member of Parliament, Pratinidhi Sabha
- Incumbent
- Assumed office 26 March 2026
- Preceded by: Bishwa Prakash Sharma
- Constituency: Jhapa 1
- In office 22 December 2022 – 12 September 2025
- Constituency: Party list

Joint General Secretary of the Rastriya Swatantra Party
- Incumbent
- Assumed office 26 June 2026 Serving with Hari Dhakal; Asim Shah
- President: Rabi Lamichhane

Personal details
- Born: Bhadrapur, Jhapa District
- Party: Rastriya Swatantra
- Parents: Bhim Bahadur (father); Devi Maya (mother)

Nisha Dangi (Note: Nepali: निशा डाँगी) is a Nepalese politician. She is the member of the 3rd Federal Parliament of Nepal elected from Jhapa-1 constituency in 2026 Nepalese General Election securing 45,680 votes. In the 2022 Nepalese general election she was elected to member of parliament as a proportional representative from the Khas people category.

Dangi was elected as Joint General Secretary of the Rastriya Swatantra Party at the party's first general convention held in Chitwan on 26 June 2026.
