= Gururaj Ghimire =

Nepalese politician

Honourable Gururaj Ghimire
- गुरुराज घिमिरे

General Secretary of Nepali Congress
- In office 12 January 2026 – 29 October 2026
- President: Gagan Kumar Thapa
- Preceded by: Gagan Kumar Thapa; Bishwa Prakash Sharma
- Succeeded by: Udaya Shumsher Rana

Personal details
- Party: Nepali Congress
- Occupation: Politician

Gururaj Ghimire (Nepali: गुरुराज घिमिरे) is a Nepalese politician from Nepali Congress. Ghimire served as the general secretary of the party after being elected from the 2nd special convention. He was defeated by Santosh Rajbanshi from Morang 4 during 2026 general election.

He received his school education at Birendra Secondary School in Amardaha where he developed an interest in student politics. During his school years, he became involved in the Nepal Students Union (नेविसंघ), the student wing affiliated with the Nepali Congress.

Ghimire continued his higher education at Mahendra Morang Campus in Biratnagar and later earned a master's degree. His involvement in student activism contributed to his development as a political leader. In 2002 (2059 B.S.), he became the central president of the Nepal Students Union, marking an important stage in his political career and establishing his position within the Nepali Congress.

His early involvement in student activism shaped his political career. He later became the central president of the Nepal Students Union in 2002 (2059 B.S.), building his reputation as a student leader before entering the wider leadership of the Nepali Congress.

== See also ==
- Gagan Thapa
