= Udaya Shumsher Rana =

Nepalese politician

- उदय शमशेर राणा
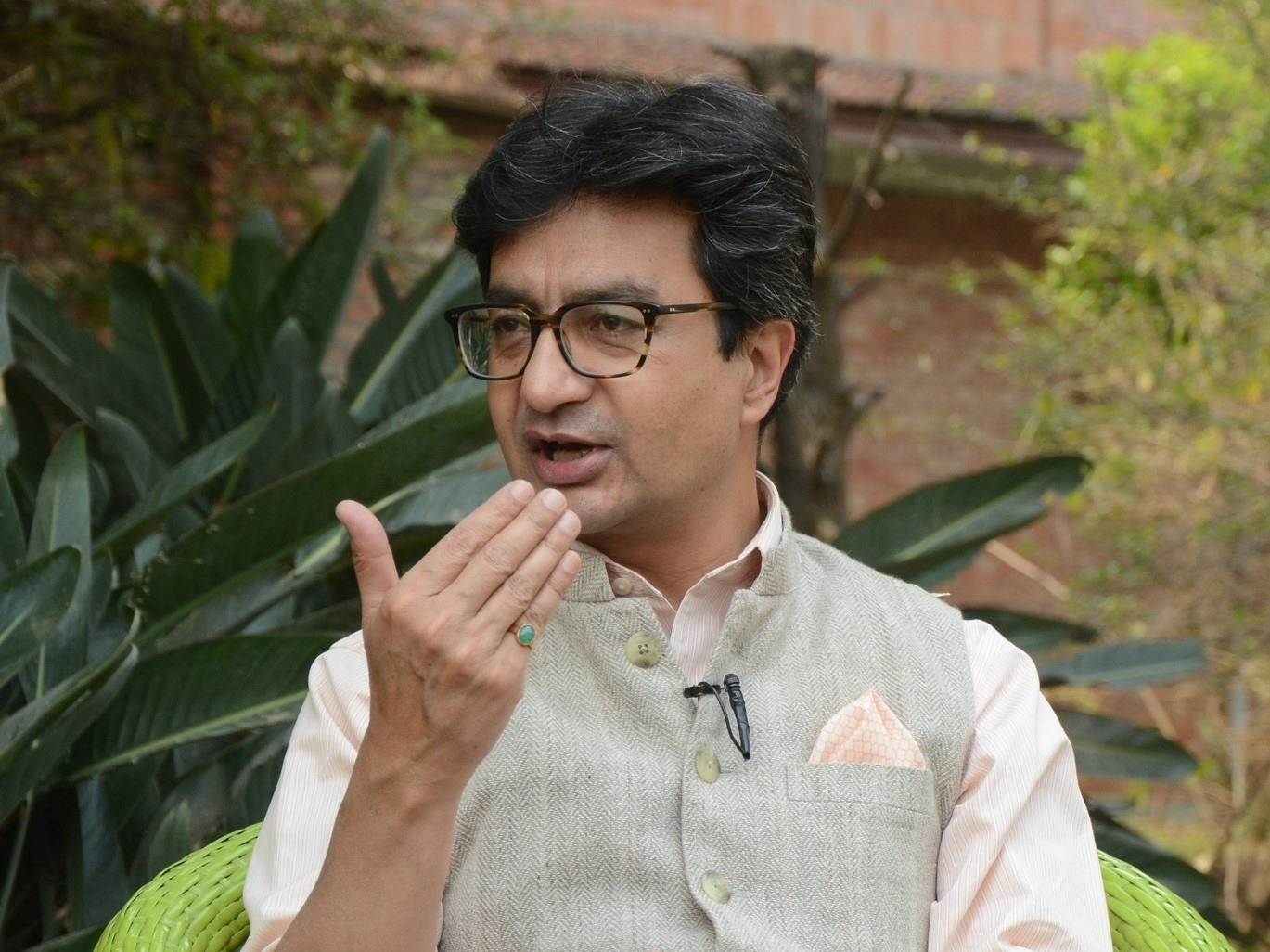

General Secretary of the Nepali Congress
- Incumbent
- Assumed office 29 October 2026 Serving with Pradip Paudel, Dila Sangraula
- President: Gagan Thapa

Minister of State for Finance
- In office 22 August 2017 – 15 February 2018
- President: Bidya Devi Bhandari
- Prime Minister: Sher Bahadur Deuba

Member of Parliament, House of Representatives
- In office 22 December 2022 – 12 September 2025
- Preceded by: Nawaraj Silwal
- Succeeded by: Buddha Ratna Maharjan
- Constituency: Lalitpur 1

Member of 2nd Nepalese Constituent Assembly
- In office 21 January 2014 – 14 October 2018
- Preceded by: Barsaman Pun
- Succeeded by: Nawaraj Silwal
- Constituency: Lalitpur 1

President of Nepal Tarun Dal
- In office 5 February 2012 – 15 November 2016
- Appointed by: Sushil Koirala
- President: Sushil Koirala, Sher Bahadur Deuba
- Preceded by: Mahendra Yadav
- Succeeded by: Jeet Jung Basnet

Personal details
- Born: February 27, 1970 (age 56) Lalitpur
- Party: Nepali Congress
- Spouse: Urvashi Singh Rana
- Children: Ayush SJB Rana, Samar SJB Rana
- Education: Cornell University, St Stephen's College, The Lawrence School, Sanawar, St. Joseph's School, Darjeeling, St. Xavier's School, Jawalakhel
- Website: http://udayarana.com

Udaya Shumsher Rana (Nepali: उदय शमशेर राणा; born 1970) is a Nepali politician who is serving as the General Secretary of the Nepali Congress. He previously served as Minister of State for Finance from August 2017 to February 2018.

== Early life ==
=== Personal life ===
Rana was born in Lalitpur, Bagmati Province, to Sagar SJB Rana and Brinda Rana. He has spent most of his formative life in both Nepal and India. He is married to Urvashi Singh Rana and they have two sons Ayush and Samar.

=== Education ===
He received his primary education from St. Xavier's School Jawalakhel, Lalitpur. For his secondary education he was sent to St Joseph's College (North Point) in Darjeeling and completed his high school from Lawrence School, Sanawar, India. He received his undergraduate (Bachelors in Arts) from St Stephen's College, University of Delhi and holds a master's degree from Cornell University, Ithaca, New York (USA). He wrote his thesis on Nepal's foreign policy vis-à-vis India and China, which was titled "Foreign Policy of Nepal: Emphasis on relations with India and China”.

=== Career ===
Rana has various publications in both Nepali and English in leading Nepali news media and has worked as a consultant to various NGO/INGOs including The Asia Foundation, SNV Nepal, ESPS/DANIDA and others. He is currently the Advisor to the Nepal Shooting Association.

== Political career ==
Just like many Nepali Congress leaders, his political activism commenced in India. During his educational sojourn in Delhi, he established and became the first President of Nepal Students Union, Delhi (Student organization of Nepali Congress Party). In Delhi, he instigated protests and took out rallies in support of the ‘First People's Movement of 1989’ against the autocratic Panchayat System. His interest in global politics and economics led him to join the International Union of Socialist Youth (IUSY) and later was elected as the Vice President. Upon returning to Nepal he devoted majority of his young days in grassroots politics. By 1998, he was already affiliated to Nepal Tarun Dal and was serving as the district president. While being a member of NTD, he fought his first Constitutional Assembly (CA) elections from Lalitpur Constituency No. 1 in 2008. He lost by a narrow margin of thousand votes. Unfazed by his early loss, he redeemed himself in the Second CA elections in 2013 by defeating by opponent by a little more than 8000 votes. His victory in 2013 started his legislative career. He is currently working as a Central Working Committee Member of Nepali congress. He was elected as the Central Working Committee Member with popular votes at 14th General Convention of the Nepali Congress.

He served as Minister of State for Finance from August 2017 to February 2018. He served as president of Nepal Tarun Dal, the youth wing of Nepali Congress, from February 2012 to November 2016.

As a member of parliament, he was a member of the Finance Committee 2014–17 and was also a member of three sub-committees that finalized bills that was passed by the parliament as an Act, which are as follows:

- Banking and Financial Institute Act (BAFIA) 2015
- Cooperative Act 2017
- Recommended amendments for the Procurement Act to the PMO.
- He went on to serve as a Minister of State for Finance from 2017 to 2018.

In 2nd special convention of the Nepali Congress in January 2026, he was elected as Joint General Secretary of the party. Following the 15th general convention he was elected as the general secretary of the party.

== Comparative table of elections ==
Elections	Parliament of Nepal	Constituency	Political party	Result	Vote percentage	Opposition		
Elections	Parliament of Nepal	Constituency	Political party	Result	Vote percentage	Candidate	Political party	Vote percentage
2008	1st CA	Lalitpur 1	NC	Lost	30.54%	Barshaman Pun	Maoist Center	33.42%
2013	2nd CA	Lalitpur 1	NC	Won	42.11%	Madhusudan Paudel	CPN(UML)	24.23%
2017	5th	Lalitpur 1	NC	Lost	42.21%	Nawaraj Silwal	CPN(UML)	54.87%
2022	6th	Lalitpur 1	NC	Won	48.98%	Nawaraj Silwal	CPN(UML)	39.52
2026	7th	Lalitpur 1	NC	Lost	27.26%	Buddha Ratna Maharjan	RSP	47.13%

== Electoral history ==
2026 House of Representatives Election - Lalitpur 1

Candidate	Party	Votes	%
Buddha Ratna Maharjan	Rastriya Swatantra Party	23,373	47.13
Udaya Shumsher Rana	Nepali Congress	13,520	27.26
Chet Nath Sanjel	CPN (UML)	6,546	13.20
Padam Kumar Lama	Ujyaalo Nepal Party	2,686	5.42
Sunil Maharjan	Nepali Communist Party	1,964	3.96
Sajina Karki	Rastriya Prajatantra Party	652	1.31
Others		855	1.72
Total		49,596	100.00
Valid votes		49,596	96.03
Invalid/blank votes		2,049	3.97
Total votes		51,645	100.00
Registered voters/turnout		77,737	66.44
Majority		9,853	
Rastriya Swatantra Party gain			

2022 House of Representatives Election- Lalitpur 1

Candidate	Party	Votes	%
Udaya Shumsher Rana	Nepali Congress	23,892	48.98
Nawaraj Silwal	CPN (UML)	19,278	39.52
Sachin Kumar Ghimire	Rastriya Swatantra Party	3,277	6.72
Sandeep Acharya	Rastriya Prajatantra Party	1,641	3.36
Others		693	1.42
Total		48,781	100.00
Valid votes		48,781	96.44
Invalid/blank votes		1,802	3.56
Total votes		50,583	100.00
Registered voters/turnout		50,773	99.63
Majority		4,614	
Nepali Congress gain			

2017 House of Representatives Election Lalitpur – 1

Party	Candidate	Votes	Status
CPN (UML)	Nawaraj Silwal	26,951	Elected
Nepali Congress	Udaya Shumsher Rana	20,729	Lost

2013 Constituent Assembly Election Lalitpur – 1

Party	Candidate	Votes	Status
Nepali Congress	Udaya Shumsher Rana	18,560	Elected
CPN (UML)	Madhusudan Poudel	10,682	Lost

2008 Constituent Assembly Election Lalitpur – 1

Party	Candidate	Votes	Status
Communist Party of Nepal (Maoist)	Barshaman Pun	15,329	Elected
Nepali Congress	Udaya Shumsher Rana	14,011	Lost
