= Rabin Koirala =

Nepali politician

- रविन कोइराला

Member of House of Representatives (Nepal)
- In office 2013–2017
- Preceded by: Dharma Prasad Ghimire
- Succeeded by: Surendra Kumar Karki
- Constituency: Jhapa 1

1st Mayor of Mechinagar
- In office 14 May 1997 – 4 October 2003
- Deputy Mayor: Chandra Bhandari
- Preceded by: Create Posting
- Succeeded by: Kalyan Khadka

Personal details
- Party: CPN (UML)

Rabin Koirala is a Nepalese politician, belonging to the CPN (UML). He is a former Member of Parliament, elected in 2013, and a former Mayor of Mechinagar.
