= Ram Karki =

Nepali politician

- राम कार्की

Ministry of Information and Communications
- In office 25 August 2016 - 31 May 2017
- President: Bidhya Devi Bhandari
- Prime Minister: Pushpa Kamal Dahal
- Preceded by: Sher Dhan Rai
- Succeeded by: Mohan Bahadur Basnet

Member of Parliament, Pratinidhi Sabha
- In office 4 March 2018 – Nov 2022
- Preceded by: Rabin Koirala
- Succeeded by: Bishwa Prakash Sharma
- Constituency: Jhapa 1

Member of Constituent Assembly for UCPN (Maoist) party list
- In office 21 January 2014 – 14 October 2017

Personal details
- Born: Surendra Kumar Karki; 16 October 1956 (age 70) Rumjatar, Okhaldhunga, Nepal
- Party: Pragatisheel Loktantrik Party
- Other political affiliations: Nepali Congress; CPN (Maoist Centre)
- Occupation: Politician

Ram Karki (Nepali: राम कार्की( पार्थ)), (born 16 October 1956) also known as Surendra Kumar Karki, is a Nepali politician belonging to Marxist School of Praxis which he along with some left leaning youth formed leaving the post secretary of CPN (Maoist Centre) party. From August 2016 to May 2017 he served as the minister for Information and Communications of Nepal.

== Personal life and early career ==
Karki was born on 14 October 1956, at Rumjatar of Okhaldhunga district. He remained underground for 10 years during the decade-long insurgency in the country. He has been active in politics for the past 35 years, and held several posts within the Maoist party. He was the party's Chief of International Bureau for many years.

He was a nominated MP in the early 2010s, and later Minister for Communication. He is considered an intellectual leader focused on creating modern Maoist party manifestos and interpretations of Marxist theory. He is married to former secretary (IAS) govt.of Sikkim Dr. Sherap Shenga, who was born and raised in Sikkim, India. Together they have a son and a daughter. Karki currently lives in Dhulabari, Jhapa.

== Electoral history ==
=== 2017 legislative elections ===
Jhapa 1
| Party | Candidate | Votes |
|---|---|---|
| CPN (Maoist Centre) | Surendra Kumar Karki | 36,173 |
| Nepali Congress | BIshwa Prakash Sharma | 33,310 |
| Mongol National Organisation | Santosh Tamang | 1,389 |
| Federal Socialist Forum, Nepal | Bhakta Bahadur Limbu | 1,044 |
| Others | | 483 |
| Invalid votes | | 2,667 |
| Result | Maoist Centre gain | |
Source: Election Commission

== See also ==
- Pragatisheel Loktantrik Party
