= Buddha Ratna Maharjan =

Nepalese politician

The Honourable Buddha Ratna Maharjan
- बुद्ध रत्न महर्जन

Member of Parliament, Pratinidhi Sabha
- Incumbent
- Assumed office 26 March 2026
- Preceded by: Udaya Shumsher Rana
- Constituency: Lalitpur 1

Personal details
- Citizenship: Nepalese
- Party: Rastriya Swatantra Party
- Profession: Politician

Buddha Ratna Maharjan (Nepali: बुद्ध रत्न महर्जन) is a Nepalese politician serving as a member of parliament from the Rastriya Swatantra Party. He is the member of the 7th Pratinidhi Sabha elected from Lalitpur 1 constituency in 2026 Nepalese General Election securing 23,373 votes and defeating his closest contender Udaya Shumsher Rana of the Nepali Congress.
