= Lalitpur 1 =

Parliamentary Constituencies in Nepal

- Parliamentary constituency for the House of Representatives
- Lalitpur 1 in Bagmati Province

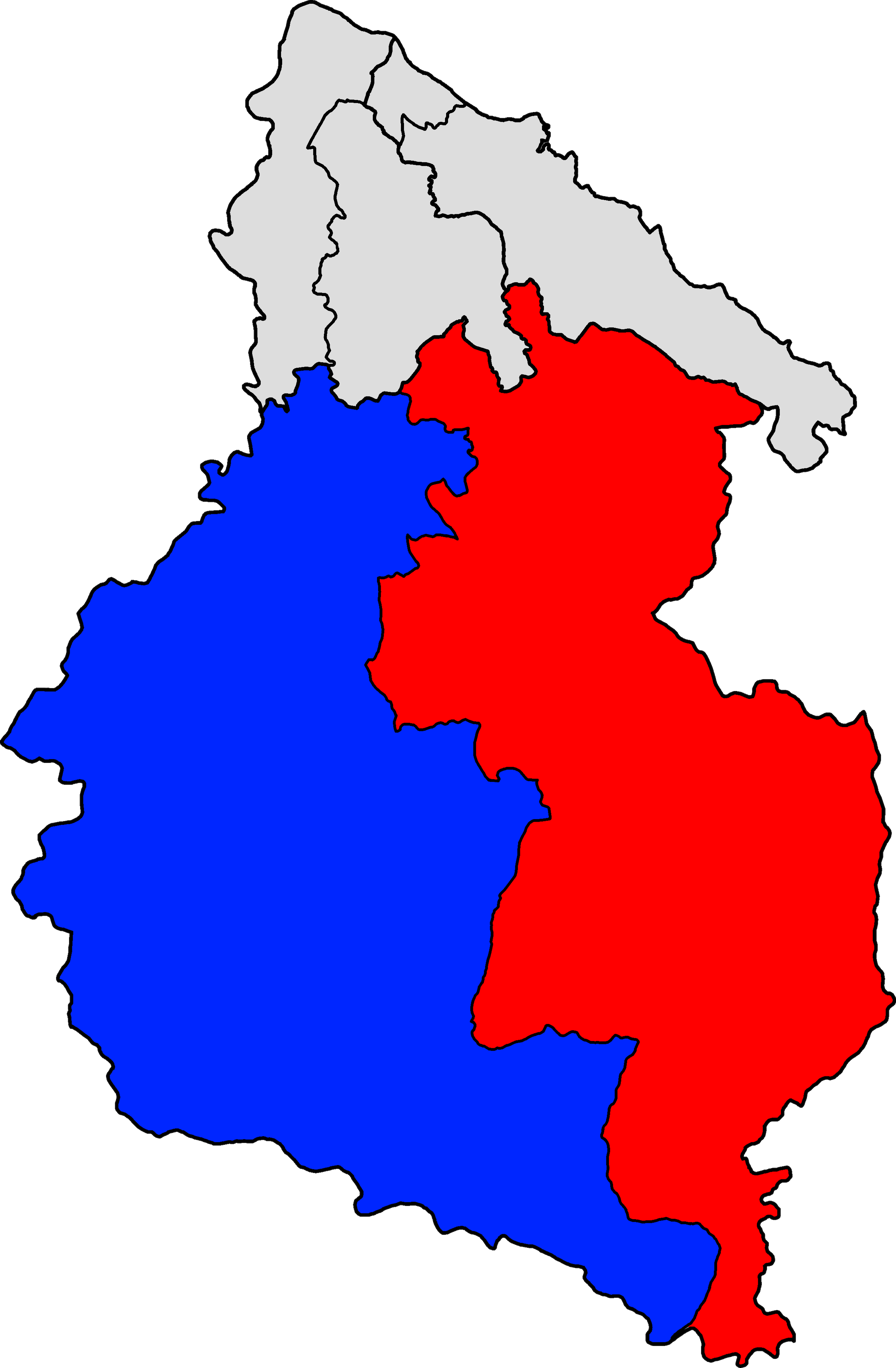
- Assembly segments Lalitpur 1(A) (red) and Lalitpur 1(B) (blue) within Lalitpur District
- Province: Bagmati Province
- District: Lalitpur District
- Electorate: 77,737

Current constituency
- Created: 1991
- Party: Rastriya Swatantra Party
- MP: Buddha Ratna Maharjan
- Bagmati MPA 1(A): Lal Kumari Pun (NCP)
- Bagmati MPA 1(B): Chet Nath Sanjal (NCP)

Lalitpur 1 is one of three parliamentary constituencies of Lalitpur District in Nepal. This constituency came into existence on the Constituency Delimitation Commission (CDC) report submitted on 31 August 2017.

== Incorporated areas ==
Lalitpur 1 parliamentary constituency consists of Mahankal Rural Municipality, Bagamti Rural Municipality, Konjyosom Rural Municipality and wards 1–11 and 13 of Godawari Municipality.

== Assembly segments ==
It encompasses the following Bagmati Provincial Assembly segment

- Lalitpur 1(A)
- Lalitpur 1(B)

== Members of Parliament ==
=== Parliament/Constituent Assembly ===
Election	Member	Party
1991	Mitha Ram Sharma Bajgain	CPN (Unified Marxist–Leninist)
1999	Sushila Nepal	CPN (Unified Marxist–Leninist)
2008	Barsaman Pun	CPN (Maoist)
January 2009	Barsaman Pun	UCPN (Maoist)
2013	Udaya SJB Rana	Nepali Congress
2017	Nawaraj Silwal	CPN (Unified Marxist–Leninist)
May 2018	Nawaraj Silwal	Nepal Communist Party
March 2021	Nawaraj Silwal	CPN (Unified Marxist–Leninist)
2022	Udaya SJB Rana	Nepali Congress
2026	Buddha Ratna Maharjan	Rastriya Swatantra Party

=== Provincial Assembly ===
==== 1(A) ====
Election	Member	Party
2017	Lal Kumari Pun	CPN (Maoist Centre)
May 2018	Lal Kumari Pun	Nepal Communist Party

==== 1(B) ====
Election	Member	Party
2017	Chet Nath Sanjal	CPN (Unified Marxist–Leninist)
May 2018	Chet Nath Sanjal	Nepal Communist Party

== Election results ==
=== Election in the 2020s ===
==== 2026 general election ====
Candidate	Party	Votes	%
Buddha Ratna Maharjan	Rastriya Swatantra Party	23,373	47.13
Udaya Shumsher Rana	Nepali Congress	13,520	27.26
Chet Nath Sanjel	CPN (UML)	6,546	13.20
Padam Kumar Lama	Ujyaalo Nepal Party	2,686	5.42
Sunil Maharjan	Nepali Communist Party	1,964	3.96
Sajina Karki	Rastriya Prajatantra Party	652	1.31
Others		855	1.72
Total		49,596	100.00
Valid votes		49,596	96.03
Invalid/blank votes		2,049	3.97
Total votes		51,645	100.00
Registered voters/turnout		77,737	66.44
Majority		9,853	
Rastriya Swatantra Party gain			

==== 2022 general election ====
Candidate	Party	Votes	%
Udaya Shumsher Rana	Nepali Congress	23,892	48.98
Nawaraj Silwal	CPN (UML)	19,278	39.52
Sachin Kumar Ghimire	Rastriya Swatantra Party	3,277	6.72
Sandeep Acharya	Rastriya Prajatantra Party	1,641	3.36
Others		693	1.42
Total		48,781	100.00
Valid votes		48,781	96.44
Invalid/blank votes		1,802	3.56
Total votes		50,583	100.00
Registered voters/turnout		50,773	99.63
Majority		4,614	
Nepali Congress gain			

=== Election in the 2010s ===
==== 2017 legislative elections ====
Party	Candidate	Votes
CPN (Unified Marxist–Leninist)	Nawaraj Silwal	26,951
Nepali Congress	Udaya SJB Rana	20,729
Others		1,435
Invalid votes		1,856
Result	CPN (UML) gain	
Source: Election Commission

==== 2017 Nepalese provincial elections ====
===== 1(A) =====
Party	Candidate	Votes
CPN (Maoist Centre)	Lal Kumari Pun	13,185
Nepali Congress	Rishi Ram Ghimire	10,591
Others		972
Result	Maoist Centre	
Source: Election Commission

===== 1(B) =====
Party	Candidate	Votes
CPN (Unified Marxist–Leninist)	Chet Nath Sanjal	12,866
Nepali Congress	Min Krishna Maharjan	11,742
Others		356
Result	CPN UML) gain	
Source: Election Commission

==== 2013 Constituent Assembly election ====
Party	Candidate	Votes
Nepali Congress	Udaya SJB Rana	18,560
CPN (Unified Marxist–Leninist)	Madhusudan Paudel	10,682
UCPN (Maoist)	Hari Dahal	6,196
Rastriya Prajatantra Party Nepal	Keshav Bahadur Bista	6,007
Others		2,633
Result	Congress gain	
Source: NepalNews

=== Election in the 2000s ===
==== 2008 Constituent Assembly election ====
Party	Candidate	Votes
CPN (Maoist)	Barsaman Pun	15,329
Nepali Congress	Udaya SJB Rana	14,011
CPN (Unified Marxist–Leninist)	Madhusudan Paudel	11,342
Rastriya Prajatantra Party	Shyam Prasad Timilsina	2,476
CPN (Marxist–Leninist)	Shante Man Syangtal	1,375
Others		1,337
Invalid votes		1,617
Result	Maoist gain	
Source: Election Commission

=== Election in the 1990s ===
==== 1999 legislative elections ====
Party	Candidate	Votes
CPN (Unified Marxist–Leninist)	Sushila Nepal	13,893
Independent	Keshar Bahadur Bista	9,975
Nepali Congress	Sagar Shamsher Rana	8,576
Rastriya Prajatantra Party	Krishna Bahdur Deshar	7,781
Others		947
Invalid Votes		546
Result	CPN (UML) hold	
Source: Election Commission

==== 1994 legislative elections ====
Party	Candidate	Votes
CPN (Unified Marxist–Leninist)	Mitha Ram Sharma Bajgain	11,633
Nepali Congress	Sagar Shamsher Rana	9,882
Rastriya Prajatantra Party	Badri Bahadur K.C.	6,624
Independent	Harihar Singh	4,206
Others		811
Result	CPN (UML) hold	
Source: Election Commission

==== 1991 legislative elections ====
Party	Candidate	Votes
CPN (Unified Marxist–Leninist)	Mitha Ram Sharma Bajgain	12,416
Rastriya Prajatantra Party (Thapa)	Keshar Bahadur Bista	8,251
Result	CPN (UML) gain	

== See also ==
- List of parliamentary constituencies of Nepal
