= Pushpa Raj Pokharel =

Nepali politician

- पुष्पराज पोखरेल

Mayor of Bhadrapur.
- In office 1997–1996

Members of House of Representatives
- In office 1994–1999
- Preceded by: Krishna Prasad Sitaula
- Succeeded by: Krishna Prasad Sitaula
- Constituency: Jhapa 1

Personal details
- Party: Communist Party of Nepal (Unified Marxist–Leninist)

Pushpa Raj Pokharel is a Nepalese politician, belonging to the CPN (UML). He is a former Member of Parliament and a former Mayor of Bhadrapur.
