= Okhaldhunga 1 =

Parliamentary constituency in Nepal

- Parliamentary constituency
- Okhaldhunga 1 in Koshi Province
- Province: Koshi Province
- District: Okhaldhunga District

Current constituency
- Created: 1991
- Party: Rastriya Swatantra Party
- Member of Parliament: Bishwaraj Pokharel
- Koshi MPA 1(A): Pradeep Kumar Sunuwar (NC)
- Koshi MPA 1(B): Baburam Gautam (MC)

Okhaldhunga 1 is the parliamentary constituency of Okhaldhunga District in Nepal. This constituency came into existence on the Constituency Delimitation Commission (CDC) report submitted on 31 August 2017.

== Incorporated areas ==
Okhaldhunga 1 incorporates the entirety of Okhaldhunga District.

== Assembly segments ==
It encompasses the following Province No. 1 Provincial Assembly segment

- Okhaldhunga 1(A)
- Okhaldhunga 1(B)

== Members of Parliament ==
=== Parliament/Constituent Assembly ===
Election	Member	Party
1991	Bal Raj Karki	Nepali Congress
1994	Chandra Kanta Dahal	Nepali Congress
1999	Hom Nath Dahal	Nepali Congress
2008	Keshav Rai	CPN (Maoist)
January 2009	Keshav Rai	UCPN (Maoist)
2013	Yagya Raj Sunuwar	CPN (Unified Marxist–Leninist)
May 2018	Yagya Raj Sunuwar	Nepal Communist Party
2022	Ram Hari Khatiwada	Nepali Congress
2026	Bishwaraj Pokharel	Rastriya Swatantra Party

=== Provincial Assembly ===
==== 1(A ====
Election	Member	Party
2017	Rajan Rai	CPN (Unified Marxist-Leninist)
May 2018	Rajan Rai	Nepal Communist Party

==== 1(B) ====
Election	Member	Party
2017	Ram Kumar Rai	CPN (Maoist Centre)
May 2018	Ram Kumar Rai	Nepal Communist Party

== Election results ==
=== Election in the 2020s ===
==== 2026 general election ====
Candidate	Party	Votes	%
Bishwaraj Pokharel	RSP	13,953	25.11
Kumar Luitel	Congress	13,948	25.10
Ambir Babu Gurung	NCP	11,296	20.33
Asmita Thapa	CPN (UML)	10,720	19.29
Uddhav Kumar Rai	SSP	3,858	6.94
Others		1,795	3.23
Total		55,570	100.00
Registered voters/turnout		122,659	–
Majority		5	
RSP gain			

==== 2022 general election ====
Candidate	Party	Votes	%
Ram Hari Khatiwada	Nepali Congress	33,556	53.62
Yagya Raj Sunuwar	CPN (UML)	26,738	42.72
Others		2,291	3.66
Total		62,585	100.00
Majority		6,818	
Nepali Congress gain			

=== Election in the 2010s ===
==== 2017 legislative elections ====
Party	Candidate	Votes
CPN (Unified Marxist–Leninist)	Yagya Raj Sunuwar	32,580
Nepali Congress	Ram Hari Khatiwada	27,327
Others		1,781
Invalid votes		4,095
Result	CPN (UML) hold	
Source: Election Commission

==== 2017 Nepalese provincial elections ====
===== 1(A) =====
Party	Candidate	Votes
CPN (Unified Marxist–Leninist)	Ambir Babu Gurung	18,908
Nepali Congress	Mitra Sen Dahal	11,906
Others		651
Invalid votes		1,121
Result	CPN (UML) gain	
Source: Election Commission

===== 1(B) =====
Party	Candidate	Votes
Communist Party of Nepal (Maoist Centre)	Mohan Kumar Khadka	15,485
Nepali Congress	Pradip Kumar Sunuwar	13,711
Independent	Gyanendra Rumdali	1,858
Others		609
Invalid votes		1,504
Result	Maoist Centre gain	
Source: Election Commission

==== 2013 Constituent Assembly election ====
Party	Candidate	Votes
CPN (Unified Marxist–Leninist)	Yagya Raj Sunuwar	12,943
Nepali Congress	Bal Krishna Dahal	9,943
UCPN (Maoist)	Keshav Rai	2,963
Others		1,869
Result	CPN (UML) gain	
Source: NepalNews

=== Election in the 2000s ===
==== 2008 Constituent Assembly election ====
Party	Candidate	Votes
CPN (Maoist)	Keshav Rai	11,635
Nepali Congress	Bal Krishna Dahal	9,054
CPN (Unified Marxist–Leninist)	Yagya Raj Sunuwar	8,920
Others		1,921
Invalid votes		1,488
Result	Maoist gain	
Source: Election Commission

=== Election in the 1990s ===
==== 1999 legislative elections ====
Party	Candidate	Votes
Nepali Congress	Hom Nath Dahal	16,111
CPN (Unified Marxist–Leninist)	Chabbi Lal Karki	10,282
Rastriya Prajatantra Party	Champak Sunuwar	3,188
Independent	Ambir Babu Gurung	2,446
Others		554
Invalid Votes		815
Result	Congress hold	
Source: Election Commission

==== 1994 legislative elections ====
Party	Candidate	Votes
Nepali Congress	Chandra Kanta Dahal	8,691
CPN (Unified Marxist–Leninist)	Prem Narayan Premi	7,587
Independent	Gopal Rai	5,708
Rastriya Prajatantra Party	Bhola Man Singh	4,017
Others		905
Result	Congress hold	
Source: Election Commission

==== 1991 legislative elections ====
Party	Candidate	Votes
Nepali Congress	Bal Raj Karki	19,228
CPN (Unified Marxist–Leninist)	Peshal Kumar Khatiwada	6,056
Result	Congress gain	

== See also ==
- List of parliamentary constituencies of Nepal
