= Jhapa 1 =

Parliamentary constituency in Koshi Province, Nepal

- Parliamentary constituency
- Jhapa 1 in Koshi Province
- Province: Koshi
- District: Jhapa District
- Electorate: 131,067

Current constituency
- Created: 1991
- Party: Rastriya Swatantra Party
- Member of Parliament: Nisha Dangi
- Koshi MPA 1(A): Gopal Tamang (Nepali Congress)
- Koshi MPA 1(B): Sabina Bajagain (Rastriya Prajatantra Party)

Jhapa 1 is one of five parliamentary constituencies of Jhapa District in Nepal. This constituency came into existence on the Constituency Delimitation Commission (CDC) report submitted on 31 August 2017.

== Incorporated areas ==
Jhapa 1 incorporates Mechinagar Municipality, ward 9 and 10 of Bhadrapur Municipality and wards 4–7 of Buddhashanti Rural Municipality.

== Assembly segments ==
It encompasses the following Province No. 1 Provincial Assembly segment

- Jhapa 1(A)
- Jhapa 1(B)

== Members of Parliament ==
=== Parliament/Constituent Assembly ===
Election	Member	Party
1991	Drona Prasad Acharya	CPN (Unified Marxist–Leninist)
1994 by-election	Krishna Prasad Sitaula	Nepali Congress
1994	Pushpa Raj Pokharel	CPN (Unified Marxist–Leninist)
1999	Krishna Prasad Sitaula	Nepali Congress
2008	Dharma Prasad Ghimire	CPN (Maoist)
January 2009	Dharma Prasad Ghimire	UCPN (Maoist)
2013	Rabin Koirala	CPN (Unified Marxist–Leninist)
2017	Surendra Kumar Karki	CPN (Maoist Centre)
May 2018	Surendra Kumar Karki	Nepal Communist Party
March 2021	Surendra Kumar Karki	CPN (Maoist Centre)
2022	Bishwa Prakash Sharma	Nepali Congress
2026	Nisha Dangi	Rastriya Swatantra Party

=== Provincial Assembly ===
==== 1(A) ====
Election	Member	Party
2017	Shri Prasad Mainali	CPN (Unified Marxist-Leninist)
May 2018	Shri Prasad Mainali	Nepal Communist Party
March 2021	Shri Prasad Mainali	CPN (Unified Marxist–Leninist)
2022	Gopal Tamang	Nepali Congress

==== 1(B) ====
Election	Member	Party
2017	Gopal Chandra Budhathoki	CPN (Unified Marxist-Leninist)
May 2018	Gopal Chandra Budhathoki	Nepal Communist Party
March 2021	Gopal Chandra Budhathoki	CPN (Unified Marxist–Leninist)
2022	Sabina Bhajgai	Rastriya Prajatantra Party

== Election results ==
=== Election in the 2020s ===
==== 2026 general election ====
Candidate	Party	Votes	%
Nisha Dangi	Rastriya Swatantra Party	45,680	58.35
Keshab Raj Pandey	Nepali Congress	10,550	13.48
Kebalram Rai	Shram Sanskriti Party	10,004	12.78
Ramchandra Upreti	CPN (UML)	7,659	9.78
Hemraj Karki	Rastriya Prajatantra Party	1,612	2.06
Santosh Tamang	Mongol National Organisation	971	1.24
Ashesh Ghimire	Nepali Communist Party	922	1.18
Naresh Kumar Lawati	Ujyaalo Nepal Party	485	0.62
Olin Rajbanshi	Nepal Sadbhawana Party	109	0.14
Man Bahadaur Sawa Limbu	Sanghiya Loktantrik Rastriya Manch	99	0.13
Durga Bahadaur Sawa Limbu	Independent	84	0.11
Rama Meche	Janata Samajbadi Party, Nepal	43	0.05
Ganesh Kumar Kharel	Independent	33	0.04
Hiranya Prasad Bhattarai	Nepal Majdoor Kisan Party	23	0.03
Khandru Karuwa	Nepal Janamukti Party	17	0.02
Total		78,291	100.00
Valid votes		78,291	94.80
Invalid/blank votes		4,296	5.20
Total votes		82,587	100.00
Registered voters/turnout		131,067	63.01
Majority		35,130	
Rastriya Swatantra Party gain			

==== 2022 general election ====
Candidate	Party	Votes	%
Bishwa Prakash Sharma	Nepali Congress	39,624	51.41
Agni Prasad Kharel	CPN (UML)	25,349	32.89
Omnath Bhandari	Rastriya Swatantra Party	8,564	11.11
Santosh Tamang	Mongol National Organisation	1,577	2.05
Others		1,957	2.54
Total		77,071	100.00
Majority		14,275	
Nepali Congress gain			

==== 2022 provincial election ====
===== 1(A) =====
Candidate	Party	Votes	%
Gopal Tamang	Nepali Congress	23,045	49.93
Rabin Koirala	CPN (UML)	18,657	40.42
Sagar Rai	Mongol National Organisation	2,452	5.31
Meera Karki	People's Socialist Party	924	2.00
Gangalal Rajbanshi	Loktantrik Samajwadi Party	763	1.65
Others	318	0.69	
Total		46,159	100.00
Majority		4,388	
Nepali Congress			

===== 1(B) =====
Candidate	Party	Votes	%
Sabina Bajgai	Rastriya Prajatantra Party	13,612	43.65
Shyambir Limbu	CPN (Maoist Centre)	12,225	39.21
Pradeep Rai	Sanghiya Loktantrik Rastriya Manch	1,193	3.83
Mohan Singh Limbu	Mongol National Organisation	1,112	3.57
Hira Prasad Pokharel	Independent	1,036	3.32
Om Prakash Khapung	People's Socialist Party	981	3.15
Others	1,023	3.28	
Total		31,182	100.00
Majority		1,387	
Rastriya Prajatantra Party			

=== Election in the 2010s ===
==== 2017 legislative elections ====
Party	Candidate	Votes
CPN (Maoist Centre)	Surendra Kumar Karki	36,173
Nepali Congress	BIshwa Prakash Sharma	33,310
Mongol National Organisation	Santosh Tamang	1,389
Federal Socialist Forum, Nepal	Bhakta Bahadur Limbu	1,044
Others		483
Invalid votes		2,667
Result	Maoist Centre gain	
Source: Election Commission

==== 2017 Nepalese provincial elections ====
===== 1(A) =====
Party	Candidate	Votes
CPN (Unified Marxist–Leninist)	Shri Prasad Mainali	22,972
Nepali Congress	Keshav Raj Pandey	17,240
Mongol National Organisation	Bhaskar Rai	1,153
Others		2,475
Invalid votes		1,509
Result	CPN (UML) gain	
Source: Election Commission

===== 1(B) =====
Party	Candidate	Votes
CPN (Unified Marxist–Leninist)	Gopal Chandra Budhathoki	17,839
Nepali Congress	Ashok Kumar Pokharel	9,978
Others		1,791
Invalid votes		933
Result	CPN (UML) gain	
Source: Election Commission

==== 2013 Constituent Assembly election ====
Party	Candidate	Votes
CPN (Unified Marxist–Leninist)	Rabin Koirala	17,229
Nepali Congress	Bishwa Prakash Sharma	16,540
UCPN (Maoist)	Bodh Raj Dahal	6,858
Federal Socialist Party, Nepal	Dhan Prasad Gurung	1,979
Rastriya Prajatantra Party Nepal	Ashok Subba	1,463
Others		2,351
Result	CPN (UML) gain	
Source: NepalNews

=== Election in the 2000s ===
==== 2008 Constituent Assembly election ====
Party	Candidate	Votes
CPN (Maoist)	Dharma Prasad Ghimire	15,276
Nepali Congress	Narendra Bikram Nemwang	14,283
CPN (Unified Marxist–Leninist)	Naresh Kharel	14,028
CPN (Marxist–Leninist)	Badri Prasad Upreti	1,638
Others		3,414
Invalid votes		2,792
Result	Maoist gain	
Source: Election Commission

=== Election in the 1990s ===
==== 1999 legislative elections ====
Party	Candidate	Votes
Nepali Congress	Krishna Prasad Sitaula	17,561
CPN (Unified Marxist–Leninist)	Narayan Rajbanshi	15,300
Rastriya Prajatantra Party	Rajendra Prasad Lingden	5,625
Rastriya Janamukti Party	Gyan Bahadur Imbung	2,708
Nepal Sadbhawana Party	Surya Narayan Ganesh	2,272
CPN (Marxist–Leninist)	Dhyan Bahadur Rai	2,168
Independent	Jagat Bahadur Shrestha	1,417
Others		515
Invalid Votes		1,249
Result	Congress gain	
Source: Election Commission

==== 1994 legislative elections ====
Party	Candidate	Votes
CPN (Unified Marxist–Leninist)	Pushpa Raj Pokharel	15,652
Nepali Congress	Krishna Prasad Sitaula	14,511
Rastriya Prajatantra Party	Devi Raman Bhattarai	5,390
Nepal Sadbhawana Party	Jivan Singh Rajbanshi	3,869
Rastriya Janamukti Party	Ram Prasad Chauiwainwa	2,776
Independent	Jhatan Singh Rajbanshi	176
Result	CPN (UML) gain	

===== 1994 by-election =====
Candidate	Party	Votes	%
Krishna Prasad Sitaula	Nepali Congress	16,194	37.68
Leela Udaasi	CPN (UML)	13,337	31.03
Gopal Chandra Rajbanshi	Rastriya Prajatantra Party	8,251	19.20
Tularam Singh	Nepal Sadbhawana Party	4,970	11.56
N/A	CPN (United)	166	0.39
N/A	Prajatantrik Lok Dal	58	0.13
Total		42,976	100.00
Valid votes		42,976	87.05
Invalid/blank votes		6,393	12.95
Total votes		49,369	100.00
Registered voters/turnout		67,869	72.74
Nepali Congress gain			

==== 1991 legislative elections ====
Party	Candidate	Votes
CPN (Unified Marxist–Leninist)	Drona Prasad Acharya	13,721
Nepali Congress	Krishna Prasad Sitaula	9,827
Result	CPN (UML) gain	

== See also ==
- List of parliamentary constituencies of Nepal
