= Dila Sangraula =

Nepali politician

- डिला संग्रौला पंत

General Secretary, Nepali Congress
- Incumbent
- Assumed office 29 October 2026 Serving with Udaya Shumsher Rana, Pradip Paudel
- President: Gagan Thapa

Member of the House of Representatives
- In office 22 December 2022 – 12 September 2025
- President: Ram Chandra Paudel
- Prime Minister: Pushpa Kamal Dahal; KP Sharma Oli
- Constituency: Proportional Representation Party List

Deputy General Secretary,Nepali Congress
- In office January, 2026 – October, 2026
- President: Gagan Thapa
- Preceded by: Mahalaxmi Upadhyay 'Dina'
- Succeeded by: Pratima Gautam

President of the Nepal Woman Association
- In office 5 February 2012 – 16 September 2016
- Appointed by: Sushil Koirala
- President: Sushil Koirala, Sher Bahadur Deuba
- Preceded by: Ambika Basnet
- Succeeded by: Uma Regmi

Personal details
- Born: 26 May 1963 (age 63) Morang District
- Party: Nepali Congress
- Education: Tribhuvan University (PhD)

Dila Sangraula Pant (Nepali: डिला संग्रौला पंत) is a Nepali politician serving as the General Secretary of Nepali Congress and a member of the House of Representatives of the federal parliament of Nepal. In May 2019, she was elected the minister of labour of the shadow cabinet formed by the main opposition of the parliament, Nepali Congress.

She served as the president of Nepal Woman Association, the women wing of Nepali Congress from 2012 to 2016.
