= Krishna Prasad Sitaula =

Nepali politician

- कृष्ण प्रसाद सिटौला
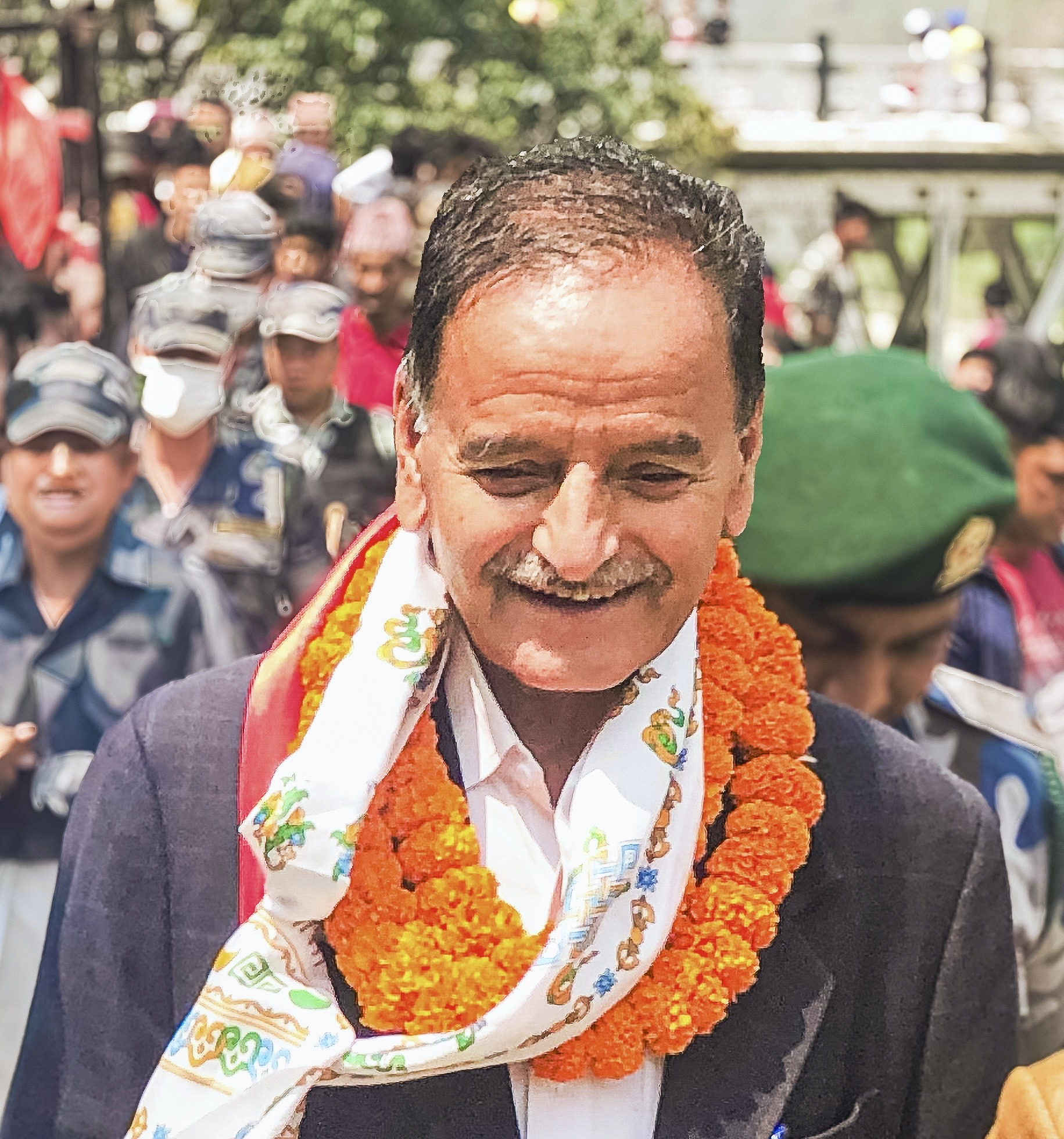
- Krishna Prasad Sitaula at the inauguration ceremony of the Dolalghat Grand Tourism Fair and Dolalghat Festival on 14 April 2019.

Deputy Prime Minister of Nepal
- In office 6 May 2012 – 29 May 2012 Serving with Bijay Kumar Gachhadar, Narayan Kaji Shrestha and Ishwar Pokhrel
- President: Ram Baran Yadav
- Prime Minister: Baburam Bhattarai
- Preceded by: Bharat Mohan Adhikari (Mar–Aug. 2011); Upendra Yadav (May–Aug. 2011); Narayan Kaji Shrestha (1–29 Aug. 2011)
- Succeeded by: Bam Dev Gautam (2014) (Note: There was no deputy prime minister from 14 March 2013 until 25 February 2014.); Prakash Man Singh (2014)

Leader of the Opposition in the National Assembly
- In office 9 March 2024 – 15 July 2024
- Leader: Sher Bahadur Deuba
- Preceded by: Devendra Dahal
- Succeeded by: Narayan Kaji Shrestha
Ministerial offices
Minister of Defence of Nepal
In office 18 May 2012 – 29 May 2012
President	Ram Baran Yadav
Prime Minister	Baburam Bhattarai
Preceded by	Bijay Kumar Gachhadar
Succeeded by	Baburam Bhattarai
Minister of Law, Justice, Constituent Assembly and Parliamentary Affairs of Nepal
In office 18 May 2012 – 29 May 2012
President	Ram Baran Yadav
Prime Minister	Baburam Bhattarai
Preceded by	Sushma Sharma Ghimire
Succeeded by	Hari Prasad Neupane
Minister of Home Affairs of Nepal
In office 29 April 2006 – 18 August 2008
Monarch	King Gyanendra
Prime Minister	Girija Prasad Koirala
Preceded by	Dan Bahadur Shahi
Succeeded by	Bam Dev Gautam
Minister of Industry, Commerce and Supplies of Nepal
In office 30 September 2007 – 18 August 2008
Monarch	King Birendra
Prime Minister	Girija Prasad Koirala
Preceded by	Rajendra Mahato
Succeeded by	Astalaxmi Shakya (Note: As Minister of Industry); Rajendra Mahato (Note: As Minister of Commerce and Supplies)
Other senior positions
General Secretary of the Nepali Congress
In office 2010–2016 Serving with Prakash Man Singh
President	Sushil Koirala
Preceded by	Ram Baran Yadav; Kul Bahadur Gurung; Bimalendra Nidhi
Succeeded by	Shashanka Koirala; Purna Bahadur Khadka

Member of the Parliament, National Assembly
- Incumbent
- Assumed office 4 March 2024
- Category: Open
- Class: III
- Preceded by: Ramesh Jung Rayamajhi
- Constituency: Koshi province

Member of the House of Representatives
- In office 1994–1994
- Preceded by: Drona Prasad Acharya
- Succeeded by: Pushpa Raj Pokharel
- Constituency: Jhapa 1
- In office 1999–2008
- Preceded by: Pushpa Raj Pokharel
- Succeeded by: Dharma Prasad Ghimire
- Constituency: Jhapa 1
- In office 2013–2017
- Preceded by: Purna Prasad Rajbansi
- Succeeded by: Rajendra Prasad Lingden
- Constituency: Jhapa 3

Personal details
- Born: 10 November 1946 (age 79) Terhathum District
- Party: Nepali Congress
- Spouse: Kabita Situala (since 1979)
- Children: 1 son, 2 daughters
- Parents: Ranga Prasad Sitaula (father); Gaura Devi Sitaula (mother)
- Education: Bachelor of Law (LLB) Degrees from Tribhuvan University

Krishna Prasad Sitaula (Nepali: कृष्ण प्रसाद सिटौला) is a Nepali politician, belonging to the Nepali Congress. He is the Member of Parliament of in the upper house, the National Assembly.

== Political career ==
Sitaula was nominated as the party's General Secretary by President Sushil Koirala. He served as Home Minister from 2006 to 2008 and later briefly held the position of Deputy Prime Minister in May 2012 under the cabinet of Baburam Bhattarai.

Sitaula won the 1994 by-elections and the 1999 elections from Jhapa 1. He had won from Jhapa 3 in the second constituent assembly election.

Sitaula lost the 2017 elections to Rajendra Prasad Lingden, who had forged an alliance with CPN (UML).

== See also ==
- Nepali Congress (Deuba Faction)
