= Yagya Raj Sunuwar =

Nepali politician

- यज्ञराज सुनुवार

Member of Parliament, Pratinidhi Sabha
- In office 4 March 2018 – 18 September 2022
- Constituency: Okhaldhunga 1

Member of Constituent Assembly
- In office 21 January 2017 – 14 October 2017
- Preceded by: Keshav Rai
- Constituency: Okhaldhunga 1

Personal details
- Born: 19 October 1972 (age 53)
- Party: CPN (UML)

Yagya Raj Sunuwar is a Nepalese politician and Communist Party member of the Nepal House of Representatives. He was elected from Okhaldhunga-1, Province No. 1. He defeated Nepali Congress leader Ram Hari Khatiwada with 5,253 votes.
