= Drona Prasad Acharya =

Nepali politician

Member of Parliament, Pratinidhi Sabha
- In office 1991–1994
- Preceded by: Post created
- Succeeded by: Krishna Prasad Sitaula
- Constituency: Jhapa 1

Personal details
- Party: CPN (UML)

Drona Prasad Acharya was a Nepalese politician, writer and journalist from Bhadrapur. He was elected to the parliament in the 1991 election as a Communist Party of Nepal (Unified Marxist-Leninist) candidate in the Jhapa-1 constituency with 13721 votes (34.22%).
