= Pratima Gautam =

Nepalese politician

Member of Parliament, House of Representatives
- In office 22 December 2022 – 12 September 2025
- Constituency: PR list

Joint General Secretary of the Nepali Congress
- Incumbent
- Assumed office 29 October 2026
- President: Gagan Thapa

Personal details
- Party: Nepali Congress
- Parents: Ram Prasad Gautam (father); Dr. Maya Gautam (mother)

Pratima Gautam is a Nepalese politician, serving as the Joint General Secretary of the Nepali Congress Party. She served as Member of Parliament of the 2nd Federal Parliament of Nepal. In the 2022 Nepalese general election she was elected as a proportional representative from the Khas people category.
