= Dharma Prasad Ghimire =

Nepali politician

Member of House of Representatives (Nepal)
- In office 2008–2013
- Preceded by: Krishna Prasad Sitaula
- Succeeded by: Rabin Koirala
- Constituency: Jhapa 1

Personal details
- Party: Communist Party of Nepal (Maoist)

Dharma Prasad Ghimire (Nepali: धर्म प्रसाद घिमिरे) is a Nepalese politician, belonging to the Communist Party of Nepal. In the 2008 Constituent Assembly election he was elected from the Jhapa-1 constituency, winning 15276 votes.
