= Bhadrapur =

Bhadrapur may refer to:

- Bhadrapur, Birbhum, West Bengal
- Bhadrapur, Mahakali, a village development committee in Dadeldhura District in the Mahakali Zone of western Nepal
- Bhadrapur, Mechi, a town and municipality in Jhapa District in the Mechi Zone of southeastern Nepal
