= Amar Singh Pun =

Nepalese politician

Amar Singh Pun is a Nepali politician belonging to Nepali Congress and a former Minister of state for Irrigation of Nepal. He is the former member of 2nd Nepalese Constituent Assembly and current party chairman of Lumbini Province committee.
