= Nawaraj Silwal =

Nepali politician

- नवराज सिलवाल

Member of Parliament, Pratinidhi Sabha
- In office 4 March 2018 – 18 September 2022
- Constituency: Lalitpur 1

Personal details
- Born: August 24, 1963 (age 62) Lalitpur District, Nepal
- Party: CPN (UML)

Nawaraj Silwal is a Nepalese Politician, former DIG of Nepal Police and serving as the Member Of House Of Representatives (Nepal) elected from Lalitpur-1, Province No. 3. He is member of the Nepal Communist Party.
