= Nepal Student Union =

College student wing of Nepali Congress Party

Nepal Students' Union नेपाल विद्यार्थी संघ
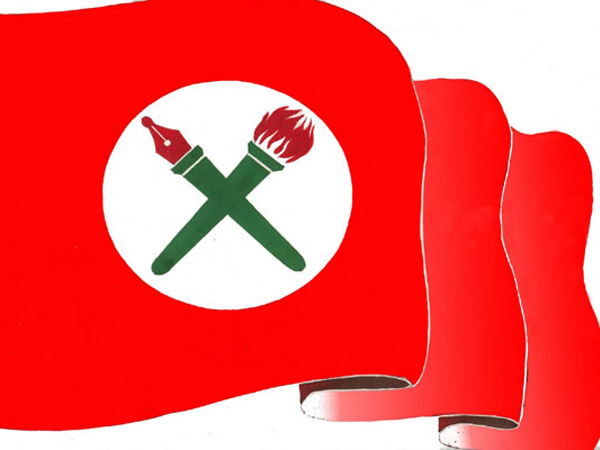
- NSU flag
- Abbreviation: NSU
- Founded: 19 April 1970; 56 years ago
- Founders: Bipin Koirala; Marshall Julum Shakya; Sher Bahadur Deuba
- Purpose: Democratic socialism Student interests
- Headquarters: Kathmandu, Nepal
- President: Karauna Katuwal
- Parent organisation: Nepali Congress
- Affiliations: International Union of Socialist Youth

Nepal Students' Union (abbr. NSU) is the largest student political wing in Nepal. The Nepal Student's Union represents the Nepali Congress. During the autocratic King's rule (Panchayati Byawastha), the union played a major role in unifying students to overthrow King's direct rule and establish democracy in the country.

After winning elections in the main campuses of Tribhuvan University, Mid-West University, Pokhara University, Far Western University, and a few associated colleges, the Nepal Students’ Union (NSU) turned out to be the biggest student organization in Nepal.

== History ==
The organization was formed during autocratic Panchayat era. It was formed in April 19 1970. Because of the prohibition and possible interruption from the Panchayat the first meeting was held in Swyambhu and the second in Chovar. The second day meeting was held in Pashupatinath where the flag, statute and the naming of NSU was discussed. Krishna Prasad Bhattarai was the chief guest of the opening ceremony and the convention was financed by Subarna Shamsher Rana.

The first major student movement was held in 1979 for the sake of Free Student Union and for the restoration of democracy in Nepal. The first president of Nepal student union was Bipin Koirala who was sworn in the post in 1970. In the year 1971, Sher Bahadur Deuba became the second president of the Nepal student union and Bal Bahadur KC was appointed as an Executive Chairman by B. P. Koirala (Party President) while Bimalendra Nidhi, a Madheshi face lead NSU during the 1980 referendum.

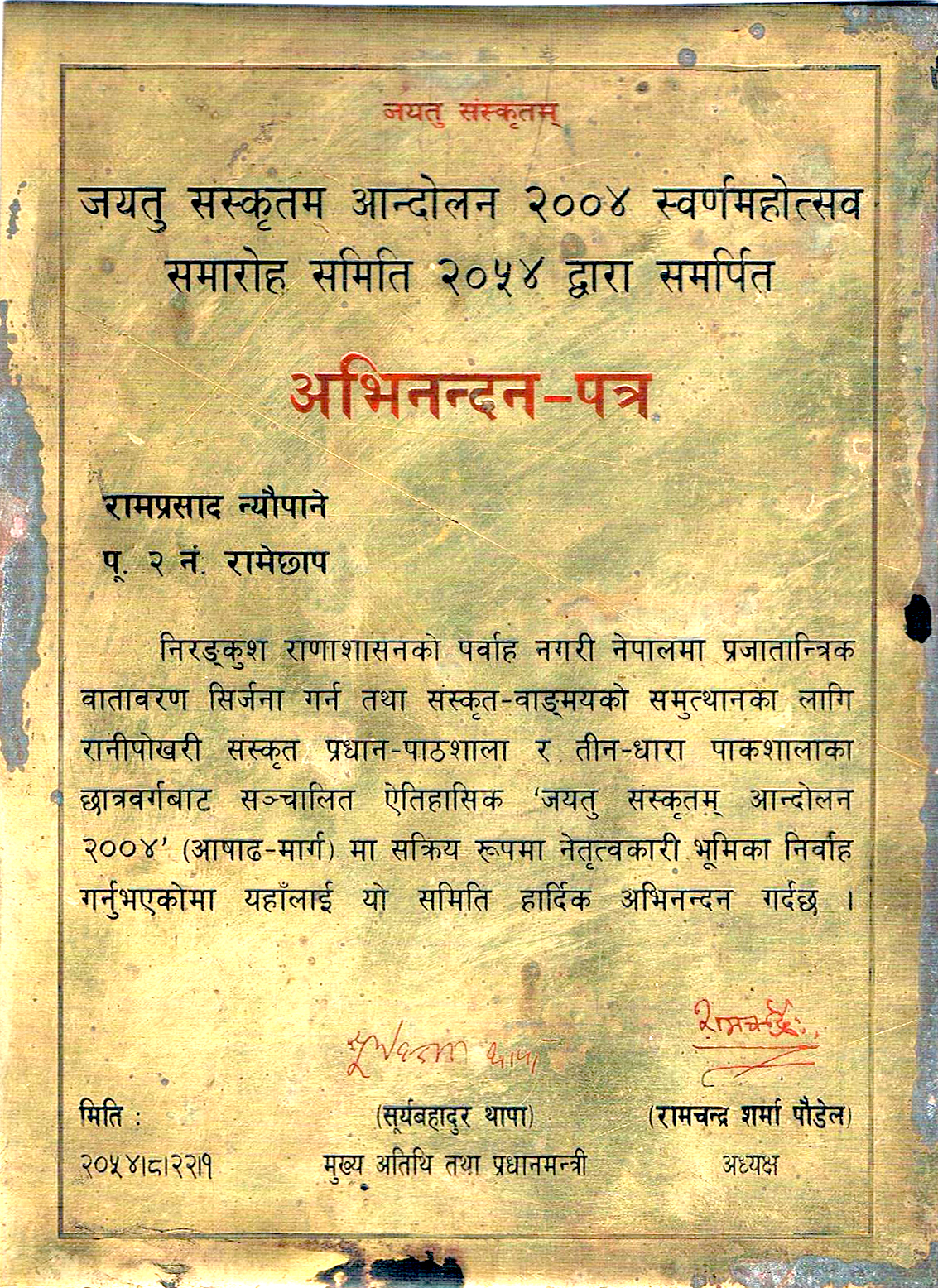
One of the leaders of the Jayatu Sanskritam student movement Pandit Ram Prasad Neupane receiving felicitation for his work towards bring democracy in Nepal.

The Jayatu Sanskritam dissent was considered the most significant and the first student dissents of Nepal. The students from Rajakiya Sanskrit Vidyalaya agitated against the policy of contemporary government. The role of the students was to create awareness among the people and to spread political consciousness as the beginning of democracy.

The leaders of Jayatu Sanskritam included:

- Ram Prasad Neupane (from Ramechhap)
- Kashinath Gautam
- Sribhadra Sharma Khanal (from Tanahun)
- Parasuram Pokhrel
- Purna Prasad Brahman
- Kamal Raj Regmi
- Rajeshwor Devkota
- Gokarna Shastri
- Rajesh Sahani (from Kapilvastu 8)
- Nageshwar Nagbansi (from Kapilvastu 7)
- Anil Gaud

=== The development process of student union ===
The history of the developing process of student union suggests us that students have been presenting their persuasive nature since 2006. In India, Mahatma Gandhi was agitating against the English government . B.P. Koirala in his very young age of 11 years was also involved in the movement under the leadership of Mahatma Gandhi.

At the age of 15, B.P. Koirala was confined because he was fighting for the emancipation of Nepali people from the Rana reign. He was the President of Congress Socialist Party of boys section. And Ganesh Man Singh was expelled from Durbar High School; Krishna Prasad Bhattarai was the Vice President of "Nepal Chatra Sangh", the union of Nepali Students in Banarash.

Students were the representatives who exploded the revolution against the tyrannical system of Rana rein. In that context, in BS 1997, magh 16, the student leader of Tri-Chandra College, Ganga Lal Shrestha was killed by hanging on a tree in Shova Bhagawati. So, he is called first martyr of the student union.

=== The Establishment of Nepal Pupil Union (Nepal Chhatra Sangh) ===
The ebb and flow of freedom in India had its influence on democracy in Nepal. As a result, the heart of puppet government of Ranas' started trembling. In spite of the excessive suppression by Rana, a few energetic youths gathered in Kupondole and organized a debating club under the chairperson-ship of Ganesh Bahadur Gurung and the other members of that committee were Basu Rimal, Surendra Raj Sharma, Gobind Lohani, Mrigendra Raj Pandey, Tej Bahadur prasai, Puskarnath Upadhaya, Krishna Babu etc. All the students were being prepared to rebel against the Rana Rein. And the debating club after while changed into Nepal Pupil Union during 2025 BS.

=== Nepal National Students Federation ===
Nepal N.S.P. is one of the students unions of Nepal established before 2007, Fagun, 7. Later the students who believed on leftist ideology had felt another student association as a result Nepal National Student Federation was born. It became active against the Rana rein.

=== Nepal Youth Party (Nepal Tarun Dal) ===
Nepal Youth Party (Nepal Tarun Dal) was established as a socialist party on 10th Kartik 2010 B.S. The purpose of union or party was to aware the pessimist youths living in different parts of Nepal. The union got the unexpected support and belief from the energetic and politically conscious youths of the then period. The slogan was recited by the youths "Samajbad Jindabad" which was skyscraping all over the country. As a result, in many parts of country the branches of this organization began to be organized. It created a kind of optimism over the youths.

=== The Dissent of Free Student Union ===
On the first push in 2017, military event binod jayswal had totally obstructed the all parties except the student unions. The students leaders of Nepal Pupil Union (Nepali Congress Supporters) and Nepal Youth Party were constrained. This badly affected the leaders and cadres of other student unions. This led to other allied parties becoming passive, including the Nepal Sanskrit Student Union. The Nepal National Student Federation and other leftist student unions had been already involved in Panchyati System. In the initial period of Panchayati system, the people could not raise their voice against the Panchyati Suppression, and it had declared the total prohibition over the all student union. In 2017, the students were agitating the movement of King Mahendra. The student leaders were Binod Jayswal, Marshal Julum Shakya and so on.

=== Nepal Pupil and Youth Organization ===
The joint organization between Nepal pupil and youth union had a significant role as it was managed by the migrated Nepali Students in Darbhanga India. They were trying to collect India's support to establish democracy in Nepal. The leaders of the Union were C.K. Prasai, President, Maheshwor Singh, the General Secretary and others are Shiva Chand Jha, Arbinda Thakur and so on.

=== Assembly of Intra High School ===
In spite of the excessive obstruction by the Panchayati government, the rebellious students had never left their ethics of revolution. The political parties in which ethics and belief, the students were concerned, were directly or indirectly opposing the Panchayati tyrants. Although the great suppression of that system had badly affected the students movement but the students were never tired agitating them. Even the students of high school level were encouraged to have been participated in the movement of anti-Panchayati system. During the course of this movement, students had taken a risk and they organized an assembly of 22 high school's student in 2019 to aware the people about democracy. The students of college or campus were also agitating the Panchayati government. The assembly is still regarded as one of the historical movement in the entire history of Nepalese politics.

=== The Protest of University Students ===
After having the right to organize the union, the first student's Protest was held on 22 Baisakh, 2020. On Baisakh 19, 2020 the then principal of university Surya Bahadur Sakya had punished the students Dambar Biru, the student of English department TU and Shree Bhakta Gobinda Shrestha as a result, the students agitated against his punishment. In the process of that Protest, an action committee was formed under the chairmanship of Nava Raj Subedi.

=== Intra College Students Assembly ===
Before 2007 B.S., there was only one college in Nepal which was Tri-Chandra College. In Tri-Chandra College only the arts education was available - those students who were interested to study science in further level had to go to India. After 2007 BS, or after the democracy, there was a mushroom growth of school in Nepal. As a result, average people could get education in Nepal relatively easily. Till the military evidence there were 29 colleges in Nepal, there was not the favorable environment for the uplifting of university education.

There was lack of furniture, infrastructure, and other facilities although Tribhuvan University had already been established. The first vice chancellor Mr. Subarna Samser Rana had formed the educational activities dynamically to uplift the educational qualities. He had also developed the technical and physical aspect of Tribhuvan University. Due to the military evidence of 2017, the educational activities were obstructed. The students hardly succeeded to organize the student unions to solve the class problems. The students were deprived of organizing the student unions till 2019.

In spite of many challenges and obstacles the students were able to form the union in 2019 B.S. The first president of the Student Union was Nawaraj Subedi. Subedi not only did works against the students' sprit but also showed his moral support to the Panchayati government. As a result, students got him to quit from the committee and selected Daman Nath Dhungana as an acting president.

The election of Tribhuvan University had organized the second union. There are so many unions among the inter colleges of TU in Nepal. The student organizations of intra valley college had decided to have assembly from 25 to 29 Baisakh 2021. The students of Tri-Chandra College had hung the banners at the fence of Rani Pokhari in which 'Intra College Assembly' was written. The assembly was held in Trichandra college at Saraswati Sadan. It was a symbol of students' courage to appear before the tyrannical government.

=== The Preparation of First General Assembly ===
There was no change in the exploiting nature of Panchyati tyrannical government over the democratic forces. The students were going to be more energetic and rebellious against it. The government was being fully restless. The victory of the democratic candidates on the election of union in Tribhuvan University was considered as the first attempt of democracy.

== Contemporary challenges ==
Nepal Student Union has faced persistent organisational challenges, particularly delays in holding its general conventions and internal factional disputes. Reports indicate that internal disagreements within the Nepali Congress have repeatedly postponed conventions and affected the functioning of the youth wing.

In recent years, the party leadership has formed committees to oversee and expedite delayed conventions of its sister organisations, including Nepal Tarun Dal.
