= Ram Hari Khatiwada =

Nepalese politician

Honourable Ram Hari Khatiwada
- राम हरि खतिवडा

Member of Parliament, House of Representatvies
- In office 22 December 2022 – 12 September 2025
- Constituency: Okhaldhunga 1

Joint General Secretary of the Nepali Congress
- Incumbent
- Assumed office 29 October 2026
- President: Gagan Thapa

Personal details
- Born: 8 January 1970 (age 56) Okhaldhunga District
- Party: Nepali Congress
- Parent: Jibnath Khatiwada (father)
- Education: Tribhuwan University

Ram Hari Khatiwada is a Nepalese politician, serving as the Joint General Secretary of the Nepali Congress party. He also served as a member of the 2nd Federal Parliament of Nepal. In the 2022 Nepalese general election, he won the election from Okhaldhunga 1 (constituency).
