= Jayatu Sanskritam =

Protest

Jayatu Sanskritam movement
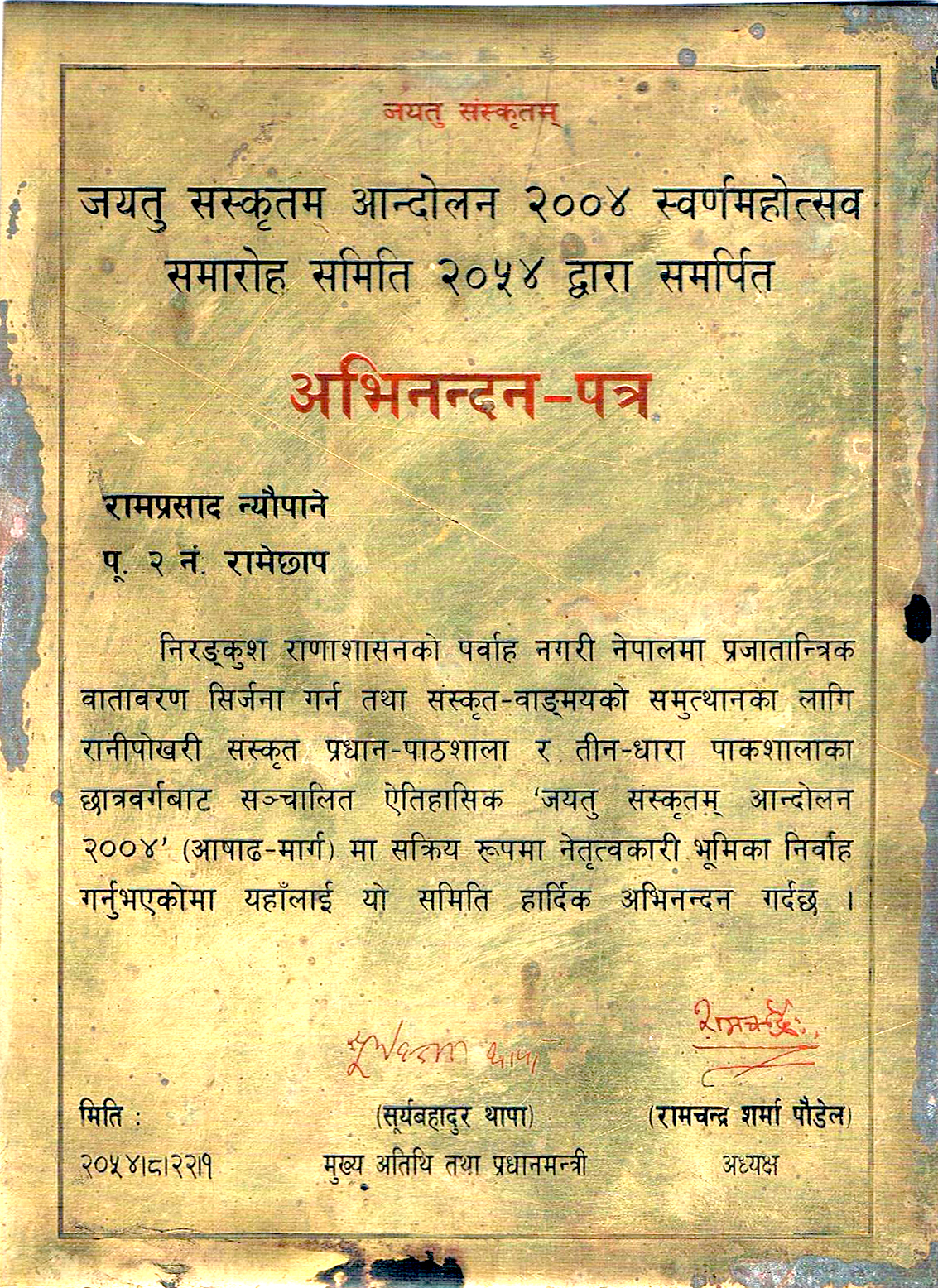
- One of the leaders of the Jayatu Sanskritam student movement, Pandit Ram Prasad Neupane, received felicitation for his work towards bringing democracy in Nepal.
- Date: 1–15 June 1947
- Location: Nepal

Parties
(Kingdom of Nepal) Rana dynasty	Tin Dhara Pakshala

Lead figures
(Kingdom of Nepal) Padma Shumsher Jang Bahadur Rana	Ram Prasad Neupane

The Jayatu Sanskritam movement begin in 1947 AD(BS 2004), started by students of the Tin Dhara Pakshala Sanskrit School in Nepal. They demanded democracy, basic welfare, and the inclusion of modern subjects in their curriculum. It was the first student uprising in Nepal's history, and led to the Revolution of 1951 and the fall of the Rana dynasty.

Started by students of the Tin Dhara Pakshala hostel, and later also included students at a Rajkiya Sanskrit Vidyalaya school near the Ranipokhari; the protests centred around restrictions on education, as the only subject allowed in the Sanskrit schools was the study of Sanskrit. This contrasted with the wider educational opportunities and higher status of students related to the ruling Rana clan.

The protestors became known for the slogan they would call, jayatu Sanskritam ("victory to the cause of Sanskrit").

On 1 June 1947, the students submitted a written demand to Prime Minister Padma Shumsher requesting courses in geography, history, economics and political science. When the government ignored their demands, the students went on strike. The students continued to agitate for educational and social equality, including waving anti-Rana flags in protest. The strike lasted until 15 June, when the government agreed to expand the curriculum offered to the students. Although the protests were placated by promises from Prime Minister Padma Shumsher Jang Bahadur Rana, his military commander-in-chief Mohan Shumsher Jang Bahadur Rana ordered arrests and imprisonments, and forcefully deported forty-two students, who were identified as leaders of the movement. From India, many of these exiles joined Bishweshwar Prasad Koirala and others agitating for the establishment of democracy in Nepal, which led to the 1951 revolution and the overthrow of the regime.

== Leaders of the movement ==
Ram Prasad Neupane was born in the Ramechhap District of Nepal. He studied Sanskrit in Sanskrit Pradhan, Paathsaala, Ranipokhari and stayed at the Tin Dhara Paakshala hostel in Durbar Marg, Kathmandu, Nepal. He was exiled with other leaders for protesting against the Rana regime.

Other leaders included:

- Rajeshwor Devkota
- Kashinath Gautam
- Sribhadra Sharma Khanal (from Tanahun)
- Parasuram Pokhrel
- Purna Prasad Brahman
- Kamal Raj Regmi
- Ganga Prasad Sharma
- Gokarna Shastri
