= Nepal Tarun Dal =

Youth wing of the Nepali Congress Party

- नेपाल तरुण दल
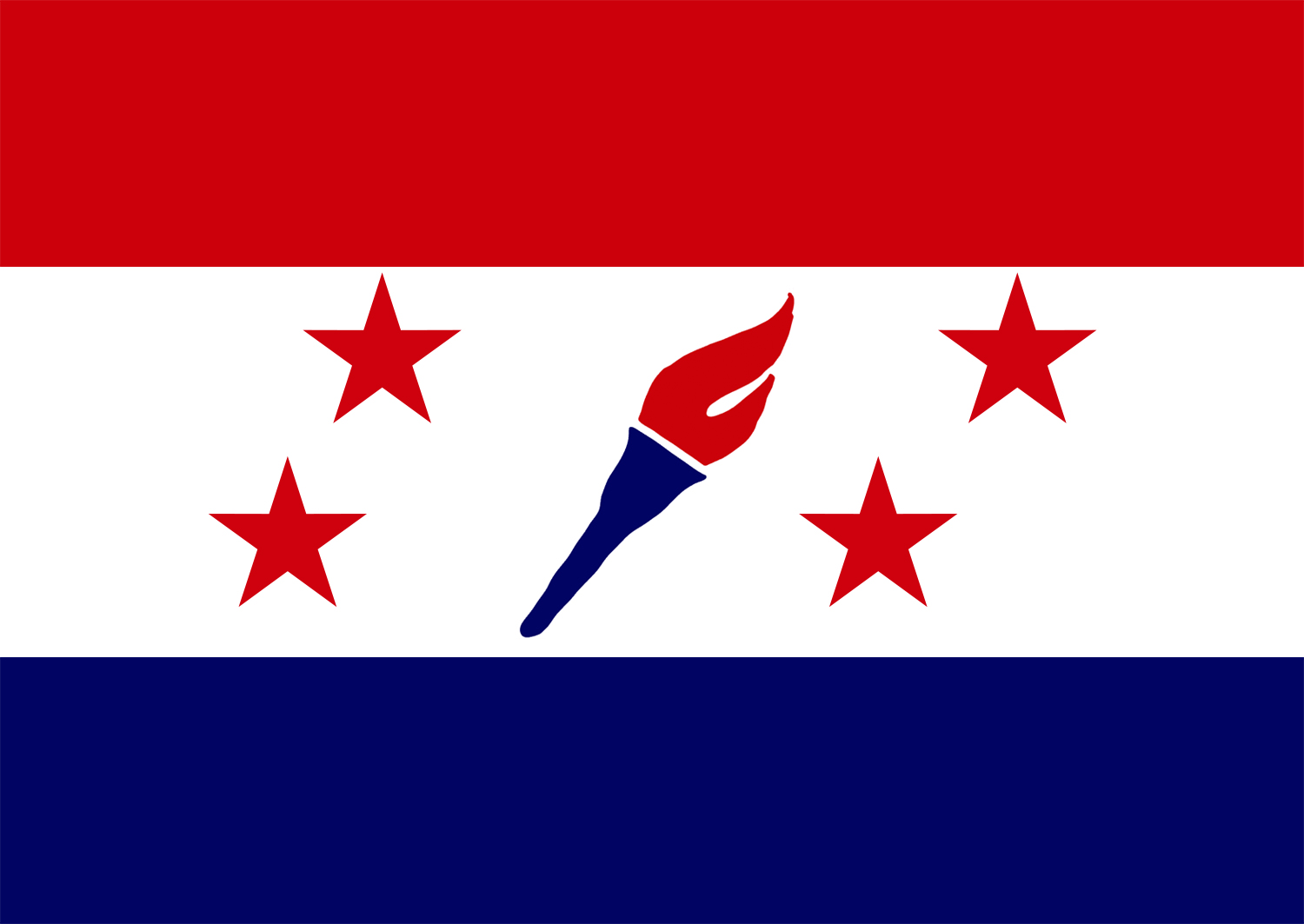
- Nepal Tarun Dal Flag
- Abbreviation: NTD
- Founded: 26 October 1953; 73 years ago
- Founders: B. P. Koirala; Singha Dhwaj Khadka
- Type: Youth wing
- Legal status: Active
- Purpose: Democratic socialism Youth rights
- Headquarters: Kathmandu, Nepal
- Founder President: Singha Dhwaj Khadka
- President: Manish Koirala
- Parent organisation: Nepali Congress
- Affiliations: International Union of Socialist Youth
- Website: www.nepaltarundal.org.np

Nepal Tarun Dal (Nepali: नेपाल तरुण दल) is the youth wing of the Nepali Congress, founded on 10 Kartik 2010 B.S. (1953 A.D.) under the inspiration of Bishweshwar Prasad Koirala. The organisation promotes the party's principles of nationalism, democracy, and socialism and mobilises youth across Nepal.

== History ==
=== Early years and Panchayat era ===
Following the 1960 Nepalese royal coup, King Mahendra of Nepal dissolved parliament and banned political parties, forcing the Nepali Congress and its affiliated organisations to operate underground during the Panchayat system.

As part of this political crackdown, Nepal Tarun Dal was also banned and its organisational structure effectively dismantled. The organisation ceased to function as a formal entity and entered a prolonged period of inactivity. From 1960 until its revival in 1997, Nepal Tarun Dal remained largely dormant, with no formal institutional presence. During this period, youth associated with the Nepali Congress continued to participate in pro-democracy movements against the Panchayat system, though not under the banner of Nepal Tarun Dal.

=== Role in democratic movements ===
Nepal Tarun Dal has been associated with the Nepali Congress's pro-democracy struggles against the Panchayat system and monarchical rule.

During the 1990 People's Movement, activists affiliated with the Nepali Congress, including youth members, participated in mass protests that led King Birendra of Nepal to restore multiparty democracy. Similarly, during the 2006 People's Movement, party-affiliated youth activists took part in protests against King Gyanendra of Nepal's direct rule, contributing to the reinstatement of parliament and the eventual abolition of the monarchy.

The organisation has "played a significant role" in the party’s long struggle for democracy, nationalism and socialism.

== Organisation and activities ==
Nepal Tarun Dal operates through committees across Nepal and functions as the primary youth mobilisation wing of the Nepali Congress. The organisation has also been described as the "backbone" of the party during periods of political mobilisation, though this characterization is attributed to opinion writing.

== Ideology ==
Nepal Tarun Dal follows the principles of nationalism, democracy, and socialism as outlined by the Nepali Congress, with a focus on youth mobilisation, social justice, and democratic participation.

== Structure ==
The organisation operates under the Nepali Congress and maintains committees at central, district, and local levels across Nepal.

== Contemporary challenges ==
Nepal Tarun Dal has faced persistent organisational challenges, particularly delays in holding its general conventions and internal factional disputes. Reports indicate that internal disagreements within the Nepali Congress have repeatedly postponed conventions and affected the functioning of the youth wing.

In recent years, the party leadership has formed committees to oversee and expedite delayed conventions of its sister organisations, including Nepal Tarun Dal.

The organisation has also been criticised for aggressive conduct by some cadres. In one reported incident, Tarun Dal activists assaulted the Nepali Congress district president in Chitwan during an internal dispute.

In 2012, the Nepal Tarun Dal stated their belief that the election scheduled by the government was unconstitutional.

The organisation has also faced criticism over incidents involving violence and misconduct by some of its members. In 2014, 14 people were convicted in connection with the murder of Tarun Dal leader Shiva Poudel, with eight receiving life sentences.

In 2018, police arrested a Tarun Dal cadre on extortion charges in Kathmandu. In 2023, police also linked a Tarun Dal leader to a gold smuggling investigation. Another leader was arrested over a social media post targeting former Prime Minister Pushpa Kamal Dahal. In 2024, police arrested several Tarun Dal leaders and members in connection with an alleged assault incident in Kathmandu.

Internal disputes have at times turned violent during organisational events. In 2025, several people were injured during clashes at the Tarun Dal district convention in Lamjung following disagreements over delegate selection. In the same year, Tarun Dal members clashed with protesting students in Dhangadhi during demonstrations related to a local government bill.

=== Murder of Nabin Rana Magar ===
In 2013, the group stated that they believed that the death of Committee Member Nabin Rana Magar was murdered for political revenge. Nabin Rana Magar was found at the bottom of a cliff near Salleri VDC, and the subsequent investigation found that he had been murdered with a sharp weapon. Four people were arrested.

== Leadership ==
Nepal Tarun Dal has been led by various presidents, frequently through ad-hoc committees due to delays in holding general conventions.

=== Former Presidents ===
The following individuals have served as the president of Nepal Tarun Dal since its inception in 1953.

S.N.	President	Portrait	Period		Selection Method	Convention/Notes
1	Singha Dhwaj Khadka		1953	1960	Nominated	Founder President
From 1960 until its revival in 1997, Nepal Tarun Dal remained in a prolonged state of dormancy-functionally defunct, with no formal institutional presence.
2	Bal Krishna Khand		7 October 1997	25 September 2002	Appointed	Girija Prasad Koirala announced the revival of the Tarun Dal at the 2054 BS Nepalgunj convention, naming Bal Krishna Khand as its head.
2	Bal Krishna Khand		25 September 2002	2005	Office Retention	Parallel leadership after party split He aligned himself with NC Democratic following the split and continued as youth wing president
3	Mahadev Gurung		October 2002	4 April 2003	Appointed	Parallel leadership after party split Girija Prasad Koirala nominated Mahadev Gurung president, while the Tarun Dal official leadership Bal Krishna Khand aligned with the breakaway Nepali Congress (Democratic).
4	Binod Bahadur Kayastha		4 April 2003	November 2004	Appointed	Mahadev Gurung was removed as president by Girija Prasad Koirala, Binod Bahadur Kayastha was appointed in his place.
4	Binod Bahadur Kayastha		November 2004	24 September 2007	Elected	At the third convention of Nepal Tarun Dal held in Janakpur, Binod Kayastha was elected president with 169 votes, defeating Chandra Bhandari, who received 113 votes.
5	Mahendra Yadav		20 July 2007	25 September 2007	Elected	NC (Democratic) Tarun Dal 3rd General Convention (Chitwan); Parallel Committee
5	Mahendra Yadav		25 September 2007	20 September 2011	Appointed	Part of Merger agreement between NC and NC(D)
6	Udaya Shumsher Rana		5 February 2012	November 2016	Appointed	Ad-hoc committee
7	Jeet Jung Basnet		16 November 2016	March 2022	Consensus-elected	4th General Convention (Pokhara); Only four office-bearer positions settled by consensus among factions.
8	Bidhwan Gurung		23 March 2022	29 April 2026	Appointed	Ad-hoc committee; Resigned April 2026
9	Manish Koirala		24 May 2026	Incumbent	Appointed	Ad-hoc Committee; Nominated to oversee the 5th General Convention.
