= 2nd special convention of Nepali Congress =

2026 special internal election of Nepali Congress

- 11-12 January 2026
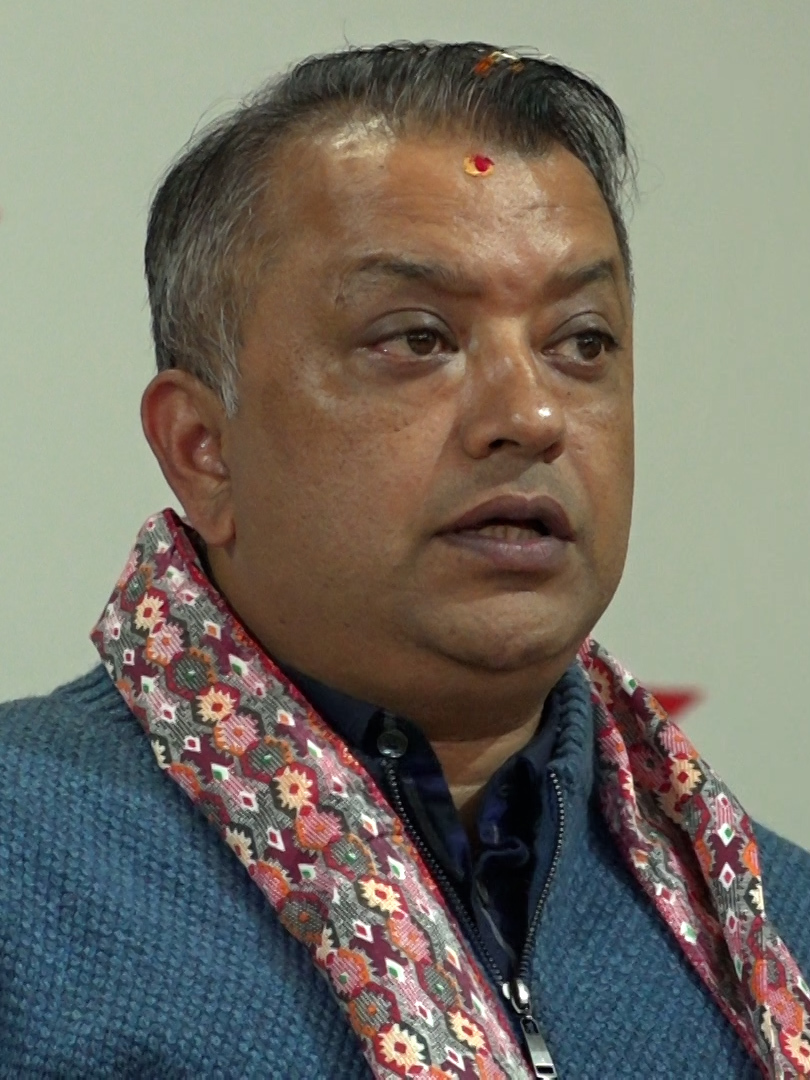
Candidate	Gagan Kumar Thapa
Percentage	(unopposed)
President before election
Sher Bahadur Deuba
Elected President
Gagan Thapa

Innagural session of special convention

The 2nd Special Convention of the Nepali Congress was a special convention of the Nepali Congress held on January 11–12, 2026 in Kathmandu. It was called due to major leadership disputes and over the timing of the party's 15th general convention and growing demands for leadership and organizational reforms within the party after the 2025 gen-z movement. The assembly elected Gagan Thapa as party president unopposed, along with new vice presidents and general secretaries.

Out of 4,743 registered voters from party's prior general convention, only 2,652 delegates physically registered and took part in the convention. The special convention was driven by a deep rift between the establishment faction (led by former Prime Minister Sher Bahadur Deuba) and a reformist youth camp (led by General Secretaries Gagan Thapa and Bishwa Prakash Sharma).

== Background ==
The Nepali Congress had been facing disagreements over the timing of its 15th general convention even before the September 2025 Gen Z protests. The party's 14th general convention was held in December 2021, and the next regular convention was due to be held within four years. By April 2025, however, preparations for the convention had fallen behind schedule, particularly over the renewal and verification of active party membership. General Secretary Gagan Thapa had called for the convention to be held by 2026, while the party leadership was considering a later date.

In July 2024, the Nepali Congress entered into a coalition with the Communist Party of Nepal (Unified Marxist–Leninist) to form a new government under the leadership of CPN (UML) chairman K. P. Sharma Oli, with an agreement to rotate the leadership between the two parties. The coalition government introduced a mandate to shut down social media for failing to register with the government which served as the trigger for the 2025 Gen Z protests. Following the death of 19 protestors as a result of the use of live ammunition, home minister Ramesh Lekhak from the party resigned, other ministers also resigned the next morning, but protestors vandalized the party headquarters and other local offices of the party across the country. Party president Sher Bahadur Deuba was assaulted at his residence along with his wife and foreign minister Arzu Rana Deuba. The houses of other leaders of the party were also vandalized and set ablaze. The government also resigned following the protests.

The events led to renewed calls within the Nepali Congress for organisational and leadership reform. Youth leaders including Gagan Thapa, Bishwa Prakash Sharma and Pradip Paudel led discussions within the party and proposed holding the general convention before the 2026 general election. A campaign was launched to collect signatures in support of a special general convention. Under Clause 17 of the party statute, a special general convention could be demanded if at least 40 percent of elected general convention representatives submitted signed requests. On 15 October 2025, 2,488 representatives, representing about 54 percent of the elected representatives, submitted a memorandum demanding a special convention, exceeding the required threshold.

Amidst such discussions, Sher Bahadur Deuba became first politician of any mainstream major party to hand over leadership assigning party vice president Purna Bahadur Khadka as acting president.

The dispute over the convention continued as the party attempted to organise its regular 15th general convention. The Central Working Committee decided in December 2025 to hold the regular convention from 10 to 12 January 2026, but preparations were affected by delays in the renewal and verification of active party membership. The party leadership subsequently postponed the regular convention to May 2026. Thapa and Sharma opposed the postponement and argued that the party needed to undergo leadership and organisational changes before the parliamentary election. They instead called for the special convention demanded by the party representatives to be held on 11–12 January 2026.

== Election timetable ==
Initially scheduled timetable for the 15th general convention:

Date	Events
15 December 2025	Last day for sending membership data to central office (For foreign committees)
18 December 2025	Last day for sending active membership data to central office
20 December 2025	Verification deadline of active membership by central
30 December 2025	Deadline for convention of foreign committees
31 December 2025	Ward level convention
1 January 2026	Municipal level convention
3 January 2026	Provincial constituency level election
5 January 2026	Federal constituency and district level convention (for districts with only one parliamentary constituency)
6 January 2026	District level convention (Districts with multiple parliamentary constituency)
7 - 8 January 2026	Provincial level convention
10 - 12 January 2026	Federal level convention

As the CWC of the party postponed the 15th general convention, a special convention was held on 11–12 January 2026.

== See also ==
- Nepali Congress
- 14th general convention of Nepali Congress
- 15th general convention of Nepali Congress
