= Gagan Thapa =

Nepali politician (born 1976)

- गगन थापा
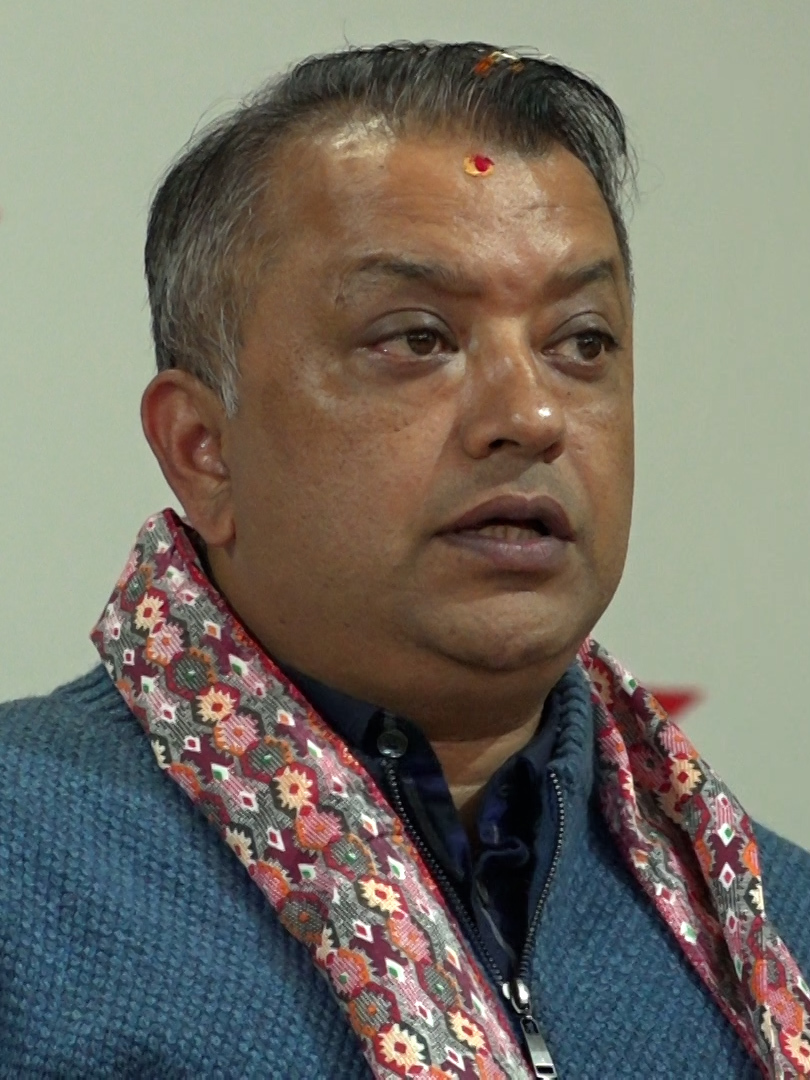

Minister of Health
- In office 25 August 2016 – 31 May 2017
- Prime Minister: Pushpa Kamal Dahal
- Preceded by: Ram Janam Chaudhary
- Succeeded by: Giriraj Mani Pokharel

President of the Nepali Congress
- Incumbent
- Assumed office 16 January 2026
- Deputy: Bishwa Prakash Sharma
- Preceded by: Sher Bahadur Deuba

General Secretary of the Nepali Congress
- In office 16 December 2021 – 14 January 2026 Serving with Bishwa Prakash Sharma
- Preceded by: Shashanka Koirala
- Succeeded by: Pradip Paudel; Gururaj Ghimire

Member of the House of Representatives
- In office 4 March 2018 – 12 September 2025
- Preceded by: Himself (as MCA)
- Succeeded by: Pukar Bam (elect)
- Constituency: Kathmandu 4

Member of the Constituent Assembly / Legislature Parliament
- In office 21 January 2014 – 14 October 2017
- Preceded by: Suprabha Ghimire
- Succeeded by: Himself (as MP)
- Constituency: Kathmandu 4
- In office 28 May 2008 – 28 May 2012
- Constituency: Party list (Nepali Congress)

Personal details
- Born: Gagan Kumar Thapa; 16 July 1976 (age 50) Solukhumbu District, Nepal
- Citizenship: Nepalese
- Party: Nepali Congress
- Spouse: Anjana KC Thapa (m. 2008)
- Children: 2
- Relatives: Arjun Narasingha K.C. (father-in-law)

Gagan Kumar Thapa (Note: Nepali: गगन कुमार थापा) (born 19 July 1976) is a Nepali politician serving as the president of the Nepali Congress since 2026. He was the prime ministerial candidate for the Nepali Congress in the 2026 general election.

Thapa is a four-time parliamentarian, having first been elected via proportional representation in 2008, and since 2013 has been elected from Kathmandu 4. He served as Minister of Health from August 2016 to May 2017, when he initiated health insurance and other widely popular facilities.

== Early life and education ==
Gagan Kumar Thapa was born on16 July 1976 in Solukhumbu district of Nepal. He was raised in a conservative middle-class family and graduated from Siddhartha Vanasthali School in 1992. He completed his Bachelors of Science in chemistry from Tri Chandra College in 1998 and M.A. in sociology from Tribhuvan University in 2003.

== Political life ==
=== Student leader and democracy activist ===
Thapa was the president of the Free Student Union of Tri Chandra College from 1998 to 2000. He was a Committee Member of the Nepal Students Union from 1998 to 2002, Vice President from 2000 to 2002, and its General Secretary from 2002 to 2004.

After the dissolution of Parliament and declaration of emergency by King Gyanendra, Thapa took a strong stand against the royal regime and called for the establishment of a republic. He called for greater involvement of youth in the movement, and called on students to take to the streets to launch a decisive movement for the restoration of democracy. He was jailed on charges of sedition in 2004. On 26 April 2005, he and two other NSU activists were arrested but released on 5 May after the Supreme Court deemed their detention illegal. Thapa was immediately rearrested and served with a 90-day detention order under the Public Security Act (PSA). He was declared a Prisoner of Conscience by Amnesty International. Following a Special Court order in July 2005, Thapa was arrested from the Singha Durbar Ward Police Station where he had gone to meet his colleagues, and was subsequently interrogated by The Office of the Kathmandu District Government Attorney for his involvement in 'offense against the state' by chanting anti-monarchy slogans at a rally. Following immense international pressure, Thapa was released in August 2005.

The same month, Thapa announced his candidacy for the President of the Nepal Student Union (NSU), the student wing of the Nepal Congress Party (NC). Thapa was excluded from the race by Nepal Congress Party President, Girija Prasad Koirala, on charges of being 'agents of the palace' alongside NC Central Member Narhari Acharya. During the 10th General Convention of the NSU in Pokhara, there were fights between the Koirala faction and the Thapa faction. Thapa accused the party leadership of preventing the closed-door session from being held to forestall adoption of a pro-republican agenda

In January 2006, Thapa urged the youth to boycott the municipal polls. The democracy movement succeeded in April. In May, he called for leaders of political parties to make public their personal property. Thapa was seen as an advocate of peaceful protests. On 2 July 2006, Thapa in an interview with BBC News on the fifth anniversary of Nepalese royal massacre asserted that "..The Nepalese have begun writing a new autobiography for Nepal, an autobiography with a vision, philosophy and an ideology; a distinct autobiography with socio-economic and cultural harmony and prosperity; an autobiography displaying the life and history of the common men and women of Nepal." He also continued advocate for the abolition of monarchy throughout 2006. During the 12th National Convention of the NSU in 2007, Thapa pulled out his candidacy for the post of President, claiming that "The NC leadership has remained biased against me and therefore I have declared that I would not contest".

=== Member of Constituent Assembly (2008 – 2013) ===
Gagan Thapa was elected to the First Constituent Assembly (CA) under the party-list proportional representation system from Nepali Congress.

Thapa won a seat in the Central Working Committee of Nepali Congress in the 12th National Convention held in 2010, receiving the highest number of votes.

=== Member of Legislature Parliament (2013 – 2017) ===
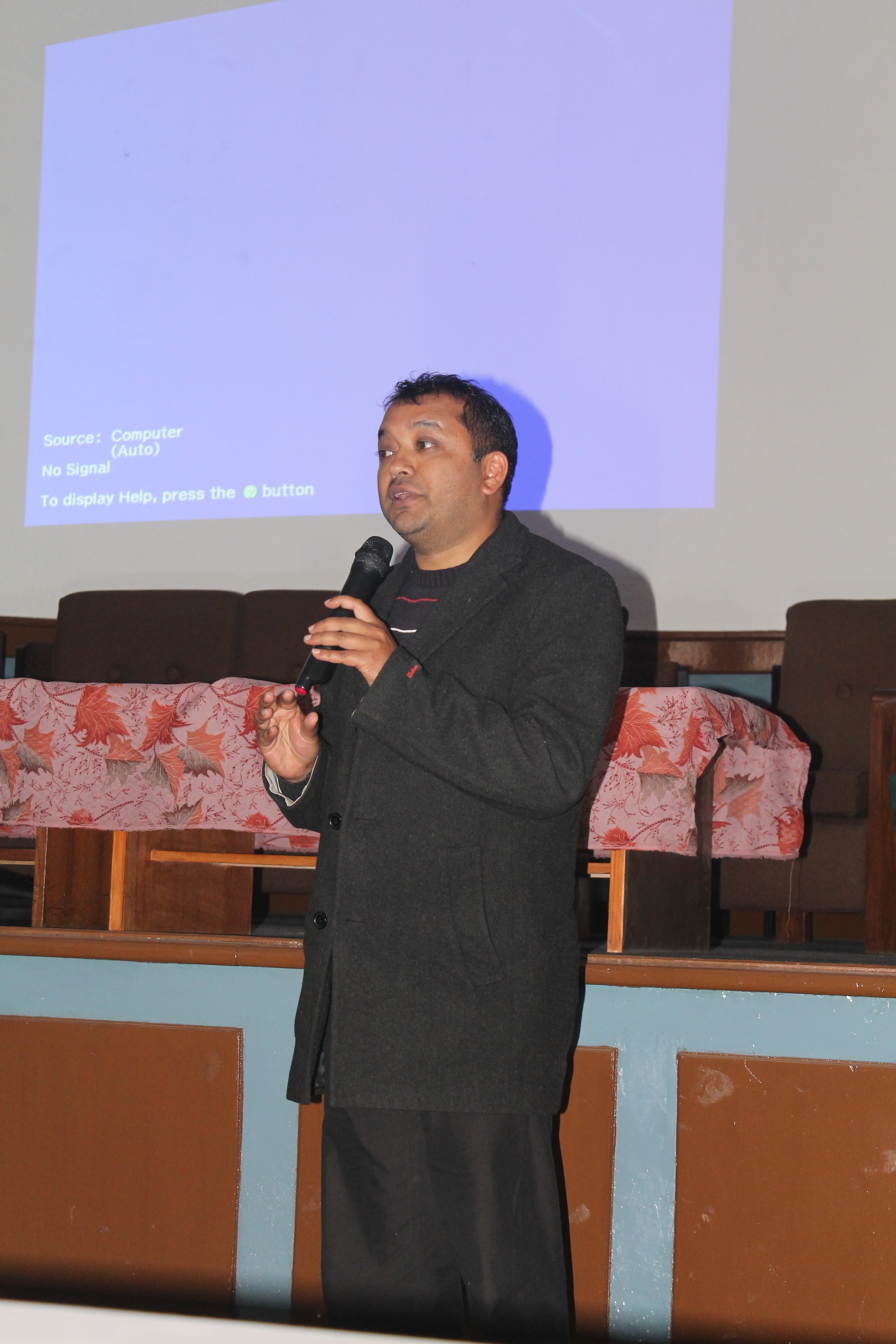
Thapa at Open Data Day 2014 giving speech on Open Data and policy making in Nepal

Thapa was elected as a Member of Parliament of the Second Constituent Assembly following election in November 2013, following the failure of the first CA. Thapa won from Kathmandu-4 with 22,336 votes against candidates Nirmal Kuikel of CPN (UML) (9,028 votes) and Nanda Kishor Pun (Pashang) of the UCPN Maoists (6,462 votes). He was also chairman of the Agriculture and Water Resources Committee. He urged for the formation of a commission to settle issues of provincial boundaries with the mandate to demarcate provincial boundaries quickly, adding that the new constitution should be promulgated without finalizing the boundaries of proposed provinces. Thapa also pushed the government to address the Madhes agitation by addressing the demands of Madhes, further blaming the government for promoting black marketing in the face of the 2015 Nepal Blockade and the Terai unrest, right after the 2015 Earthquake. He condemned the blockade imposed by India, terming it "an inhuman move". In December 2013, Thapa endorsed the campaign "No Thanks, I Carry My Own Bag".

==== Livable Kathmandu Campaign ====
Thapa started the Livable Kathmandu Campaign, which was an effort towards the sustainable development of the Kathmandu Valley.

=== Minister of Health (2016 – 2017) ===
On 26 August 2016, Thapa was sworn into office as the Minister for Health by President Bidhya Devi Bhandari.

=== Member of Parliament (2017 – Present) ===
Thapa was elected as a Member of Parliament in the 2017 Nepalese Legislative Election in December 2017 from Kathmandu-4 for the second time consecutively. He is a member of the Parliamentary Committee on Education and Health.

While campaigning during the election, Thapa along with 10 others was injured when an IED exploded at Chapali Height in Kathmandu. Thapa suffered minor injuries to his head and back in the explosion. There was a lot of outrage, both from Nepali Congress leaders as well leaders of opposition and other parties, directed at the government following the government's inability to figure out the perpetrators, given that Thapa's party was in majority control of the government at the time.

Thapa was critical of the Information Technology Bill on grounds of it "curtailing the fundamental rights of people to freedom of expression and opinion, and was hence against the spirit of the constitution." On 29 November 2018, Thapa had called for a civil disobedience against the 4 day odd-even traffic rule issued to manage the Asia Pacific Summit 2018 by the government. Thapa commented that the organization had a controversial history of accusations of mass proselytism as well as the illegal promotion of Christianity and the public should not suffer for such an unjust cause.

=== Intraparty politics ===
==== Bid for general secretary ====
In March 2016, Thapa unsuccessfully contested for the post of the Nepali Congress Party's general secretary, competing against Arjun Narasingha KC and Shashanka Koirala. He was the only candidate who represented the youth among the 10 aspirants of office bearer positions in the country's oldest and largest political party. As a Central Committee Member, Thapa has called for a change in the Nepali Congress's leadership through a special party convention. Thapa also lead the party's central publicity and communication committee for the federal and provincial elections. Thapa was one of the candidates for the post of General Secretary in the 14th general convention of Nepali Congress and was elected with highest popular votes.

==== Party reformation and party presidency ====
Thapa has long expressed his desire for party reformation and has worked to that end for more than a decade, calling for the replacement of the general and active membership in 2015 He was kicked from Nepali Congress on 14 January 2026 for not following party rules and regulations. Later he was elected as president and prime minister candidate of party from the 2nd special convention of Nepali Congress which was recognized by election commission later. Thapa was re-elected as a president of the party in the 15th general convention which was held in Kathmandu from 4 to 8 October, 2026.

== Personal life ==
In 2008, Thapa was married to Anjana KC, daughter of Arjun Narsingh KC.

== Electoral history ==
Election	House	Constituency	Party	Votes	Opponent	Party	Votes	Result
2013	Constituent Assembly (Legislature Parliament)	Kathmandu 4	Nepali Congress	22,336	Nirmal Kuikel	CPN (UML)	9,135	Elected
2017	House of Representatives (Federal Parliament)	Kathmandu 4	Nepali Congress	21,558	Rajan Bhattarai	CPN (UML)	18,140	Elected
2022	House of Representatives (Federal Parliament)	Kathmandu 4	Nepali Congress	21,302	Rajan Bhattarai	CPN (UML)	13,855	Elected
2026	House of Representatives (Federal Parliament)	Sarlahi 4	Nepali Congress	22,831	Amresh Kumar Singh	Rastriya Swatantra Party	35,688	Defeated

== See also ==
- 2nd special convention of Nepali Congress
