= 11th general convention of Nepali Congress =

2005 party convention of the Nepali Congress held in Kathmandu

11th General Convention of the Nepali Congress was held in Kathmandu, Nepal, from 30 August to 2 September 2005. The convention took place in the aftermath of the royal takeover of 1 February 2005. The convention became a pivotal moment in the party’s shift away from support for constitutional monarchy towards republicanism.

== Background ==
On 1 February 2005, King Gyanendra dismissed the government, curtailed civil liberties, and assumed direct rule. In this context, the Nepali Congress (NC) indefinitely postponed its previously scheduled March 2005 general convention. The convention took place in Kathmandu from 30 August to 2 September 2005. Contemporary reporting described preparations and the agenda leading into the four-day meeting in the capital.

=== Proceedings and resolutions ===
During the convention, the NC approved an amendment removing references to "constitutional monarchy" from its statute, signalling a major programmatic shift away from monarchy. The convention re-elected Girija Prasad Koirala as party president.

The 2005 decisions reshaped NC’s platform and helped align mainstream parties on a republican trajectory during the run-up to the 2006 democracy movement (Jana Andolan II). In September 2007, NC formally endorsed a republican framework, approving a resolution to declare Nepal a republic during the constitutional transition. The monarchy was abolished by the Constituent Assembly on 28 May 2008.

== See also ==
- Nepali Congress
- 2006 democracy movement in Nepal
- 10th general convention of Nepali Congress
- 12th general convention of Nepali Congress
