= Pushpa Bhusal Gautam =

Nepali politician

Pushpa Bhusal (Gautam)
- पुष्पा भुसाल (गौतम)

Vice President, Nepali Congress
- Incumbent
- Assumed office 29 October 2026 Serving with Madhu Prasad Acharya, Chandra Bhandari, Binod Chaudhary
- President: Gagan Thapa
- In office 14 January 2026 – 29 October 2026 Serving with Bishwa Prakash Sharma
- President: Gagan Thapa
- Preceded by: Purna Bahadur Khadka; Dhanraj Gurung

Deputy Speaker of the House of Representatives of Nepal
- In office 15 July 2022 – 25 September 2022
- President: Bidhya Devi Bhandari
- Speaker: Agni Prasad Sapkota
- Preceded by: Shiva Maya Tumbahamphe
- Succeeded by: Indira Ranamagar

Member of Parliament, House of Representatives for Nepali Congress party list
- In office 4 March 2018 – 25 September 2022

Member of Constituent Assembly
- In office 28 May 2008 – 28 May 2012
- Preceded by: Dilli Raj Khanal
- Succeeded by: Duman Singh Thapa
- Constituency: Arghakhanchi 2

Personal details
- Born: 12 February 1961 (age 65) Arghakhanchi, Nepal
- Party: Nepali Congress
- Parent(s): Kashi Nath Gautam (father); Sharada Gautam (mother)

Pushpa Bhusal Gautam is a Nepali advocate and politician. She served as deputy speaker of the House of Representatives of the Federal Parliament of Nepal. She is currently serving as the Vice President of Nepali Congress.

== Early life and education ==
Pushpa Bhusal Gautam was born on 12 February 1961 in Arghakhanchi District of Nepal. Her father Kashi Nath Gautam was the health minister of Nepal in 1959. After the royal coup by King Mahendra in 1960 her family lived in exile in India for 13 years.

Gautam holds a Bachelors of Law degree and Masters degree in Political Science.

== Career and political history ==
Gautam joined politics in 1971 through Nepal's Student Union, student wing of Nepali Congress. She later held the position of General Secratry in Nepal Woman Association. She is a legal profession/advocate from 1974. From 1989, Bhusal worked for 10 years as associate professor in Tribhuvan University during which she taught in Ratna Rajya Laxmi Campus. She has also worked as an advisior for various national and international organizations related to woman's right.

She was elected as the Central Working Committee Member of Nepali Congress in 12th general convention of the party for the first time and was re-elected in 13th and 14th convention. She was a election candidate from Arghakhanchi in 1999 election but was defeated.

Bhusal served as a member of constitution-drafting committee that drafted the Interim Constitution of Nepal in 2007.

Gautam was directly elected as member of the 1st constituent assembly in 2008 from Constituent assembly election. She was also a member of the constitution drafting committee of the constituent assembly. She was a candidate in 2013 Constituent Assembly Election but was defeated. She was then elected a member of parliament in 2017 through proportional representation system from Nepali Congress. She served as the whip of the party in 5th house of representatives before getting elected as a Deputy Speaker of the House of Representatives in 15 July 2022.

She was the candidate from Nepali Congress for 2022 general election but was again defeated.

Bhusal was elected as the Vice President of the Nepali Congress party in 2nd special convention of the party and was re-elected in the 15th general convention of the party in October 2026.
