= Jhabilal Dumre =

Nepalese politician

Honourable Jhabilal Dumre
- झविलाल डुम्रे

Member of Parliament, Pratinidhi Sabha
- Incumbent
- Assumed office 26 March 2026
- Preceded by: Dhanraj Gurung
- Constituency: Syangja 2

Personal details
- Born: 21 July 1992 (age 34) Waling, Syangja, Nepal
- Citizenship: Nepalese
- Party: Rastriya Swatantra Party (2022 – present)
- Parents: Tejlal Dumre (father); Parbata Dumre (mother)
- Profession: Politician; Entrepreneur

Jhabilal Dumre (Nepali: झविलाल डुम्रे) is a Nepalese politician and an entrepreneur. He currently serves as a member of parliament for the Rastriya Swatantra Party. He is a member of the 7th Pratinidhi Sabha, elected from the Syangja 2 constituency in the 2026 Nepalese General Election, securing 25,354 votes and defeating Bhagwat Prakash Malla of the Nepali Congress.

== Early and personal life ==
Dumre was born in Waling, Syangja on July 21, 1992. He was born to Tejlal Dumre and Prabata Dumre. He completed his primary education from Waling and pursued his higher education, a Master's degree in rural development.

== Politics ==
Dumre joined Rastriya Swatantra Party in 2022. After joining the RSP, his active political enthusiasm pushed the party to nominate him as a Proportional representation candidate in the 2022 Nepalese general election. Later he took the responsibility of a member of the party's central organization department. He secured a party ticket to contest the 2026 Nepalese general election from Syangja 2 and filed his candidacy nomination on January 20, 2026. The Syangja-2 parliamentary constituency is known as a stronghold of the Nepali Congress, as it won the last four general elections out of seven. Dumre secured 25,354 votes and defeated Bhagwat Prakash Malla of the Nepali Congress, who received 20,830 votes, while Khim Bahadur Thapa of the CPN (UML) obtained 14,108 and Nepali Communist Party's Padam Bahadur BK secured 848 votes.

== Electoral performance ==
Election	Year	Constituency	Contested for	Political party	Result	Votes	% of votes	Ref.
Nepal general election	2026	Syangja 2	Pratinidhi Sabha member	Rastriya Swatantra Party	Won	25,354	40.72%	
