= 10th general convention of Nepali Congress =

2001 internal election of Nepali Congress

10th General Convention of Nepali Congress
- 19–22 January 2001

Majority of valid delegate ballots
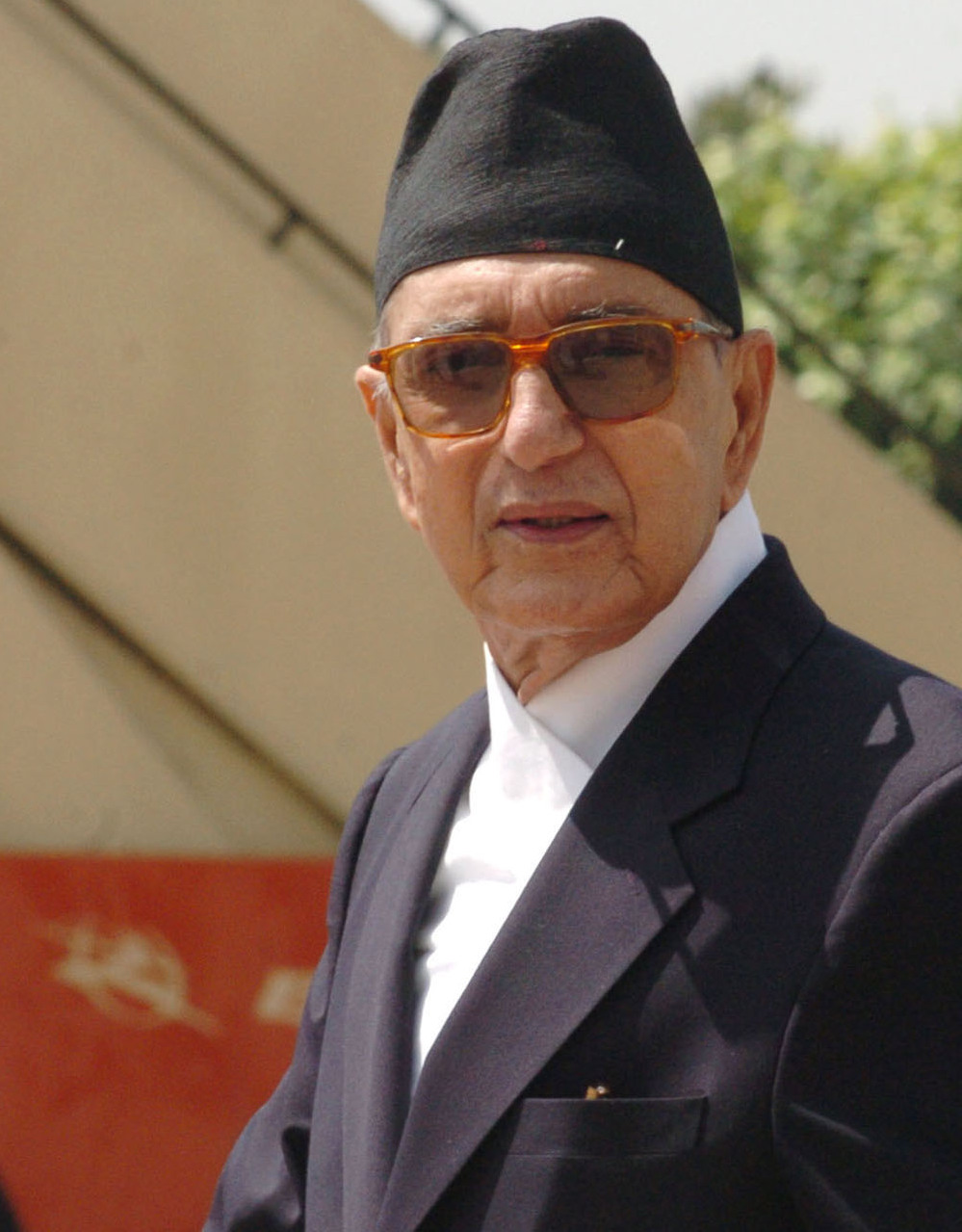

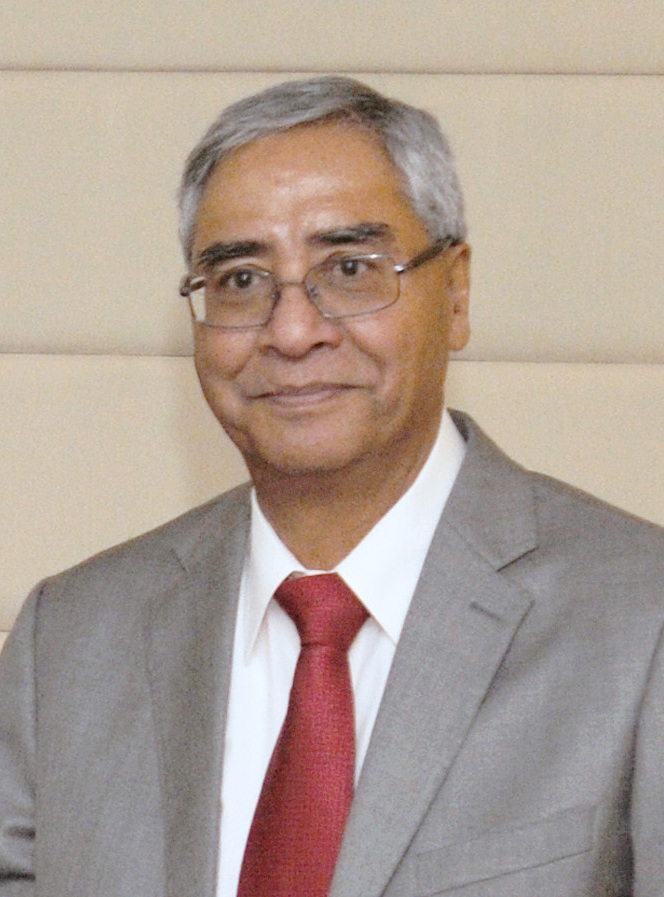
Candidate	Girija Prasad Koirala	Sher Bahadur Deuba
Vote	936 (64.4%)	507 (34.9%)
Leader before election
Girija Prasad Koirala
Elected Leader
Girija Prasad Koirala

The 10th General Convention of the Nepali Congress was held in Pokhara, Nepal, from 19 to 22 January 2001. The event was organized in the midst of severe political instability, parliamentary deadlock, the growing Maoist insurgency, and just months before the June 2001 royal palace massacre. Delegates at the convention discussed several critical matters, including economic policy responses, the Maoist insurgency, and law and order concerns.

== Leadership election ==
The convention re-elected incumbent party president and Prime Minister Girija Prasad Koirala for a second term. He won with 936 votes (64%) out of 1,453 valid ballots, defeating former prime minister Sher Bahadur Deuba (507 votes) and former minister Ram Hari Joshi (10 votes).

Candidate	Votes	%
Girija Prasad Koirala	936	64.4
Sher Bahadur Deuba	507	34.9
Total	1,453	100

== Central Working Committee elections ==
The convention also elected members of the party's Central Working Committee (CWC).

Candidate	Votes
Ram Chandra Paudel	1,015
Shailaja Acharya	898
Prakash Man Singh	850
Khum Bahadur Khadka	812
Parakeet Koirala	794
Mahesh Acharya	781
Sushil Koirala	776
Pradeep Giri	662
Narahari Acharya	653
Arjun Narasingha KC	652
Baldev Sharma Majgainya	593
Krishna Prasad Sitaula	586
Mahantha Thakur	583
Bala Bahadur Rai	580
Bijaya Kumar Gachhadar	575
Govind Raj Joshi	569
Bimalendra Nidhi	566
Chiranjibi Wagle	540
Total	1,453

=== Nominated members ===
Party president Koirala also nominated the following leaders to the CWC:

- Krishna Prasad Bhattarai
- Sher Bahadur Deuba
- Basu Risal
- Nona Koirala
- Dil Bahadur Gharti
- Ram Krishna Tamrakar
- Sunil Kumar Bhandari
- Farmullah Mansur
- Purna Kumar Sharma

== Aftermath ==
On 25 September 2001, Koirala nominated Govind Raj Joshi as joint general secretary, Arjun Narasingha KC as party spokesman and Mahantha Thakur as treasurer.
