= Arzu Rana Deuba =

Nepali politician (born 1962)

- आरजु राणा देउवा
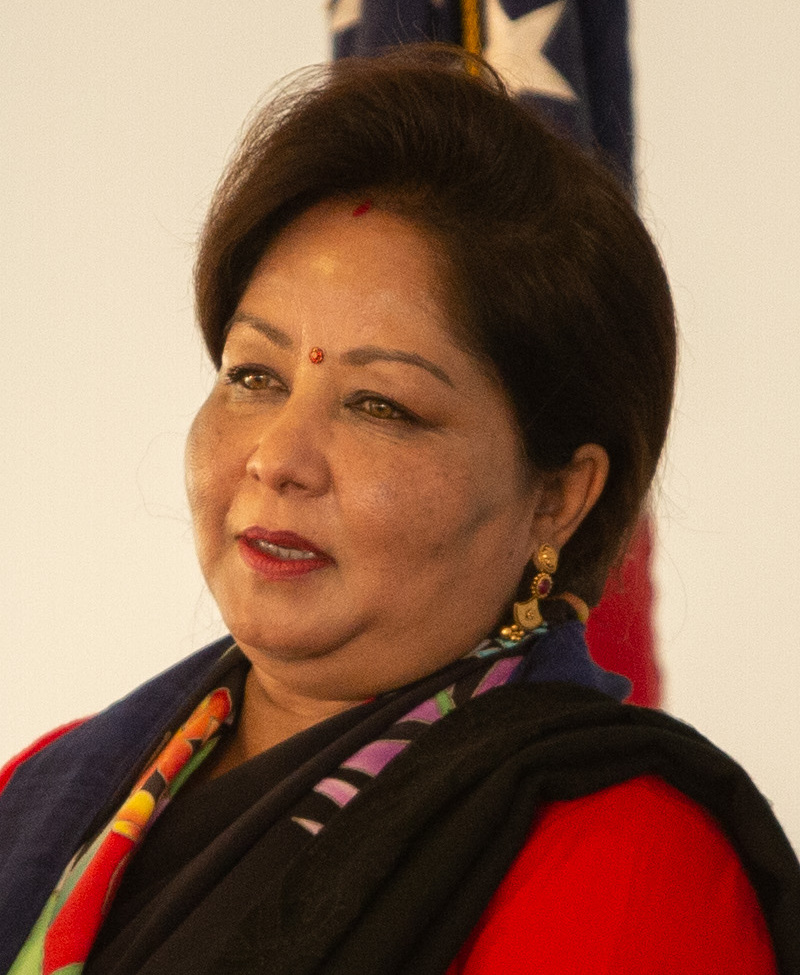
- Deuba in 2021

Minister of Foreign Affairs of Nepal
- In office 15 July 2024 – 9 September 2025
- President: Ram Chandra Poudel
- Prime Minister: KP Sharma Oli
- Preceded by: Narayan Kaji Shrestha
- Succeeded by: Bala Nanda Sharma

Member of the House of Representatives
- In office 22 December 2022 – 12 September 2025
- PR group: Khas Arya (Women)
- Constituency: Nepali Congress PR list

Member of the Legislature Parliament
- In office 21 January 2014 – 14 October 2017
- PR group: Khas Arya (Women)
- Constituency: Nepali Congress PR list

Member of the Constituent Assembly of Nepal
- In office 28 May 2008 – 28 May 2012
- PR group: Khas Arya (Women)
- Constituency: Nepali Congress PR list

Personal details
- Born: Arzu Rana; 26 January 1962 (age 64) Lalitpur, Nepal
- Citizenship: Nepali
- Party: Nepali Congress
- Spouse: Sher Bahadur Deuba (m. 1994)
- Parents: Binod Shumsher Jung Bahadur Rana (father); Prativa Rana (mother)
- Relatives: Juddha Shumsher Jung Bahadur Rana (grandfather)
- Education: St. Bede's College, Shimla; Himachal Pradesh University; Panjab University (MA, PhD in Organizational Psychology, 1990)
- Profession: Politician; Social work

Arzu Rana Deuba (Nepali: आरजु राणा देउवा) (born 26 January 1962) is a Nepali politician, who previously served as the Minister of Foreign Affairs. She served as the Chairperson of the Parliamentary Committee on Agriculture, Cooperatives and Natural Resources from August 2023 to July 2024.

Dr. Deuba joined the Nepali Congress in 1996 and was elected Central Committee member of the party in 14th general convention of Nepali Congress. In the 2022 Nepalese general election she was elected as a proportional representative from the Khas people category. She is married to former Prime Minister of Nepal, Sher Bahadur Deuba.

Deuba has pursued issues such as women's rights, reproductive rights, equal citizenship rights, property rights, violence against women, and equitable political representation while writing the Constitution of Nepal. She has also highlighted the disproportionate impact of climate change on Nepali women, particularly those in rural and mountainous communities who face increased burdens from water scarcity, food insecurity, agricultural disruption, and climate-induced disasters.

She was a member of the Constitution Drafting Committee and served as Chair of the Women Parliamentarians Coordination Committee. Deuba has established a number of NGOs in Nepal, including RUWDUC, Saathi, SMNF, and SAMANTA, a research-based institute for social and gender equality. She has also served as an elected regional councilor for South and East Asia for IUCN and sits on boards including Ipas and the Mahatma Gandhi Institute of Education for Peace and Sustainable Development.

== Education ==
Deuba graduated from Padmakanya College, Bagmati Province. She obtained her master's degree from Punjab University. She also obtained her PhD in Organizational Psychology in 1990 from Punjab University in India.

== Political career ==
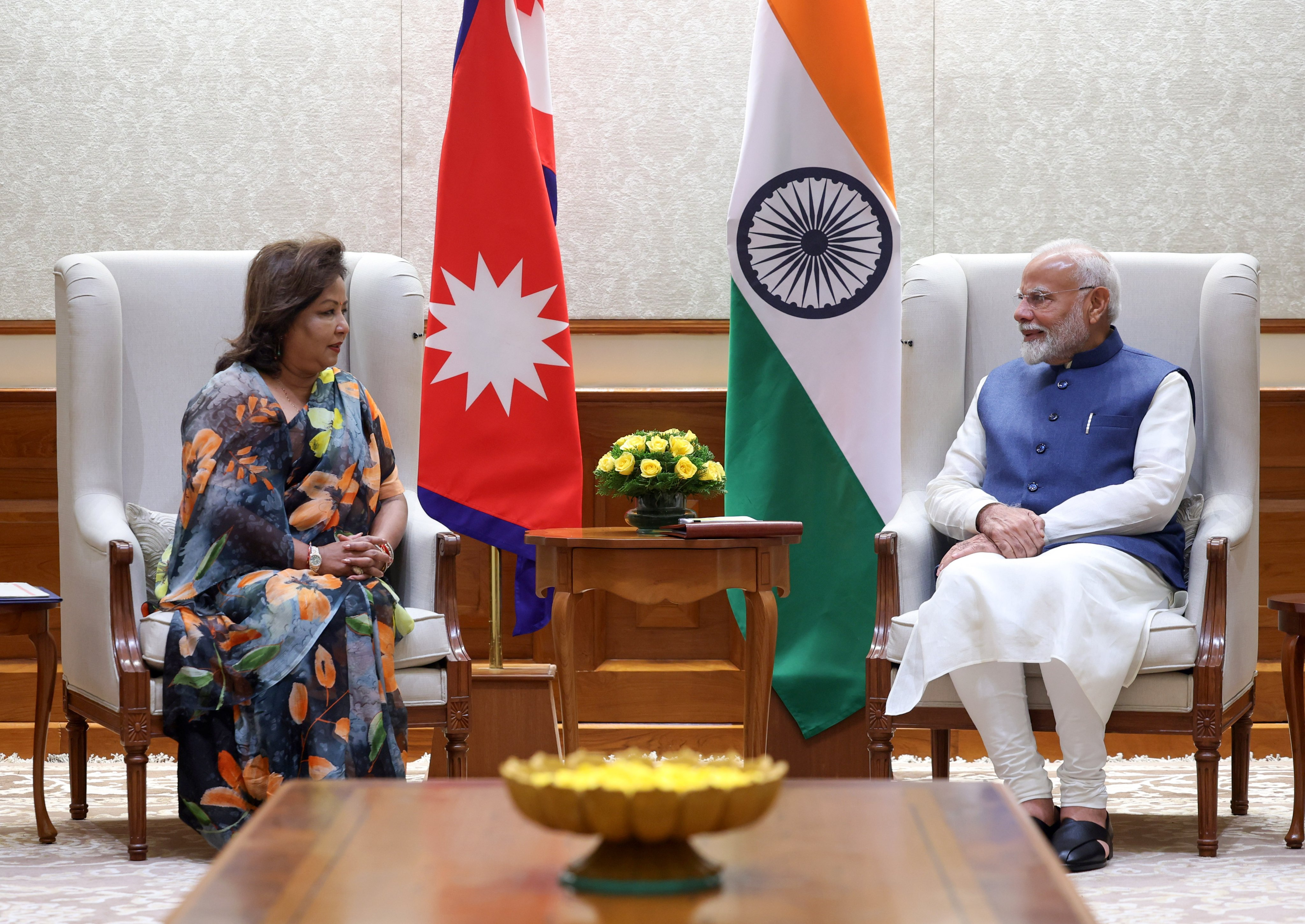
Arzu Rana Deuba with Prime Minister of India Narendra Modi

Deuba has been a member of the Nepali Congress Party since 1996. Since 2000, she has been a member of the Nepali Congress Party convention and Central Leadership Voting Committee. She was a member of the Constituent Assembly and Parliament of Nepal for ten years (2008–2017). She worked extensively on constitutional provisions for women's rights and representation.

== Social work ==
Deuba has established several NGOs in Nepal focused on women and children, including Saathi (1992), the Rural Women's Development and Unity Centre (1995), the Safe Motherhood Network Federation (1996), and Samanata – Institute for Social & Gender Equality (1997).

== Controversies and Allegations ==
Deuba has faced allegations of corruption and abuse of authority. Reports in The Kathmandu Post claimed she benefited from public contracts and exerted influence over government transfers and appointments, and her name has been linked to the Bhutanese refugee scam and land irregularities in Tikapur, though she has not been formally charged. In August 2024, activist Yubraj Safal filed a complaint against her at the Commission for the Investigation of Abuse of Authority (CIAA).

== Personal life ==
She is married to Sher Bahadur Deuba, former Prime Minister of Nepal and former president of the Nepali Congress Party. During the 2025 Gen Z protests, the couple were injured and taken into police custody after their house was attacked and set on fire on 9 September.

== Electoral History ==
In the 2017 general election, Deuba contested the House of Representatives seat from Kailali 5 as a candidate of the Nepali Congress. The election was widely viewed as a test of her individual political standing, as it marked her first direct electoral contest after previously serving in the Constituent Assembly through the proportional representation system. She faced CPN-UML candidate Narad Muni Rana, who was considered to have a strong local support base in the constituency. The election was also influenced by the broader left alliance formed between the CPN-UML led by K.P. Sharma Oli and the CPN (Maoist Centre) led by Pushpa Kamal Dahal, which had consolidated communist votes in several constituencies. Deuba was defeated by Rana by a margin of 4,880 votes, receiving 22,322 votes against Rana’s 27,202 votes.

Elections	Parliament of Nepal	Constituency	Political party	Result	Vote percentage	Opposition		
Elections	Parliament of Nepal	Constituency	Political party	Result	Vote percentage	Candidate	Political party	Vote percentage
2017	5th	Kailali 5	NC	Lost	36.59%	Narad Muni Rana	CPN(UML)	44.59%
