= Syangja 2 =

Parliamentary constituency of Syangja District in Nepal

- Parliamentary constituency for the House of Representatives
- Syangja 2 in Gandaki Province

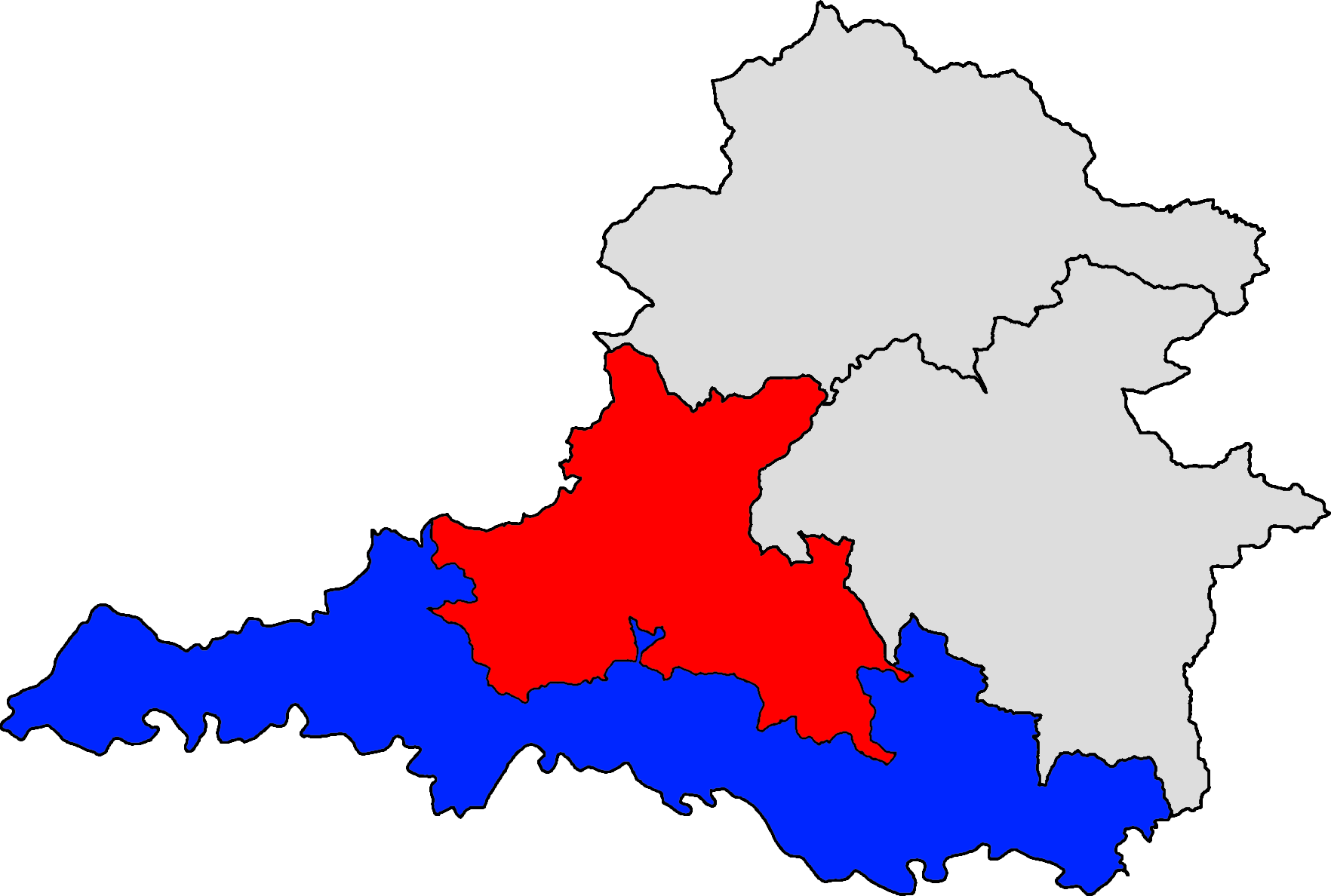
- Assembly segments Syangja 2(A) and Syangja 2(B) within Syangja District
- Province: Gandaki Province
- District: Syangja District
- Electorate: 101,349

Current constituency
- Created: 1991
- Party: Rastriya Swatantra Party
- MP: Jhabilal Dumre
- Gandaki MPA 2(A): Mohan Prasad Regmi (NCP)
- Gandaki MPA 2(B): Bhagwat Prakash Malla (NC)

Syangja 2 is one of two parliamentary constituencies of Syangja District in Nepal. This constituency came into existence based on the Constituency Delimitation Commission (CDC) report submitted on 31 August 2017.

== Incorporated areas ==
Syangja 2 incorporates Kaligandaki Rural Municipality, Galyang Municipality, Chapakot Municipality, wards 5–9, Waling municipality, and Bheerkot municipality.

== Assembly segments ==
It encompasses the following Gandaki Provincial Assembly segment

- Syangja 2(A)
- Syangja 2(B)

== Members of Parliament ==
=== Parliament/Constituent Assembly ===
Election	Member	Party
1991	Rudra Man Gurung	Nepali Congress
1994	Dhruba Raj Lamsal	CPN (Unified Marxist–Leninist)
1999	Gopal Man Shrestha	Nepali Congress
2008	Gopal Man Shrestha	Nepali Congress
2013	Kamal Prasad Pangeni	Nepali Congress
2017	Padma Kumari Aryal	CPN (Unified Marxist–Leninist)
May 2018	Padma Kumari Aryal	Nepal Communist Party
March 2021	Padma Kumari Aryal	CPN (Unified Marxist–Leninist)
2022	Dhanraj Gurung	Nepali Congress
2026	Jhabilal Dumre	Rastriya Swatantra Party

=== Provincial Assembly ===
==== 2(A) ====
Election	Member	Party
2017	Mohan Prasad Regmi	CPN (Unified Marxist-Leninist)
May 2018	Mohan Prasad Regmi	Nepal Communist Party

==== 2(B) ====
Election	Member	Party
2017	Bhagwat Prakash Malla	Nepali Congress

== Election results ==
=== Election in the 2020s ===
==== 2026 general election ====
Candidate	Party	Votes	%
Jhabilal Dumre	Rastriya Swatantra Party	25,354	40.72
Bhagwat Prakash Malla	Nepali Congress	20,830	33.45
Khim Bahadur Thapa	CPN (UML)	14,108	22.66
Others		1,974	3.17
Total		62,266	100.00
Valid votes		62,266	95.90
Invalid/blank votes		2,662	4.10
Total votes		64,928	100.00
Registered voters/turnout		117,930	55.06
Majority		4,524	
Rastriya Swatantra Party gain			
Source: Election Commission of Nepal

==== 2022 general election ====
Candidate	Party	Votes	%
Dhanraj Gurung	Nepali Congress	31,466	46.51
Padma Kumari Aryal	CPN (UML)	25,839	38.19
Tika Raj Gurung	Rastriya Swatantra Party	8,113	11.99
Others		2,239	3.31
Total		67,657	100.00
Majority		5,627	
Nepali Congress gain			

==== 2022 provincial election ====
===== 2(A) =====
Candidate	Party	Votes	%
Bhojraj Aryal	Nepali Congress	15,161	49.74
Mohan Prasad Regmi	CPN (UML)	12,431	40.78
Sagar Gaihre	Rastriya Prajatantra Party	1,457	4.78
Raju Gurung	Mongol National Organisation	869	2.85
Others	563	1.85	
Total		30,481	100.00
Majority		2,730	
Nepali Congress			

===== 2(B) =====
Candidate	Party	Votes	%
Mahesh Bhattarai	Nepali Congress	18,788	49.69
Buddhiman Shrestha	CPN (UML)	17,002	44.97
Kamal Prasad Dumre	Rastriya Prajatantra Party	884	2.34
Others	1,136	3.00	
Total		37,810	100.00
Majority		1,786	
Nepali Congress			

=== Election in the 2010s ===
==== 2017 legislative elections ====
Party	Candidate	Votes
CPN (Unified Marxist–Leninist)	Padma Kumari Aryal	35,142
Nepali Congress	Gopal Man Shrestha	31,436
Others		1,077
Invalid votes		1,827
Result	CPN (UML) gain	
Source: Election Commission

==== 2017 Nepalese provincial elections ====
===== 2(A) =====
Party	Candidate	Votes
CPN (Unified Marxist–Leninist)	Mohan Prasad Regmi	16,613
Nepali Congress	Bishnu Paudel	13,140
Others		660
Invalid votes		833
Result	CPN (UML) gain	
Source: Election Commission

===== 2(B) =====
Party	Candidate	Votes
Nepali Congress	Bhagwat Prakash Malla	19,170
CPN (Maoist Centre)	Surya Prasad Gairhe	17,630
Others		799
Invalid votes		604
Result	Congress gain	
Source: Election Commission

==== 2013 Constituent Assembly election ====
Party	Candidate	Votes
Nepali Congress	Kamal Prasad Pangeni	17,791
CPN (Unified Marxist–Leninist)	Krishna Khand	16,264
UCPN (Maoist)	Kalpana Aryal	2,809
Others		1,420
Result	Congress hold	
Source: NepalNews

=== Election in the 2000s ===
==== 2008 Constituent Assembly election ====
Party	Candidate	Votes
Nepali Congress	Gopal Man Shrestha	17,247
CPN (Unified Marxist–Leninist)	Chakra Bahadur Parajuli	12,173
CPN (Maoist)	Deepa Bhushal	11,824
CPN (United)	Rudra Bahadur Thapa	1,089
Others		3,539
Invalid votes		2,471
Result	Congress hold	
Source: Election Commission

=== Election in the 1990s ===
==== 1999 legislative elections ====
Party	Candidate	Votes
Nepali Congress	Gopal Man Shrestha	21,572
CPN (Unified Marxist–Leninist)	Prem Narayan Sharma Paudel	13,991
Rastriya Prajatantra Party	Neel Kantha Kafle	3,687
Others		2,222
Invalid Votes		1,088
Result	Congress gain	
Source: Election Commission

==== 1994 legislative elections ====
Party	Candidate	Votes
CPN (Unified Marxist–Leninist)	Dhruba Raj Lamsal	14,820
Nepali Congress	Gopal Man Shrestha	12,236
Independent	Surya Prasad Regmi	5,995
Rastriya Prajatantra Party	Pitambar Thapa	4,569
Others		1,296
Result	CPN (UML) gain	
Source: Election Commission

==== 1991 legislative elections ====
Party	Candidate	Votes
Nepali Congress	Rudra Man Gurung	15,999
CPN (Unified Marxist–Leninist)		13,285
Result	Congress gain	

== See also ==
- List of parliamentary constituencies of Nepal
