= Mangala Devi Singh =

Nepali politician

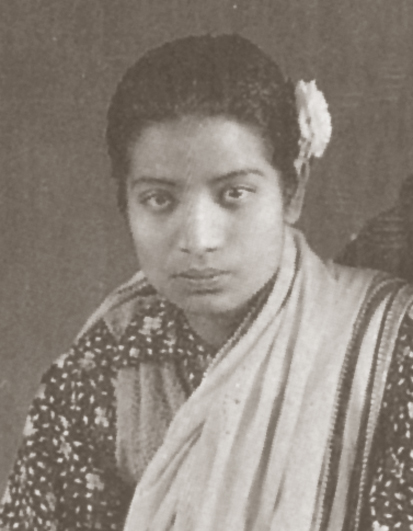
- Mangala Devi Singh in 1951

1st President of the Nepal Womans' Association
- In office 1947–1952

Personal details
- Born: December 10, 1925
- Died: August 26, 1996 (aged 70)
- Cause of death: Kidney Failure
- Spouse: Ganesh Man Singh
- Known for: Feminism; Founder of the Nepal Womans' Association

Mangala Devi Singh (Nepali: मंगलादेवी सिंह) was a pioneer feminist and prominent democratic right activist of Nepal. Singh got involved in politics in 1940 at the age of 16. Her husband was the leading Nepali Congress Leader Ganesh Man Singh.

In 1948 Mangala Devi Singh led a delegation to Prime Minister Padma Shumsher to demand education, employment and voting rights for women.

In 1952 the Nepal Women's Association had an ideological split, with Mangala leading a faction which believed that women's rights could be attained through democratic reform. while another faction, led by Kamaksha Devi held the belief that only a radical change could provide women with their rights, this division culminated later that year when a decision to protest the arrival of First Indian Prime Minister Jawaharlal Nehru caused Mangala to lose her support. During the protest police arrested a number of women attempting to reach the Prime Minister to protest radically with black flags, contrary to this Mangala welcomed Nehru alone. This act lead to her removal as president and replacement with Kamaksha Devi.

She died in August 1996 of Kidney Failure, Aged 70
