= Ganesh Man Singh =

Nepali politician (1915–1997)

- गणेशमान सिंह
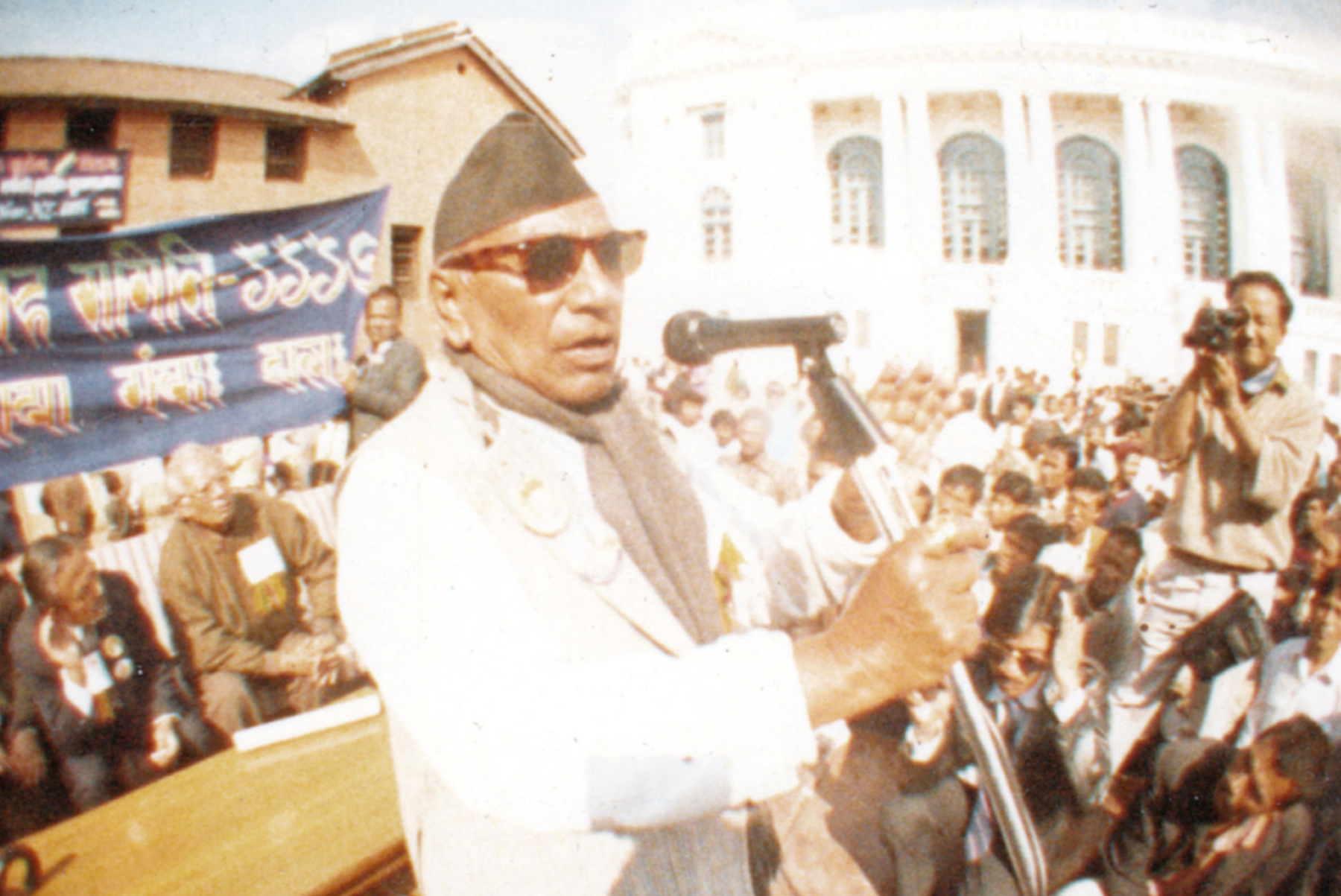
- Singh in 1993
- Born: November 9, 1915; Itumbahal, Kathmandu, Nepal
- Died: September 18, 1997 (aged 81); Chaksibari, Kathmandu, Nepal
- Organization(s): Nepali Congress, Nepal Praja Parishad
- Movement: Nepalese Democratic Movement
- Spouse: Mangala Devi Singh
- Awards: Nepal Ratna (2010)

Ganesh Man Singh (Nepali: गणेशमान सिंह; November 9, 1915 – September 18, 1997) was a Nepali politician who was leader of the 1990 Nepalese revolution. He is considered the Father of Democracy and the Iron-man of Nepali politics by many. He joined Praja Parishad to protest against the autocratic rule of the Ranas.

== Early life ==
Ganesh Man Singh was born on November 9, 1915 in Itum Bahal, Kathmandu. His father was Gyan Man Singh, and his mother was Sanunani Shrestha Singh. His father died when he was young, so his grandfather, Ratna Man Singh (who was a BadaHakim in the Rana regime), raised him.

He studied at Durbar High School till class 6 when he was rusticated from the school for not respecting his fellow Rana students. He then went to Calcutta to study where he completed his matriculation from Vidyasagar College in the first division. He studied until ISc (Intermediate of Science) then returned to Nepal in 1938.

== Early political career ==
He first joined Praja Parisad, the first political party of Nepal. Three months after his marriage to Mangala Devi Singh, he was sentenced to life imprisonment for his political activities. He eventually escaped from prison and continued his resistance against the Ranas under the pseudonym Krishna Bahadur Pradhan.

== Leader of Nepali Congress ==
Ganesh Man Singh was one of the leaders of the Nepali Congress Movement in 2007 B.S., which was able to overthrow the Rana Regime. In 2015, B.S., he was elected as a Member of Parliament from Kathmandu and later became a Cabinet Minister. After the coup d'état by King Mahendra, Singh became a major advocate for democracy in Nepal. He was the Supreme Commander of 1990 people's movement. After the death of B.P. Koirala he was considered the "Supreme Leader" of Nepali Congress, the title he held throughout his life.

== Later life ==
After the coup of 1960, Singh was held without trial for eight years at the Sundarijal Military Detention Camp.

Singh received the United States Peace Run Prize in 1990 for his contribution to peace in Nepal and the world, and his leadership quality. He was also decorated by the "U Thant Peace Award".

Singh was awarded the "Human Rights Prize" for his contributions to human rights by the United Nations in 1993. He is the first Statesman from South Asia to receive this prestigious award.

The Ganesh Man Singh Foundation was established in the commemoration of Singh's achievements.
