= 12th general convention of Nepali Congress =

2010 internal election of Nepali Congress

12th General Convention of Nepali Congress
- 17–21 September 2010

50% + 1 votes needed to avoid a runoff
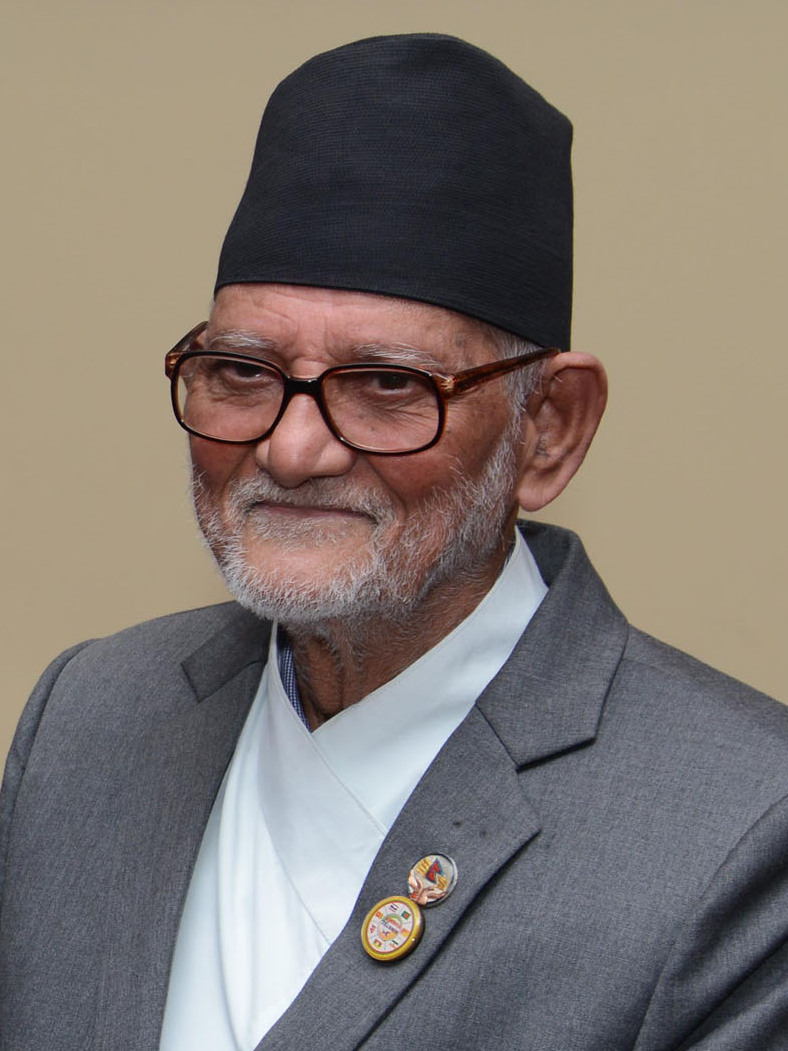

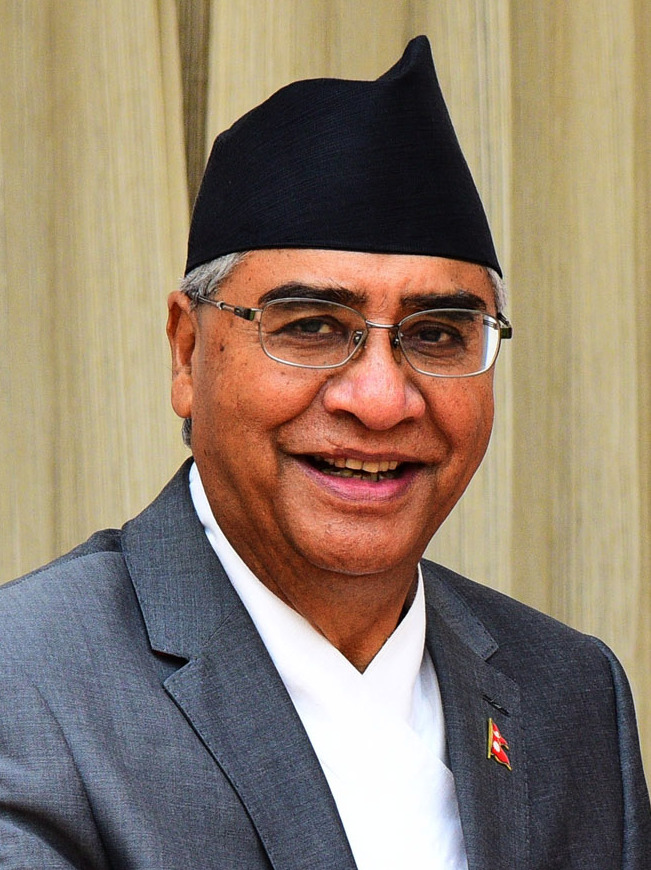
Candidate	Sushil Koirala	Sher Bahadur Deuba	Bhim Bahadur Tamang
Votes	1,692	1,317	78
%	54.81	42.66	2.53
President before election
Girija Prasad Koirala
Elected President
Sushil Koirala

The 12th General Convention of the Nepali Congress party was held in Kathmandu from September 17–21, 2010. Elections were held for the posts of President, General Secretary and Treasurer. The convention also elected 61 members to the party's Central Working Committee (CWC).

== Election results ==
President

Candidate	Votes	%
Sushil Koirala	1,692	54.81
Sher Bahadur Deuba	1,317	42.66
Bhim Bahadur Tamang	78	2.53
Total	3,087	100

General Secretary

Candidate	Votes	%
Prakash Man Singh	1,656	54.28
Bimalendra Nidhi	1,226	40.18
Narahari Acharya	152	4.98
Invalid	17	0.56
Total	3,051	100

Treasurer

Candidate	Votes	%
Chitra Lekha Yadav	1,557	52.13
Padma Narayan Chaudhari	1,430	47.87
Total	2,987	100

Central Working Committee (CWC) Members

Elections to the 61 CWC seats were held in three categories : 25 seats were contested under the open category, 14 seats under the zonal category and 22 seats under reserved quotas for women, Dalit, Madeshi, Muslim and Janajati categories.

Elected in open category:

Winner	Votes
Gagan Thapa	2,061
Arjun Narasingha K.C.	2,034
Khum Bahadur Khadka	1,791
Shashanka Koirala	1,767
Pradeep Giri	1,741
Sujata Koirala	1,739
Ram Chandra Paudel	1,703
Ram Sharan Mahat	1,699
Bal Krishna Khand	1,606
NP Saud	1,556
Shekhar Koirala	1,531
Mahesh Acharya	1,501
Minendra Rijal	1,435
Prakash Sharan Mahat	1,382
Krishna Sitaula	1,373
Chandra Bhandari	1,368
Narayan Khadka	1,340
Gopal Man Shrestha	1,286
Bal Bahadur KC	1,286
Purna Bahadur Khadka	1,246
Shankar Bhandari	1,219
Kul Bahadur Gurung	1,155
Man Mohan Bhattarai	1,080
Gyanendra Bahadur Karki	1,068
Dip Kumar Upadhyay	1,020

Elected in zonal category:

Zone	Winner
Bagmati	Nabindra Raj Joshi
Bheri	Kishore Singh Rathore
Dhaulagiri	Arjun Joshi
Gandaki	Surendra Pandey
Janakpur	Ananda Prasad Dhungana
Karnali	Jeevan Bahadur Shahi
Koshi	Amod Prasad Upadhyay
Lumbini	Krishna Chandra Nepali
Mahakali	Dilendra Prasad Badu
Mechi	Narendra Bikram Nembang
Narayani	Ramesh Rijal
Rapti	Deepak Giri
Sagarmatha	Ram Kumar Chaudary
Seti	Badri Pandey

Elected in Janajati, Women, Dalit, Madhesi and Muslim category:

Electoral Category	Winner	Votes
Janajati	Bhishma Raj Angdembe	834
	Surya Man Gurung	724
	Dhanraj Gurung	667
	Sita Gurung	1,003
	Ratna Sherchan	878
Women	Pushpa Bhusal	1,470
	Mina Pandey	1,419
	Kamala Devi Pant	1,242
	Ambika Basnet	1,103
	Mahalaxmi Upadhaya Dina	1,007
	Ishwari Neupane	832
Dalit	Min Bahadur Bishwokarma	1,445
	Man Bahadur Bishwokarma	1,421
	Jiwan Pariyar	959
	Sujata Pariyar	1,640
	Kabita Sardar	1,237
Madhesi	Umakanta Chaudhari	1,089
	Ajay Chaurasiya	963
	Mahendra Yadav	914
	Parbati D.C Chaudhari	1,414
	Minakshi Jha	1,395
