= Madhu Prasad Acharya =

Nepalese politician

- मधु प्रसाद आचार्य

Vice President of the Nepali Congress
- Incumbent
- Assumed office 29 October 2026 Serving with Pushpa Bhusal, Chandra Bhandari, Binod Chaudhary
- President: Gagan Thapa

Personal details
- Born: 29 January 1965 (age 61) Kavrepalanchok, Nepal
- Party: Nepali Congress
- Spouse: Kamala Panta
- Occupation: Engineer

Madhu Prasad Acharya (Nepali: मधु प्रसाद आचार्य) is a Nepalese politician serving as the Vice President of the Nepali Congress party since 2026.

Acharya was a member of parliament candidate from Nepali Congress for Kavrepalanchok-2 constituency in 2026 Nepalese general election.

== Electoral history ==
=== 2026 Nepalese General Election ===
Candidate	Party	Votes	%
Badan Kumar Bhandari	Rastriya Swatantra Party	53,344	53.67
Madhu Prasad Acharya	Nepali Congress	17,868	17.98
Ashok Kumar Byanju Shrestha	CPN (UML)	13,940	14.03
Basundhara Humagain	Nepali Communist Party	8,107	8.16
Jyotsana Saiju	Ujyaalo Nepal Party	3,749	3.77
Ranjib Shrestha	Rastriya Prajatantra Party	997	1.00
Muna Tamang	Nepal Workers' and Peasants' Party	427	0.43
Tanka Bahadur Lama	Shram Sanskriti Party	383	0.39
Others		576	0.58
Total		99,391	100.00
Rastriya Swatantra Party gain			
