= Sher Bahadur Deuba =

Nepali politician (born 1946)

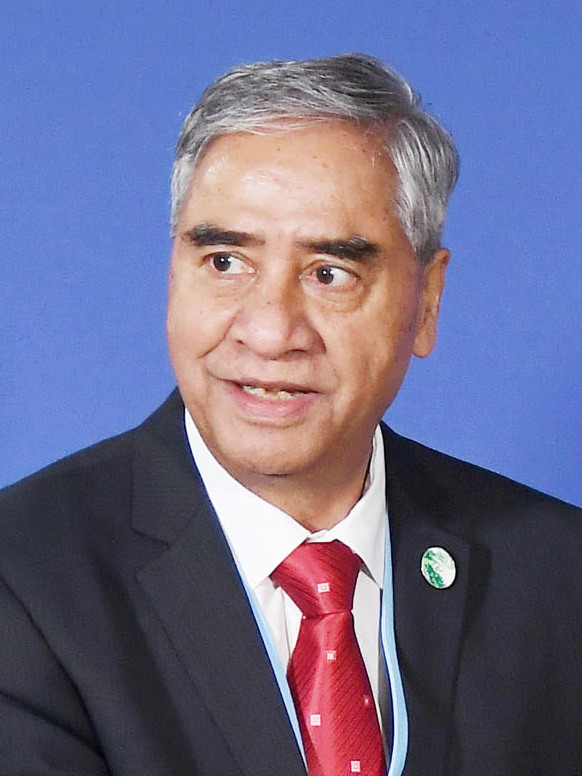
- Deuba in 2021

Prime Minister of Nepal
- In office 13 July 2021 – 26 December 2022
- President: Bidya Devi Bhandari
- Preceded by: K. P. Sharma Oli
- Succeeded by: Pushpa Kamal Dahal
- In office 7 June 2017 – 15 February 2018
- President: Bidya Devi Bhandari
- Deputy: Bijay Kumar Gachhadar
- Preceded by: Pushpa Kamal Dahal
- Succeeded by: K. P. Sharma Oli
- In office 4 June 2004 – 1 February 2005
- Monarch: Gyanendra
- Preceded by: Surya Bahadur Thapa
- Succeeded by: Girija Prasad Koirala (Note: King Gyanendra ruled the country directly until 25 April 2006)
- In office 26 July 2001 – 4 October 2002
- Monarch: Gyanendra
- Preceded by: Girija Prasad Koirala
- Succeeded by: Lokendra Bahadur Chand (Note: King Gyanendra ruled the country directly until 11 October 2002)
- In office 12 September 1995 – 12 March 1997
- Monarch: Birendra
- Preceded by: Man Mohan Adhikari
- Succeeded by: Lokendra Bahadur Chand
Other senior positions
Leader of the Opposition
In office 4 March 2024 – 15 July 2024
Prime Minister	Pushpa Kamal Dahal
Preceded by	K. P. Sharma Oli
Succeeded by	Pushpa Kamal Dahal
In office 26 December 2022 – 27 February 2023
Prime Minister	Pushpa Kamal Dahal
Preceded by	K. P. Sharma Oli
Succeeded by	K. P. Sharma Oli
In office 15 February 2018 – 13 July 2021
Prime Minister	K. P. Sharma Oli
Preceded by	K. P. Sharma Oli
Succeeded by	K. P. Sharma Oli
In office 7 March 2016 – 4 August 2016
Prime Minister	K. P. Sharma Oli
Preceded by	Sushil Koirala
Succeeded by	K. P. Sharma Oli
In office 30 November 1994 – 12 September 1995
Prime Minister	Man Mohan Adhikari
Preceded by	Man Mohan Adhikari
Succeeded by	Man Mohan Adhikari
Minister of Home Affairs
In office 26 May 1991 – 30 November 1994
Monarch	Birendra
Prime Minister	Girija Prasad Koirala
Preceded by	Yog Prasad Upadhyay
Succeeded by	K. P. Sharma Oli
President of the Nepali Congress
In office 7 March 2016 – 16 January 2026
Vice President	Bimalendra Nidhi; Bijay Kumar Gachhadar; Purna Bahadur Khadka; Dhanraj Gurung
Preceded by	Sushil Koirala
Succeeded by	Gagan Thapa
Parliamentary offices
Member of the House of Representatives
In office 4 March 2018 – 12 September 2025
Preceded by	Himself (as Member of the Legislature Parliament)
Succeeded by	Tara Prasad Joshi
Constituency	Dadeldhura 1
In office 28 April 2006 – 16 January 2008
Preceded by	Himself (2002)
Succeeded by	Himself (as Member of the Constituent Assembly)
Constituency	Dadeldhura 1
In office 20 June 1991 – 22 May 2002
Preceded by	Constituency created
Succeeded by	Himself (2006)
Constituency	Dadeldhura 1
Member of the Constituent Assembly / Legislature Parliament
In office 28 May 2008 – 14 October 2017
Preceded by	Himself (as Member of Parliament)
Succeeded by	Himself (as Member of Parliament)
Constituency	Dadeldhura 1

Personal details
- Born: 13 June 1946 (age 80) Ashigram, Nepal
- Party: Nepali Congress
- Other political affiliations: Nepali Congress (Democratic) (2002–2007)
- Spouse: Arzu Rana Deuba
- Children: Jaiveer Singh Deuba
- Education: Tribhuvan University (BA, LL.B, MA), LSE
- Website: sherbahadurdeuba.com

Sher Bahadur Deuba (Note: Nepali: शेरबहादुर देउवा, pronounced [seɾ baːduɾ deu̯ba]) (born 13 June 1946) is a Nepalese politician who served as the Prime Minister of Nepal for five terms between 1995 and 2022. He was the president of the Nepali Congress since 2016 until 2026 and was the Member of Parliament for the parliamentary constituency of Dadeldhura 1 before the parliament was dissolved on 12 September 2025. During the Gen Z protests, he and his wife, Arzu Rana Deuba, were physically assaulted by protesters at their residence. His tenure in office has been controversial for nepotism, corruption and disillusionment with citizens.

Born and raised in Ashigram, a remote village in Ganyapdhura Rural Municipality of Dadeldhura, Deuba completed his primary education there and his secondary education in Doti. He completed his higher education at Tri-Chandra College In 1991, he was elected to the House of Representatives and served as the Minister of Home Affairs in the cabinet led by Girija Prasad Koirala. Deuba became prime minister after Man Mohan Adhikari tried to dissolve the parliament for the second time in two years in 1995. He oversaw the signature of the Mahakali treaty with India during his first term. His second premiership started in July 2001 amidst the rise of the Maoists and he later declared a state of emergency and listed the Communist Party of Nepal (Maoist) as a "terrorist organization". He was dismissed by King Gyanendra in October 2002, but after a public backlash, he was reappointed prime minister in June 2004. He was arrested after the 2005 coup d'état by King Gyanendra, and released in February 2006 after the Supreme Court declared his arrest unlawful.

Deuba was sworn in as prime minister for a fourth stint in June 2017, as per an agreement to form a rotational government by Congress and the CPN (Maoist Centre). His government successfully conducted the elections of all three levels of government in different phases in 2017. On 12 July 2021, the Supreme Court ordered the appointment of Deuba as prime minister within 28 hours, and he was appointed prime minister for a fifth term by President Bidya Devi Bhandari in accordance with Article 76(5) of the Constitution of Nepal the next day.

== Early life and education ==
Deuba was born on 13 June 1946 in Ashigram, Kingdom of Nepal. He completed his primary education from Ashigram Primary School. He then attended Mahendra High School in Doti where he completed his School Leaving Certificate exam. He moved to Kathmandu for his higher education and in 1963 enrolled in Tri-Chandra College.

In 1988, Deuba, with the help of acting Nepali Congress president Krishna Prasad Bhattarai, got a scholarship through Socialist International and was sent to London to attend the London School of Economics where he was a research student studying political science. In London he worked as a part-time translator for the BBC World Service.

== Political career ==
=== Beginnings (1963–1990) ===
He started his political career as the member of the Far Western Zonal Student Union in 1963. The organization was founded by students from Far-Western Development Region who were studying in Kathmandu at the time. While studying at Tri-Chandra Multiple Campus, he became a member of the Arjun Narasingha K.C. led Student Rally Coordination Committee along with Ram Chandra Paudel. He became a founding member of the Nepal Student Union in 1970. The next year, he became the president of the union, a position that he held for eight years.

Deuba was arrested in connection with the Jaisidewal bomb plot. He served nine years in jail during the 1970s and 80s for his participation in pro-democracy activities.

=== Multiparty era (1991–2002) ===
After the 1990 revolution, Deuba came back from London and was elected from Dadeldhura 1 at the 1991 election from Nepali Congress. He became Home Minister in Girija Prasad Koirala's cabinet.

He was reelected from Dadeldhura 1 at the 1994 election. Following the party losing their majority in the election, outgoing Prime Minister Koirala did not stand for re-election as parliamentary party leader and Deuba was elected unopposed after rivals Ram Chandra Paudel and Shailaja Acharya withdrew their candidacy.

==== First cabinet (1995–1997) ====
After the minority government of Manmohan Adhikari fell, Deuba was appointed as prime minister in 1995 with the support of Rastriya Prajatantra Party and Nepal Sadbhawana Party. He came into controversy for having 52 cabinet members in his eighteen month long tenure a move that was criticized by party president Girija Prasad Koirala. His government was also accused of bribing MPs from minor parties and sending Rastriya Prajatantra Party MP's to Bangkok in order to avoid key votes in the parliament. His administration also introduced pensions, allowances and other privileges for legislators.

Deuba's administration frequently solicited the advice of the opposition in major domestic and foreign policy issues. His cabinet signed the Mahakali treaty with India, which had been initiated by the previous CPN (UML) government, introduced a system of voter ID and ended dual ownership of land through consensus in the parliament. Contunuing with party policy, his administration favored economic liberalization that the Koirala government in 1991 had started. Value-added taxes were introduced during his tenure. Deuba completed state visits to India, China, Pakistan, the United Kingdom and the United States during his tenure.

He resigned in March 1997 after two MPs from his party abstained from voting against a no-confidence motion. He also resigned as parliamentary party leader after losing support in the parliamentary group and was replaced by Girija Prasad Koirala.

In the 1999 election, Deuba was reelected from Dadeldhura 1. After the resignation of Krishna Prasad Bhattarai as prime minister and parliamentary party leader, Deuba faced off against Girija Prasad Koirala at the party but lost. He also lost stood against Koirala at the party's tenth general convention in January 2001 for the past of party president but faced defeat again.

==== Second cabinet (2001–2002) ====
After Koirala was forced to resign following the Holeri scandal in July 2001, Deuba defeated Sushil Koirala in the contest for parliamentary party leader and was appointed as prime minister for the second time. His government invited the Maoists for negotiations and agreed upon a cease-fire with them until the end of negotiations. The special Socio-Economic Reform Programs which covered land reforms, abolition of social discrimination, electoral reforms and women's property rights were brought in by his government as preemptive measures before negotiations with the Maoists. Following a breakdown in negotiations, the Maoists resumed their attacks on the government and a state of emergency was declared for six months in February 2002 after a parliamentary vote.

The July 2002 local elections were also postponed following the escalation of violence. After Deuba failed to get a two-thirds majority to extend the state of emergency and dissent within his party on the government's handling of the Maoist issue, Deuba requested King Gyanendra to dissolve the parliament and called for new elections within the next six months.

The Deuba government failed to hold new elections and asked for fourteen more months citing the growing Maoist insurgency. He was subsequently removed as prime minister by King Gyanendra in November 2002. Removing an elected prime minister was seen as a autocratic move from the king and was followed by wide spread protests.

=== Nepali Congress (Democratic) (2002–2007) ===
Deuba's move to extend the state of emergency and dissolving the House of Representatives was severely criticized by party chairman Girija Prasad Koirala. After Deuba was expelled from the Nepali Congress, his faction of the party called a general convention that deposed Koirala . Koirala declared this general convention illegal and was supported by two-thirds of the members of the committee. In September 2002, the Election Commission declared that Koirala's group was the official Nepali Congress following which Deuba split the party and formed Nepali Congress (Democratic).

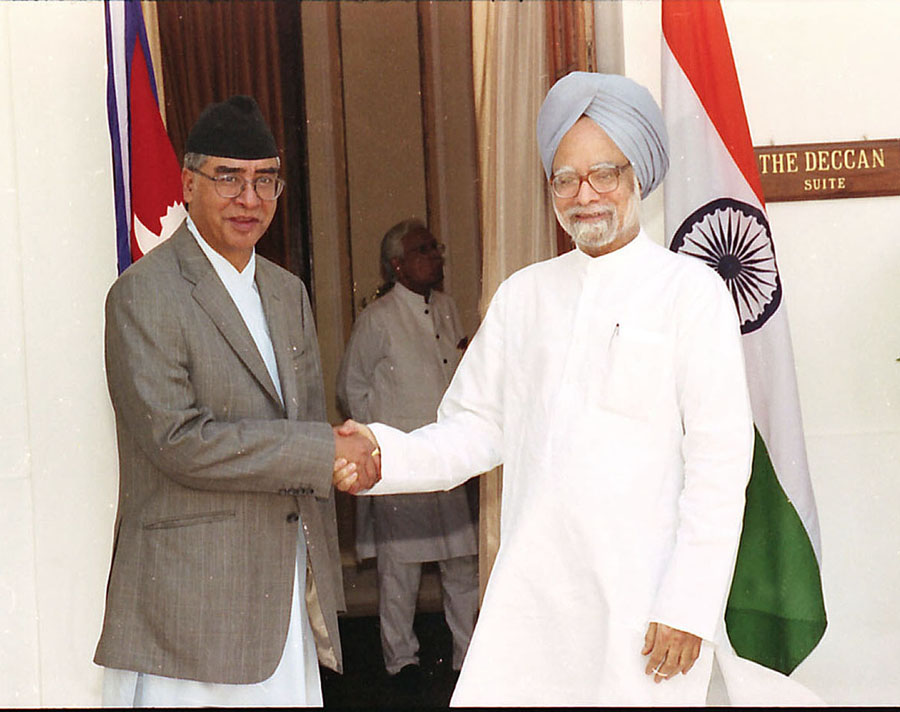
Sher Bahadur Deuba with Manmohan Singh in 2004

==== Third cabinet (2004–2005) ====
After months of protests from the major political parties, King Gyanendra agreed to let the parties nominate the next prime minister. When no consensus was reached among the parties, Deuba was reinstated as prime minister in June 2004.

He remained as prime minister until 1 February 2005, when the king seized executive power and placed leading politicians including Deuba under house arrest. In July, Deuba was sentenced to two years in jail on corruption charges related to Melamchi Water Supply Project by the Royal Commission on Corruption Control set up by King Gyanendra. After the Supreme Court dismissed the commission for being unconstitutional, he was released from prison.

In September 2007, he re-united the Nepali Congress (Democratic) with the Nepali Congress.

=== Constituent Assembly (2008–2015) ===
He was elected from Dadeldhura 1 and Kanchanpur 4 at the 2008 Constituent Assembly election, the latter of which he vacated. Deuba was the candidate for Nepali Congress for prime minister but lost to CPN (Maoist) leader Pushpa Kamala Dahal, 464-113. He faced off against Ram Chandra Poudel for parliamentary party leader but lost. Deuba also unsuccessfully challenged acting president Sushil Koirala at the party's 12th general convention in September 2010.

He was reelected from Dadeldhura 1 at the 2013 Constituent Assembly election. He challenged party president Sushil Koirala for parliamentary party leader but lost.

=== Congress president (2016–2026) ===
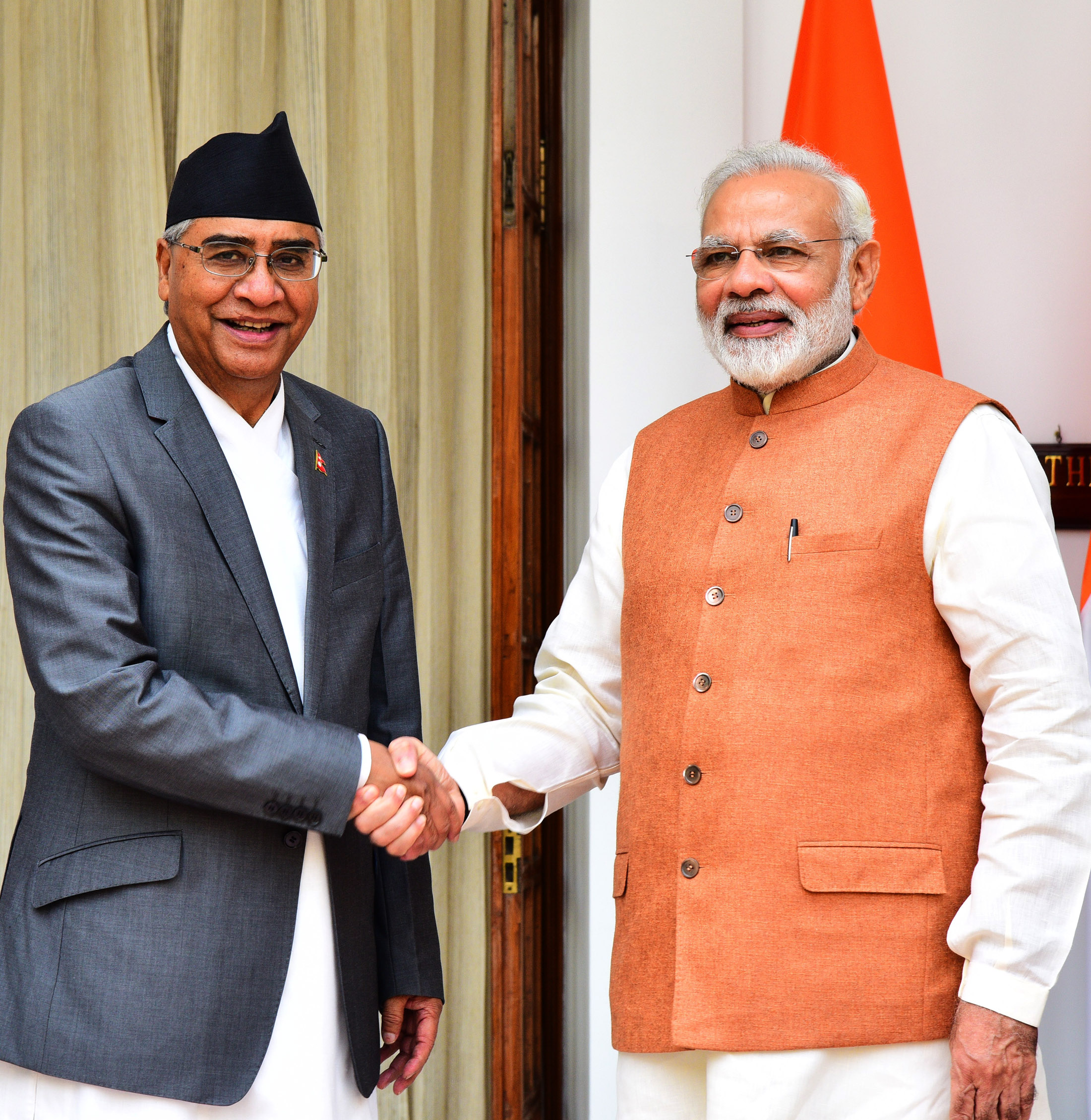
Deuba with his Indian counterpart, Narendra Modi, in 2017

At the party's 13th general convention, Deuba contested against Ram Chandra Poudel and Krishna Prasad Sitaula for party president. Deuba fell 11 votes short of winning in the first round and was elected in the second round, defeating Poudel with 58% of the vote.

==== Fourth cabinet (2017–2018) ====
In August 2016, the party agreed on a deal with CPN (Maoist Centre) to run the government for nine months each until the next election. As per the agreement, Deuba was sworn in as prime minister for the fourth time on 7 June 2017. He was elected from Dadeldhura 1 at the 2017 election but the left alliance of CPN (UML) and CPN (Maoist Centre) gained a majority in the House of Representatives. He resigned in February 2018 to make way for the new government. In the contest for parliamentary party leader he defeated Prakash Man Singh.

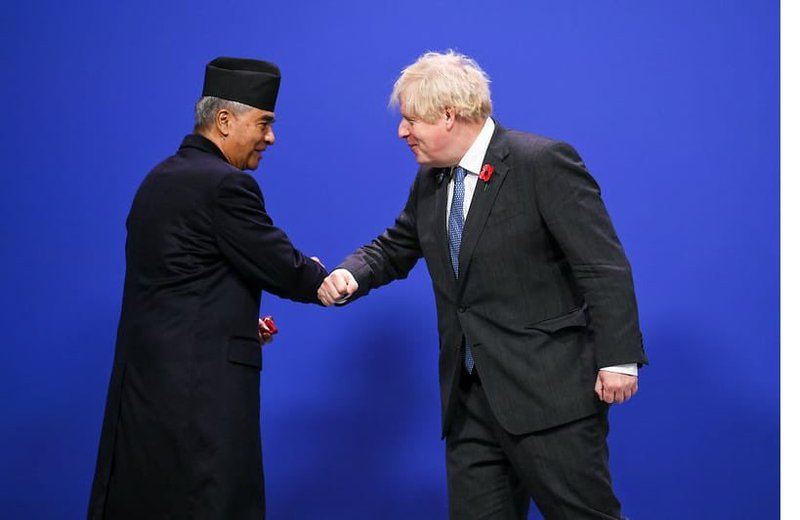
PM Deuba with Boris Johnson in London in 2021 COP26

==== Fifth cabinet (2021–2022) ====
After KP Sharma Oli lost a no-confidence motion against him, Deuba was proposed as prime minister by the CPN (Maoist Centre) and some members of the opposition CPN (UML). President Bidhya Devi Bhandari denied this claim and reappointed Oli as prime minister who requested that the House of Representatives be dissolved and called for new elections. This was met by a legal challenge in the Supreme Court which ruled in favor of restoring the lower house and appointing Deuba as prime minister in July 2021. Deuba was then appointed prime minister for the fifth time.

At the party's 14th general convention in December 2021, he faced a challenge from Shekhar Koirala, Prakash Man Singh, Bimalendra Nidhi and Kalyan Gurung. Deuba got 48% of the vote in the first round and faced Koirala in the second round. Deuba was re-elected as president defeating Shekhar Koirala with 60% of the vote after Singh and Nidhi supported him in the second round.

He was reelected from Dadeldhura 1 at the 2022 election. He was also re-elected as the parliamentary party leader, surviving a challenge from general secretary Gagan Thapa. Deuba was replaced by Pushpa Kamal Dahal following the election.

== Controversies ==
Deuba's tenure in public office has been marked by persistent accusations of nepotism, corruption, and weak governance. Critics have also pointed to repeated episodes of political instability during his five terms as Prime Minister, and his role in escalating the Maoist insurgency through a series of failed negotiations and emergency measures.

=== Bloated Cabinet and Party Split (1995) ===
During his first term as Prime Minister, Deuba drew widespread criticism for assembling a cabinet of 52 ministers over an eighteen-month tenure — a move condemned as an exercise in patronage politics and criticised openly by Nepali Congress party president Girija Prasad Koirala. Tensions between Deuba and Koirala's faction deepened over subsequent years. After Deuba was expelled from the Nepali Congress in 2002, his supporters convened a general convention that removed Koirala from the party presidency. Koirala declared the convention illegal, and in September 2002, the Election Commission ruled that Koirala's group was the official Nepali Congress, after which Deuba formally established the Nepali Congress (Democratic).

=== Handling of the Maoist Insurgency and State of Emergency (2001–2002) ===
Deuba's second premiership, which began in July 2001 amid the escalating Maoist insurgency, has been the subject of sustained criticism. After peace negotiations collapsed, his government declared a six-month state of emergency in February 2002 and designated the Communist Party of Nepal (Maoist) a terrorist organisation. Critics and political scholars have argued that Deuba bore significant responsibility for the failure of early-stage peace talks, having disregarded a list of Maoist demands presented to the government in January 1996.

His government also dissolved elected local bodies and replaced them with appointed government officials in July 2002, a measure condemned as democratic backsliding. Deuba further introduced the Terrorist and Destructive Activities (Control and Punishment) Act (TADA), which human rights organisations criticised for its overly broad scope and potential for misuse. After Deuba failed to secure a two-thirds majority to extend the state of emergency, King Gyanendra dismissed him in November 2002 on grounds of incompetence.

=== Melamchi Corruption Conviction (2005) ===
In July 2005, Deuba was convicted by the Royal Commission on Corruption Control — established by King Gyanendra following his seizure of executive power — and sentenced to two years in prison on charges of embezzling funds in connection with the Melamchi Water Supply Project. Deuba refused to appoint legal counsel or respond to the charges, asserting that the commission was unconstitutional. The United States government expressed concern over the conviction, noting that the commission had served as investigator, prosecutor, and judge simultaneously, and that the Asian Development Bank — the project's principal donor — had examined similar allegations and found no supporting evidence. The Supreme Court of Nepal subsequently struck down the commission as unconstitutional, and Deuba was released from prison in February 2006.

=== Press Freedom and Intimidation of Journalists (2025) ===
In 2025, journalist Dil Bhusan Pathak was charged under the Electronic Transactions Act after alleging on his YouTube channel that Deuba's son, Jaiveer Singh Deuba, was linked to questionable dealings involving the new Hilton Kathmandu. The case drew further attention when a media house director alleged that Foreign Minister Arzu Rana Deuba had pressured her outlet over its coverage of the journalist's case — an allegation the minister denied. The Committee to Protect Journalists described the charge against Pathak as emblematic of growing risks journalists face in Nepal for critically reporting on powerful figures.

=== 2025 Gen Z Protests, Attack on Residence, and Money Laundering Inquiry ===
On 9 September 2025, amid the Gen Z uprising, protesters vandalised and set fire to Deuba's residence in Budhanilkantha. Viral videos circulated online showing individuals removing and burning stacks of banknotes from inside the property; fact-checkers confirmed the footage was authentic. Deuba and his wife Arzu Rana Deuba sustained injuries during the attack.

In the aftermath, the Department of Money Laundering Investigation opened a formal inquiry into Deuba, along with former prime ministers KP Sharma Oli and Pushpa Kamal Dahal, and former ministers Arzu Rana Deuba and Deepak Khadka, on suspicion of accumulating illegal wealth through abuse of public office. The inquiry — described as the first of its kind against such long-serving political figures — covers wealth, companies, and financial transactions across three generations of the Deuba family.

== Personal life ==
Deuba is married to Arzu Rana Deuba. They have a son, Jaybir Singh Deuba. In November 2016, Deuba was conferred an honorary doctorate degree by Jawaharlal Nehru University in India. During the 2025 Nepalese Gen Z protests, Deuba and his wife were injured after their house was attacked and set on fire by protesters on 9 September and were rescued by Nepal Army and Armed Police Force officers.

== Electoral performance ==
Election	House	Constituency	Party	Votes	Result
1991	House of Representatives	Dadeldhura 1	Nepali Congress	24,570	Elected
1994	House of Representatives	Dadeldhura 1	Nepali Congress	20,701	Elected
1999	House of Representatives	Dadeldhura 1	Nepali Congress	28,651	Elected
2008	Constituent Assembly	Dadeldhura 1	Nepali Congress	20,529	Elected
2008	Constituent Assembly	Kanchanpur 4	Nepali Congress	12,824	Vacated
2013	Constituent Assembly	Dadeldhura 1	Nepali Congress	23,920	Elected
2017	House of Representatives	Dadeldhura 1	Nepali Congress	28,446	Elected
2022	House of Representatives	Dadeldhura 1	Nepali Congress	25,534	Elected

== See also ==
- Nepali Congress (Democratic)
- Nepali Congress (Deuba Faction)
- 2nd special convention of Nepali Congress

== Notes ==
Party political offices
Preceded by Sushil Koirala	President of the Nepali Congress; 2016–present	Incumbent
Political offices
Preceded by Man Mohan Adhikari	Prime Minister of Nepal; 1995–1997	Succeeded by Lokendra Bahadur Chand
Preceded by Girija Prasad Koirala	Prime Minister of Nepal; 2001–2002	Succeeded by Lokendra Bahadur Chand
Preceded by Surya Bahadur Thapa	Prime Minister of Nepal; 2004–2005	Succeeded by Girija Prasad Koirala
Preceded by Pushpa Kamal Dahal	Prime Minister of Nepal; 2017–2018	Succeeded by KP Sharma Oli
Preceded by KP Sharma Oli	Prime Minister of Nepal; 2021–2022	Succeeded by Pushpa Kamal Dahal
Diplomatic posts
Preceded by Chandrika Kumaratunga	Chair of the South Asian Association for Regional Cooperation; 2002	Succeeded by Zafarullah Khan Jamali
