= Nepal Farmers Association =

Farmer's wing of Nepali Congress Party

- नेपाल किसान संघ
- Founded: 1951
- Founder: BP Koirala and others
- Location: Nepal
- Members: ▲200,000+ (2023)
- Chairman: Ganesh Timalsina
- Parent organization: Nepali Congress
- Affiliations: Asia Pacific Farmers Forum

The Nepal Farmers Association is the most peasant's wing of Nepali Congress established in 1951. The association was formed by first people's elected prime minister BP Koirala in 1951. The association aims to ensure peasant rights and develop the agriculture sector.

The association follows party's ideology and aims to bring commercialization in the agriculture sector. The organization aims in providing farmers with quality education which would play an important role to develop economic services of farmers in Nepal. The current membership of NFA is 2,00,000.

== Leadership ==
=== Chairman ===
- Ganesh Timalsina
