= Padma Kumari Aryal =

Nepali politician

- पद्मा कुमारी अर्याल

Minister of Agriculture and Livestock Development
- In office 3 August 2018 – 25 December 2020
- President: Bidya Devi Bhandari
- Prime Minister: KP Oli
- Preceded by: Ghanashyam Bhusal
- Succeeded by: Shiva Maya Tumbahamphe

Minister of Land Management, Cooperatives and Poverty Alleviation
- In office 3 August 2018 – 25 December 2020
- President: Bidhya Devi Bhandari
- Prime Minister: KP Oli

State Minister of Health and Population
- In office 16 March 2018 – 3 August 2018
- President: Bidya Devi Bhandari
- Prime Minister: KP Oli

Member of Parliament, Pratinidhi Sabha
- In office 4 March 2018 – 18 September 2022
- Preceded by: Kamal Prasad Pangeni
- Constituency: Syangja 2

Member of Constituent Assembly for CPN (UML) party list
- In office 28 May 2008 – 28 May 2012

Personal details
- Born: 1 January 1969 (age 57)
- Party: CPN (UML)
- Website: padmaaryal.com

Padma Kumari Aryal is a Nepali communist politician, a former member of the House of Representatives, former cabinet minister for Land Management, Cooperatives and Poverty Alleviation and current Minister of Agriculture and Livestock Development. She was also previously the Minister of State for Health and Population.

== CPN UML career ==
As of 2017, she was the central committee member of CPN UML and district chairperson of Syangja district for the party.

== 2017 legislative election ==
In the federal legislative election of 2017, she was the CPN UML candidate for Syangja-2 constituency under the first-past-the-post system. She won the election, defeating her nearest rival Gopal Man Shrestha of Nepali Congress by more than 3,500 votes. She received 35,142 votes to Shrestha's 31,436. She was one of only eight women elected to parliament by a direct vote of the people in the 2017 election.

== Personal life ==
Aryal has four brothers and three sisters. Her mother died in October 2018.
