= Ashigram =

Ashigram आशिग्राम
- Village development committee
- Location in Nepal
- Coordinates: 29.22°N 80.65°E
- Country: Nepal
- Province: Sudurpashchim Province
- District: Dadeldhura District

Population (1991)
  - Total: 2,708
- Time zone: UTC+5:45 (Nepal Time)

Ashigram is a village development committee in Dadeldhura District in Sudurpashchim Province of western Nepal. At the time of the 1991 Nepal census it had a population of 2708 people living in 468 individual households.
