= 13th general convention of Nepali Congress =

2016 internal election of Nepali Congress

13th General Convention of Nepali Congress
- 3–6 March 2016

50% + 1 votes needed to avoid a runoff
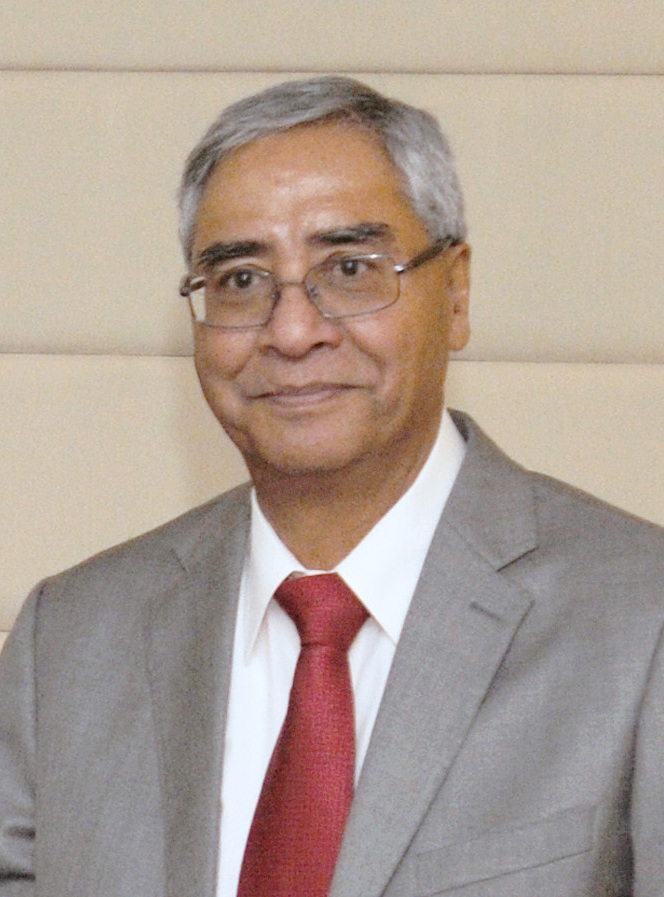

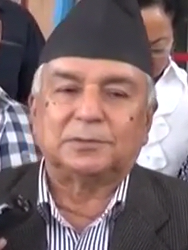

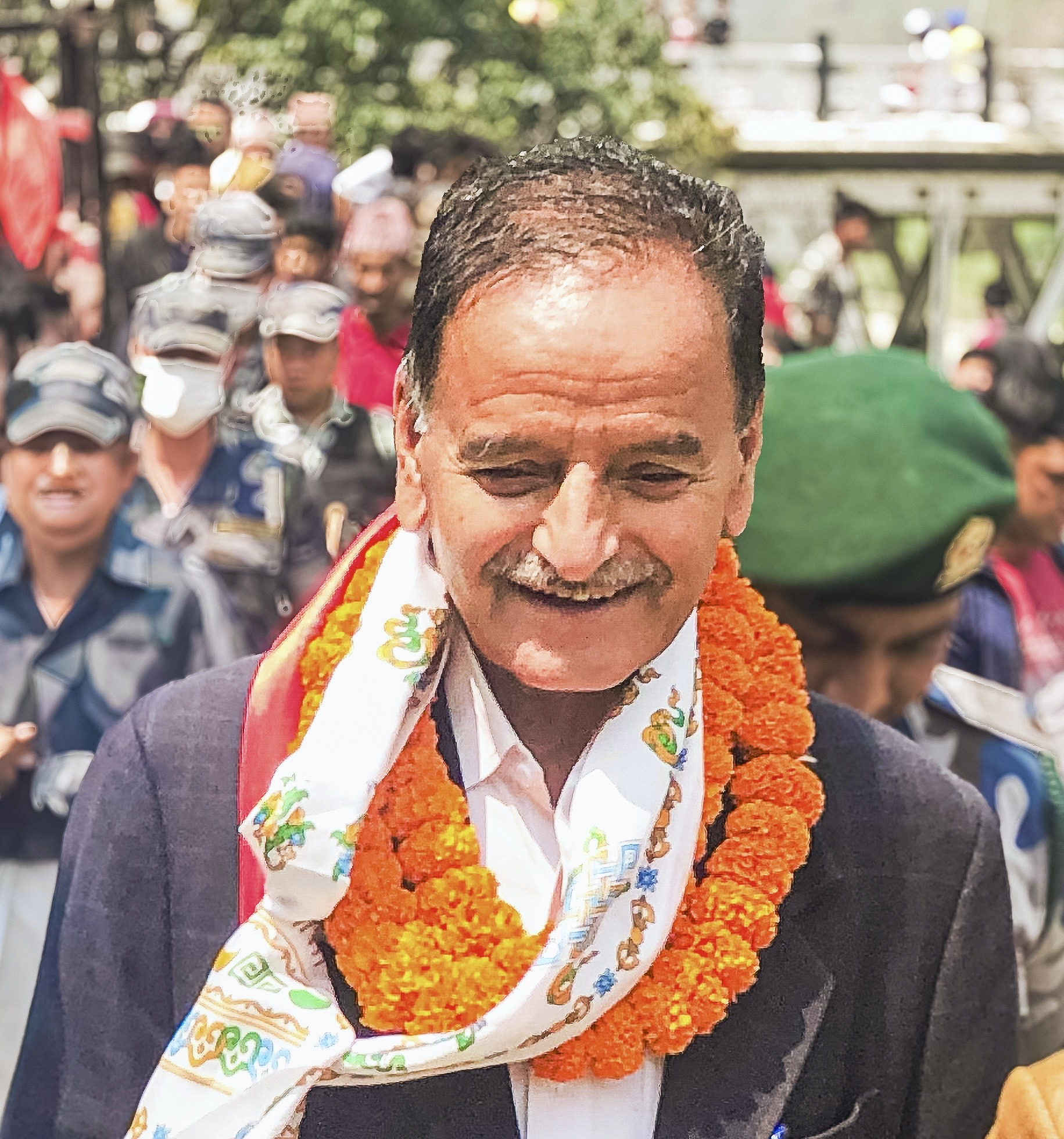
Candidate	Sher Bahadur Deuba	Ram Chandra Paudel	Krishna Prasad Sitaula
First Round	1564	1160	324
Runoff	1822	1296	Eliminated
President before election
Sushil Koirala
Elected President
Sher Bahadur Deuba

The 13th General Convention of the Nepali Congress was held in Kathmandu from March 3–6, 2016. Elections were held for the posts of President, General Secretary and Treasurer.

== Election results ==
=== 2nd Round for Party President ===
Candidate's Name	Votes		Percentage	Result	Reference
Candidate's Name	Obtained	Total	Percentage	Result	Reference
Sher Bahadur Deuba	1822	3140	58.03%	Elected	
Ram Chandra Paudel	1296	3140	41.27%		

=== 1st Round for Party President ===
Candidate's Name	Votes		Percentage	Result	Reference
Candidate's Name	Obtained	Total	Percentage	Result	Reference
Sher Bahadur Deuba	1564	3148	49.68%	Round 2	In 2nd round for not crossing 50%(+1) votes.
Ram Chandra Paudel	1160	3148	36.85%	Round 2	In 2nd round for not crossing 50%(+1) votes.
Krishna Prasad Sitaula	324	3148	10.29%	Eliminated	In 2nd round for not crossing 50%(+1) votes.

=== General Secretary ===
Candidate	Votes	%	Result	Reference
Sashank Koirala	1,417	46.95	Elected	
Arjun Narsingh KC	1,017	33.70		
Gagan Thapa	584	19.35		
Total	3018	100		

=== Treasurer ===
Candidate	Votes	%	Result	Reference
Sita Devi Yadav	1217	41.27	Elected	
Chitra Lekha Yadav	1209	40.99		
Umakanta Chaudhary	457	15.50		
Krishna Karki	66	2.24		
Total	2949	100		
