= Deopa =

देऊपा(देउवा)
- Language: Kumaoni, Doteli

Origin
- Region of origin: Uttarakhand

Deopa (Devanagari: देऊपा/देउवा/देउबा) is a surname found in Kumaon region of the Indian state of Uttarakhand and Nepal. In Uttarakhand Deopa is a caste of the Kshatriya Rajputs (Thakurs) .

== History ==
According to Edwin T Atkinson 'The Himalayan Gazetteer' and History of Kumaon by Badri Dutt Pandey , " Kumaun ka itihas vol 2", Deopas are one of the five Panchpurviya.

Panchpurviya are Five Clans namely: Deopa (Village Roba, Garkha Paspa), Serari (Village Sangor, Sorari Talli Malli), Puruchuda (Village Rundakot, Garkha Puruchudi), Chiral (Village Chhawati Chiral) and Paderu (Garkha Paderu) were known as Panch-purviyas. They were introduced in Doti and settled in Kumaon by King Ratan Chand after granting them jagirs. These Five Rajput clans were relatives of the Chand kings.The Chand community comprises several clans, including subclans of the Chands such as the Serari, as well as other lineages historically associated with the Katyuri dynasty. Among these, the Deopas constitute one such clan. The Chand community comprises various different clans and Deopas are one of them.

According to historian Prayag Joshi, the clan had initially migrated from Sindh. In Descriptive List of the Martial Castes of the Almora District by Ganga Dutt Upreti, it is stated: “These people, who originally travelled to Nepal and thence to Kumaun, were employed here by Raja Udyot Chand as warriors in his army.” The name may also have originated from the root word Deva/Deo, which was a common suffix used by the Kshatriyas at that time.

Deo was also used as a suffix by both the Chands kings and Katyuris as well.
