= Nepal Woman Association =

Women's wing of Nepali Congress Party

- Founded: 8 August 1947 (78 years ago)
- Founder: Mangala Devi Singh
- Type: Women's wing
- Headquarters: Kathmandu, Nepal
- Chairperson: Mina Kharel
- Parent organization: Nepali Congress
- Affiliations: Socialist International Women
- Website: www.nwa.org.np

Nepal Woman Association is the woman wing of Nepali Congress.

== History ==
Nepal Woman Association was formed by Mangala Devi Singh, the pioneer of Nepalese woman movement. It is the first female political organization of Nepal.
