= Dhanraj Gurung =

Nepali politician

Honourable Dhanraj Gurung MP
- धनराज गुरुङ

Minister of Law, Justice and Parliamentary Affairs
- In office 3 May 2023 – 4 March 2024
- President: Ram Chandra Poudel

Vice President of Nepali Congress
- In office 16 December 2021 – 14 January 2026 Serving with Purna Bahadur Khadka
- President: Sher Bahadur Deuba
- Succeeded by: Pushpa Bhusal Gautam

Member of Parliament, House of Representatives
- In office 22 December 2022 – 12 September 2025
- Preceded by: Padma Kumari Aryal
- Constituency: Syangja 2

Member of Nepalese Constituent Assembly
- In office 2013 – 14 October 2017
- Constituency: Party list

President of Nepal Student Union
- In office 1996–1997
- Preceded by: Narayan Prakash Saud
- Succeeded by: Govinda Bhattarai

Personal details
- Born: 7 November 1966 (age 59) Syangja District, Nepal
- Party: Nepali Congress

Dhanraj Gurung (Nepali: धनराज गुरुङ) is a Nepali politician belonging to Nepali Congress. Gurung is former Minister for Law, Justice and Parliamentary Affairs of Nepal. He also served as a member of House of Representatives having been elected from Syangja 2.

He served as the vice president of the Nepali Congress along with Purna Bahadur Khadka. He's also a former member of 2nd constituent assembly. Gurung has previously served as the president of Nepal Student Union, the student wing of Nepali Congress for a brief period.

== See also ==
- Nepali Congress
