= Nepali Congress =

Social democratic political party in Nepal

Nepali Congress नेपाली कांग्रेस Nēpālī kāṅgrēs
- Abbreviation: NC
- President: Gagan Thapa
- General Secretary: Pradip Paudel; Udaya Shumsher Rana; Dila Sangraula
- Presidium: Central Working Committee (CWC)
- Spokesperson: Devraj Chalise
- Senior Vice-president: Bishwa Prakash Sharma
- Vice President: Pushpa Bhusal; Chandra Bhandari; Madhu Acharya; Binod Chaudhary
- Treasurer: Umesh Shrestha
- Founder: B. P. Koirala and others
- Founded: 9 April 1950; 76 years ago
- Merger of: National Congress; Democratic Congress
- Headquarters: B.P. Smriti Bhawan, Lalitpur
- Think tank: Policy Research and Training Centre
- Student wing: Nepal Student Union
- Youth wing: Nepal Tarun Dal
- Women's wing: Nepal Woman Association
- Labour wing: Nepal Trade Union Congress
- Peasant's wing: Nepal Farmers Association
- Membership (October 2026): 969,842 increased from 870,106 (December 2021) +99,736 (▲11.46%)
- Ideology: Social democracy; Democratic socialism; Third Way
- Political position: Centre to centre-left
- Regional affiliation: Network of Social Democracy in Asia
- International affiliation: Socialist International; Progressive Alliance
- Colours: Green, Red
- ECN Status: National Party (2nd largest)
- House of Representatives: 38 / 275
- National Assembly: 24 / 59
- Provincial Assemblies: 176 / 550
- Chief Ministers: 4 / 7
- Mayors/Chairs: 333 / 753
- Councillors: 13,730 / 35,011

Election symbol
- BJP Election Symbol

Party flag

Website
- nepalicongress.org

The Nepali Congress (NC; Nepali: नेपाली कांग्रेस [neˈpali ˈkaŋres]), colloquially known as the Congress Party, or simply the Congress, is a social democratic political party in Nepal. With 969,842 members as of the party's 15th general convention in October 2026, it stands as the largest party by membership in Nepal. In June 2023, the party started online membership since the emergence of youth leaders in vital posts to attract youths to the party. The party remained the only among older parties to complete generation transition in leadership electing Gagan Thapa as party president in its 2nd special convention. The party had won 38 seats in the 2026 general election and remains as the largest parliamentary opposition group in the House of Representatives.

There have been seven Nepali Congress prime ministers and the party has led the government fourteen times. Matrika Prasad Koirala, a founding member of the party was appointed as the first commoner prime minister following the end of the Rana regime in 1951. Subarna Shumsher Rana, another founding member of the party was appointed prime minister in 1958. Congress is the only party in Nepal to have been elected with a majority, with the party forming majority governments in 1959, 1991 and 1999 under B.P. Koirala, Girija Prasad Koirala and K.P. Bhattarai respectively with B.P. Koirala becoming the first elected prime minister of the country. The party also formed coalition governments in 1995 and 1998 with Girija Prasad Koirala and Sher Bahadur Deuba as prime ministers. The party emerged as the largest party following the 2013 Constituent Assembly elections and led a coalition government under Sushil Koirala. After the promulgation of the constitution in 2015, the party led coalition governments under Deuba in 2017 and 2021.

The party was formed in 1950 by the merger of the Nepali National Congress and the Nepal Democratic Congress along democratic socialist lines. NC prime ministers led four governments between the fall of the Rana dynasty and the start of the Panchayat era, including the first democratically elected government of Nepal, after the 1959 general election.

== Background ==
In 1947, Bishweshwar Prasad Koirala published an appeal for a unified struggle of Nepali people against the Rana regime. That same year, some Nepalese met in Benaras and formed an organization by the name All Indian Nepali National Congress (Nepali: भारतीय नेपाली राष्ट्रिय कांग्रेस) where an ad-hoc committee was established. The initial officers were chairman Devi Prasad Sapkota, vice-president Balchandra Sharma, general secretary Krishna Prasad Bhattarai, and public minister Gopal Prasad Bhattarai, publicity minister. Its Working Committee included Batuk Prasad Bhattarai, Narayan Prasad Bhattarai, and Narendra Regmi, while its coordinator was Bishweshwar Prasad Koirala.

Around the same time, Nepalese located in Calcutta formed another organization by the name All Indian Nepali Gorkha Congress (Nepali: अखिल भारतीय गोर्खा कांग्रेस) whose chairman was Dharma Narayan Pradhan. Koirala travelled extensively to places such as Benaras, Calcutta, Darjeeling, Assam, Bhagsu, and Dehradun, and established contact with the Nepalese there. He met with Ganesh Man Singh during the same period. Nepalese representatives from different areas of Nepal and India organized one session in Calcutta. Koirala, Dilli Raman Regmi, Dharma Narayan Pradhan, and Dhan Man Singh Pariyar were present. In the same session, dropping Akhil Bharatiya from its name, the organization was named Nepali National Congress. Tanka Prasad Acharya, who was facing a life-sentence in Kathmandu, was made its chairman. The flag was square-shaped with white, blue, and red colors in succession, with the moon and the sun in its center.

The major four proposals passed by the session were to assist Indians in their independence movement, support Vietnam struggling for freedom against French colonization, ask for the immediate release of imprisoned members of the Nepal Praja Parishad, and initiate a non-violence movement in Nepal for the establishment of an accountable ruling system. The organization's modus operandi was chosen, and attached itself to the civil conscience process in Nepal by establishing Tanka Prasad Acharya as its chairman.

== History ==
=== Nepali Congress formation, 1946–1950 ===
The Nepali Congress Party was formed by the merger of Nepali National Congress and Nepal Democratic Congress. The Nepali National Congress was founded by BP Koirala in Calcutta, India on 25 January 1947. The Nepal Democratic Congress was founded by Subarna Shamsher Rana in Calcutta on 4 August 1948.

While returning from treatment from Mumbai, National Congress president B.P. Koirala met Surya Prasad Upadhyaya in Calcutta. Koirala also later met Subarna to propose a unification between their two parties. The two parties merged on 10 April 1950 to form the Nepali Congress. The unification was held at a movie theatre owned by Mahabir Shamsher Rana. Matrika Prasad Koirala became the first president of the unified party and Mahendra Bikram Shah was appointed as the general secretary. The party also called for an armed revolution against the Rana regime.

During the Bairgania Conference in Bairgania, Bihar, on 27 September 1950 the Nepali Congress announced an armed revolution against the Rana regime. The president of the party also announced the liquidation of operations in India and declared that the party would operate only inside Nepal.

After King Tribhuvan took refuge inside the Indian Embassy on 6 November 1950. The Congress Liberation Army decided to take this opportunity to launch attacks against the regime before the King "left Nepalese soil". Matrika and Bisheshwor Prasad Koirala and Subarna Shamsher Rana flew to Purnia, Bihar. They called the commanders posted at different locations inside Nepal to prepare for armed strikes near the Nepal-India border.

On 11 November 1950, at midnight Birgunj was attacked, and by 12 November it fell to the Nepali Congress and the first "People's Government" was declared. The liberation army was able to control most of the eastern hills of Nepal and the town of Tansen in Palpa. After pressure by the Indian government and the mass movement by the Nepali Congress and other political parties, the Rana government finally submitted to their demands and King Tribhuvan returned to the throne, replacing King Gyanendra, who had been crowned king after King Tribhuvan left for India.

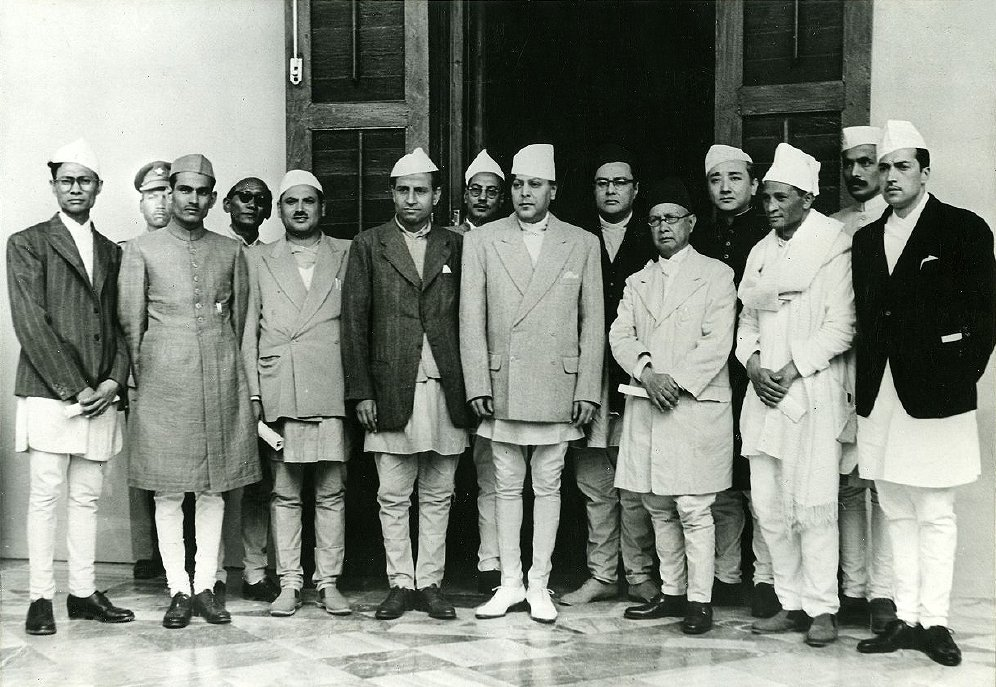
Nepali Congress leaders meeting King Tribhuvan

=== Transitional government, 1951–1959 ===
After the fall of the Rana government, the party joined a government under Mohan SJB Rana with B.P. Koirala, Subarna Shamsher Rana, Ganesh Man Singh, Bhadrakali Mishra and Bharat Mani Sharma serving as ministers. The Rana–Congress government was dissolved after ten months. Matrika Prasdad Koirala was appointed as prime minister in November 1951 becoming the first commoner to assume the role.

The party held its fifth general convention in Janakpurdham in May 1952. B.P. Koirala was elected as party president, and Dhanman Singh Pariyar and Rajeshwar Prasad Upadhyaya were elected as general secretaries.

The party asked Matrika to resign as prime minister in July 1952, but Matrika along with Naradmuni Thulung, Mahabir Shamsher and Mahendra Bikram Shah resigned from the central working committee instead. The party then moved to remove them as members. Bhadrakali Mishra formed the Nepali Jana Congress and Balchandra Sharma, Kedarman Vyathit and Bharatmani Sharma formed Nepali Congress Leftist in response to the move. In April 1953, Matrika formed the Rastriya Praja Party under his leadership.

The party held its sixth general convention in Birgunj in January 1956. The convention formally adopted socialism as the guiding principle of the party. Subarna Shamsher was elected as party president defeating Ganesh Man Singh for the post. Bishwa Bandhu Thapa and Tulsi Giri were elected as general secretaries by the convention. Later in September of the year, Rastriya Praja Party reunified with the party. Subarna resigned as president and in May 1957, a special general convention was held in Biratnagar that elected B.P. Koirala as party president with Thapa and Giri re-elected as general secretaries.

Subarna Shamsher Rana was appointed as chairman of an all-party interim cabinet in May 1958 to hold the first general election in the country. The much delayed elections were finally held in February 1959. Nepali Congress won 74 seats in the 109 member House of Representatives. Party president Bishweshwar Prasad Koirala became the first democratically elected prime minister of Nepal. Krishna Prasad Bhattarai from the party was also elected as the first speaker of the parliament.

In May 1960, the party held its seventh general convention. B.P. Koirala was again elected as party president, defeating his challenger Bhudev Rai. Shreebhadra Sharma and Tripurbarsingh Pradhan were elected as general secretaries.

=== Panchayat government, 1960–1990 ===
Following a royal coup by King Mahendra in 1960, many leaders of the party, including Koirala and General Secretary Hora Prasad Joshi, were imprisoned or exiled; others took political refuge in India. Subarna Shamsher who had gone to Kolkata for medical treatment, organized a special gathering where leaders of Nepal Rastrabadi Gorkha Parishad, Nepal Praja Parishad, Samyukta Prajatantra Party and Terai Congress joined the party. Subarna was elected as acting president, and the party announced an armed revolution to restore the parliament.

Although political parties were prohibited from 1960 to 1989 and remained outlawed during the Panchayat system under the aegis of the Associations and Organizations (Control) Act of 1963, the Nepali Congress persisted. The party placed great emphasis on eliminating the feudal economy and building a basis for socioeconomic development. It proposed nationalizing basic industries and instituting progressive taxes on land, urban housing, salaries, profits and foreign investments. While in exile, the Nepali Congress served as the nucleus around which other opposition groups clustered and instigated popular uprisings in the Hill and Terai regions. During this time, the Nepali Congress refused the overtures of a radical faction of the Communist Party of Nepal for a tactical alliance.

The Nepali Congress demonstrated endurance, but defection, factionalism, and external pressures weakened it over time. Nevertheless, it continued to be the only organized party to press for democratization. In the 1980 government system referendum, it supported the multiparty system in opposition to the panchayat system. The party boycotted the 1981 general election and rejected the new government. The death in 1982 of Bishweshwar Prasad Koirala further weakened the party.

After the party boycotted the 1986 general election to the Rastriya Panchayat, its members were allowed to run in the 1987 Nepalese local elections. In defiance of the demonstration ban, the Nepali Congress organized mass rallies with the communist factions in January 1990 that ultimately triggered the pro-democracy movement.

=== Post-Panchayat government, 1991–2002 ===
After the Jana Andolan I, party president Krishna Prasad Bhattarai was invited to form an interim coalition government. In the 1991 general election, the Nepali Congress won 110 of 205 seats but Bhattarai lost his seat and yielded the position of prime minister to Girija Prasad Koirala who held his seat until 1994.

During the 1994 general election, the Nepali Congress lost its majority to Communist Party of Nepal (Unified Marxist–Leninist). The CPN (UML) lacked a majority and formed a minority government. After 46 parliamentarians from the CPN (UML) quit to form the Communist Party of Nepal (Marxist–Leninist), the Nepali Congress formed their own government with the Rastriya Prajatantra Party and Nepal Sadbhawana Party. After CPN (UML) offered Lokendra Bahadur Chand the position of prime minister, the Rastriya Prajatantra Party led a government with the CPN (UML). Internal problems within the Rastriya Prajatantra Party caused one faction led by Surya Bahadur Thapa to lead a government with Nepali Congress and Nepal Sadbhawana Party.

Girija Prasad Koirala again became the Prime Minister in April 1998, leading a Congress minority government after Rastriya Prajatantra and Nepal Sadbhawana quit the government. Eventually, they got support from the CPN (ML) and after their withdrawal the CPN (UML) and Nepal Sadbhawana.

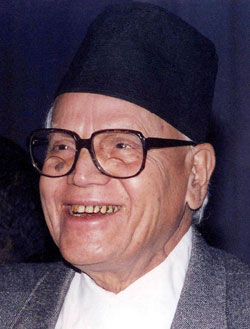
Krishna Prasad Bhattarai, former party president and Prime Minister of Nepal

During the 1999 general election, Girija Prasad Koirala stepped aside in favour of Krishna Prasad Bhattarai, who returned as Prime Minister when the Nepali Congress won 111 out of 205 House seats. Bhattarai resigned as prime minister on 16 March 2000 after conflicts between himself and supporters of Girija Prasad Koirala. In the party's first open leadership election, the parliamentarians selected Girija Prasad Koirala as their leader by 69–43 votes over Sher Bahadur Deuba. Accordingly, King Birendra designated Girija Prasad Koirala as prime minister on 20 March.

On 8 August 2000, Koirala dismissed the Minister of Water Resources, Khum Bahadur Khadka, for calling for Koirala's resignation. Although Koirala beat back another challenge by Deuba's supporters at a party convention in January 2001, he resigned as Prime Minister on 19 July. Deuba then defeated Secretary General Sushil Koirala, 72–40, for the party leadership and was designated prime minister by the king.

In May 2002, the party's disciplinary committee expelled Deuba for failing to consult the party before seeking a parliamentary extension of the country's state of emergency. Deuba's supporters then expelled Koirala at a general convention in June. Deuba registered his faction as the Nepali Congress (Democratic), following a decision by the Election Commission that the Koirala faction held ownership of the name Nepali Congress, taking 37 central committee members and 40 of the party's lower house representatives with him.

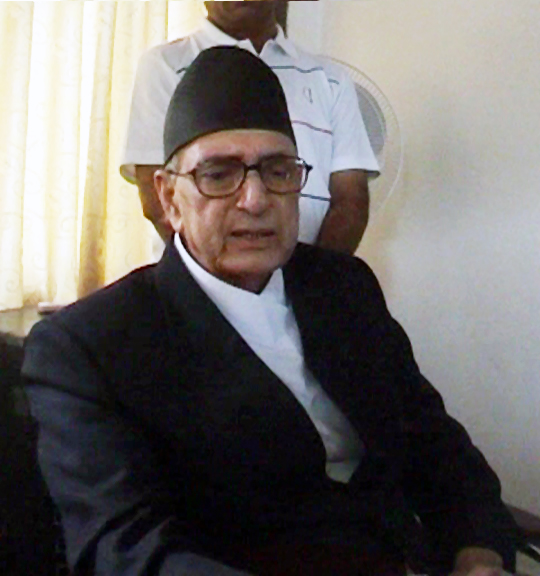
Girija Prasad Koirala, former party president and Prime Minister of Nepal

=== King Gyanendra's rule, 2002–2006 ===
In the months following the King's October 2002 decisions to dissolve the House of Representatives and replace Prime Minister Deuba with Rastriya Prajatantra's Lokendra Bahadur Chand, the party joined the CPN (UML) and other, smaller parties in challenging the constitutionality of the moves. The party played a significant role in the formation of the Seven Party Alliance (SPA), which launched a series of street protests against the King's regression. The Seven Party Alliance had earlier avoided the Communist Party of Nepal (Maoist) CPN-M and their violent methods, signed a 12-point understanding in Delhi in November 2005. The agreement contained three key commitmentsm, namely that the SPA endorsed CPN-M's fundamental demand for elections to a constituent assembly; the Maoists reciprocated with an assurance that they accepted a multi-party system, which was the SPA's prime concern. The SPA and the Maoists agreed to launch a peaceful mass movement against the monarchy.

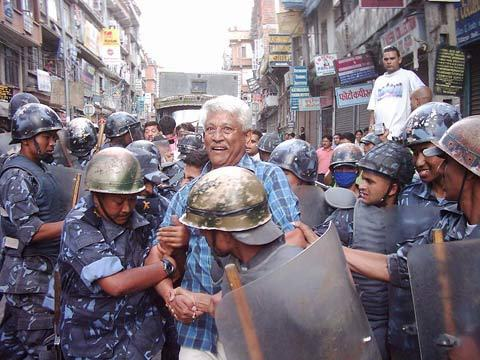
Former King Gyanendra arrested prominent leaders including the NC spokesperson Arjun Narasingha K.C.—shown above being taken to the central jail.

=== Constituent Assembly, 2006–2015 ===
On 26 April 2006, the king reinstated the dissolved parliament and formed a small government under the premiership of Girija Prasad Koirala, the president of the Nepali Congress. In November 2006, the government and the CPN-M signed a Comprehensive Peace Accord in India and the Nepalese Civil War formally ended.

On 24 September 2007, the Nepali Congress (Democratic) and Nepali Congress unified as a single party with the 2008 Constituent Assembly election looming. Following the first Madhesh movement, former deputy speaker and senior leader of the party Mahantha Thakur, who had led a committee that held talks with the Madheshi Jana Adhikar Forum, broke away and formed the Terai Madhesh Loktantrik Party with other Madheshi leaders. Girija Prasad Koirala remained president of the newly unified party. The party placed second with 110 out of 575 elected seats in the Constituent Assembly election, winning only half as many seats as CPN-M.

The party joined the coalition government headed by Madhav Kumar Nepal in May 2009. Girija Prasad Koirala angered some in the party by nominating his daughter Sujata Koirala to be Foreign Minister. In June, in a contested election for leader of the party's parliamentary group, Ram Chandra Poudel defeated Deuba. The 12th General Convention of the Nepali Congress was held in Kathmandu from 17 to 21 September 2010. The convention elected Sushil Koirala as the party president.

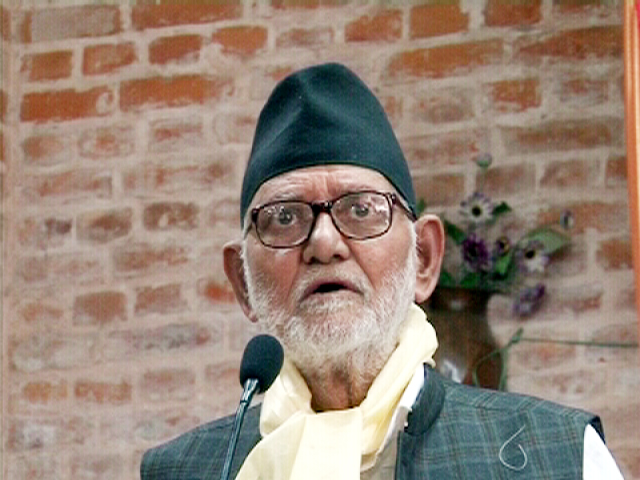
Sushil Koirala, former party president and Prime Minister of Nepal, also known as Father of Constitution in Nepal

After the Constituent Assembly of Nepal was dissolved by Prime Minister Baburam Bhattarai after failure to draft a new constitution before the deadline. In the resulting 2013 Constituent Assembly election, the party emerged as the largest party winning 196 of the 575 elected seats. Along with CPN (UML), under the leadership of Sushil Koirala, they formed a new coalition government. The new Constitution of Nepal was promulgated under his leadership on 20 September 2015.

=== Federal Nepal, 2015–2025 ===
A map showing the vote-share won by the Nepali Congress in the 2017 provincial elections

Sushil Koirala resigned as prime minister on 10 October 2015 after losing support from CPN (UML). Nepali Congress joined the government again in August 2016 under the leadership of Bimalendra Nidhi, after backing Pushpa Kamal Dahal to become prime minister. According to their agreement, Dahal resigned on 24 May 2017 paving the way for Deuba to become prime minister for a fourth time on 6 June 2017.

On 22 April 2017, the Akhanda Nepal Party led by Kumar Khadka joined the Nepali Congress ahead of the 2017 local elections. Nepali Congress won 11,456 seats including 266 mayoral or chairman positions. The party also won mayor posts in Lalitpur and Biratnagar. Ahead of the 2017 general and provincial elections, Nepal Loktantrik Forum led by former Nepali Congress leader, Bijay Kumar Gachhadar merged into the party. Similarly, a group from Federal Socialist Forum, Nepal led by MP Abhishek Pratap Shah, a group from CPN (UML) led by MP Mohar Singh Rathore and Rabin Chaudhary, a goroup from Rastriya Janata Party Nepal led by MP Jangi Lal Ray, a group from CPN (Maoist Centre) led by former Minister and MP Sambhu Lal Shrestha joined the party ahead of the 2017 election.

==== 2018–2022: 1st Federal Parliament ====
The party won 63 seats to the House of Representatives becoming the second largest party. The party could win only 23 seats under first past the post and many influential leaders including Ram Chandra Poudel, Ram Saran Mahat, Bimalendra Nidhi, Krishna Prasad Sitaula, and Arjun Narasingha K.C. lost in their constituencies. The party won 113 seats in provincial assemblies and became the largest opposition in six out of seven provinces. Following the 2018 National Assembly election, Deuba resigned as prime minister. Deuba was challenged for the leadership of the parliamentary party by Prakash Man Singh following a disappointing performance in the electionb but defeated his opponent 44–19.

Nepali Congress remained as the main opposition party until a split in the ruling Nepal Communist Party in 2021. The split occurred following an attempt to dissolve the House of Representatives. The party opposed the move and the decision was scrapped by the Supreme Court. Another attempt to dissolve the House of Representatives was quashed again by the Supreme Court and Nepali Congress president Sher Bahadur Deuba was appointed prime minister with the support of CPN (Maoist Centre) and CPN (Unified Socialist). The party also joined the provincial governments of Karnali, Province 2, Gandaki and Lumbini. The party headed governments in Gandaki and Karnali during this time.

The party held its 14th general convention from 13 to 15 December 2021. The party announced an active membership of 850,000 members and Sher Bahadur Deuba was re-elected as party president in the second round. The party elected Purna Bahadur Khadka and Dhanraj Gurung vice-presidents of the party, while Gagan Thapa and Bishwa Prakash Sharma were elected as general secretaries.

==== 2022–2025: 2nd Federal Parliament ====
The party contested the 2022 elections with an alliance with their coalition partners CPN (Maoist Centre), CPN (Unified Socialist) and other smaller leftist parties. In the 2022 local elections, the party won executive head positions in 329 local units including in the metropolitan cities of Lalitpur and Biratnagar. In the general elections that followed, the party won a plurality of seats in the House of Representatives and in provincial assemblies of Bagmati, Gandaki, Karnali and Sudurpaschim.

The resulting government saw Congress in the opposition again following a breakdown in the alliance. Another alliance change saw Congress joining the coalition government of CPN (Maoist Centre) in March 2023 before again joining the opposition bench in March 2024. The party forged a deal with CPN (UML) in July 2024 to form a new coalition government under CPN (UML).

The coalition government introduced a mandate to shut down social media for failing to register with the government which served as the trigger for the 2025 Gen Z protests. Following the death of 19 protestors as a result of the use of live ammunition, home minister Ramesh Lekhak from the party resigned, other ministers also resigned the next morning, but protestors vandalized the party headquarters and other local offices of the party across the country. Party president Sher Bahadur Deuba was assaulted at his residence along with his wife and foreign minister Arzu Rana Deuba. The houses of other leaders of the party were also vandalized and set ablaze. The government also resigned following the protests.

== Ideology ==
The party was founded on the principle of democracy and socialism. In 1956, the party adopted democratic socialism as its ideology for socioeconomic transformation. Its foreign policy orientation was to nonalignment and good relations with India. After the end of the panchayat, subsequent governments under Nepali Congress launched pro-privatisation and liberalisation policies in the 1990s.

== Organization ==
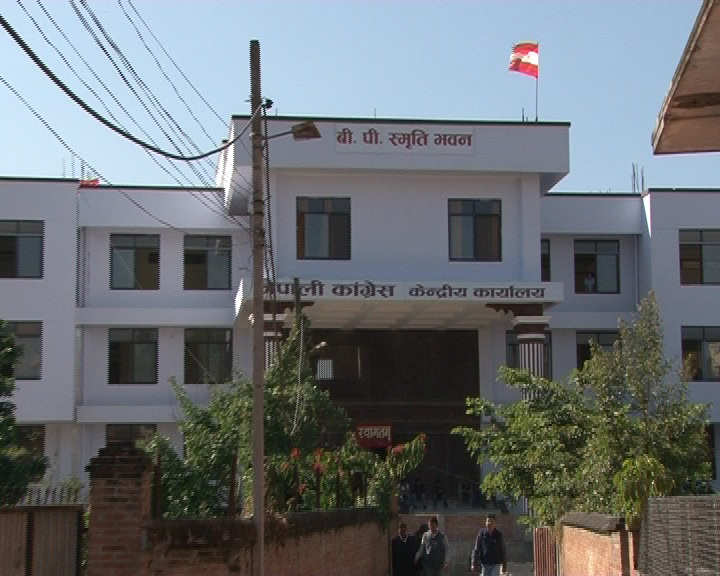
Party central office

=== Central Organization ===
The National Convention remains the supreme body of Nepali Congress and it is organized every four years by the party's Central Committee. The national convention elects the party portfolios including the party chair, two deputy chairs, two general secretaries each along with eight deputy general secretaries from different cluster. It also elects central committee members. The convention also discusses and approves political documents, organizational proposals and amendments to the party constitution. The party has also provision for Central Working committee.

=== Provincial and local organization ===
Party committees exist at the provincial, district, constituency, local and ward level. All the level of committee holds a convention every four years. The party has distributed a number of rights at different levels per the current Constitution of Nepal. Nepali Congress stands as the only party to have conducted conventions at all levels since the promulgation of current constitution of Nepal. The convention elects the leadership and members of the committee which is the supreme decision-making body in between conventions.

== Presence in legislatures ==
=== National legislatures ===
Legislature	Seats	Parliamentary Party leader
National Assembly	24 / 59	Kamala Panta
House of Representatives	38 / 275	Bhishma Raj Angdembe

=== Provincial legislatures ===
Legislature	Seats	Parliamentary Party leader
Koshi	29 / 93	Uddhav Thapa
Madhesh	22 / 107	Krishna Prasad Yadav
Bagmati	37 / 110	Bahadur Singh Lama
Gandaki	27 / 60	Surendra Raj Pandey
Lumbini	27 / 87	Dilli Bahadur Chaudhary
Karnali	15 / 40	Jeevan Bahadur Shahi
Sudurpashchim	19 / 53	Kamal Bahadur Shah

== Electoral performance ==
=== Legislative elections ===
Election	Leader	Constituency votes			Party list votes			Seats		Position	Resulting government
Election	Leader	No.	%	% change	No.	%	% change	No.	±	Position	Resulting government
1959	B. P. Koirala	666,898	37.20					74 / 109		1st	Government
1991	Krishna Prasad Bhattarai	2,742,452	37.75	▲0.55				110 / 205	▲36	1st	Government
1994	Girija Prasad Koirala	2,545,287	33.38	▼4.37				83 / 205	▼27	▼2nd	Opposition
1994	Girija Prasad Koirala	2,545,287	33.38	▼4.37				83 / 205	▼27	▼2nd	Leading coalition
1994	Girija Prasad Koirala	2,545,287	33.38	▼4.37				83 / 205	▼27	▼2nd	Opposition
1994	Girija Prasad Koirala	2,545,287	33.38	▼4.37				83 / 205	▼27	▼2nd	In coalition
1994	Girija Prasad Koirala	2,545,287	33.38	▼4.37				83 / 205	▼27	▼2nd	Leading coalition
1999	Krishna Prasad Bhattarai	3,214,068	37.29	▲3.91				111 / 205	▲28	▲1st	Government
2008	Girija Prasad Koirala	2,348,890	22.79	▼14.50	2,269,883	21.14		115 / 575	▲4	▼2nd	Opposition
2008	Girija Prasad Koirala	2,348,890	22.79	▼14.50	2,269,883	21.14		115 / 575	▲4	▼2nd	In coalition
2008	Girija Prasad Koirala	2,348,890	22.79	▼14.50	2,269,883	21.14		115 / 575	▲4	▼2nd	Opposition
2013	Sushil Koirala	2,694,983	29.80	▲7.01	2,418,370	25.55	▲4.41	196 / 575	▲81	▲1st	Leading coalition
2013	Sushil Koirala	2,694,983	29.80	▲7.01	2,418,370	25.55	▲4.41	196 / 575	▲81	▲1st	Opposition
2013	Sushil Koirala	2,694,983	29.80	▲7.01	2,418,370	25.55	▲4.41	196 / 575	▲81	▲1st	In coalition
2013	Sushil Koirala	2,694,983	29.80	▲7.01	2,418,370	25.55	▲4.41	196 / 575	▲81	▲1st	Leading coalition
2017	Sher Bahadur Deuba	3,590,793	35.75	▲5.95	3,128,389	32.78	▲7.23	63 / 275	▼133	▼2nd	Opposition
2017	Sher Bahadur Deuba	3,590,793	35.75	▲5.95	3,128,389	32.78	▲7.23	63 / 275	▼133	▼2nd	Leading coalition
2022	Sher Bahadur Deuba	2,431,907	23.19	▼12.56	2,715,225	25.71	▼7.07	89 / 275	▲26	▲1st	In coalition
2026	Gagan Thapa	2,008,639	19.08	▼4.11	1,759,172	16.24	▼9.47	38 / 275	▼51	▼2nd	Opposition

=== Provincial Assembly ===
Provincial Assembly	Election	Party list votes	%	Seats	+/–	Status
Koshi	2022	562,956	29.64 (#2)	29 / 93	▲8	In coalition
Madhesh	2022	400,144	19.18 (#1)	22 / 107	▲4	Leading coalition
Bagmati	2022	494,261	25.52 (#2)	37 / 110	▲16	Leading coalition
Gandaki	2022	349,628	35.47 (#2)	27 / 60	▲12	Leading coalition
Lumbini	2022	499,986	26.50 (#2)	27 / 87	▲8	In coalition
Karnali	2022	170,756	29.55 (#2)	14 / 53	▲8	In coalition
Sudurpashchim	2022	269,564	30.07 (#2)	18 / 53	▲8	Leading coalition

=== Local election ===
Election	Leader(s)	Council Head		Council Deputy		Councillors		Position
Election	Leader(s)	#	±	#	±	#	±	Position
2017	Sher Bahadur Deuba	266 / 753		223 / 753		11,454 / 35,038		2nd
2022	Sher Bahadur Deuba	329 / 753	▲59	301 / 753	▲77	13,730 / 35,011	▲2,274	▲1st

== Leadership ==
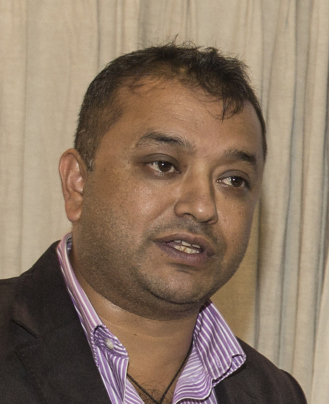
Gagan Thapa, party president

=== Presidents ===
- Matrika Prasad Koirala (1950–1952)
- B. P. Koirala (1952–1956, 1957–1982)
- Subarna Shamsher Rana (1956–1957)
- Krishna Prasad Bhattarai (1982–1996)
- Girija Prasad Koirala (1996–2010)
- Sushil Koirala (2010–2016)
- Sher Bahadur Deuba (2016–2026)
- Gagan Kumar Thapa (2026–present)

=== Senior Vice-presidents ===
- Bishwa Prakash Sharma (2026–present)

=== Vice-presidents ===
- Prakash Man Singh (1996–2010)
- Ram Chandra Paudel (1996–2016)
- Gopal Man Shrestha (1996–2010)
- Bimalendra Nidhi (2016–2022)
- Bijay Kumar Gachhadar (2017–2022)
- Dhanraj Gurung (2022–2026)
- Purna Bahadur Khadka (2022–2026)
- Bishwa Prakash Sharma (2026–2026)
- Pushpa Bhusal (2026–present)
- Chandra Bhandari (2026–present)
- Madhu Acharya (2026–present)
- Binod Chaudhary (2026–present)

=== General secretaries ===
- Girija Prasad Koirala (1982–1996)
- Mahendra Narayan Nidhi (1982–1996)
- Bimalendra Nidhi (1996–2010)
- Kul Bahadur Gurung (1996–2010)
- Ram Baran Yadav (1996–2010)
- Krishna Prasad Sitaula (2010–2016)
- Prakash Man Singh (2010–2016)
- Shashanka Koirala (2016–2022)
- Purna Bahadur Khadka (2016–2022)
- Gagan Kumar Thapa (2022-2026)
- Bishwa Prakash Sharma (2022–2026)
- Pradip Paudel (2026–present)
- Gururaj Ghimire (2026–2026)
- Udaya Shumsher Rana (2026–present)
- Dila Sangraula (2026–present)

=== Prime Ministers of Nepal ===
No.	Prime Minister	Portrait	Terms in Office			Legislature	Cabinet	Constituency
No.	Prime Minister	Portrait	Start	End	Tenure	Legislature	Cabinet	Constituency
1	Matrika Prasad Koirala		16 November 1951	14 August 1952	272 days	Appointed by King Tribhuvan	M.P. Koirala, 1951	None
2	Subarna Shamsher Rana (Note: As Chairman of the Council of Ministers)		15 May 1958	27 May 1959	1 year, 12 days	Appointed by King Mahendra	Subarna Rana, 1958	None
3	Bishweshwar Prasad Koirala		27 May 1959	26 December 1960	1 year, 213 days	1st House of Representatives	B.P. Koirala, 1959	Morang–Biratnagar West
4	Krishna Prasad Bhattarai		19 April 1990	26 May 1991	1 year, 37 days	Appointed by King Birendra	K.P. Bhattarai, 1990	None
4	Krishna Prasad Bhattarai		31 May 1999	22 March 2000	296 days	4th House of Representatives	K.P. Bhattarai, 1999	Parsa 1
5	Girija Prasad Koirala		26 May 1991	30 November 1994	3 years, 188 days	2nd House of Representatives	G.P. Koirala, 1991	Morang 1
5	Girija Prasad Koirala		15 April 1998	31 May 1999	1 year, 46 days	3rd House of Representatives	G.P. Koirala, 1998	Sunsari 5
5	Girija Prasad Koirala		22 March 2000	26 July 2001	1 year, 126 days	4th House of Representatives	G.P. Koirala, 2000	Sunsari 5
5	Girija Prasad Koirala		25 April 2006	28 May 2008	2 years, 33 days	Interim Legislature	G.P. Koirala, 2006	Sunsari 5
6	Sher Bahadur Deuba		12 September 1995	12 March 1997	1 year, 181 days	3rd House of Representatives	Deuba, 1995	Dadeldhura 1
6	Sher Bahadur Deuba		26 July 2001	4 October 2002	1 year, 70 days	4th House of Representatives	Deuba, 2001	Dadeldhura 1
6	Sher Bahadur Deuba		7 June 2017	15 February 2018	253 days	2nd Constituent Assembly	Deuba, 2017	Dadeldhura 1
6	Sher Bahadur Deuba		13 July 2021	26 December 2022	1 year, 166 days	1st Federal Parliament	Deuba, 2021	Dadeldhura 1
7	Sushil Koirala		11 February 2014	12 October 2015	1 year, 243 days	2nd Constituent Assembly	Sushil Koirala, 2013	Banke 3

=== List of Deputy Prime Ministers ===
No.	Deputy PM	Portrait	Term in office			Assembly	Constituency	Prime Minister
No.	Deputy PM	Portrait	Start	End	Tenure	Assembly	Constituency	Prime Minister
1	Shailaja Acharya		15 April 1998	31 May 1999	1 year, 46 days	3rd House of Representatives	Morang 5	Girija Prasad Koirala
2	Ram Chandra Paudel		21 March 2000	13 July 2001	1 year, 114 days	4th House of Representatives	Tanahun 2	Girija Prasad Koirala
3	Sujata Koirala		12 October 2009	6 February 2011	1 year, 117 days	1st Constituent Assembly	Party list	Madhav Kumar Nepal
4	Krishna Prasad Sitaula (Note: On 5 May 2012, Prime Minister Baburam Bhattarai appointed Krishna Prasad Sitaula as Minister without Portfolio upon the recommendation of Nepali Congress President Sushil Koirala.)		6 May 2012	29 May 2012	23 days	1st Constituent Assembly	None (Note: At the time of his appointment in May 2012, Sitaula was not a member of the Constituent Assembly and therefore did not represent a constituency seat.)	Baburam Bhattarai
5	Prakash Man Singh		25 February 2014	12 October 2015	1 year, 229 days	2nd Constituent Assembly	Kathmandu 1	Sushil Koirala
5	Prakash Man Singh		15 July 2024	9 September 2025	1 year, 56 days	2nd Federal Parliament	Kathmandu 1	K. P. Sharma Oli
6	Bimalendra Nidhi		4 August 2016	7 June 2017	307 days	Legislature Parliament	Dhanusha 3	Pushpa Kamal Dahal
7	Gopal Man Shrestha		7 June 2017	15 February 2018	253 days	Legislature Parliament	Party list	Sher Bahadur Deuba
8	Purna Bahadur Khadka		31 March 2023	4 March 2024	339 days	2nd Federal Parliament	Surkhet 1	Pushpa Kamal Dahal

=== Chief Ministers ===
==== Koshi Province ====
No.	Chief Minister	Portrait	Terms in Office			Legislature	Cabinet	Constituency
No.	Chief Minister	Portrait	Start	End	Tenure	Legislature	Cabinet	Constituency
1	Uddhav Thapa		7 July 2023	2 August 2023	26 days	2nd Assembly	Thapa I	List MP
1	Uddhav Thapa		2 August 2023	8 September 2023	37 days	2nd Assembly	Thapa II	List MP
2	Kedar Karki		14 October 2023	9 May 2024	207 days	2nd Assembly	Karki	Morang 6 (B)

==== Madhesh Province ====
No.	Chief Minister	Portrait	Terms in Office			Legislature	Cabinet	Constituency
No.	Chief Minister	Portrait	Start	End	Tenure	Legislature	Cabinet	Constituency
1	Krishna Prasad Yadav		5 December 2025	Incumbent	339 days	2nd Assembly	Yadav	Rautahat 1(B)

==== Bagmati Province ====
No.	Chief Minister	Portrait	Terms in Office			Legislature	Cabinet	Constituency
No.	Chief Minister	Portrait	Start	End	Tenure	Legislature	Cabinet	Constituency
1	Bahadur Singh Lama		24 July 2024	4 August 2025	1 year, 10 days	2nd Assembly	Lama	Nuwakot 2(B)
2	Indra Bahadur Baniya		5 August 2025	17 August 2026	1 year, 12 days	2nd Assembly	Baniya	Makwanpur 2 (B)

==== Gandaki Province ====
No.	Chief Minister	Portrait	Terms in Office			Legislature	Cabinet	Constituency
No.	Chief Minister	Portrait	Start	End	Tenure	Legislature	Cabinet	Constituency
1	Krishna Chandra Nepali		12 June 2021	9 January 2023	1 year, 211 days	1st Assembly	Nepali	Nawalparasi East 1(A)
2	Surendra Raj Pandey		27 April 2023	4 April 2024	343 days	2nd Assembly	Pandey I	Gorkha 2(B)
2	Surendra Raj Pandey		29 May 2024	Incumbent	2 years, 164 days	2nd Assembly	Pandey II	Gorkha 2(B)

==== Lumbini Province ====
No.	Chief Minister	Portrait	Terms in Office			Legislature	Cabinet	Constituency
No.	Chief Minister	Portrait	Start	End	Tenure	Legislature	Cabinet	Constituency
1	Dilli Bahadur Chaudhary		27 April 2023	4 April 2024	343 days	1st Assembly	Chaudhary	Dang 3(A)

==== Karnali Province ====
No.	Chief Minister	Portrait	Terms in Office			Legislature	Cabinet	Constituency
No.	Chief Minister	Portrait	Start	End	Tenure	Legislature	Cabinet	Constituency
1	Jeevan Bahadur Shahi		2 November 2021	12 January 2023	1 year, 71 days	1st Assembly	Shahi	Humla 1(B)

==== Sudurpashchim Province ====
No.	Chief Minister	Portrait	Terms in Office			Legislature	Cabinet	Constituency
No.	Chief Minister	Portrait	Start	End	Tenure	Legislature	Cabinet	Constituency
1	Kamal Bahadur Shah		12 February 2023	4 April 2024	1 year, 52 days	2nd Assembly	Shah I	Kailali 2(A)
1	Kamal Bahadur Shah		5 August 2024	13 August 2026	2 years, 8 days	2nd Assembly	Shah II	Kailali 2(A)

== Sister organizations ==
According to the website of Nepali Congress, the following are its sister organizations.

- Nepal Student Union (नेपाल विद्यार्थी संघ)
- Nepal Tarun Dal (नेपाल तरुण दल)
- Nepal Democratic Fighter Society (नेपाल प्रजातान्त्रिक सेनानी समाज)
- Nepal Farmers Association (नेपाल किसान संघ)
- Nepal Adivasi Janajati Sangh (नेपाल आदिवासी जनजाति संघ)
- National Democratic Handicapped Association (राष्ट्रिय प्रजातान्त्रिक अपाङ्ग संघ)
- Nepal Tamang Association (नेपाल तामाङ संघ)
- Nepal Thakur Society (नेपाल ठाकुर समाज)
- Nepal Woman Association (नेपाल महिला संघ)
- Nepal Dalit Sangh (नेपाल दलित संघ)
- Nepal Ex Army Association (नेपाल भूतपूर्व सैनिक संघ)
- Nepal Press Union (नेपाल प्रेस युनियन)
- Nepal Civil Service Employees' Union (नेपाल निजामती कर्मचारी युनियन)
- Nepal Cultural Association (नेपाल सांस्कृतिक संघ)
- Nepal Teachers Association (नेपाल शिक्षक संघ)
- Nepal Trade Union Congress (नेपाल ट्रेड युनियन कांग्रेस)
- Nepal Prajatantra Senani Sangh (नेपाल प्रजातान्त्रिक सेनानी संघ)
- Nepal Indigenous Nationality Association (नेपाल आदिवासी जनजाती संघ )

== See also ==
- Biratnagar jute mill strike
- Congress Mukti Sena
- 15th general convention of Nepali Congress
