= 14th general convention of Nepali Congress =

2022 internal election of Nepali Congress

14th General Convention of Nepali Congress
- 13–15 December 2021

50% + 1 votes needed to avoid a runoff
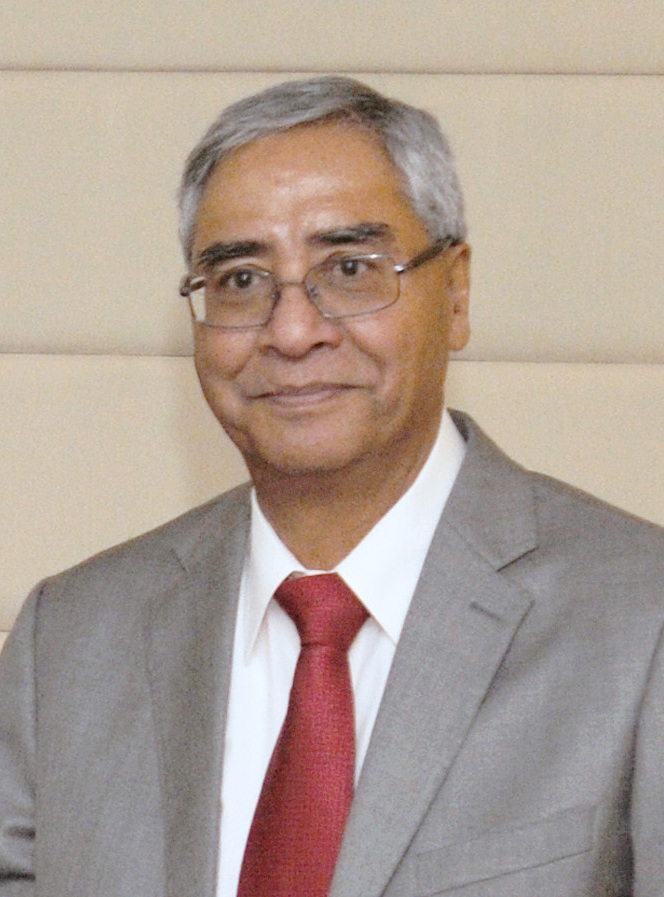

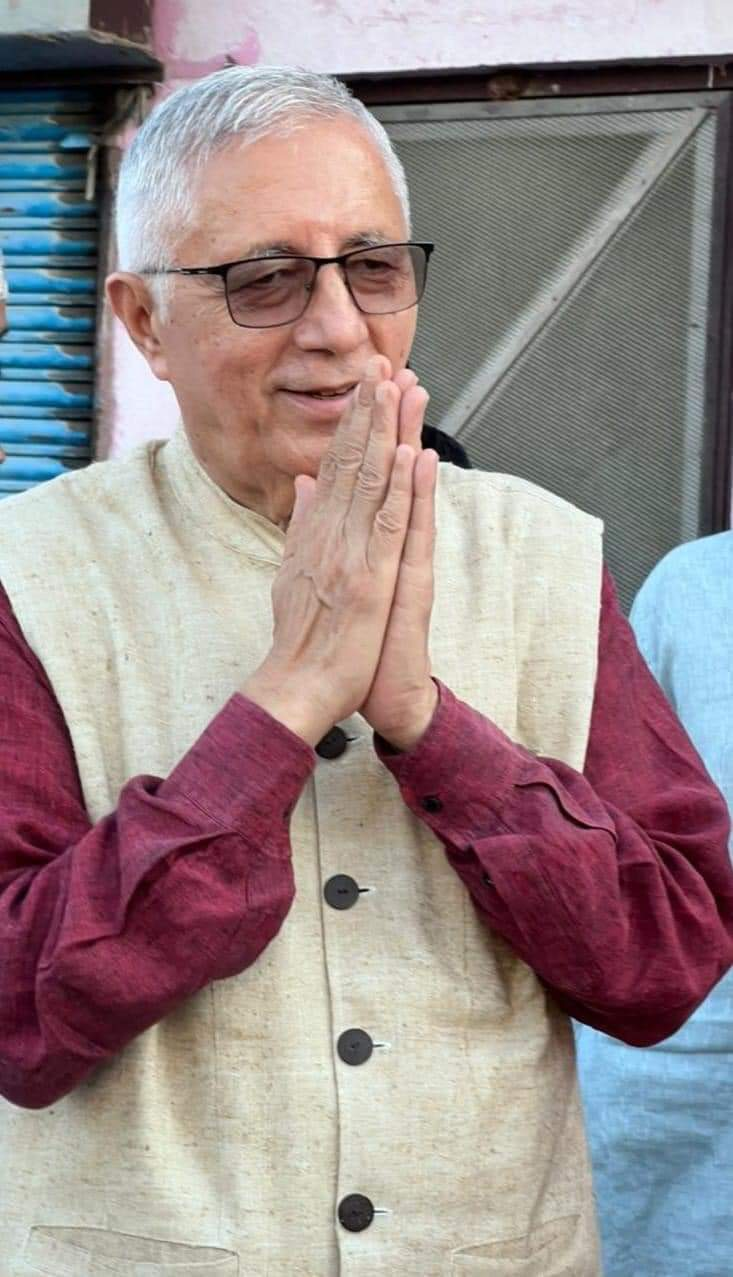

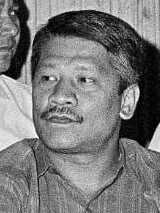

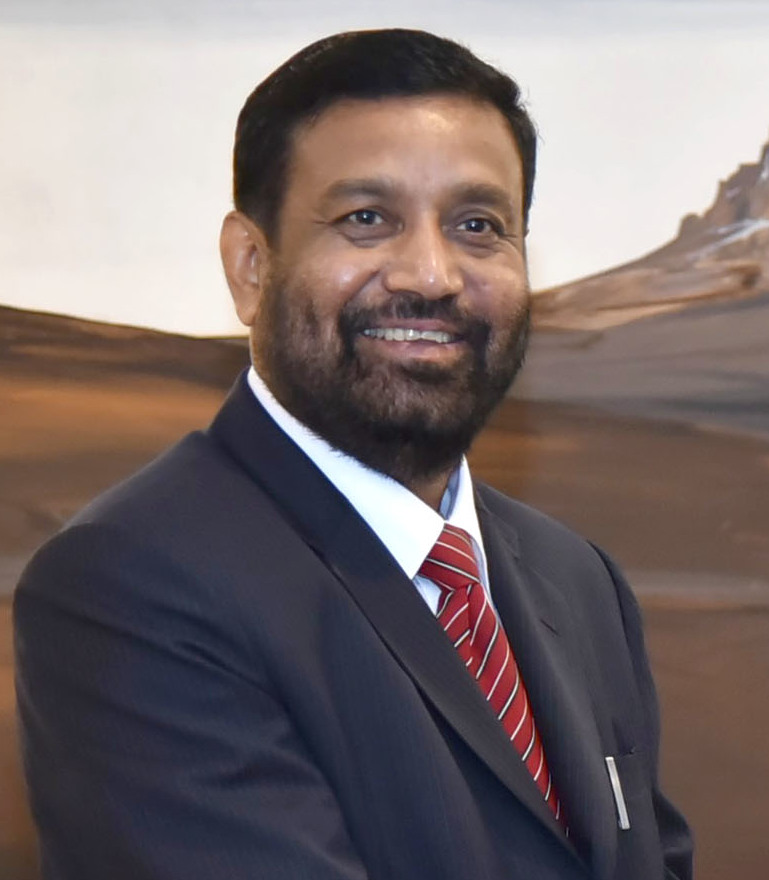

Candidate	Sher Bahadur Deuba	Shekhar Koirala
First Round	2,258 (48.3%)	1,702 (36.4%)
Runoff	2,733 (59.1%)	1,855 (40.1%)
Candidate	Prakash Man Singh	Bimalendra Nidhi	Kalyan Gurung
First Round	371 (7.9%)	250 (5.3%)	22 (0.5%)
Runoff	Eliminated	Eliminated	Eliminated
President before election
Sher Bahadur Deuba
Elected President
Sher Bahadur Deuba

The 14th General Convention of the Nepali Congress, was a national convention of Nepali Congress in which delegates of the party re-elected Sher Bahadur Deuba as party president, it was held in 13–15 December 2021, at Bhrikuti Mandap, Kathmandu. Similarly, the convention of the six Province was held from 2–3 December. The convention of the Pradesh 2 was delayed and held after National Convention on 22–23 December 2021.

Nearly 850,000 active members of the party throughout the country took part in this occasion from ward to national level. The total of 4,783 delegates were elected from 165 constituencies- which in turn voted to elect central level portfolios.

== Central Committee Portfolio Election ==
=== 2nd Round for Party President ===
Candidate's Name	Support	Votes		Percentage	Result	Reference
Candidate's Name	Support	Obtained	Total	Percentage	Result	Reference
Sher Bahadur Deuba	Deuba-Nidhi-Singh-Sitaula	2733	4623	59.12%	Elected	
Shekhar Koirala	Koirala-KC-Thapa	1855	4623	40.13%		

=== 1st Round for Party President ===
Candidate's Name	Pannel	Votes		Percentage	Result	Reference
Candidate's Name	Pannel	Obtained	Total	Percentage	Result	Reference
Sher Bahadur Deuba	Deuba-Sitaula	2258	4679	48.25	Round 2	In 2nd round for not crossing 50%(+1) votes.
Shekhar Koirala	Koirala-KC-Thapa	1702	4679	36.37	Round 2	In 2nd round for not crossing 50%(+1) votes.
Prakash Man Singh	Singh	371	4679	7.92		In 2nd round for not crossing 50%(+1) votes.
Bimalendra Nidhi	Nidhi	250	4679	5.34		In 2nd round for not crossing 50%(+1) votes.
Kalyan Gurung	Independent	22	4679	0.47		In 2nd round for not crossing 50%(+1) votes.

=== Party Portfolios ===
Candidate's Name		Pannel	Votes		Percentage	Result	Reference
Candidate's Name		Pannel	Obtained	Total	Percentage	Result	Reference
Vice-president (2)							
Dibeshwory Shah		Nidhi	132	4679	2.82		
Mahesh Acharya		Independent	589	4679	12.58		
Sujata Koirala		Singh	644	4679	13.76		
Chandra Bhandari		Koirala	1580	4679	33.76		
Dhanraj Gurung		Koirala	1908	4679	40.77	Elected	
Purna Bahadur Khadka		Deuba	2121	4679	45.33	Elected	
Bijay Kumar Gachhadar		Deuba	1906	4679	40.73		
General Secretary (2)
Raja Ram Karki		Nidhi	106	4682	2.26		
Bishwa Prakash Sharma		Singh	1984	4682	42.38	Elected	
Gagan Thapa		Koirala	3023	4682	64.57	Elected	
Minendra Rijal		Koirala	809	4682	17.28		
Prakash Sharan Mahat		Deuba	1556	4682	33.23		
Pradip Paudel		Deuba	1393	4682	29.75		
Quota	Deputy General Secretary (8)						
Khas Arya	Devraj Chalise	Koirala	2059	4635	44.43		
Khas Arya	Kishore Singh Rathore	Deuba	2576	4635	55.57	Elected	
Madhesi	Ram Krishna Yadav	Koirala-Nidhi	1820	4622	39.37		
Madhesi	Ranjit Karna	Independent	472	4622	10.21		
Madhesi	Mahendra Yadav	Deuba	2330	4622	50.41	Elected	
Tharu	Teju Lal Chaudhary	Koirala	1877	4639	40.46		
Tharu	Uma Kant Chaudhary	Deuba	2762	4639	59.63	Elected	
Women	Kamala Panta	Koirala	2105	4638	45.39		
Women	Dina Upadhyaya	Deuba	2533	4638	54.61	Elected	
Adibasi Janajati	Bikash Lama	Koirala	1913	4681	40.87		
Adibasi Janajati	Bhishma Raj Angdembe	Deuba	2711	4681	57.92	Elected	
Dalit	Jiwan Pariyar	Koirala	2215	4670	47.43	Elected	
Dalit	Man Bahadur Bishwakarma	Deuba	2175	4670	46.57		
Dalit	Ganga Sunuwar	Nidhi	229	4670	4.90		
Muslim	Shekh Wakil	Koirala	1871	4647	40.26		
Muslim	Farmulla Mansur	Deuba	2776	4647	59.73	Elected	
Backwarded area	Badri Pandey	Koirala	2411	4643	51.92	Elected	
Backwarded area	Chetraj Bajal	Nidhi	99	4643	2.13		
Backwarded area	Jeevan Bahadur Shahi	Deuba	2133	4643	45.94		

== Surveys and opinion polls ==
Date	News agency	Shekhar Koirala	Sher Bahadur Deuba	Prakash Man Singh	Bimalendra Nidhi	Kalyan Gurung	Result
13 December 2021	Ekagaj	24%	41%	19%	14%	2.0%	Hung

== Central Committee Members ==
As per the constitution of the party, 35 people shall be elected under open category, 9 under women, 21 from provinces at the rate of 3 from each, 9 from Dalit, 15 from Adivasi Janajati, 13 from Khas Arya, 9 from Madheshi, 4 from women, 3 women from central members and 3 women members.

SN	Elected Central working committee members (167)	
SN	Open Category (35)	Votes
1	Shashanka Koirala	3836
2	Narayan Prakash Saud	2937
3	Bal Krishna Khand	2879
4	Udaya Shumsher Rana	2843
5	Ram Hari Khatiwada	2823
6	Gyanendra Bahadur Karki	2820
7	Ramesh Lekhak	2780
8	Shankar Bhandari	2762
9	Jeep Tshering Lama	2702
10	Arjun Narasingha K.C.	2650
11	Jit Jung Basnet	2557
12	Gopal Man Shrestha	2538
13	Mohan Bahadur Basnet	2476
14	Sunil Bahadur Thapa	2472
15	Nain Singh Mahar	2467
16	Dilendra Prasad Badu	2441
17	Ram Saran Mahat	2434
18	Bal Bahadur K.C.	2388
19	Govinda Bhattarai	2350
20	Kundan Raj Kafle	2279
21	Deepak Giri	2265
22	Surendra Raj Pandey	2201
23	Padma Narayan Chaudhary	2038
24	Rajeev Dhungana	1896
25	Guru Baral	1870
26	Sanjay Kumar Gautam	1867
27	Govinda Raj Pokharel	1843
28	Madan Bahadur Amatya	1830
29	Ajaya Babu Shiwakoti	1811
30	Ganesh Lama	1782
31	Dinesh Koirala	1781
32	Umesh Jung Rayamajhi	1776
33	Mohan Acharya	1751
34	Gopal Dahit	1710
35	Krishna Kishor Ghimire	1707
Women (9)
1	Dila Sangraula	2885
2	Puspa Bhusal	2718
3	Arzu Rana Deuba	2536
4	Ambika Basnet	2339
5	Ishwari Neupane	2259
6	Sarita Prasai	2096
7	Rama Koirala Paudel	1885
8	Sushila Dhakal	1804
9	Rangmati Shahi	1789
Khas Arya (13; 7 Open + 6 Women)
1	Manju Khand	2181
2	Keshav Kumar Budhathoki	2115
3	Gobinda Bahadur Shah	2073
4	Nanu Bastola	2001
5	Bhim Parajuli	1947
6	Shyam Sundar Ghimire	1919
7	Champa Devi Khadka	1906
8	Pratima Gautam	1891
9	Madhu Prasad Acharya	1849
10	Narayan Bahadur Karki	1836
11	Kantika Sejuwal	1885
12	Gehendra Giri	1803
13	Bidya Devi Timalsina	1825
Madheshi (9; 5 Open + 4 Women)
1	Mukta Kumari Yadav	3969
2	Minakshi Jha	3012
3	Manju Kumari Yadav	2883
4	Nagina Yadav	2846
5	Ajay Chaurasiya	2522
6	Binod Chaudhary	2206
7	Chandra Mohan Yadav	2138
8	Mahendra Kumar Raya	1984
9	Dinesh Kumar Yadav	1959
Dalit (9; 5 Open + 4 Women)
1	Laxmi Pariyar	2418
2	Sujata Pariyar	2381
3	Man Bahadur Nepali	2240
4	Prakash Rasaili	2226
5	Hari Sharan Nepali	2051
6	Shanti Pariyar BK	2196
7	Nrip Bahadur Wad	2195
8	Rupa BK	2013
9	Maikulal Balmiki	1892
Adhibasi Janajati (15; 8 Open + 7 Women)
1	Chin Kaji Shrestha	2308
2	Sita Gurung	2307
3	Umesh Shrestha	2144
4	Anjani Shrestha	2124
5	Bahadur Singh (Lama) Tamang	2114
6	Saraswati Bajimaya	2048
7	Dilman Pakhrin	1976
8	Tek Bahadur Gurung	1906
9	Ang Gelu Sherpa	1898
10	Tara Man Gurung	1848
11	Maya Rai	1873
12	Ganga Laxmi Awal	1857
13	Sita Kumari Rana	1835
14	Sushila Thing	1795
15	Tek Prasad Gurung	1778
Tharu (4)
1	Kalpana Chaudhary	2524
2	Ram Janam Chaudhary	2422
3	Jeevan Rana	2349
4	Yogendra Chaudhary	2160
Muslim (3; 2 Open+1 Women)
1	Abdul Razak	2390
2	Abdul Satar	2228
3	Javed Khatun	1900
Backwarded area (1)
1	Arjun Jang Bahadur Singh	2577
Minority (1)
1	Pradeep Kumar Sunuwar	2171
Disabled (1)
1	Madan Krishna Shrestha	1640

=== Province category ===
Provinces (21)
Koshi	Madhesh	Bagmati	Gandaki	Lumbini	Karnali	Sudurpaschim
Mahendra Kumari Limbu	Chitra Lekha Yadav	Urmila Nepal KC	Saraswati Aryal Tiwari	Shila Sharma Khadka	Janaki Singh	Sushila Mishra Bhatta
Amrit Aryal	Ramesh Rijal	Rajan KC	Krishna Chandra Nepali Pokharel	Devendra Raj Kandel	Karna Bahadur Budha	Dr. Rana Bahadur Rawal
Rajeev Koirala	Ananda Prasad Dhungana	Dhyan Govinda Ranjit	Dhrub Wagle	Chandra Bahadur KC	Rajeev Bikram Shah	Yagya Raj Joshi

=== Nominated ===
SN	Nominated (33)	District	Date of nomination	Note
1	Ram Chandra Paudel	Tanahun	1 January 2022	Resigned
2	Prakash Man Singh	Kathmandu	1 January 2022	
3	Bimalendra Nidhi	Dhanusha	1 January 2022	
4	Bijay Kumar Gachhadar	Sunsari	1 January 2022	
5	Krishna Prasad Sitaula	Jhapa	1 January 2022	
6	Prakash Sharan Mahat	Nuwakot	1 January 2022	
7	Narayan Khadka	Udayapur	1 January 2022	
8	Uma Regmi	Chitwan	1 January 2022	
9	Sujata Koirala	Morang	1 January 2022	
10	Min Bahadur Bishwakarma	Sunsari	1 January 2022	
11	Jeevan Bahadur Shahi	Humla	2 January 2022	
12	Pradip Paudel	Tanahun	2 January 2022	
13	Kalyan Gurung		2 January 2022	
14	Kiran Yadav	Mahottari	16 August 2022	
15	Radha Ghale	Kathmandu	16 August 2022	
16	Dhana Khatiwada	Lalitpur	16 August 2022	
17	Sita Thapaliya (Urmila)	Dhading	16 August 2022	
18	Rukmini Koirala	Morang	16 August 2022	
19	Kalyani Rijal	Kathmandu	16 August 2022	
20	Goma Bhattarai	Jhapa	16 August 2022	
21	Ganga Shahi	Rupandehi	16 August 2022	
22	Laxmi Khatiwada	Sunsari	16 August 2022	
23	Sita Devkota	Nawalpur	16 August 2022	
24	Minendra Rijal	Morang	5 May 2023	
25	Man Bahadur Bishwakarma	Arghakhanchi	21 September 2023	
26	Arjun Prasad Joshi	Parbat	21 September 2023	
27	Dr. Chandra Bhandari	Gulmi	21 September 2023	
28	Shiva Prasad Humagain	Kavre	21 September 2023	
29	Kiran Raj Sharma Paudel	Baglung	21 September 2023	
30	Bharat Kumar Shah	Rupandehi	21 September 2023	
31	Sharada Paudel	Kaski	21 September 2023	
32	Anil Kumar Rungata	Parsa	21 September 2023	

== Members of Central Executive Committee ==
On 28 January 2022, NC president Sher Bahadur Deuba formed Central Executive Committee which was approved by central committee.

SN	Office Holder (37)
1	Sher Bahadur Deuba
2	Purna Bahadur Khadka
3	Dhanraj Gurung
4	Gagan Thapa
5	Bishwa Prakash Sharma
6	Farmullah Mansoor
7	Umakanta Chaudhary
8	Maha Laxmi Upadhyaya
9	Bhishma Raj Angdembe
10	Mahendra Yadav
11	Kishore Singh Rathore
12	Badri Pandey
13	Jiwan Pariyar
14	Ram Chandra Paudel
15	Gopal Man Shrestha
16	Prakash Man Singh
17	Bimalendra Nidhi
18	Bijay Kumar Gachhadar
19	Krishna Prasad Sitaula
20	Shashanka Koirala
21	Chitra Lekha Yadav
22	Ram Sharan Mahat
23	Arjun Narasingha K.C.
24	Prakash Sharan Mahat
25	Shekhar Koirala
26	Sunil Bahadur Thapa
27	Bal Bahadur K.C.
28	Bal Krishna Khand
29	Gyanendra Bahadur Karki
30	Uma Regmi
31	Ramesh Rijal
32	Narayan Khadka
33	Jeep Tshering Lama
34	Sujata Koirala
35	Narayan Prakash Saud
36	Jeevan Bahadur Shahi
37	Ananda Prasad Dhungana

== Provincial portfolio election ==
Province	Name	Supporting pannel	Votes		Percentage	Result	Quota	Reference
Province	Name	Supporting pannel	obtained	Total	Percentage	Result	Quota	Reference
President (1)								
Province No. 1	Uddhav Thapa	Sitaula-Deuba	844	1686	50.06	Won	Open	
Province No. 1	Guru Ghimire	Koirala	842	1686	49.94	Lost	Open	
Madhesh	Ram Saroj Yadav	Nidhi-Gagan-Koirala	855	1879	45.50	Lost	Open	
Madhesh	Krishna Yadav	Deuba	996	1879	53.01	Won	Open	
Bagmati Province	Indra Baniya	Deuba	1085	2025	53.5	Won	Open	
Bagmati Province	Jagadishwar Narasingha KC	Koirala	927	2025	46.5	Lost	Open	
Gandaki Province	Shukra Raj Sharma	Koirala	612	1140	53.68	Won	Open	
Gandaki Province	Arjun Joshi	Deuba	528	1140	46.32	Lost	Open	
Lumbini Province	Amar Singh Pun	Koirala	852	1519	56.08	Won	Open	
Lumbini Province	Bharat Kumar Shah	Deuba	667	1519	43.92	Lost	Open	
Karnali Province	Lalit Jung Shahi	Deuba	422	800	52.75	Won	Open	
Karnali Province	Motiraj Bam	Nidhi	7	800	1	Lost	Open	
Karnali Province	Bhupendra Jung Shahi	Koirala	371	800	46.25	Lost	Open	
Sudurpashchim Province	Bir Bahadur Balayar	Deuba	553	782	70.72	Won	Open	
Sudurpashchim Province	Narayan Mishra	Koirala	229	782	29.28	Lost	Open	
Vice president (2)
Province No. 1	Ramesh Jung Rayamajhi	Deuba	890	1600	55.62	Won	Open	
Province No. 1	Tanka Rai	Deuba	847	1600	52.93	Won	Open	
Province No. 1	Bishwanath Rijal	Koirala	699	1600	31.18	Lost	Open	
Province No. 1	Govind Dhungana	Koirala	765	1600	47.81	Lost	Open	
Madhesh	Dhan Lal Thokkar	Nidhi-Gagan-Koirala	636			Lost	Open	
Madhesh	Binod Kumar Khanal	Nidhi-Gagan-Koirala	740			Lost	Open	
Madhesh	Birendra Singh	Deuba	1019			Won	Open	
Madhesh	Chandra Shekhar Yadav	Deuba	895			Won	Open	
Bagmati Province	Chandra Maharjan	Deuba	1037	2069	50.12	Won	Open	
Bagmati Province	Dharmaraj Gautam	Deuba	1004	2069	48.52	Lost	Open	
Bagmati Province	Mohan Basnet	Koirala	1059	2069	51.18	Won	Open	
Bagmati Province	Rajendra Burlakoti	Koirala	837	2069	40.4	Lost	Open	
Gandaki Province	Kalpana Tiwari	Koirala	624	1092	57.14	Won	Open	
Gandaki Province	Hari Prasad Shrestha	Koirala	548	1092	50.18	Lost	Open	
Gandaki Province	Mekhlal Shrestha	Deuba	556	1092	50.91	Won	Open	
Gandaki Province	Netra Mahat	Deuba	456	1092	41.75	Lost	Open	
Lumbini Province	Bhuwan Shrestha	Koirala	847	1536	51.8	Won	Open	
Lumbini Province	Ashta Bhuja Pathak	Koirala	772	1536	47.21	Lost	Open	
Lumbini Province	Raju Khanal	Deuba	792	1536	48.44	Won	Open	
Lumbini Province	Sudhakar Pandey	Deuba	661	1536	40.42	Lost	Open	
Karnali Province	Kali Bahadur Sahakari	Deuba	457	800	57.12	Won	Open	
Karnali Province	Sanat Kumari Karki	Deuba	443	800	55.37	Won	Open	
Karnali Province	Debendra Bahadur Shahi	Koirala	385	800	48.19	Lost	Open	
Karnali Province	Tilak Bahadur Bhandari	Koirala	315	800	39.38	Lost	Open	
Sudurpashchim Province	Gopal Gurung	Koirala	229	782	29.28	Lost	Open	
Sudurpashchim Province	Man Bahadur Rawal	Koirala	218	782	27.88	Lost	Open	
Sudurpashchim Province	Him Bahadur Rawal	Nidhi	92	782	11.76	Lost	Open	
Sudurpashchim Province	Janak Chaudhary	Deuba	486	782	62.14	Won	Open	
Sudurpashchim Province	Lokraj Awasthi	Deuba	427	782	54.6	Won	Open	
General Secretary (2)
Province No. 1	Bhupendra Rai	Deuba	824	1609	51.21	Won	Open	
Province No. 1	Padmasundara Palungwa	Deuba	807	1609	50.15	Lost	Open	
Province No. 1	Umesh Thapa	Koirala	823	1609	51.14	Won	Open	
Province No. 1	Dipen Shrestha	Koirala	764	1609	47.48	Lost	Open	
Madhesh	Binod Chaudhary	Independent	195				Open	
Madhesh	Naresh Kumar Yadav	Nidhi-Gagan-Koirala	775				Open	
Madhesh	Haresh Mahato	Nidhi-Gagan-Koirala	703				Open	
Madhesh	Upendra Kumar Yadav	Deuba	959			Won	Open	
Madhesh	Brihaspati Krishna Shrestha	Deuba	788			Won	Open	
Bagmati Province	Raju Shrestha	Deuba	910	2069	43.98	Won	Open	
Bagmati Province	Tilak Ruwali	Deuba	760	2069	36.73	Lost	Open	
Bagmati Province	Ram Chandra Aryal "Michael"	Koirala	899	2069	43.45	Lost	Open	
Bagmati Province	Kanchan Chandra Bade	Koirala	995	2069	48.09	Won	Open	
Bagmati Province	Gauri Parasd Dawadi	Nidhi	188	2069	9.08	Lost	Open	
Bagmati Province	Suresh Shrestha	Nidhi	163	2069	7.87	Lost	Open	
Gandaki Province	Bishnu Lamichhane	Koirala	567	1085	52.25	Won	Open	
Gandaki Province	Kiran Babu Shrestha	Koirala	573	1085	52.81	Won	Open	
Gandaki Province	Kumar Khadka	Deuba	556	1085	51.24	Lost	Open	
Gandaki Province	Ishwar Pandey	Deuba	473	1085	43.59	Lost	Open	
Lumbini Province	Bikram Khanal	Koirala	844	1520	55.56	Won	Open	
Lumbini Province	Surendraraj Acharya	Koirala	839	1520	55.2	Won	Open	
Lumbini Province	Janmajay Timalsina	Deuba	706	1520	46.44	Lost	Open	
Lumbini Province	Khiman Singh Rayamajhi	Deuba	651	1520	42.82	Lost	Open	
Karnali Province	Niranjan KC	Deuba	425	800	53.125	Won	Open	
Karnali Province	Krishna Kumar Rokaya	Deuba	423	800	52.875	Won	Open	
Karnali Province	Govinda Bahadur Koirala	Nidhi	55	800	6.875	Lost	Open	
Karnali Province	Krishna Bahadur BC	Koirala	313	800	39.13	Lost	Open	
Karnali Province	Khagendra Bahadur Malla	Koirala	384	800	48.00	Lost	Open	
Sudurpashchim Province	Naranarayana (Manu) Sah	Deuba	511	782	65.34	Won	Open	
Sudurpashchim Province	Meghraj Khadka	Deuba	519	782	66.36	Won	Open	
Sudurpashchim Province	Pratap Gurdami	Koirala	178	782	22.76	Lost	Open	
Sudurpashchim Province	Ram Bahadur Shahi	Koirala	256	782	32.73	Lost	Open	
Deputy General Secretary (3)
Province No. 1	Khadga Bahadur Phago	Deuba	1026	1605	63.92	Won	Open	
Province No. 1	Binod Kumar Basnet	Deuba	747	1605	46.54	Won	Open	
Province No. 1	Rohit Kumar Sah	Koirala	665	1605	41.37	Lost	Open	
Province No. 1	Birkaji Rai	Koirala	647	1605	40.31	Lost	Open	
Province No. 1	Subhash Chandra Rai	Nidhi	125	1605	7.78	Lost	Open	
Province No. 1	Pramila Gachchhadar	Deuba	837		50.11	Won	Women	
Province No. 1	Indira Thapa	Nidhi	96	1670	5.74	Lost	Women	
Province No. 1	Sita Karki	Koirala	737	1670	44.13	Lost	Women	
Madhesh	Ram Narayan Mahaseth	Independent	97				Open	
Madhesh	Arbind Amatya	Independent	257				Open	
Madhesh	Narayan Chaudhary	Nidhi-Gagan-Koirala	601				Open	
Madhesh	Binod Yadav	Nidhi-Gagan-Koirala	691				Open	
Madhesh	Parshuram Chaudhari	Deuba	822			Won	Open	
Madhesh	Jay Narayan Yadav	Deuba	879			Won	Open	
Madhesh	Bindu Yadav	Deuba	889			Won	Women	
Madhesh	Bhimadevi Sharma	Nidhi-Gagan-Koirala	532				Women	
Madhesh	Rita Yadav	Independent	156				Women	
Madhesh	Rekha Devi Mahara	Independent	76				Women	
Bagmati Province	Hari Sharan Shrestha	Deuba	839	2069	40.55	Won	Open	
Bagmati Province	Mahendra Thing	Deuba	801	2069	38.71	Lost	Open	
Bagmati Province	Rishi Ram Ghimire	Koirala	916	2069	44.27	Won	Open	
Bagmati Province	Dil Bahadur Tamang	Koirala	835	2069	40.35	Lost	Open	
Bagmati Province	Jeevan Dangol	Koirala	949	2069	45.86	Won	Women	
Bagmati Province	Moti Maya Tamang	Nidhi	218	2069	10.53	Lost	Women	
Bagmati Province	Niru Khadka	Deuba	786	2069	37.98	Lost	Women	
Gandaki Province	Ram Chandra Joshi	Koirala	569	1114	51.07	Won	Open	
Gandaki Province	Ramesh Pandey	Koirala	618	1114	55.47	Won	Open	
Gandaki Province	Rajan Raj Pant	Deuba	461	1114	41.38	Lost	Open	
Gandaki Province	Jhul Bahadur Rana	Deuba	488	1114	43.80	Lost	Open	
Gandaki Province	Yub Raj Bastakoti	Nidhi	92	1114	8.25	Lost	Open	
Gandaki Province	Kopila Ranabhat	Koirala	552	1066	51.78	Won	Women	
Gandaki Province	Omkala Gautam	Deuba	514	1066	48.21	Lost	Women	
Lumbini Province	Khagraj Pandey	Koirala	776	1532	50.65	Won	Open	
Lumbini Province	Bishnu Muskan	Koirala	859	1532	56.07	Won	Open	
Lumbini Province	Lakshmi Narayan Shah	Deuba	676	1532	44.12	Lost	Open	
Lumbini Province	Maya Pun	Deuba	752	1532	49.08	Lost	Open	
Lumbini Province	Nima Giri	Koirala	830	1517	54.71	Won	Women	
Lumbini Province	Sarita Chaudhary	Koirala	687	1517	45.28	Lost	Women	
Karnali Province	Upendra Bahadur Thapa	Deuba	430	800	53.75	Won	Open	
Karnali Province	Ekraj Dangi	Deuba	451	800	51.87	Won	Open	
Karnali Province	Netralal Koirala	Koirala	362	800	45.25	Lost	Open	
Karnali Province	Jayananda Upadhyaya	Koirala	393	800	49.13	Lost	Open	
Karnali Province	Ramchhaya Kumari Shahi	Deuba	435	800	54.37	Won	Women	
Karnali Province	Devika Kumari Singh	Koirala	365	800	45.63	Lost	Women	
Sudurpashchim Province	Gopal Datta Bhatt	Deuba	429	782	54.85	Won	Open	
Sudurpashchim Province	Chandramani Bhatt	Deuba	429	782	54.85	Won	Open	
Sudurpashchim Province	Padma Raj Pant	Koirala	206	782	26.34	Lost	Open	
Sudurpashchim Province	Narendra Bhatt	Koirala	179	782	22.89	Lost	Open	
Sudurpashchim Province	Laxman Bahadur Shahi	Nidhi	123	782	15.72	Lost	Open	
Sudurpashchim Province	Hark Bahadur Swar	Nidhi	58	782	7.41	Lost	Open	
Sudurpashchim Province	Ambika Chalaune	Deuba	554	782	70.84	Won	Women	
Sudurpashchim Province	Khina Bhandari	Koirala	180	782	23.01	Lost	Women	

== District president election ==
Supporting panel (Central leader)	No of district presidents won
Sher Bahadur Deuba	37
Shekhar Koirala	34
Bimalendra Nidhi	2
Prakash Man Singh	2
Krishna Prasad Sitaula	2
Total	77

== See also ==
- 2nd special convention of Nepali Congress
