= Hokse Bazar =

Place in Bagmati Province, Nepal

Hokse Bazar होक्से बजार
- Location in Nepal
- Coordinates: 27.65°N 85.65°E
- Country: Nepal
- Province: Bagmati Province
- District: Kabhrepalanchok District

Population (1991)
  - Total: 3,706
- Time zone: UTC+5:45 (Nepal Time)

Hokse Bazar is a market place in Panchkhal Municipality in Kabhrepalanchok District in Bagmati Province of central Nepal. It was merged to form the new municipality along with Panchkhal, Dewabhumi Baluwa, Anaikot and Sathighar Bhagawati village development committee on 18 May 2014. At the time of the 1991 Nepal census it had a population of 3706 and had 708 houses in it.
