= Pariyar (surname) =

Pariyar (Nepali: परियार) is a surname of Nepalese people belonging to the Damai caste.

Notable people with the surname include:

- Jiwan Pariyar, Nepali politician
- Kalpana Pariyar, Nepalese professional shooter
- Laxmi Pariyar, Nepali politician
- Prem Pariyar, Nepalese child singer
- Raju Pariyar born 1980), singer from Nepal
- Shiva Pariyar, Nepali singer
- Sujata Pariyar, Nepalese politician
- Tilak Pariyar, Nepalese politician
- Vimal Pariyar (born 1986), Indian professional footballer
- Yash Kumar (Suresh Kumar Nepal Pariyar), Nepali singer, songwriter, music composer, and actor
- Teena Pariyar, Miss Nepali 2025
