= Shekhar Koirala =

Nepalese Politician

Honourable Dr. Shekhar Koirala MP
- शेखर कोईराला
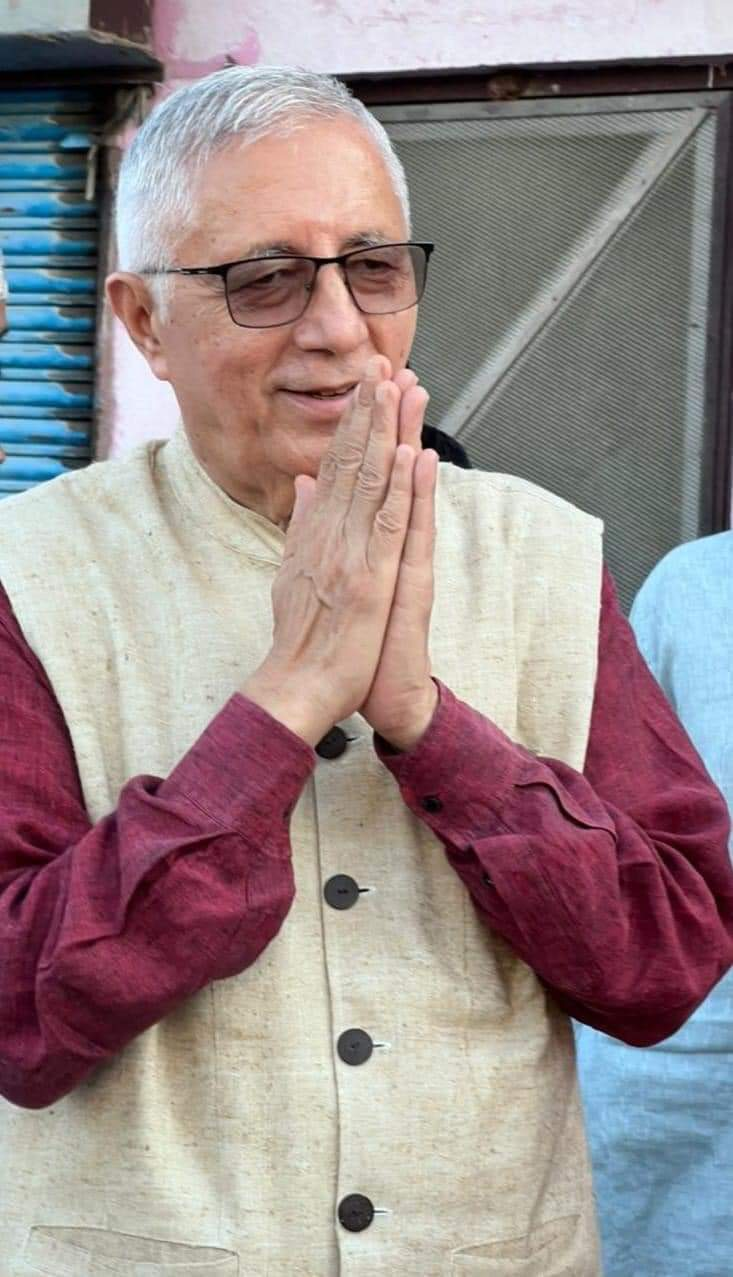

Member of Parliament, Pratinidhi Sabha
- In office 22 December 2022 – 12 September 2025
- Preceded by: Lal Babu Pandit
- Succeeded by: Rubina Acharya
- Constituency: Morang 6

Member of Legislature Parliament of Nepal
- In office 21 January 2014 – 14 October 2017
- Constituency: Morang 7

Personal details
- Born: August 25, 1950 (age 76) Biratnagar, Morang district
- Party: Nepali Congress
- Spouse: Poonam Koirala
- Children: 1
- Education: Mahendra Morang Campus

Shekhar Koirala (Nepali: डा. शेखर कोईराला) is a central working committee member of the Nepali Congress and a member of the 2nd Federal Parliament of Nepal.

== Political life ==
He is the current member of Federal Parliament of Nepal. He represented Morang 6 (constituency), which constitutes total 20 wards of 3 local level government of Morang District including Ward No 4, 5, 6, 7, 9, 11, 12 of Biratnagar, all 7 wards of Budhiganga Rural Municipality and Ward No 2, 3, 4, 5, 6, 7 of Sundar Haraicha Municipality. He was elected in the 2013 Nepalese Constituent Assembly election and 2008 Nepalese Constituent Assembly by-election from the area. He previously served as vice chancellor of BPKIHS, an autonomous health science university. He garnered the highest number of votes for member Central Working Committee of Nepali Congress.

== 14th general convention of Nepali Congress ==
Shekhar Koirala ran for the post of Party Chairman in 14th general convention of Nepali Congress which he lost to Sher Bahadur Deuba in 2nd round. He along with Youth Leaders formed the alliance (Koirala) and gave the candidacy in all posts winning 1 Vice-Chairman (Dhanraj Gurung), 1 General Secretary (Gagan Thapa), 2 Joint General Secretary (Jiwan Pariyar and Badri Pandey) and 34 Central committee members.

=== 1st Round for Party Chairman ===
Candidate's Name	Panel	Votes		Percentage	Result	Reference
Candidate's Name	Panel	Obtained	Total	Percentage	Result	Reference
Sher Bahadur Deuba	Deuba-Sitaula-Poudel-Shashank	2258	4679	48.25	Round 2	In 2nd round for not crossing 50%(+1) votes.
Shekhar Koirala	Koirala	1702	4679	36.37	Round 2	In 2nd round for not crossing 50%(+1) votes.
Prakash Man Singh	Singh	371	4679	7.92		In 2nd round for not crossing 50%(+1) votes.
Bimalendra Nidhi	Nidhi	250	4679	5.34		In 2nd round for not crossing 50%(+1) votes.
Kalyan Gurung	Independent	22	4679	0.47		In 2nd round for not crossing 50%(+1) votes.

=== 2nd Round for Party Chairman ===
Candidate's Name	Support	Votes		Percentage	Result	Reference
Candidate's Name	Support	Obtained	Total	Percentage	Result	Reference
Sher Bahadur Deuba	Deuba-Nidhi-Singh-Sitaula-Poudel-Shashank	2733	4623	59.12%	Elected	
Shekhar Koirala	Koirala	1855	4623	40.13%		

== Birth and family ==
He was born on 25 August 1950 to father Keshav Prasad Koirala and Nona Koirala belonging to Koirala family of politicians.

== Medical profession ==
He is a physician by profession. He worked at Bir Hospital, BPKIHS and Koshi Zonal Hospital.

== See also ==
- Koirala family
- 2nd special convention of Nepali Congress
