= Palanchok Bhagawati Temple =

Hindu temple in Nepal

Palanchok Bhagawati
- पलाञ्चोक भगवती
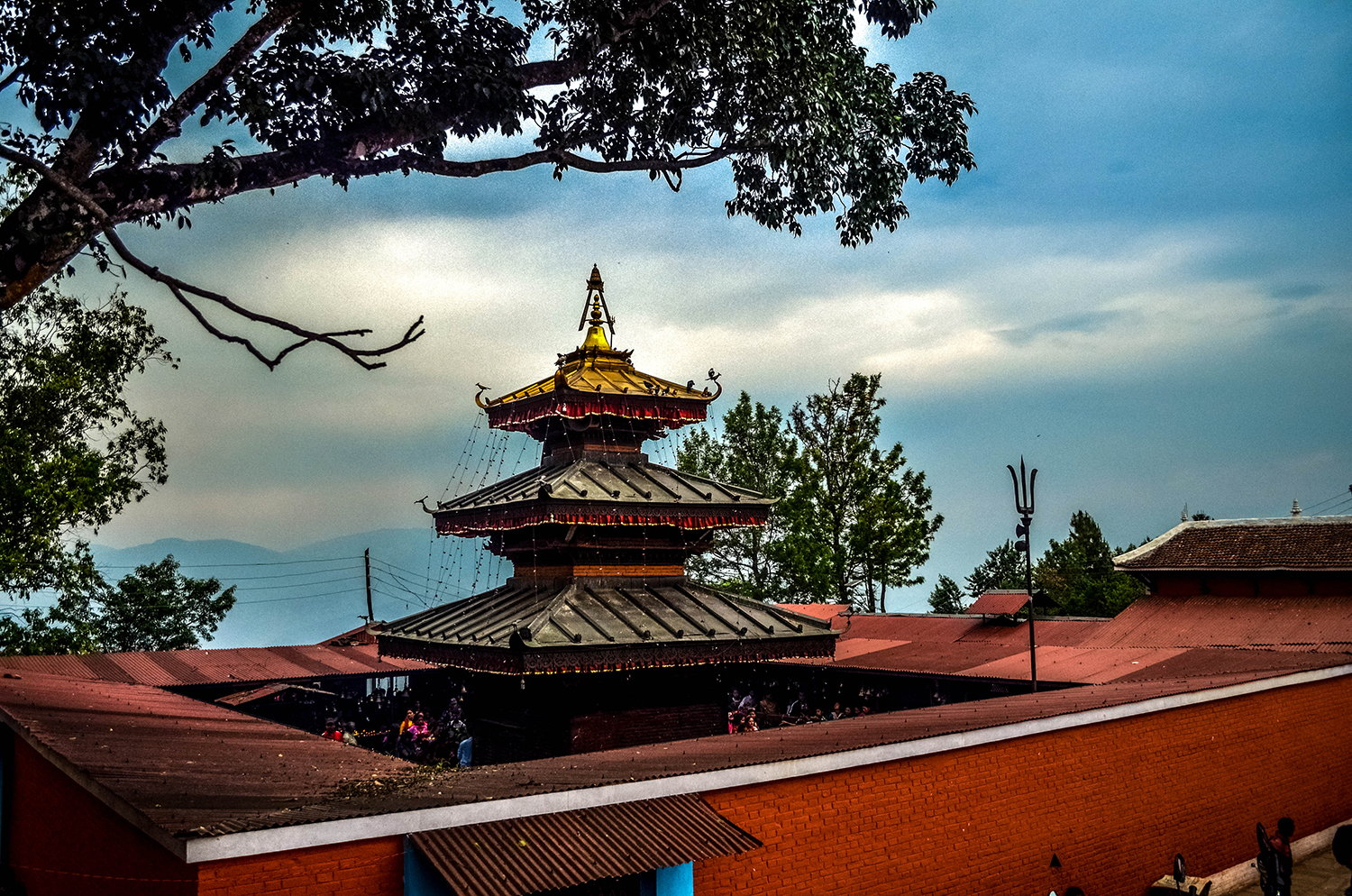

- Location in Nepal

Religion
- Affiliation: Hinduism
- District: Kavrepalanchok
- Deity: Bhagavati
- Festivals: Dashain, Chaite Dashain

Location
- Location: Sathighar Bhagawati, Panchkhal
- Country: Nepal
- Coordinates: 27°37′43″N 85°40′26″E

Architecture
- Type: Pagoda
- Established: 5th Century CE

Palanchok Bhagawati Temple (Nepali: पलाञ्चोक भगवती मन्दिर) is an ancient Hindu temple in Nepal dedicated to Goddess Bhagawati. The temple is believed to have been constructed during the reign of the King Mānadeva (464-505 AD),and is located in Panchkhal Municipality, approximately 42 km from Kathmandu. The temple houses a three-foot-tall idol of the goddess carved from black stone. The goddess deity, depicted with 18 arms, is revered as a protector who safeguards devotees from dangers and misfortunes. Palanchok Bhagawati is considered the elder sister of all the other Bhagawati goddesses in Nepal.

== Location and architecture ==
The temple is situated on the summit of Palanchok Hill at an altitude of 1,563 meters (5,125 feet), offering panoramic views of the Himalayas and the surrounding countryside. It is a Pagoda style structure connected to the Araniko Highway, located 7 km north of Panchkhal and 15 km from Dhulikhel. Palanchok Bhagwati is considered one of the most popular and important religious and tourist destinations of Panchkhal.

== Religious significance and festivals ==
Palanchok Bhagawati is regarded as the elder sister of other Bhagawati shrines of Nepal. The temple is a major pilgrimage site, particularly during Dashain and Chaite Dashain, when thousands of devotees visit to offer prayers and animal sacrifices. Tuesdays and Saturdays are considered auspicious days for worship, and the temple also hosts the Kshama ritual on full moon days in Baisakh and Jestha.

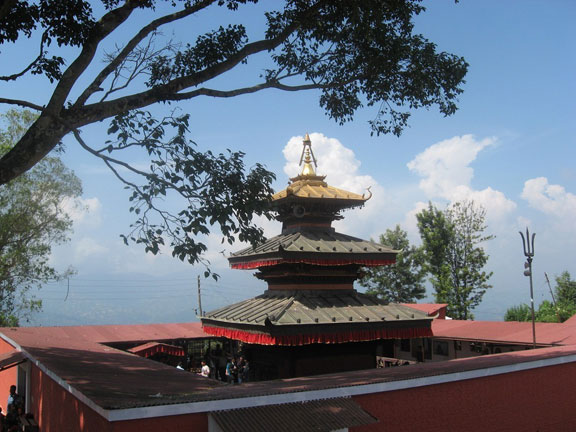
Palanchok Bhagwati Temple

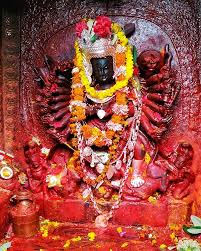
Goddess Palanchok Bhagwati
