= Sunil Kumar Sharma (Nepalese politician) =

Nepalese politician

Honourable Sunil Sharma
- शुनिल शर्मा

Member of Parliament, Pratinidhi Sabha
- In office 22 December 2022 – 12 September 2025
- Succeeded by: Ganesh Karki
- Constituency: Morang 3

Personal details
- Born: 6 January 1978 (age 48) Morang District
- Party: Nepali Congress
- Spouse: Indira Baral
- Parents: Lekhnath Neupane (father); Homa Devi Neupane (mother)

Sunil Kumar Sharma is a Nepalese politician, businessman and philanthropist. He is former Member of Parliament (MP) from Nepali Congress. He served as a member of the 2nd Federal Parliament of Nepal. In the 2022 Nepalese general election, he won the election from Morang 3 (constituency).
