= Janak Raj Giri =

Nepali politician

Member of Parliament, Pratinidhi Sabha
- Incumbent
- Assumed office 26 March 2026
- Preceded by: Badri Pandey
- Constituency: Bajura 1
- In office 28 April 2006 – 16 January 2008
- Preceded by: Himself (2002)
- Succeeded by: Dev Raj Joshi (as Member of the Constituent Assembly)
- Constituency: Bajura 1
- In office 23 June 1999 – 22 May 2002
- Preceded by: Hikmat Bahadur Shahi
- Succeeded by: Himself (2006)
- Constituency: Bajura 1

Personal details
- Party: Nepali Congress

Janak Raj Giri (Nepali: जनक राज गिरी) is a Nepalese politician and member of the Nepali Congress party. In March 2026, he was elected as a member of the 7th House of Representatives from Bajura 1, re-entering the federal parliament after 29 years.

== Election record ==
In 2026, Nepali Congress candidate Janak Raj Giri won 17,173 votes in the election for the House of Representatives from Bajura. His closest competitor, CPN-UML candidate Lal Bahadur Thapa, received 16,633 votes.
