= Singhadurbar Badalne Sangharsha =

2017 autobiography by Lal Babu Pandit

Singhadurbar Badalne Sangharsha (सिंह दरबार बदल्ने सङ्घर्स)
- Author: Lal Babu Pandit
- Original title: सिंह दरबार बदल्ने सङ्घर्स
- Language: Nepali
- Subject: Politics of Nepal
- Genre: Autobiography
- Set in: Nepal
- Published: 2017
- Publisher: Nepa Laya Publication
- Publication place: Nepal
- Pages: 100
- ISBN: 9789937909075

Singhadurbar Badalne Sangharsha (English:Struggle to Change Singha Durbar) is Nepalese autobiography Political Non-fiction book written by Nepalese politician Lal Babu Pandit originally published in 2017 under the banner of Publication company Nepa Laya Publication.

Singhadurbar Badalne Sangharsha describes the story of politician Lal Babu Pandit with his 40 years of experience in Politics career and he is known mostly for fighting the corruption and malpractice throughout Nepal also Pandit has set an example of good politician throughout Nepal.

== Synopsis ==
Lal Babu Pandit is a politician who has been referred as a good politician and fighting for the honesty to remark about his politics he has written a book about changing the parliament of Nepal. The book starts with Pandit getting a call from CPN (UML) to inform him he has been nominated for the ministerial post. The book also talks about the story of movement with late Madan Bhandari and his student life with his family.

== Release ==
Singhadurbar Badalne Sangharsha was released to the public on 14 November 2017 with price of Rs.325. When releasing the book the author said "‘I saw corruption and malpractices rampant everywhere after I became a minister and hence I thought the process of change needs to start from within" and "I have sincerely put forward the work carried out during my tenure as a minister." in an interview with Kantipur.
