= Rubina Acharya =

Nepalese politician

- रुबिना आचार्य

Member of Parliament, Pratinidhi Sabha
- Incumbent
- Assumed office 26 March 2026
- Preceded by: Shekhar Koirala
- Constituency: Morang 6

Personal details
- Party: Rastriya Swatantra Party
- Other political affiliations: Bibeksheel Sajha Party (Till Jan 2026)
- Education: Kathmandu University (MBA)
- Profession: Politician

Rubina Acharya (Nepali: रुबिना आचार्य) is a Nepalese politician serving as a member of parliament from the Rastriya Swatantra Party. She is a member of the 7th House of Representatives elected from Morang 6 constituency in 2026 Nepalese General Election securing 55,513 votes and defeating Shekhar Koirala of the Nepali Congress. She previously held in the leadership role in Bibeksheel Sajha Youth Organization from Bagmati Province Committee and had been socially active in Dr. Govinda KC's medical education reform campaign, the Hot Meal Campaign conducted during the Corona pandemic. She holds MBA from Kathmandu University.
