= Morang 3 =

Parliamentary constituency of the Morang District in Nepal

- Parliamentary constituency
- Morang 3 in Koshi Province
- Province: Koshi
- District: Morang District

Current constituency
- Created: 1991
- Party: Rastriya Swatantra Party
- Member of Parliament: Ganesh Karki
- Member of the Provincial Assembly: Suyarma Raj Rai, NC
- Member of the Provincial Assembly: Raj Kumar Ojha, CPN (UML)

Morang 3 is one of six parliamentary constituencies of Morang District in Nepal. This constituency came into existence on the Constituency Delimitation Commission (CDC) report submitted on 31 August 2017.

== Incorporated areas ==
Morang 3 incorporates wards 1–4 and 7–10 of Pathari Shanishchare Municipality, wards 4–7 of Kanepokhari Rural Municipality, wards 1–4 and 8–11 of Belbari Municipality and wards 1 and 8–12 of Sundarharaicha Municipality.

== Assembly segments ==
It encompasses the following Province No. 1 Provincial Assembly segment

- Morang 3(A)
- Morang 3(B)

== Members of Parliament ==
=== Parliament/Constituent Assembly ===
Election	Member	Party
1991	Lal Babu Pandit	CPN (Unified Marxist–Leninist)
1994	Badri Narayan Basnet	Nepali Congress
1999	Lal Babu Pandit	CPN (Unified Marxist–Leninist)
2008	Sabitri Kumar Kafle	CPN (Maoist)
January 2009	Sabitri Kumar Kafle	UCPN (Maoist)
2013	Gaurav timsina	Nepali Congress
2017	Bhanu Bhakta Dhakal	CPN (Unified Marxist–Leninist)
May 2018	Bhanu Bhakta Dhakal	Nepal Communist Party
March 2021	Bhanu Bhakta Dhakal	CPN (Unified Marxist–Leninist)
2022	Sunil Kumar Sharma	Nepali Congress
2026	Ganesh Karki	Rastriya Swatantra Party

=== Provincial Assembly ===
==== 3(A) ====
Election	Member	Party
2017	Sumarya Raj Rai	Nepali Congress

==== 3(B) ====
Election	Member	Party
2017	Raj Kumar Ojha	CPN (Unified Marxist-Leninist)
May 2018	Raj Kumar Ojha	Nepal Communist Party
March 2021	Raj Kumar Ojha	CPN (Unified Marxist–Leninist)

== Election results ==
=== Election in the 2020s ===
==== 2026 general election ====
Candidate	Party	Votes	%
Ganesh Karki	Rastriya Swatantra Party	36,924	41.28
Dr. Sunil Kumar Sharma	Nepali Congress	24,354	27.22
Amir Magar	Shram Sanskriti Party	16,509	18.45
Iran Kumar Rai	CPN (UML)	7,752	8.67
Dr. Deuman Sambahamphe	Nepali Communist Party	1,259	1.41
Prem Prasad Subedi	Rastriya Prajatantra Party	733	0.82
Bikendra Rai	Mongol National Organisation	647	0.72
Mitrasen Yonjan	Ujyaalo Nepal Party	643	0.72
Khadga Bahadur Karki	Nepal Communist Party (Maoist)	142	0.16
Dilli Bahadur Jawegu	Sanghiya Loktantrik Rastriya Manch	129	0.14
Others		364	0.41
Total		89,456	100.00
Majority		12,570	
Rastriya Swatantra Party gain			

==== 2022 general election ====
Candidate	Party	Votes	%
Dr. Sunil Kumar Sharma	Nepali Congress	48,631	52.74
Bhanu Bhakta Dhakal	CPN (UML)	25,895	28.09
Rekha Thapa	Rastriya Prajatantra Party	10,998	11.93
Bikas Upreti	Rastriya Swatantra Party	3,172	3.44
Bikendra Rai	Mongol National Organisation	1,520	1.65
Others		1,986	2.15
Total		92,202	100.00
Majority		22,736	
Nepali Congress gain			

=== Election in the 2010s ===
==== 2017 legislative elections ====
Party	Candidate	Votes
CPN (Unified Marxist–Leninist)	Bhanu Bhakta Dhakal	42,413
Nepali Congress	Sunil Kumar Sharma	40,506
CPN (Marxist–Leninist)	Uddhim Bahadur Khadka	1,338
Sanghiya Loktantrik Rastriya Manch	Bhawi Raj Limbu	1,013
Others		2,173
Invalid votes		4,160
Result	CPN (UML) gain	
Source: Election Commission

==== 2017 Nepalese provincial elections ====
===== 3(A) =====
Party	Candidate	Votes
Nepali Congress	Sumarya Raj Rai	20,299
CPN (Maoist Centre)	Gita Timilsina	19,399
Janasamajbadi Party Nepal	Misan Sherpa	1,435
Sanghiya Loktantrik Rastriya Manch	Nanda Bahadur Rai	1,050
Others		944
Invalid votes		1,230
Result	Congress gain	
Source: Election Commission

===== 3(B) =====
Party	Candidate	Votes
CPN (Unified Marxist–Leninist)	Raj Kumar Ojha	22,820
Nepali Congress	Lalit Bahadur Shrestha	20,287
Others		1,897
Invalid votes		1,295
Result	CPN (UML) gain	
Source: Election Commission

==== 2013 Constituent Assembly election ====
Party	Candidate	Votes
Nepali Congress	Dilip Khawas Gachhadar	12,984
CPN (Unified Marxist–Leninist)	Guru Prasad Baral	12,674
UCPN (Maoist)	Khem Raj Bhattarai	6,266
Madheshi Janaadhikar Forum, Nepal (Democratic)	Satya Narayan Bhagat Tharu	4,576
Federal Socialist Party, Nepal	Minu Rai	1,956
Others		3,124
Result	Congress gain	
Source: NepalNews

=== Election in the 2000s ===
==== 2008 Constituent Assembly election ====
Party	Candidate	Votes
CPN (Maoist)	Sabitri Kumar Kafle	15,863
Nepali Congress	Satya Narayan Bhagat Tharu	12,626
CPN (Unified Marxist–Leninist)	Naresh Prasad Pokharel	10,481
CPN (Marxist–Leninist)	Kamala Rai	2,102
Madheshi Janaadhikar Forum, Nepal	Bhim Lal Bhagat Tharu	1,896
Rastriya Prajatantra Party	Pakhu Lal Bishwas	1,198
Others		1,921
Invalid votes		3,398
Result	Maoist gain	
Source: Election Commission

=== Election in the 1990s ===
==== 1999 legislative elections ====
Party	Candidate	Votes
CPN (Unified Marxist–Leninist)	Lal Babu Pandit	16,288
Nepali Congress	Gopal Man Singh Rajbhandari	15,589
Nepal Sadbhawana Party	Dilip Kumar Dhadewa	7,042
Rastriya Prajatantra Party	Harendra Bahadur Thapa	6,939
CPN (Marxist–Leninist)	Tara Bahadur Kafle	2,080
Others		1,629
Invalid Votes		1,589
Result	CPN (UML) gain	
Source: Election Commission

==== 1994 legislative elections ====
Party	Candidate	Votes
Nepali Congress	Badri Narayan Basnet	19,821
CPN (Unified Marxist–Leninist)	Lal Babu Pandit	14,987
Rastriya Prajatantra Party	Janak Bahadur Karki	4,312
Others		1,885
Result	Congress gain	
Source: Election Commission

==== 1991 legislative elections ====
Party	Candidate	Votes
CPN (Unified Marxist–Leninist)	Lal Babu Pandit	18,667
Nepali Congress	Badri Narayan Basnet	16,670
Result	CPN (UML) gain	

== See also ==
- List of parliamentary constituencies of Nepal
