= Karna Bahadur Thapa =

Nepali politician

- कर्णबहादुर थापा

Minister of Industry of Nepal
- In office 25 February 2014 – 14 September 2014
- President: Ram Baran Yadav
- Prime Minister: Sushil Koirala
- Preceded by: Anil Kumar Jha
- Succeeded by: Mahesh Basnet

Member of the Constituent Assembly
- In office 21 January 2014 – 14 October 2017
- Preceded by: Dev Raj Joshi
- Succeeded by: Lal Bahadur Thapa (as Member of Parliament)
- Constituency: Bajura 1

Personal details
- Party: Communist Party of Nepal (Unified Marxist-Leninist)

Karna Bahadur Thapa (Nepali: कर्ण बहादुर थापा), a member of Communist Party of Nepal (Unified Marxist-Leninist), assumed the post of the Minister of Industry of Nepal on 25 February 2014 under Sushil Koirala-led government.

He is a member of 2nd Nepalese Constituent Assembly. He won Bajura–1 seat in the CA assembly in 2013. He is the chairman of Nepal Communist Party Sudurpaschim Pradesh Committee.
