= Lal Babu Pandit =

Nepali politician (born 1958)

Honourable Lal Babu Pandit
- लाल बाबु पण्डित
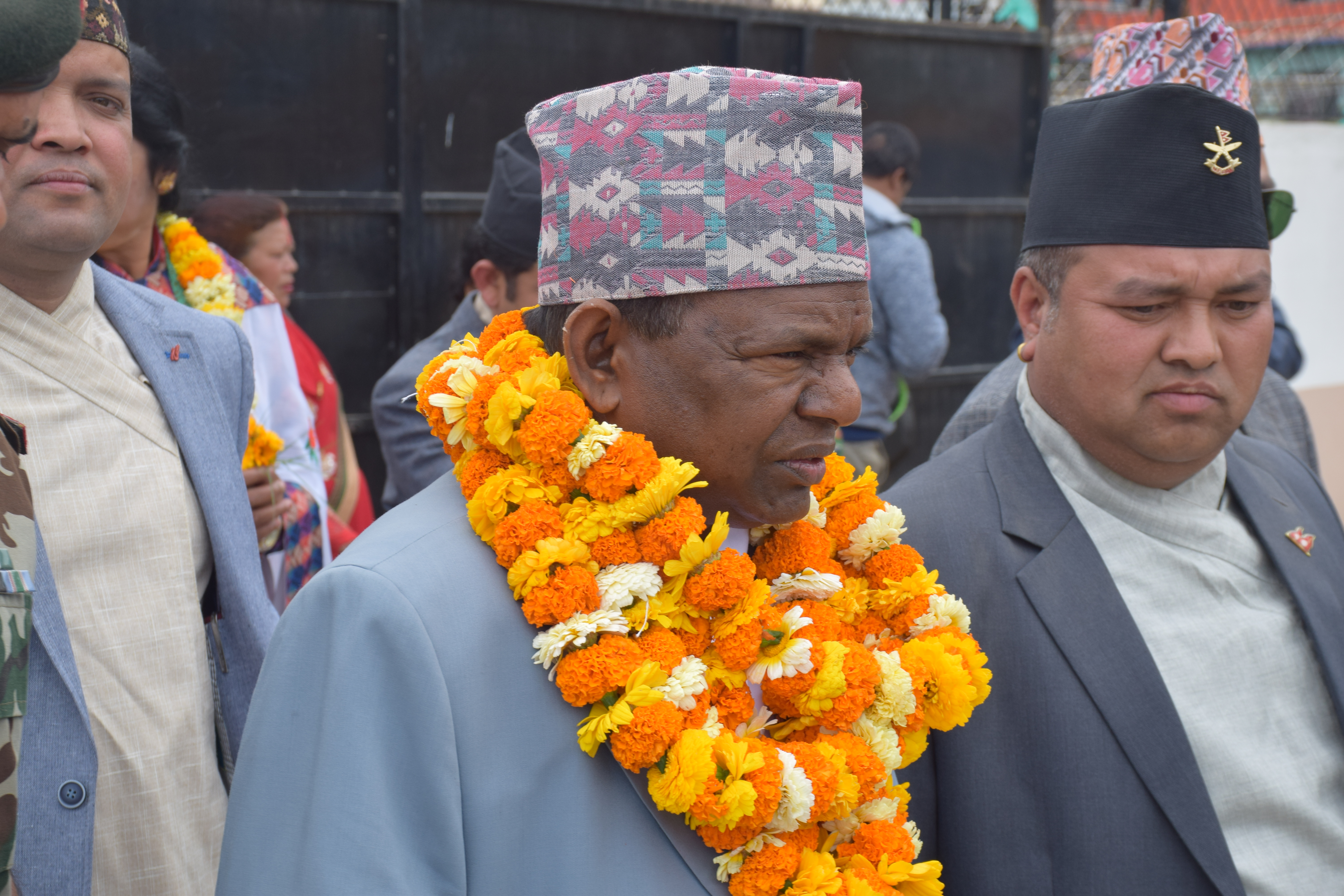
- Lal Babu Pandit

Minister of Federal Affairs and General Administration
- In office 16 March 2018 – 20 November 2019
- President: Bidhya Devi Bhandari
- Prime Minister: Khadga Prasad Sharma Oli

Minister of General Administration
- In office 25 February 2014 – 12 October 2015
- President: Ram Baran Yadav
- Prime Minister: Sushil Koirala

Member of Parliament, Pratinidhi Sabha
- In office 4 March 2018 – 18 September 2022
- Preceded by: Mahesh Acharya
- Succeeded by: Shekhar Koirala
- Constituency: Morang 6
- In office May 1999 – May 2002
- Preceded by: Badri Narayan Basnet
- Succeeded by: Sabirtri Kumar Kafle
- Constituency: Morang 3
- In office May 1991 – August 1994
- Preceded by: Constituency established
- Succeeded by: Badri Narayan Basnet
- Constituency: Morang 3

Member of Constituent Assembly for CPN (UML) party list
- In office 28 May 2008 – 28 May 2012

Personal details
- Born: 4 December 1958 (age 67) Sarlahi, Nepal
- Party: CPN (UML)
- Profession: Politician

Lal Babu Pandit is a Nepalese politician from Nepal Communist Party and was the Minister of Federal Affairs and General Administration under Second Oli cabinet. He was elected to the House of Representatives from Morang - 6 in the 2017 election by defeating Congress candidate Shekhar Koirala. He was elected to the First and Second Constituent Assembly under Proportional Representation system.

== Minister of General Administration ==
He was the Minister of General Administration under Sushil Koirala led government during which he gained publicity for his campaign against officials holding Permanent Resident status of other countries.

=== Action against Permanent Residency holders ===
In 2014 he garnered attention for creating a list of 1,100 senior government officials who hold permanent residency in foreign countries and announced to take action against the people on the list. He claimed that he received a number of death threats for his controversial action to disallow permanent residency holding government officials from the service.

=== Action against dilly-dallying government employees ===
He has warned of taking action against the employees who dillydally while providing services to the service seekers during the government's new administrative system of twelve-hour-long service which includes two shifts in a day.

== Electoral history ==
1991 Pratinidhi Sabha Election Morang

Party	Candidate	Votes	Status
CPN-UML	Lal Babu Pandit	–	Elected

1994 Pratinidhi Sabha Election Morang

Party	Candidate	Votes	Status
CPN-UML	Lal Babu Pandit	–	Lost

1999 Pratinidhi Sabha Election Morang-2

Party	Candidate	Votes	Status
CPN-UML	Lal Babu Pandit	16288	Elected
Nepali Congress	Gopal Man Singh Rajbhandari	15589	Lost

2017 Pratinidhi Sabha Election Morang-6

Party	Candidate	Votes	Status
CPN-UML	Lal Babu Pandit	33,266	Elected
Nepali Congress	Shekhar Koirala	33,141	Lost

== Bibliography ==
- Singhadurbar Badalne Sangharsha (2017)
