= Man Bahadur Bishwakarma =

Nepali politician

- मान बहादुर विश्वकर्मा

Member of Parliament, Pratinidhi Sabha for Nepali Congress party list
- Incumbent
- Assumed office 4 March 2018

Member of Constituent Assembly for Nepali Congress party list
- In office 21 January 2014 – 14 October 2017

Personal details
- Born: 4 July 1948 (age 77) Arghakhanchi District
- Party: Nepali Congress

Man Bahadur Bishwakarma is a Nepali politician, former cabinet minister and an incumbent member of the House of Representatives of the federal parliament of Nepal. He was elected to parliament in the 2017 legislative election, from Nepali Congress, under the proportional representation system, filling the reserved seat for Dalits.

He is a member of the central working committee of the main opposition party Nepali Congress since 2009.

He served as the Minister for Environment, Science and Technology in 2007.
