= Dibeshwory Shah =

Nepali politician

Honourable Divyashwory Shah
- दिव्यश्वरी शाह

Province Assembly Member of Sudurpaschim Province
- Incumbent
- Assumed office 2017
- Preceded by: Assembly Created

Personal details
- Born: 2000 B.S. Dhangadhi -2, Kailali, Sudurpaschim Province, Nepal
- Party: Nepali Congress

Divyashwori Shah (Nepali: दिव्यश्वरी शाह) is a Nepali politician belonging to Nepali Congress. She is from dhangadhi -2 ratopool, kailali, sudurpaschim pardesh. She is also serving as member of the Sudurpashchim Province Provincial Assembly. Shah vied for the post of vice president of Nepali Congress in 14th general convention of Nepali Congress from Bimalendra Nidhi panel.
