= Badri Pandey (politician) =

Nepali politician

Honorable Badri Pandey
- बद्री पाण्डे
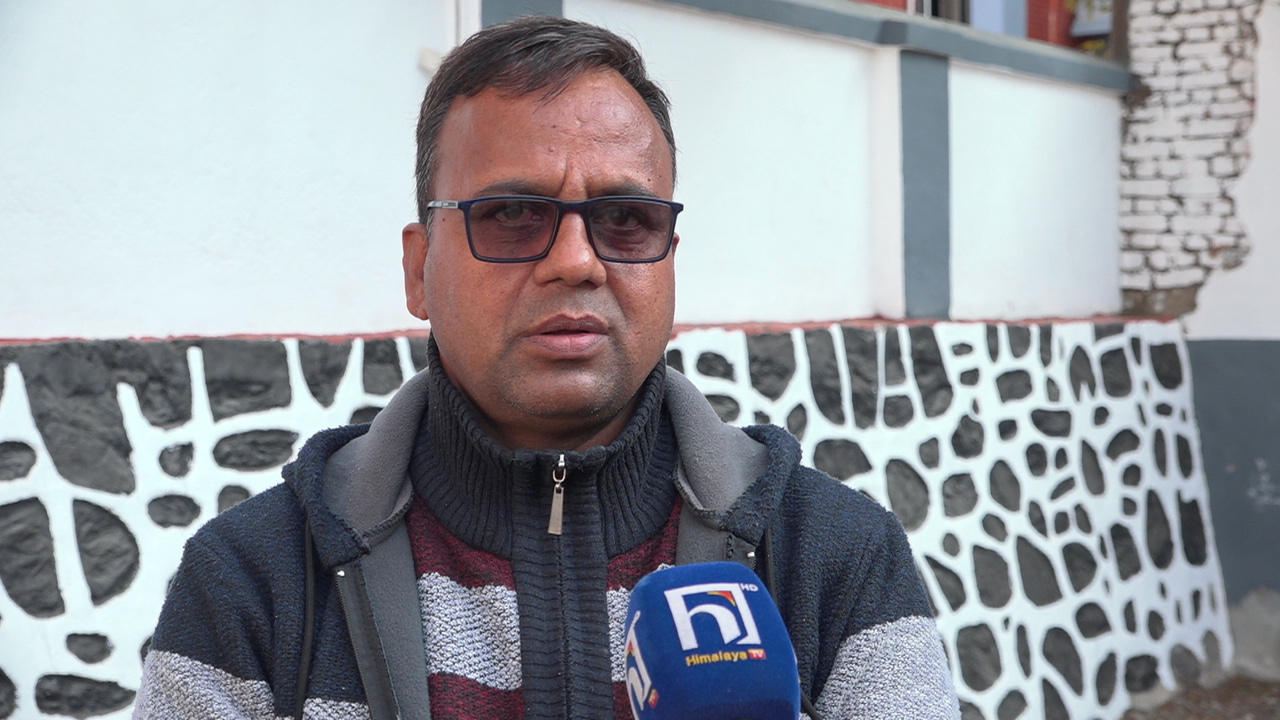

Minister of Culture, Tourism and Civil Aviation of Nepal
- In office 15 July 2024 – 9 September 2025
- President: Ram Chandra Poudel
- Prime Minister: K. P. Sharma Oli
- Preceded by: Hit Bahadur Tamang

Deputy General Secretary of Nepali Congress
- Incumbent
- Assumed office 18 December 2021 Serving with Kishore Singh Rathore, Mahendra Yadav, Umakant Chaudhary, Bhishma Raj Angdembe, Jiwan Pariyar and Farmullah Mansoor
- President: Sher Bahadur Deuba
- Preceded by: Prakash Sharan Mahat
Parliamentary offices
Member of Parliament, Pratinidhi Sabha
In office 22 December 2022 – 12 September 2025
Preceded by	Lal Bahadur Thapa
Succeeded by	Janak Raj Giri
Constituency	Bajura 1
Member of the Parliament, Rastriya Sabha
In office 4 March 2018 – 3 March 2020
Preceded by	Constituency created
Succeeded by	Taraman Swar
Constituency	Sudurpashchim Province
Member of the Constituent Assembly / Legislature Parliament
In office 21 January 2014 – 14 October 2017

Personal details
- Born: 21 February 1974 (age 52) Bajura, Sudurpashchim Province, Nepal
- Party: Nepali Congress
- Spouse: Sarita Humagai
- Children: Binamra Pandey, Britant Pandey, Barsha Pandey
- Parent: Bishnu Dutta Pandey (father)
- Education: Tribhuwan University

Badri Pandey (Nepali: बद्री पाण्डे) is a Nepali politician belonging to Nepali Congress. He was a member of National assembly elected from 2018 elections. He was elected in 2022 from Bajura to the House of Representatives.

He was appointed as Minister for Culture, Tourism and Civil Aviation.

He is the elected deputy general secretary of the ruling party elected by 14th general convention of Nepali Congress.

== Political life ==
Pandey was elected member of second constituent assembly from proportional list of Nepali Congress. Following this, he was elected member of National Assembly from Sudurpaschim province where he represented Nepali Congress.

He was elected deputy general secretary of the party on Backward quota defeating incumbent Karnali Chief Minister Jeevan Bahadur Shahi.
