= Panchkhal =

Municipality in Bagmati Pradesh, Nepal

Panchkhal पाँचखाल
- Municipality
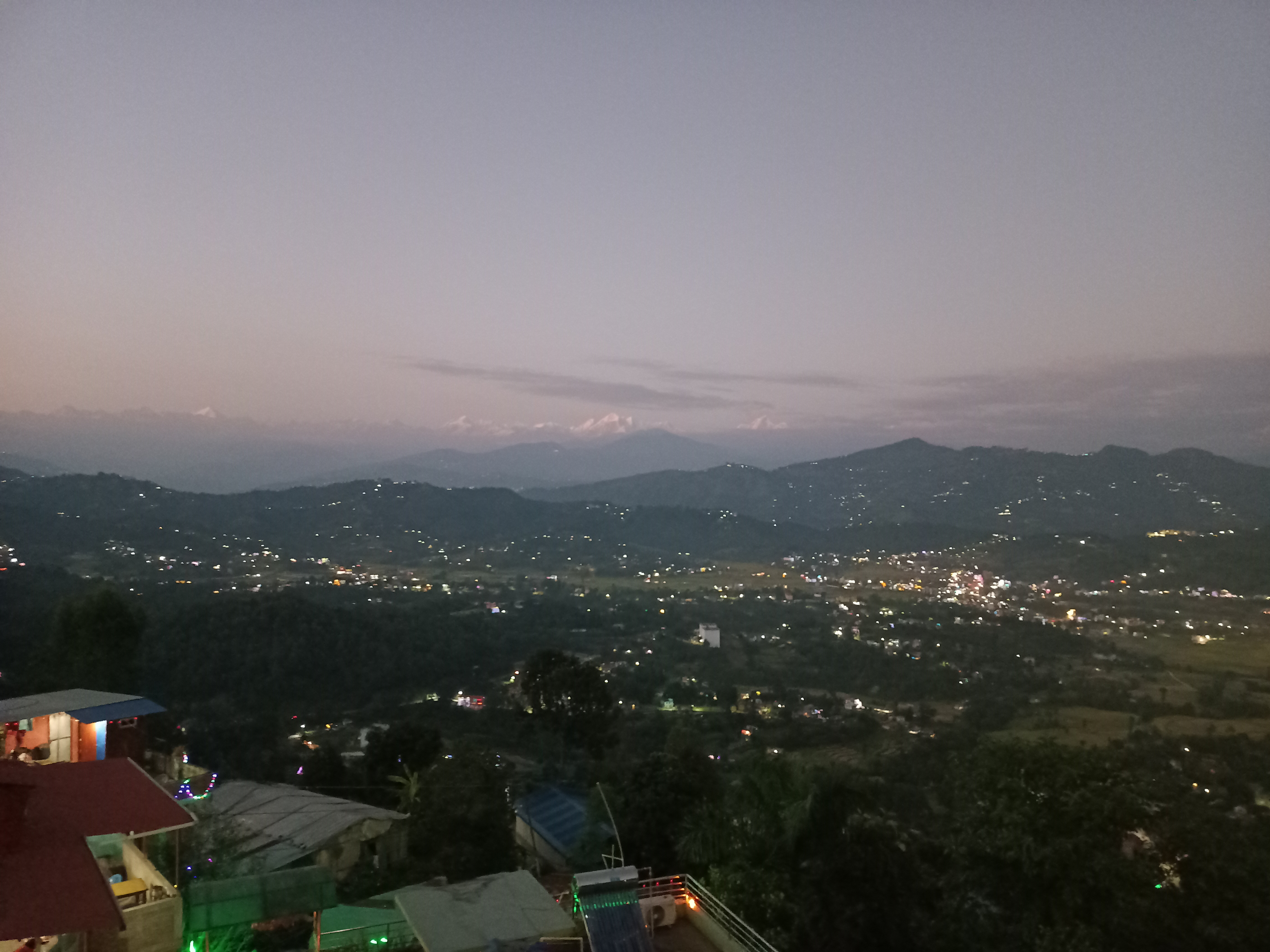
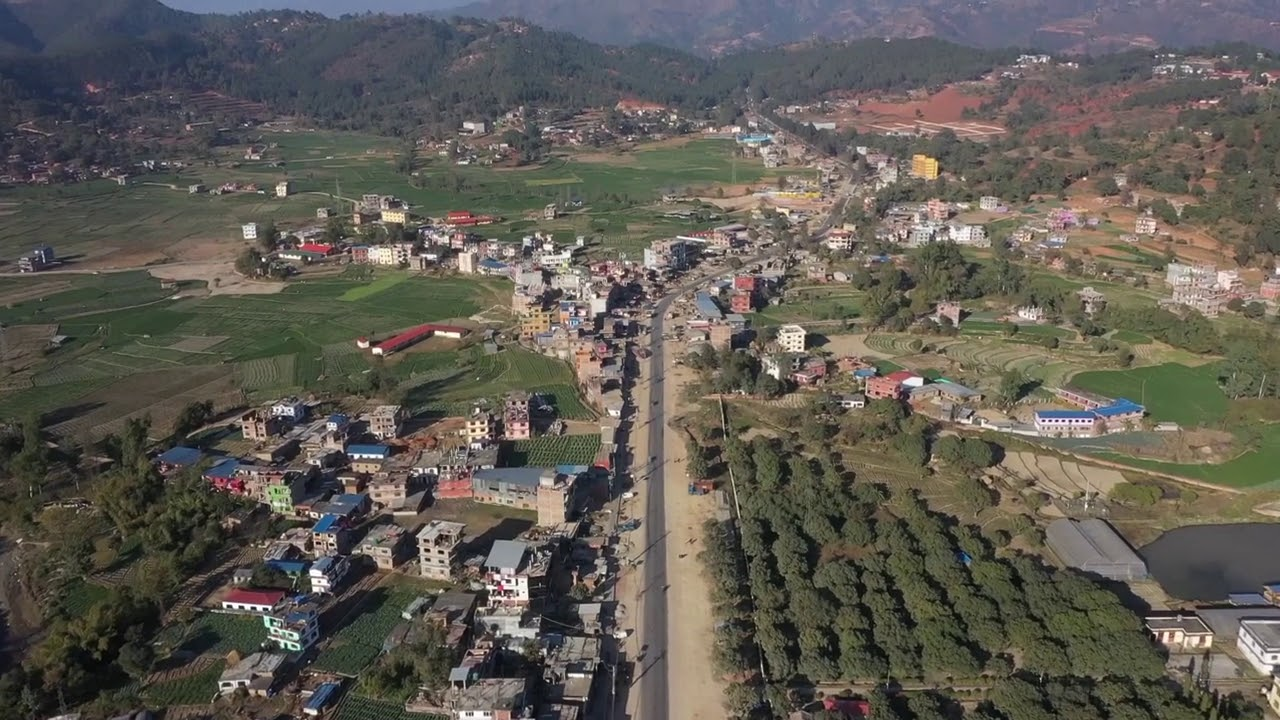
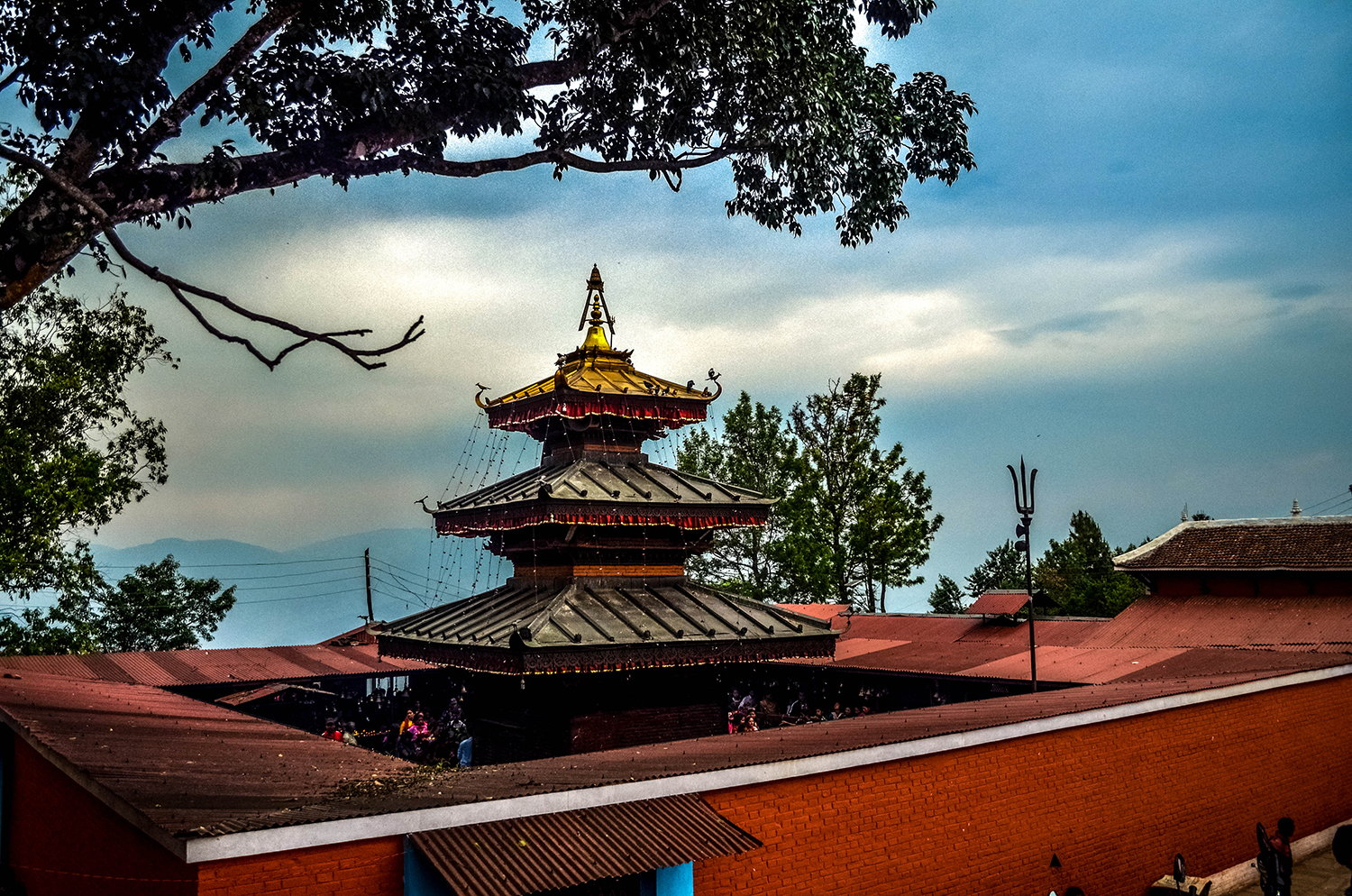
- Evening view of Panchkhal Valley, 2025 Tamaghat, capital area of Panchkhal Palanchok Bhagawati, a popular religious destination in Panchkhal

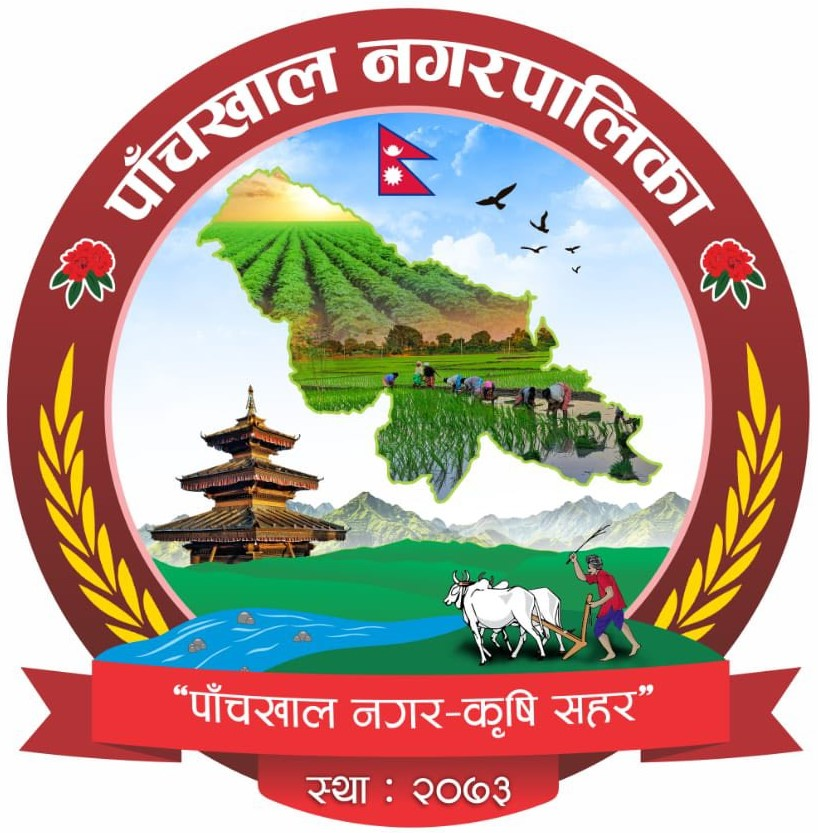
- Seal
- Motto(s): पाँचखाल नगर, कृषि शहर (transl.: Panchkhal Municipal-Agriculture City)
- Location in Nepal
- Coordinates: 27°39′N 85°37′E
- Country: Nepal
- Province: Bagmati Province
- District: Kavrepalanchok District

Government
  - Mayor: Mahesh Kharel (NC)
  - Deputy Mayor: Surya Maya Danuwar CPN(UML)

Population (2021)
  - Total: 35,521
  - Density: 345/km^{2} (890/sq mi)
- Time zone: UTC+5:45 (NST)
- Postal code: 45212
- Area code: 011
- Website: panchkhalmun.gov.np/en

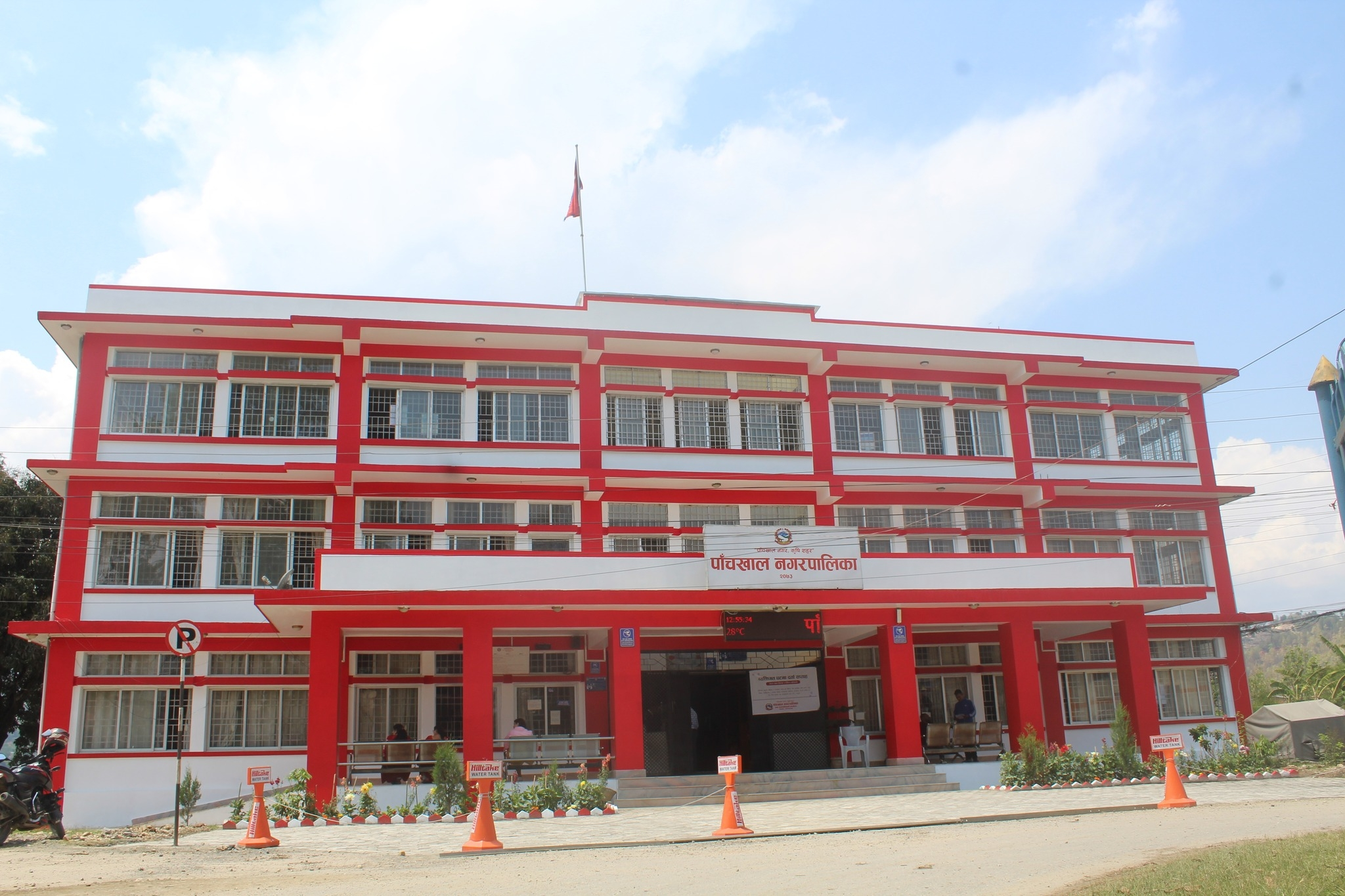
Panchkhal Municipality Office

Panchkhal (Nepali: पाँचखाल) is a Municipality in Kavrepalanchok District in the Bagmati Province of central Nepal. Panchkhal has an area of 103 km^{2} and population density of 345/km^{2}, according to the 2021 Nepal census. Glacial strand retreat and fluvial incision led to develop landscapes and evolve the area having a relief of about 122 to 750 m. At the time of the 2021 Nepal census, it had a population of 35,521 in 9,133 total households. Panchkhal municipality was established in 2016 through the merger of five former Village Development Committees (VDCs): Anaikot, Hokse Bazar, Kharelthok, Koshidekha, and Baluwa. The restructuring was carried out following a decision made in 2014 by the Ministry of Federal Affairs and General Administration. Panchkhal is known for its agricultural productivity and promotes itself with the motto of “पाँचखाल नगर-कृषि शहर (lit. Panchkhal Municipal-Agriculture City)”.

== Demographics ==
At the time of the 2021 Nepal census, Panchkhal Municipality had a population of 35,521. Of these, 48.9% spoke Nepali, 21.4% Tamang, 11.8% Danuwar, 11.2% Newar, 0.3% Maithili, 0.9% Magar and 5.5% other languages as their first language.

In terms of ethnicity/caste, 25.4% were Hill Brahmin, 22.9% Tamang, 12.8% Danuwar, 12.4% Newar, 8.8% Chhetri, 5.7% Mijar, 4.4% Bishwakarma, 3.6% Done, 2.1% Pariyar, 1.8% Gharti/Bhujel, and 0.1% others.

In terms of religion, 74.4% were Hindu, 21.8% Buddhist, 3.6% Christian, 0.1% Prakriti, 0.07% Muslim and 0.03% others.

In terms of education, the overall literacy rate was 75.15%, where the literacy rate among males was 84.46% and females was 66.49%.

== Climate ==
Panchkhal has average temperatures of 24.9 °C and the average low is 11.66 °C throughout the year. Temperatures may rise up to 38 °C in the summer season and winters are generally dry with a record low temperature of -10 °C in 2008. Average rainfall is about 10.2 cm throughout the year. Rainfall is mostly monsoon-based (about 65% of the annual rainfall occurs during the monsoon months of June to August) and it decreases substantially (100 to 200 cm (39 to 79 in)) from eastern Nepal to western Nepal. In the winter season it rarely rains which creates harsh conditions for farmers who mainly depend on rain for irrigation.

Climate data for Panchkhal, elevation 865 m (2,838 ft), (1991–2020 normals)
Month	Jan	Feb	Mar	Apr	May	Jun	Jul	Aug	Sep	Oct	Nov	Dec	Year
Mean daily maximum °C (°F)	21.3 (70.3)	24.1 (75.4)	27.9 (82.2)	31.0 (87.8)	32.1 (89.8)	31.6 (88.9)	31.9 (89.4)	32.0 (89.6)	31.3 (88.3)	29.7 (85.5)	26.1 (79.0)	22.5 (72.5)	28.5 (83.2)
Daily mean °C (°F)	12.8 (55.0)	15.3 (59.5)	18.7 (65.7)	22.2 (72.0)	24.9 (76.8)	26.5 (79.7)	27.2 (81.0)	27.3 (81.1)	26.2 (79.2)	22.8 (73.0)	18.1 (64.6)	14.2 (57.6)	21.3 (70.4)
Mean daily minimum °C (°F)	4.2 (39.6)	6.4 (43.5)	9.5 (49.1)	13.4 (56.1)	17.6 (63.7)	21.3 (70.3)	22.5 (72.5)	22.5 (72.5)	21.1 (70.0)	15.9 (60.6)	10.0 (50.0)	5.8 (42.4)	14.2 (57.5)
Average precipitation mm (inches)	11.8 (0.46)	16.9 (0.67)	21.4 (0.84)	44.2 (1.74)	98.1 (3.86)	202.2 (7.96)	291.3 (11.47)	286.4 (11.28)	165.3 (6.51)	51.0 (2.01)	7.6 (0.30)	13.4 (0.53)	1,209.6 (47.63)
Source 1: Department of Hydrology and Meteorology
Source 2: JICA (precipitation)

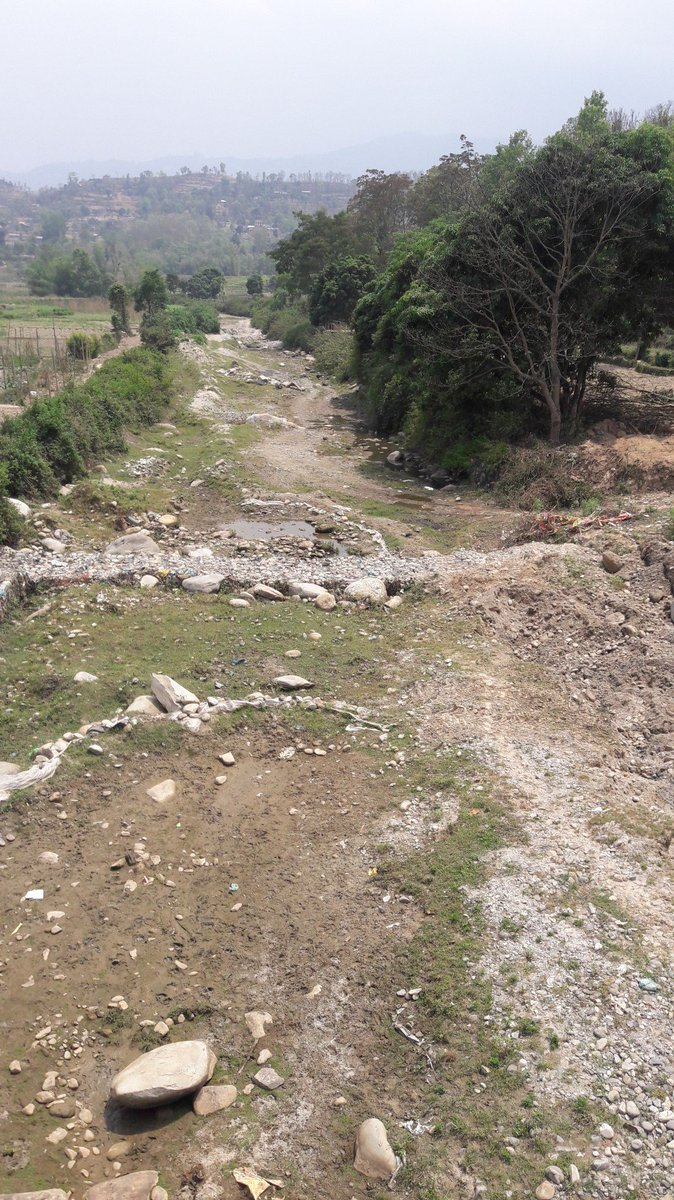
Drying water resources in Panchkhal

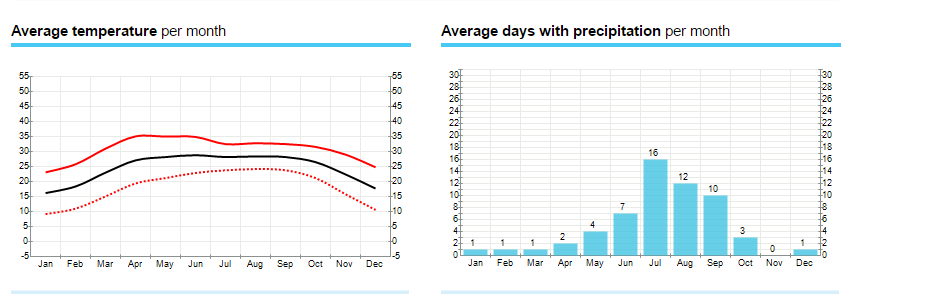
Statics of climatic summary of Panchkhal

== Economy ==
=== Tourism ===
Palanchok Bhagwati temple, a religious and tourist attraction, is located in Panchkhal Municipality and lies about a half-hour ride from the core area of Panchkhal Bazaar. It houses a shrine dedicated to the goddess of the same name, who has 18 arms and is believed to protect from danger and misfortune. The temple dates to 503 AD.

Panchkhal is near the tourist destinations of Dhulikhel and Panauti, and its natural environment and the culture and traditions of the local people attract tourists. Panchkhal shares some resorts with Dhulikhel.

=== Special Economic Zone ===
A budget of Rs 1.2 billion has been estimated for the construction of SEZ in Panchkhal. The construction of infrastructure at the Panchkhal economic zone, touted as a major facility to promote trade with China. The government has already acquired 1,000 ropanis of land—600 ropanis from the Devisthan Padula Subarnashwori Community Forest and 400 ropanis from the Sikharpur Community Forest. The Industry Ministry has paid Rs200 million to the Ministry of Forest for the land. If the SEZ is brought into operation, more than 50 large factories can be operated there. It can also provide warehousing facilities for goods imported from China.

The Nepal government has a plan to add oil depots in Panchkhal.

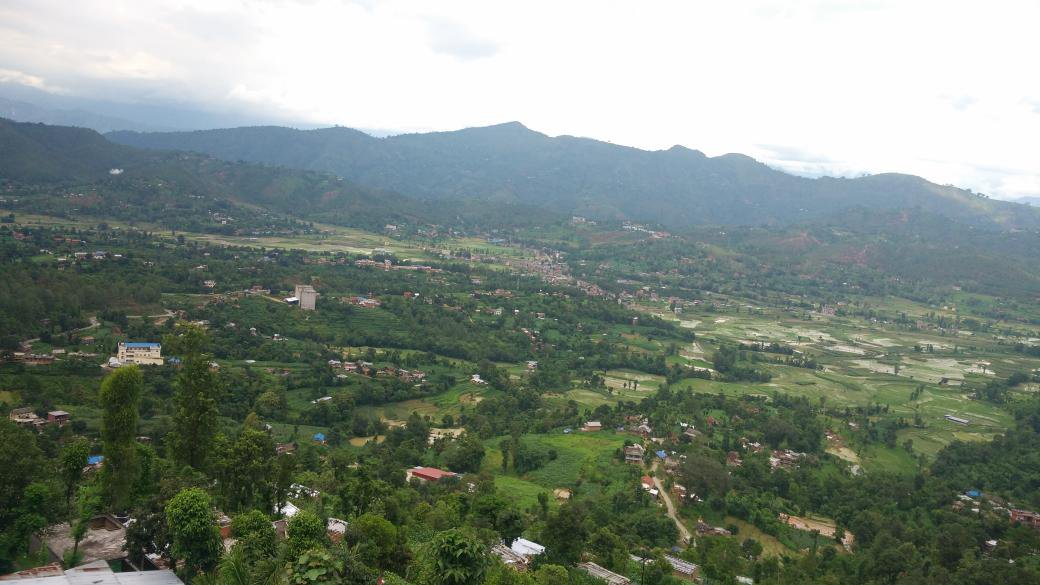
Fertile Panchkhal Valley

== Educational facilities ==
Panchkhal municipality has multiple public and private educational institutions. Of those, some public schools are:

- Shree Sarbamangala Higher Secondary School
- Shree Azad Secondary School

== Army Base ==
Nepal Army Birendra Peace Operations Training Centre (BPOTC) is a training institute of Nepal which is dedicated for providing training to all Nepalese Army personnel participating in various UNPKO.

The Nepalese Army established an ad hoc "Peace Keeping Training Camp" in 1986, which was subsequently restructured into a dedicated Training centre in 2001. It was renamed as Birendra Peace Operations Training Center with the motto "PEACE WITH HONOUR".
