= Bajura 1 =

Parliamentary constituency in Nepal

- Parliamentary constituency for the House of Representatives
- Bajura 1 in Sudurpashchim Province; Protected areas in green

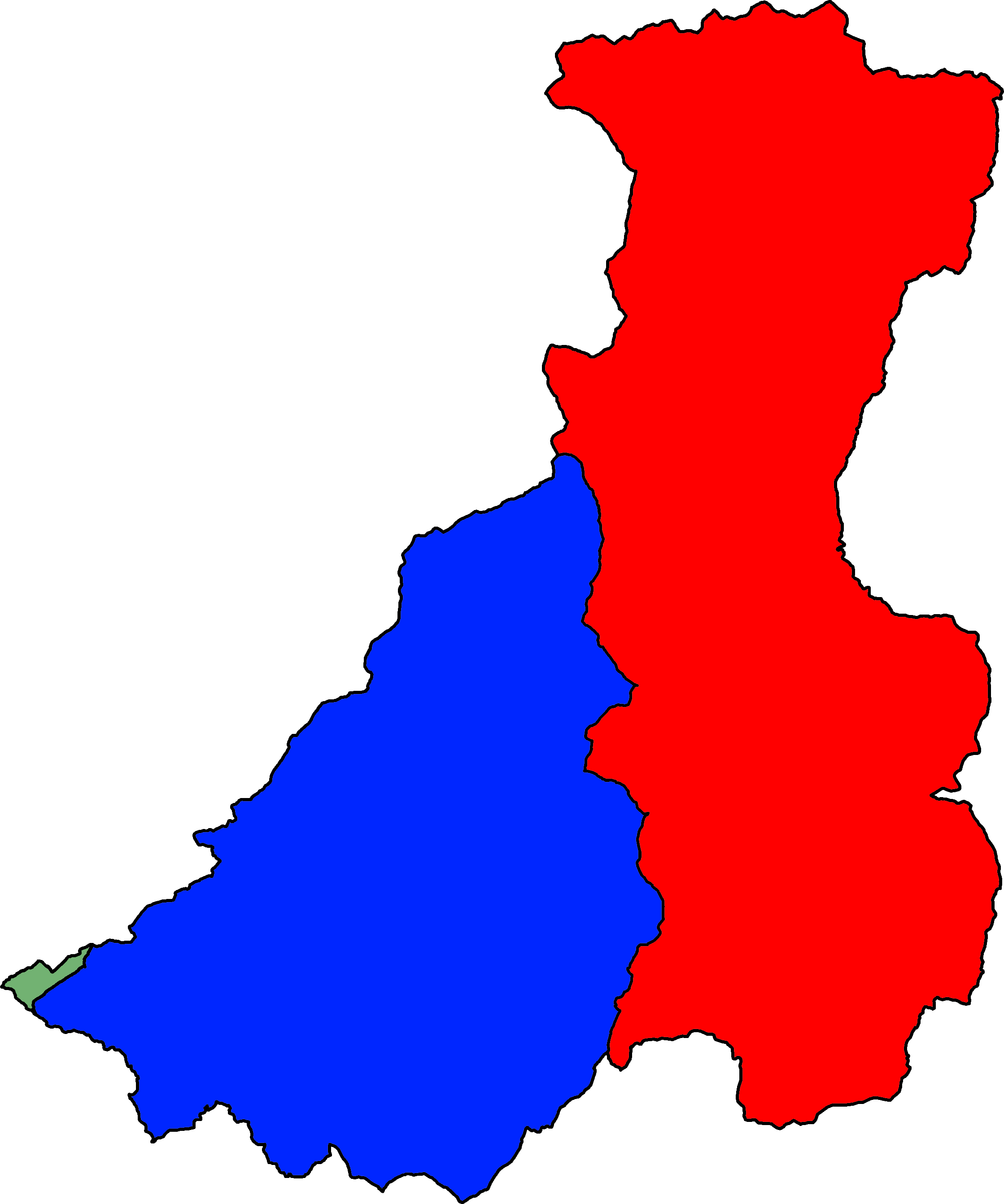
- Assembly segments Bajura 1(A) (red) and Bajura 1(B) (blue) within Bajura District; Protected areas in green
- Province: Sudurpashchim Province
- District: Bajura District
- Electorate: 69,834

Current constituency
- Created: 1991
- MP: Janak Raj Giri (Congress)
- Sudurpashchim MPA 1(A): Bal Dev Regmi (NCP)
- Sudurpashchim MPA 1(B): Prakash Bahadur Shah (NCP)

Bajura 1 is the parliamentary constituency of Bajura District in Nepal. This constituency came into existence on the Constituency Delimitation Commission (CDC) report submitted on 31 August 2017.

== Incorporated areas ==
Bajura 1 incorporates the entirety of Bajura District.

== Assembly segments ==
It encompasses the following Sudurpashchim Provincial Assembly segment

- Bajura 1(A)
- Bajura 1(B)

== Members of Parliament ==
=== Parliament/Constituent Assembly ===
Election	Member	Party
1991	Dev Raj Joshi	Nepali Congress
1994	Hikmat Bahadur Shahi	CPN (Unified Marxist–Leninist)
March 1998	Hikmat Bahadur Shahi	CPN (Marxist–Leninist)
1999	Janak Raj Giri	Nepali Congress
2008	Dev Raj Joshi	Nepali Congress
2013	Karna Bahadur Thapa	CPN (Unified Marxist–Leninist)
2017	Lal Bahadur Thapa	CPN (Unified Marxist–Leninist)
May 2018	Lal Bahadur Thapa	Nepal Communist Party
March 2021	Lal Bahadur Thapa	CPN (Unified Marxist–Leninist)
2022	Badri Pandey	Nepali Congress
2026	Janak Raj Giri	Nepali Congress

=== Provincial Assembly ===
==== 1(A) ====
Election	Member	Party
2017	Bal Dev Regmi	CPN (Unified Marxist-Leninist)
May 2018	Bal Dev Regmi	Nepal Communist Party

==== 1(B) ====
Election	Member	Party
2017	Prakash Bahadur Shah	CPN (Unified Marxist-Leninist)
May 2018	Prakash Bahadur Shah	Nepal Communist Party

== Election results ==
=== Election in the 2020s ===
==== 2026 general election ====
Candidate	Party	Votes	%
Janak Raj Giri	Nepali Congress	17,173	38.92
Lal Bahadur Thapa	CPN (UML)	16,633	37.70
Hemraj Thapa	Rastriya Swatantra Party	6,035	13.68
Prakash Bahadur Shah	Nepali Communist Party	3,428	7.77
Keshar Bahadur Shahi	Rastriya Prajatantra Party	352	0.80
Bhupendra Lwar	CPN (Maoist)	333	0.75
Deepak Kumar D.C.	Pragatisheel Loktantrik Party	97	0.22
Upendra Shahi	Independent	72	0.16
Total		44,123	100.00
Majority		540	
Nepali Congress hold			

==== 2022 general election ====
Candidate	Party	Votes	%
Badri Pandey	Nepali Congress	31,786	54.31
Karna Bahadur Thapa	CPN (UML)	26,349	45.02
Others		394	0.67
Total		58,529	100.00
Majority		5,437	
Nepali Congress gain			

=== Election in the 2010s ===
==== 2017 legislative elections ====
Party	Candidate	Votes
CPN (Unified Marxist–Leninist)	Lal Bahadur Thapa	28,065
Nepali Congress	Kavi Raj Pandit	23,181
Naya Shakti Party, Nepal	Dilip Kumar Shahi	465
Result	CPN (UML) hold	
Source: Election Commission

==== 2017 Nepalese provincial elections ====
===== 1(A) =====
Party	Candidate	Votes
CPN (Unified Marxist-Leninist)	Bal Dev Regmi	9,840
Nepali Congress	Janak Raj Giri	8,301
Others		239
Invalid votes		583
Result	CPN (UML) gain	
Source: Election Commission

===== 1(B) =====
Party	Candidate	Votes
CPN (Unified Marxist-Leninist)	Prakash Bahadur Shah	18,186
Nepali Congress	Padam Bahadur Shahi	14,977
Others		207
Invalid votes		908
Result	CPN (UML) gain	
Source: Election Commission

==== 2013 Constituent Assembly election ====
Party	Candidate	Votes
CPN (Unified Marxist–Leninist)	Karna Bahadur Thapa	22,458
Nepali Congress	Man Bahadur Rawal	18,125
UCPN (Maoist)	Sahadev Bojati	5,613
Others		1,395
Result	CPN (UML) gain	
Source: NepalNews

=== Election in the 2000s ===
==== 2008 Constituent Assembly election ====
Party	Candidate	Votes
Nepali Congress	Dev Raj Joshi	19,271
CPN (Unified Marxist–Leninist)	Karna Bahadur Thapa	18,469
CPN (Maoist)	Min Bahadur Bista	13,155
Rastriya Prajatantra Party	Jang Kumar Giri	1,386
Others		2,248
Invalid votes		1,489
Result	Congress hold	
Source: Election Commission

=== Election in the 1990s ===
==== 1999 legislative elections ====
Party	Candidate	Votes
Nepali Congress	Janak Raj Giri	23,129
CPN (Unified Marxist–Leninist)	Karna Bahadur Thapa	11,063
CPN (Marxist–Leninist)	Hikmat Bahadur Shahi	9,110
Others		1,366
Invalid votes		1,100
Result	Congress gain	
Source: Election Commission

==== 1994 legislative elections ====
Party	Candidate	Votes
CPN (Unified Marxist–Leninist)	Hikmat Bahadur Shahi	21,013
Nepali Congress	Dev Raj Joshi	19,503
Rastriya Prajatantra Party	Bijaya Bahadur Shah	1,211
Others		675
Result	CPN (UML) gain	
Source: Election Commission

==== 1991 legislative elections ====
Party	Candidate	Votes
Nepali Congress	Dev Raj Joshi	17,066
CPN (Unified Marxist–Leninist)		12,483
Result	Congress gain	

== See also ==
- List of parliamentary constituencies of Nepal
