= Morang 6 =

Parliamentary constituency in Nepal

- Parliamentary constituency
- Morang 6 in Province No. 1
- Province: Koshi
- District: Morang District

Current constituency
- Created: 1991
- Member of Parliament: Rubina Acharya, (RSP 2026 A.D.)
- Member of the Provincial Assembly: Jeevan Acharya, (CPN-MC)
- Member of the Provincial Assembly: Kedar Karki, (NC)

Morang 6 is one of six parliamentary constituencies of Morang District in Nepal. This constituency came into existence on the Constituency Delimitation Commission (CDC) report submitted on 31 August 2017.

== Incorporated areas ==
Morang 6 incorporates Budhiganga Rural Municipality, wards 2–7 of Sundarharaicha Municipality and wards 4–7, 9, 11 and 12 of Biratnagar Metropolitan City.

== Assembly segments ==
It encompasses the following Province No. 1 Provincial Assembly segment

- Morang 6(A)

It incorporates Budhiganga Rural Municipality, wards 2-7 of Sundar Haraicha municipality and ward 4 of Biratnagar metropolitan city

- Morang 6(B)

It incorporates wards 5-7,9,11, and 12 of Biratnagar metropolitan city

== Members of Parliament ==
=== Parliament/Constituent Assembly ===
Election	Member	Party
1991	Shyam Lal Tawedar	Nepali Congress
1994	Guru Prasad Baral	CPN (Unified Marxist–Leninist)
1999	Hari Narayan Chaudhary	Nepali Congress
2008	Bhim Raj Chaudhary Rajbanshi	Madheshi Janaadhikar Forum, Nepal
June 2009	Bhim Raj Chaudhary Rajbanshi	Madheshi Janaadhikar Forum, Nepal (Democratic)
2013	Mahesh Acharya	Nepali Congress
2017	Lal Babu Pandit	CPN (Unified Marxist–Leninist)
May 2018	Lal Babu Pandit	Nepal Communist Party
March 2021	Lal Babu Pandit	CPN (Unified Marxist–Leninist)
2022	Shekhar Koirala	Nepali Congress
2026	Rubina Acharya	Rastriya Swatantra Party

=== Provincial Assembly ===
==== 6(A) ====
Election	Member	Party
2017	Chum Narayan Tavdar	Nepali Congress
2022	Jeevan Acharya	CPN (Maoist Centre)

==== 6(B) ====
Election	Member	Party
2017	Kedar Karki	Nepali Congress

== Election results ==
=== Election in the 2020s ===
==== 2026 general election ====
Candidate	Party	Votes	%
Rubina Acharya	Rastriya Swatantra Party	55,513	65.21
Shekhar Koirala	Nepali Congress	12,850	15.09
Binod Prasad Dhakal	CPN (UML)	8,317	9.77
Matrika Paudel	Shram Sanskriti Party	3,400	3.99
Savin Niraula	Rastriya Prajatantra Party	2,092	2.46
Opendra Kumar Raya	Nepali Communist Party	1,716	2.02
Others		1,242	1.46
Total		85,130	100.00
Majority		42,663	
Rastriya Swatantra Party gain			

==== 2022 general election ====
Candidate	Party	Votes	%
Shekhar Koirala	Nepali Congress	35,224	43.80
Lal Babu Pandit	CPN (UML)	22,946	28.53
Yadav Kumar Pradhan	Rastriya Swatantra Party	9,140	11.36
Gopal Kshetri	Rastriya Prajatantra Party	8,925	11.10
Buddhi Ram Majhi	Janamat Party	1,844	2.29
Others		2,347	2.92
Total		80,426	100.00
Majority		12,278	
Nepali Congress gain			

=== Election in the 2010s ===
==== 2017 legislative elections ====
Party	Candidate	Votes
CPN (Unified Marxist–Leninist)	Lal Babu Pandit	33,941
Nepali Congress	Dr. Shekhar Koirala	33,266
Federal Socialist Forum, Nepal	Rajeshwar Bishwas	5,261
Rastriya Janata Party Nepal	Tavrej Akhtar Aalam	1,118
Others		1,277
Invalid votes		4,255
Result	CPN (UML) gain	
Source: Election Commission

==== 2017 Nepalese provincial elections ====
===== 6(A) =====
Party	Candidate	Votes
Nepali Congress	Chum Narayan Tavdar	23,513
CPN (Maoist Centre)	Jiwan Acharya	21,470
Federal Socialist Forum, Nepal	Nira Bhagat	1,710
Others		1,705
Invalid votes		1,857
Result	Congress gain	
Source: Election Commission

===== 6(B) =====
Party	Candidate	Votes
Nepali Congress	Kedar Karki	11,298
CPN (Unified Marxist–Leninist)	Ramesh Prasad Pokharel	8,120
Federal Socialist Forum, Nepal	Shyam Kumar Kamat	4,921
Rastriya Janata Party Nepal	Yadubamsha Shah Haluwai	1,203
Others		1,596
Invalid votes		1,532
Result	Congress gain	
Source: Election Commission

==== 2013 Constituent Assembly election ====
Party	Candidate	Votes
Nepali Congress	Mahesh Acharya	12,552
Madheshi Janaadhikar Forum, Nepal (Democratic)	Bhakti Nath Majhi Tharu	7,568
CPN (Unified Marxist–Leninist)	Mahesh Prasad Bhattarai	5,600
Madheshi Janaadhikar Forum, Nepal	Mrityuanjay Kumar Jha	5,327
UCPN (Maoist)	Babu Raja Ojha	4,287
Rastriya Prajatantra Party Nepal	Ballabh Prasad Dahal	3,536
Terai Madhesh Loktantrik Party	Mohammad Kadir	1,020
Others		2,224
Result	Congress gain	
Source: NepalNews

=== Election in the 2000s ===
==== 2008 Constituent Assembly election ====
Party	Candidate	Votes
Madheshi Janaadhikar Forum, Nepal	Bhim Raj Chaudhary Rajbanshi	17,086
Nepali Congress	Mahesh Acharya	11,558
CPN (Unified Marxist–Leninist)	Mahesh Regmi	7,272
CPN (Maoist)	Hirad Lal Chaudhary	3,399
Others		3,337
Invalid votes		2,047
Result	MJFN gain	
Source: Election Commission

=== Election in the 1990s ===
==== 1999 legislative elections ====
Party	Candidate	Votes
Nepali Congress	Hari Narayan Chaudhary	22,856
CPN (Unified Marxist–Leninist)	Guru Prasad Baral	18,612
Nepal Sadbhawana Party	Babu Nand Yadav	4,045
CPN (Marxist–Leninist)	Hari Prasad Ghimire	2,354
Rastriya Prajatantra Party	Bhusan Ram Mandal	1,554
Others		861
Invalid Votes		1,693
Result	Congress gain	
Source: Election Commission

==== 1994 legislative elections ====
Party	Candidate	Votes
CPN (Unified Marxist–Leninist)	Guru Prasad Baral	15,460
Nepali Congress	Satya Narayan Chaudhary	13,858
Rastriya Prajatantra Party	Bhushan Raj Mandal	5,646
Nepal Sadbhawana Party	Ram Narayan Yadav	2,885
Others		737
Result	CPN (UML) gain	
Source: Election Commission

==== 1991 legislative elections ====
Party	Candidate	Votes
Nepali Congress	Shyam Lal Tawedar	23,931
CPN (Unified Marxist–Leninist)	Mohan Chandra Adhikari	14,486
Result	Congress gain	

== See also ==
- List of parliamentary constituencies of Nepal
