= Ganesh Karki =

Nepalese Politician

- गणेश कार्की

Member of the House of Representatives
- Elected
- Assumed office 27 March 2026
- Preceded by: Sunil Sharma
- Constituency: Morang 3

Personal details
- Citizenship: Nepalese
- Party: Rastriya Swatantra Party
- Education: Environmental Studies at (Norwegian University of Life Sciences)
- Occupation: Politician

Ganesh Karki (Note: Nepali: गणेश कार्की) is a Nepalese politician serving as a member of parliament from the Rastriya Swatantra Party. He is the member of the 3rd Federal Parliament of Nepal elected from Morang 3 constituency in 2026 Nepalese General Election securing 36,924 votes and defeating Sunil Kumar Sharma of the Nepali Congress. He is also a central committee member of the Rastriya Swatantra Party playing a key role in Party policy formulation.
