= Lal Bahadur Thapa =

Nepalese politician

- लाल बहादुर थापा

Member of Parliament, Pratinidhi Sabha
- In office 4 March 2018 – 18 September 2022
- Preceded by: Karna Bahadur Thapa (as Member of the Constituent Assembly)
- Succeeded by: Badri Pandey
- Constituency: Bajura 1

Personal details
- Born: 26 August 1967 (age 58)
- Party: CPN (UML)

Lal Bahadur Thapa is a Nepali politician and a member of the House of Representatives of the federal parliament of Nepal. He was elected under the first-past-the-post system representing CPN UML of the left alliance, in Bajura-1 constituency. He defeated his nearest rival, Kabiraj Pandit of Nepali Congress, by acquiring 28,065 votes to Pandit's 23,181.
