= Raja Ram Karki =

Nepali politician (1956/1957 – 2023)

Honourable Raja Ram Karki
- राजाराम कार्की

Province Assembly Member of Bagmati Province
- In office 2017 – 23 August 2023
- Preceded by: Assembly created

Personal details
- Born: 1957 Dhading, Bagmati Province, Nepal
- Died: 23 August 2023 (aged 66)
- Party: Nepali Congress

Raja Ram Karki (Nepali: डा. राजाराम कार्की; c. 1957 – 23 August 2023) was a Nepali politician belonging to Nepali Congress. He also served as member of the Bagmati Province Provincial Assembly. Karki vied for the post of general secretary of Nepali Congress in 14th general convention of Nepali Congress from Bimalendra Nidhi panel.

== Political life ==
Karki was a member of Central working committee of Nepali Congress. Karki also served as general secretary of Nepal Tarun Dal.

== Death ==
Raja Ram Karki died on 23 August 2023, at the age of 66.
