= Minakshi Jha =

Nepalese politician

Honourable Minakshi Jha
- मिनाक्क्षी झा

Member of Parliament, Pratinidhi Sabha for Nepali Congress party list
- Incumbent
- Assumed office 4 March 2018

Member of 1st and 2nd Constituent Assembly for Nepali Congress party list
- In office 28 May 2008 – 14 October 2017

Personal details
- Born: 8 June 1959 (age 67) Dhanusha District
- Party: Nepali Congress

Minakshi Jha (Nepali: मिनाक्षी झा) is a Nepali politician and a member of the House of Representatives of the federal parliament of Nepal. She was elected under the proportional representation system from Nepali Congress. She has also served as member of both the constituent assemblies.

Jha was elected with third highest popular vote to NC central working committee from 14th general convention of Nepali Congress. She is one of the closest leader to NC Vice president Bimalendra Nidhi.
