= Ministry of Science, Technology and Environment (Nepal) =

Government ministry of Nepal

Agency overview
- Minister responsible: Bisendra Paswan
- Website: moest.gov.np

Ministry of Science, Technology and Environment (1976) is the government body for sustainable and broad based economic growth contributing to employment generation and poverty reduction in Nepal.
