= Rajanra KC =

Nepali politician

Rajan KC
- राजन के. सी.
- Incumbent
- Assumed office 2008
- Constituency: Kathmandu–10

Personal details
- Party: Nepali Congress

Rajendra KC (Popular Name Rajan KC) (Nepali: राजन केसी) is a leader of Nepali Congress party and newly elected member of Constituent Assembly in Nepal. KC defeated UCPN Maoist Chairman Prachanda in Kathmandu Constituency number ten.

KC who is the member of the extended committee of Nepali Congress was elected in various position of local government including the member of Kirtipur Municipality and Council member of Kathmandu District Development in the past.

KC holds master's degree in Economics. He was born 58 years ago in Chobhar of Kathmandu.
