= Kiran Yadav =

Nepali Politician

Honourable Kiran Yadav
- किरण यादव

Member of Constituent Assembly
- In office 2013–2017
- Constituency: Mahottari 2

Personal details
- Party: Nepali Congress
- Occupation: Politician

Kiran Yadav is a Nepali politician belonging to Nepali Congress. She is the former member of 2nd Nepalese Constituent Assembly having been elected from Mahottari 2.

== Electoral history ==
=== 2013 Constituent Assembly election ===
| Party | Candidate | Votes |
|---|---|---|
| Nepali Congress | Kiran Yadav | 7,357 |
| Rastriya Madhesh Samajbadi Party | Jainul Rain | 5,521 |
| Terai Madhes Loktantrik Party | Rupa Kumari Yadav | 4,048 |
| Sadbhavana Party | Janai Sharan Sah | 3,934 |
| CPN (Unified Marxist–Leninist) | Manju Kumari Yadav | 2,514 |
| UCPN (Maoist) | Hari Narayan Yadav | 2,391 |
| Madheshi Janaadhikar Forum, Nepal | Lal Babu Yadav | 2,379 |
| Others | | 4,184 |
| Result | Congress gain | |
Source: NepalNews
