= Sathighar Bhagawati =

Sathighar Bhagawati साठीघर भगवती
- Location in Nepal
- Coordinates: 27.63°N 85.67°E
- Country: Nepal
- Zone: Bagmati Zone
- District: Kabhrepalanchok District

Population (1991)
  - Total: 2,732
- Time zone: UTC+5:45 (Nepal Time)

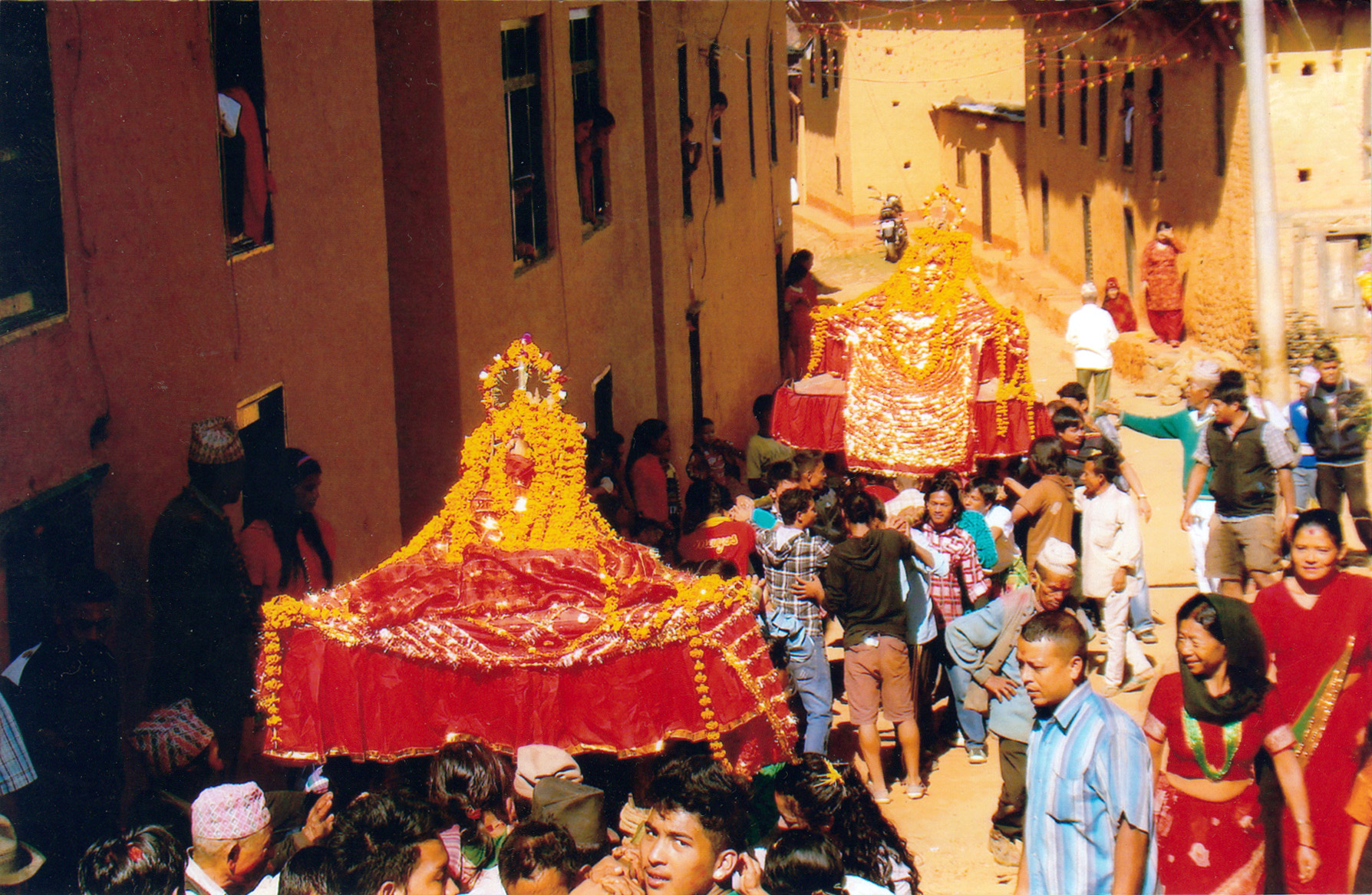
Men carrying portable shrines of goddesses Mahakali (foreground) and Palanchok Bhagwati through the streets of Sathighar Bhagawati village in Kavrepalanchok, Nepal during the festival of Palanchok Bhagwati Jatra on 25 October 2012.

Sathighar Bhagawati is a market place in Panchkhal Municipality in Kabhrepalanchok District in the Bagmati Zone of central Nepal. It was merged to form the new municipality along with Panchkhal, Deuvumi Baluwa, Anaikot and Sathighar Bhagawati village development committee on 18 May 2014. At the time of the 1991 Nepal census it had a population of 2732 in 534 individual households.
