= Anaikot =

Anaikot अनैकोट
- Location in Nepal
- Coordinates: 27°40′48″N 85°36′0″E
- Country: Nepal
- Province: Bagmati Province
- District: Kavrepalanchok District

Population (1991)
  - Total: 4,990
- Time zone: UTC+5:45 (Nepal Time)

Anaikot (Nepali: अनैकोट) is a market place in Panchkhal Municipality in Kavrepalanchok District in Bagmati Province of central Nepal. It was merged to form the new municipality along with Panchkhal, Deuvumi Baluwa, Anaikot and Sathighar Bhagawati village development committee on 18 May 2014. At the 1991 Nepal census it had a population of 4990 and had 890 houses.

== Schools ==
- Shree Kalika Higher Secondary School
- Shree Gyaneshwari Secondary School
- Shree Shrijana Primary School
