= Jeep Tshering Lama =

Nepali politician

- जिप छिरिङ लामा

Member of Parliament, Pratinidhi Sabha for Nepali Congress party list
- Incumbent
- Assumed office 4 March 2018

Member of Constituent Assembly for Nepali Congress party list
- In office 28 May 2008 – 28 May 2012

Personal details
- Born: 1955 (age 70–71) Dolakha District
- Party: Nepali Congress

Jeep Tshering Lama (alt. forename: Jip; alt. middle names: Tsering, Chiring, Chhiring) is a Nepali politician and a member of the House of Representatives of the federal parliament of Nepal. He was elected from Nepali Congress under the proportional representation system, against a reserved seat for indigenous groups.

== Social works ==
In 2018, he donated 5 ambulances to local governments in Dolakha district.
