= Rangamati Shahi =

Nepali politician

- रंगमती शाही

Member of Parliament, Pratinidhi Sabha for Nepali Congress party list
- Incumbent
- Assumed office 4 March 2018

Personal details
- Born: 20 November 1973 (age 52) Humla District
- Party: Nepali Congress

Rangamati Shahi (also Rangmati Shahi) is a Nepali politician and a member of the House of Representatives of the federal parliament of Nepal. She was elected from Nepali Congress under the proportional representation system, filling the seat reserved for the backward regions of the country. She is also a member of the parliamentary Development and Technology Committee. She is also a member of the Ministry of Sports and Youth in the shadow cabinet of Nepali Congress.
