= Anil Kumar Rungata =

Nepali politician

Honourable Anil Kumar Rungata
- अनिल कुमार रुङ्गटा

Member of Constituent Assembly
- In office 2013–2017
- Constituency: Nominated

Personal details
- Party: Nepali Congress
- Occupation: Politician

Anil Kumar Rungata is a Nepali politician and businessman and politician belonging to Nepali Congress. He is the former member of 2nd Nepalese Constituent Assembly having been nominated by president.
