= Sujata Pariyar =

Nepalese politician

- सुजाता परियार

Member of Parliament, Pratinidhi Sabha for Nepali Congress party list
- Incumbent
- Assumed office 4 March 2018

Member of Constituent Assembly for Nepali Congress party list
- In office 21 January 2014 – 14 October 2017

Personal details
- Born: 15 February 1973 (age 53)
- Party: Nepali Congress

Sujata Pariyar is a Nepalese politician, belonging to the Nepali Congress currently serving as the member of the 1st Federal Parliament of Nepal. In the 2017 Nepalese general election she was elected as a proportional representative from Dalit category.
