= Laxmi Pariyar =

Nepali politician

- लक्ष्मी परियार

Member of Parliament, Pratinidhi Sabha for Nepali Congress party list
- Incumbent
- Assumed office 4 March 2018

Member of Constituent Assembly for Nepali Congress party list
- In office 28 May 2008 – 28 May 2012

Personal details
- Born: July 10, 1977 (age 48)
- Party: Nepali Congress

Laxmi Pariyar is a Nepali politician and a member of the House of Representatives of the federal parliament of Nepal. She was elected under the proportional representation system of the Nepali Congress. She leads the Ministry of Land Reform in the Nepali Congress shadow cabinet.

She is a member of the Nepali Congress Central Working Committee.
