= Jiwan Pariyar =

Nepali politician

- जीवन परियार

Deputy General Secretary of Nepali Congress
- Incumbent
- Assumed office 2021
- President: Sher Bahadur Deuba
- Preceded by: Prakash Sharan Mahat

Member of House of Representatives
- Incumbent
- Assumed office 2022
- Constituency: Party list

Member of 2nd Nepalese Constituent Assembly
- In office 2013–2017
- Constituency: Proportional list

Personal details
- Born: Kaski, Gandaki Province, Nepal
- Party: Nepali Congress

Jiwan Pariyar (Nepali: जीवन परियार) is a Nepali politician belonging to the Nepali Congress. Pariyar currently serves as member of House of Representatives.

He is the elected deputy general secretary of the Nepali Congress party elected by 14th general convention of Nepali Congress.

== Political life ==
Pariyar was elected to the post under dalit quota. He's also the member of 2nd Nepalese Constituent Assembly elected under proportional list.

== Electoral history ==
=== 2017 Nepalese provincial elections ===
Kaski 1(A)

Party	Candidate	Votes
Communist Party of Nepal (Maoist Centre)	Dipak Koirala	18,727
Nepali Congress	Jiwan Pariyar	15,081
Others		2,462
Invalid votes		632
Result	Maoist Centre gain	
Source: Election Commission
