= List of monuments in Sunsari, Nepal =

This is a list of monuments in Sunsari District, Nepal as officially recognized by and available through the website of the Department of Archaeology, Nepal. Sunsari is a district of Province No. 1 and is located in eastern Nepal. Hindu temples are the main attraction of this district.

== List of monuments ==
ID	Name	Type	Location	District	Coordinates	Image
NP-SUN-01	Pindeshwor Temple		Dharan	Sunsari	26°48′47″N 87°17′39″E	Pindeshwor Temple Upload Photo
NP-SUN-02	Bishnupaduka			Sunsari	26°50′56″N 87°15′54″E	Bishnupaduka Upload Photo
NP-SUN-03	Sunsarimai Temple			Sunsari		Upload Photo Upload Photo
NP-SUN-04	Bindhyabaasini Temple			Sunsari		Upload Photo Upload Photo
NP-SUN-05	Saguri Fort		Vijaypur	Sunsari		Upload Photo Upload Photo
NP-SUN-06	Bijayapur Darbar Ruins		Vijaypur	Sunsari	26°50′03″N 87°17′52″E	Upload Photo Upload Photo
NP-SUN-07	Dantakali Temple		Dharan Road	Sunsari	26°48′48″N 87°17′23″E	Dantakali Temple Upload Photo
NP-SUN-08	Barahakshetra Temple		Barahakshetra	Sunsari	26°52′35″N 87°09′58″E	Barahakshetra Temple Upload Photo
NP-SUN-09	Budha Subba Temple		Sunsari	Sunsari	26°49′23″N 87°17′37″E	Budha Subba Temple Upload Photo

== See also ==
- List of monuments in Province No. 1
- List of monuments in Nepal
