= Aaren Rai =

Nepalese politician

Honourable Aaren Rai
- आरेन राई
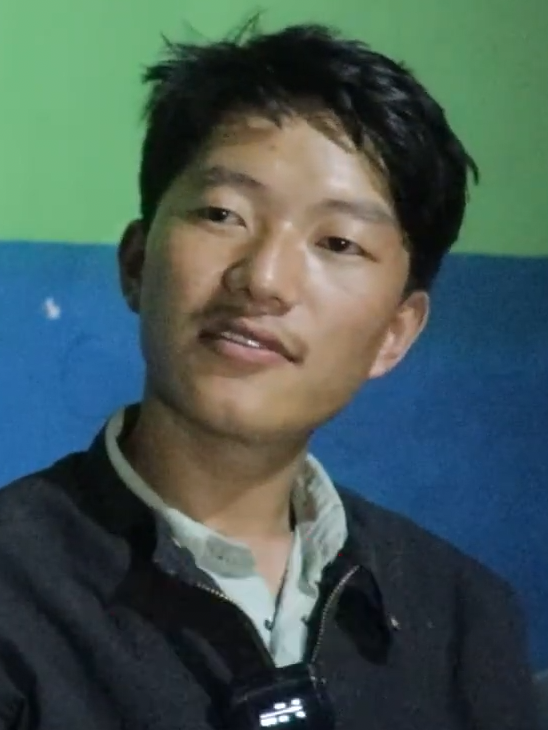

Member of Parliament, Pratinidhi Sabha
- Elected
- Assumed office March 2026
- Preceded by: Ram Kumar Rai
- Constituency: Khotang 1

General Secretary of Shram Sanskriti Party
- Incumbent
- Assumed office 28 September 2025

Personal details
- Born: 24 September 1996 (age 29) Khotang District, Nepal
- Party: Shram Sanskriti (since 2025)
- Other political affiliations: CPN (Maoist) (2017–19); MNO-DGG (2019–2025)
- Spouse: Pramila Bisuka
- Parents: Ekraj Rai (father); Pramila Rai (mother)

Aaren Rai is a Nepalese politician who has been the Member of Parliament (MP) for Khotang 1. He also serves as the general secretary for Shram Sanskriti Party.

== Early life ==
His mother was elected as a ward member at the 1997 local elections from CPN (UML).

== Political career ==
Rai was involved with the Unemployed Union and Nationalist Center Nepal when he was a student in Kathmandu. He became a member of UCPN (Maoist) in 2012. In 2017, Rai was a central committee member of Nationalist Center Nepal.

Rai joined the Mongol National Organisation-Dr. Gopal Gurung in 2019. He was as a member of the supreme assembly, and the head of the economic department of the party.

Rai became involved with Dharan mayor Harka Sampang during the 2024 Ilam–2 by-election. He joined the newly formed Shram Sanskriti Party as a general secretary in September 2025.

He was elected to the Pratinidhi Sabha from Khotang 1 at the 2026 general election.

== Personal life ==
Rai is married to Pramila Bisuka.
