= Shram Sanskriti Party =

Political party in Nepal

Shram Sanskriti Party श्रम संस्कृति पार्टी
- Abbreviation: SSP
- Chairperson: Harka Sampang
- General Secretary: Aaren Rai
- Spokesperson: Arun Gurung
- Founder: Harka Sampang
- Founded: 28 September 2025; 13 months ago
- Headquarters: Sukedhara, Kathmandu, Nepal
- Ideology: Harkabaad; Secularism; Republicanism; Anti-capitalism; Anti-establishment; Localism
- Colours: Brown
- Slogan: Jay Mato; Jay Shram Dan
- ECN Status: National Party (5th largest)
- Seats in Pratinidhi Sabha: 7 / 275
- Seats in Rastriya Sabha: 0 / 59
- Seats in Provincial Assemblies: 0 / 550
- Mayors/Chairs: 0 / 753
- Councillors: 1 / 35,011

Election symbol
- Soil in Hands

Website
- www.ssparty.org.np

The Shram Sanskriti Party (SSP; Nepali: श्रम संस्कृति पार्टी, lit. 'Labour Culture Party') is a political party in Nepal that was established by Harka Sampang, the former mayor of Dharan. Founded in 2025, the party won seven seats in the House of Representatives following the 2026 general election, becoming the fifth largest party in the lower house.

== History ==
=== Background and formation (2022–2025) ===
Harka Sampang was elected as mayor of Dharan as an independent in 2022, with a "working man" image and a platform of anti-corruption, public participation, and expanding access to drinking water. Under his mayoralty, Sampang gained popularity for organizing public work programmes in Dharan.

The party was formed following the Gen Z protests. It registered with the Election Commission of Nepal under the name Shram Sanskriti Party (SSP) on 28 September 2025.

=== 2026 general election ===
During the 2026 general election campaign, the party cleaned streets while canvassing. It won three direct seats in Eastern Nepal and four proportional seats in the election.

== Name and symbols ==
The party's name, Shram Sanskriti (Nepali: श्रम संस्कृति, lit. 'Labor Culture'), is based on the party's stated focus on public service. Its official symbol is two hands holding a mound of soil (Nepali: अन्जुलीमा रहेको माटो).

== Political positions ==
The party's ideology is based on "Harkabaad", a political philosophy influenced by Sampang's personal leadership style and a focus on local development and civic mobilization.

=== Economic issues ===
The party supports shifting from a "city-centric" development model that favors Kathmandu to a "village-centric" model focusing development of sustainable industries in rural areas. It supports transitioning into an export-based economy through national economic 5 year plans.

=== Legal issues ===
The party supports a governance with a directly elected president with a five-year term and a maximum of two terms.

=== Social issues ===
The party supports recognizing all indigenous languages in Nepal as national languages, allowing them to be used in education and government. It supports universal suffrage. It supports a secular state and does not endorse any religion. It has proposed an educational system with a three day school week and a greater focus on practical knowledge.

== Structure ==
The party is headquartered in Kathmandu and operates under a five member central office bearer and a 23 member committee.

As of November 2025, the party's chairman is Harka Sampang, its general secretary is Aryan Rai, its treasurer is Samita Rai, and its spokesperson is Arun Gurung.

== Demographics ==
During the 2026 elections, 35 of 109 candidates from the party were under the age of 40.

== Electoral performance ==
=== Federal parliament ===
Election	Leader	Constituency Votes		Proportional Votes		Seats	Position	Resulting government
Election	Leader	No.	%	No.	%	No.	Position	Resulting government
2026 (debut)	Harka Sampang	303,902	2.89	385,856	3.56	7 / 275	5th	In opposition

== Leadership ==
=== Chairman ===
- Harka Sampang (since 2025)
