= John Chamling Rai =

Nepali singer-songwriter

- Born: Jone Chamling Rai; November 5, 1998 (age 27); Dharan, Nepal
- Origin: Dharan, Nepal
- Genres: Pop; acoustic
- Occupations: Singer; songwriter
- Years active: 2020–present

John Chamling Rai (also credited as Jone Chamling Rai; born 5 November 1998), known professionally as John Rai, is a Nepali singer-songwriter from Dharan. He is the lead vocalist of the band John and the Locals, and is known for self-written songs including "Sadhana", "Hawa Jastai", and "Maya Garnu La", the last of which won him the Best Playback Singer award at the 2026 Radio Kantipur National Music Awards.

== Early life ==
Rai was born on 5 November 1998 in Dharan, Nepal. He was drawn to music from childhood, regularly singing at church alongside his father and performing at school events. He has cited the late Linkin Park vocalist Chester Bennington as a favourite singer and an influence on his music. His mother worked in Israel for fourteen years to support the family, an experience that later inspired his song "Sangharsha" ("Struggle"), which he dedicated to her.

== Career ==
=== Early career and rise on social media ===
While pursuing a bachelor's degree in corporate finance in Denmark, Rai continued writing and composing songs on the side, uncertain whether he could pursue music seriously. During a gathering with friends in Dharan, he performed a self-written song; a friend recorded it on a phone, and Rai uploaded the unedited footage to YouTube. The video circulated widely on social media, resonating particularly with Gen Z viewers, and he released his self-written debut single, "Prashna" ("Question"), in 2020.

His song "Sadhana", posted with minimal production, gained little attention for several months before suddenly going viral, after which he began receiving invitations to perform at concerts. He subsequently formed the backing band John and the Locals, with Shreehang Rai on lead guitar, Manuhang Rai on bass, Jasper Rai on drums, and Sudarshan Thapa on percussion and flute.

Rai spent time abroad on a student visa, working service-industry jobs, before returning to Nepal to pursue music full-time. His song "Hawa Jastai" ("Like the Wind") went on to receive millions of views.

=== Recognition ===
In June 2025, Rai's music video for "Parkhi Rahechhu" premiered at Purple Haze Rock Bar in Thamel, Kathmandu. Later that month, Prime Minister KP Sharma Oli congratulated Rai on the song's release during a meeting at the prime minister's residence in Baluwatar, describing him as an artist popular among Nepal's Gen Z audience.

In May 2026, Rai and his band performed to a crowd of several thousand at an outdoor concert in Jasbire, Ilam District, organised by the Helibodh Club as part of its annual programme to promote local tourism; attendees travelled from as far as Darjeeling, India, to attend.

In July 2026, Rai won the Best Playback Singer award for his song "Maya Garnu La" at the 8th Xtreme Energy Radio Kantipur National Music Awards, presented during Radio Kantipur's 28th anniversary celebration in Pulchowk, Lalitpur.

== Discography ==
Selected songs written and performed by Rai include:

- "Prashna" (2020)
- "Parkhi Rahechhu" (2022)
- "Ko Chha Ra" (2022)
- "Sadhana"
- "Nihit"
- "Hawa Jastai" (2023)
- "Samayale" (2023)
- "Sangharsha"
- "Bhagyamani Moh"
- "Maya Garnu La" (2026)

== Awards ==
Year	Award	Category	Work	Result
2026	Radio Kantipur National Music Awards	Best Playback Singer	"Maya Garnu La"	Won
