= Gurkha Memorial =

Gurkha Memorial may refer to:

- Gurkha Memorial, Aldershot, Rushmoor, Hampshire, England
- Gurkha Memorial, London, England
- Gurkha Memorial Garden, at Sir Harold Hillier Gardens, in Romsey, Hampshire, England
- Gurkha Memorial Park, Dharan, Nepal
- A statue at Menin Gate, Ypres, Belgium
