= Sahid Smarak =

Sahid Smarak (Nepali: सहिद स्मारक) is situated at the west of Hetauda city. It is one of the parks in the Hetauda.

== Madan Bhandari Sculpture ==
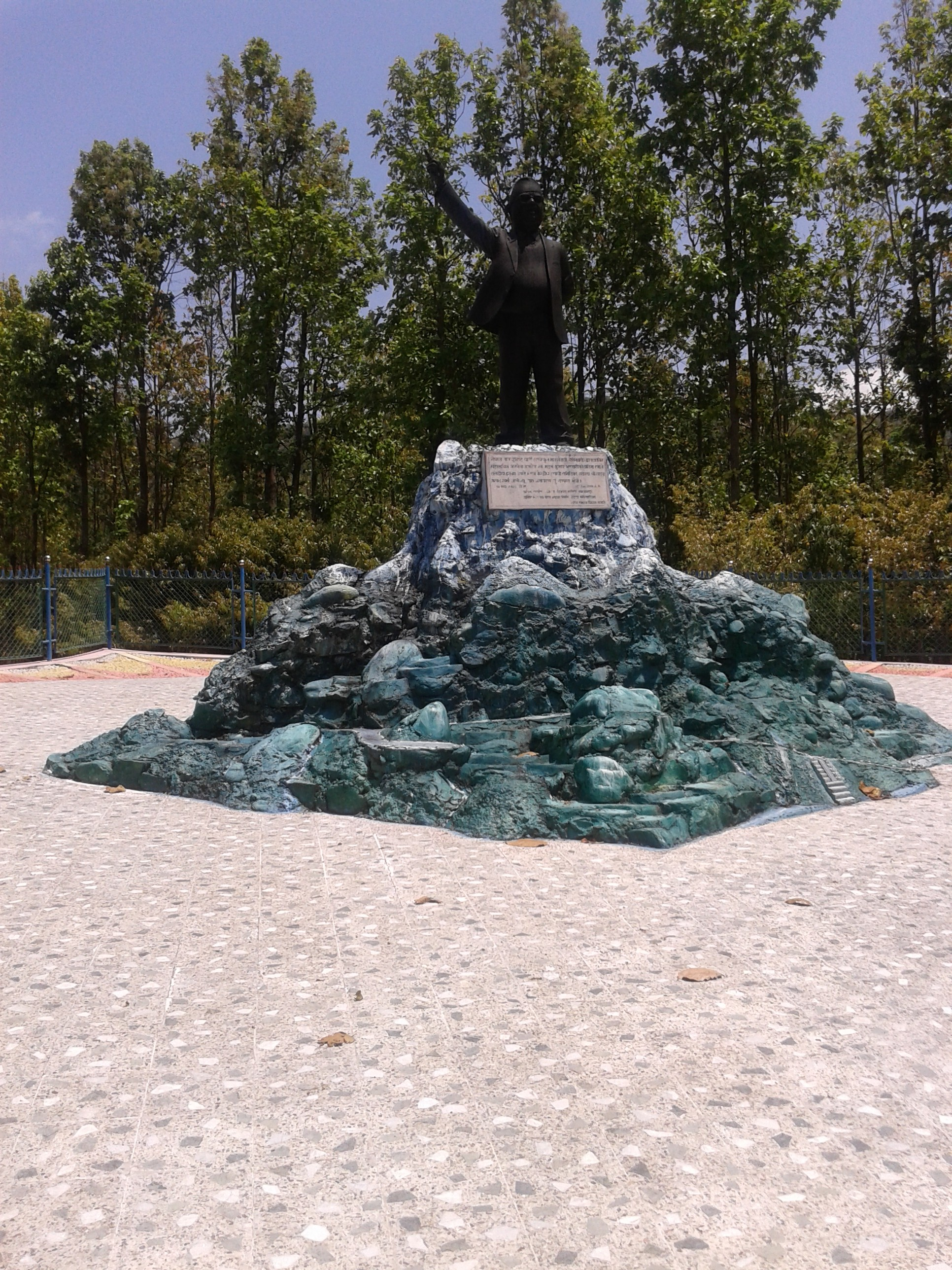
Madan Bhandari Sculpture

Madan Kumar Bhandari (Nepali: मदन कुमार भण्डारी) (June 27, 1952 – 1993) was a Nepalese politician and communist leader. He is one of the historical personalities in Nepal history who fought for democracy. In 1993 Bhandari died, supposedly in a car accident. The place of accident is made showing Krishna vir along with roads and bridges and a sculpture of Madan Bhandari is kept in which he is pointing a finger implying unity.
