= Hetauda =

Sub-metropolitan City in Bagmati Province, Nepal

Hetauda हेटौंडा
- Sub-Metropolitan City
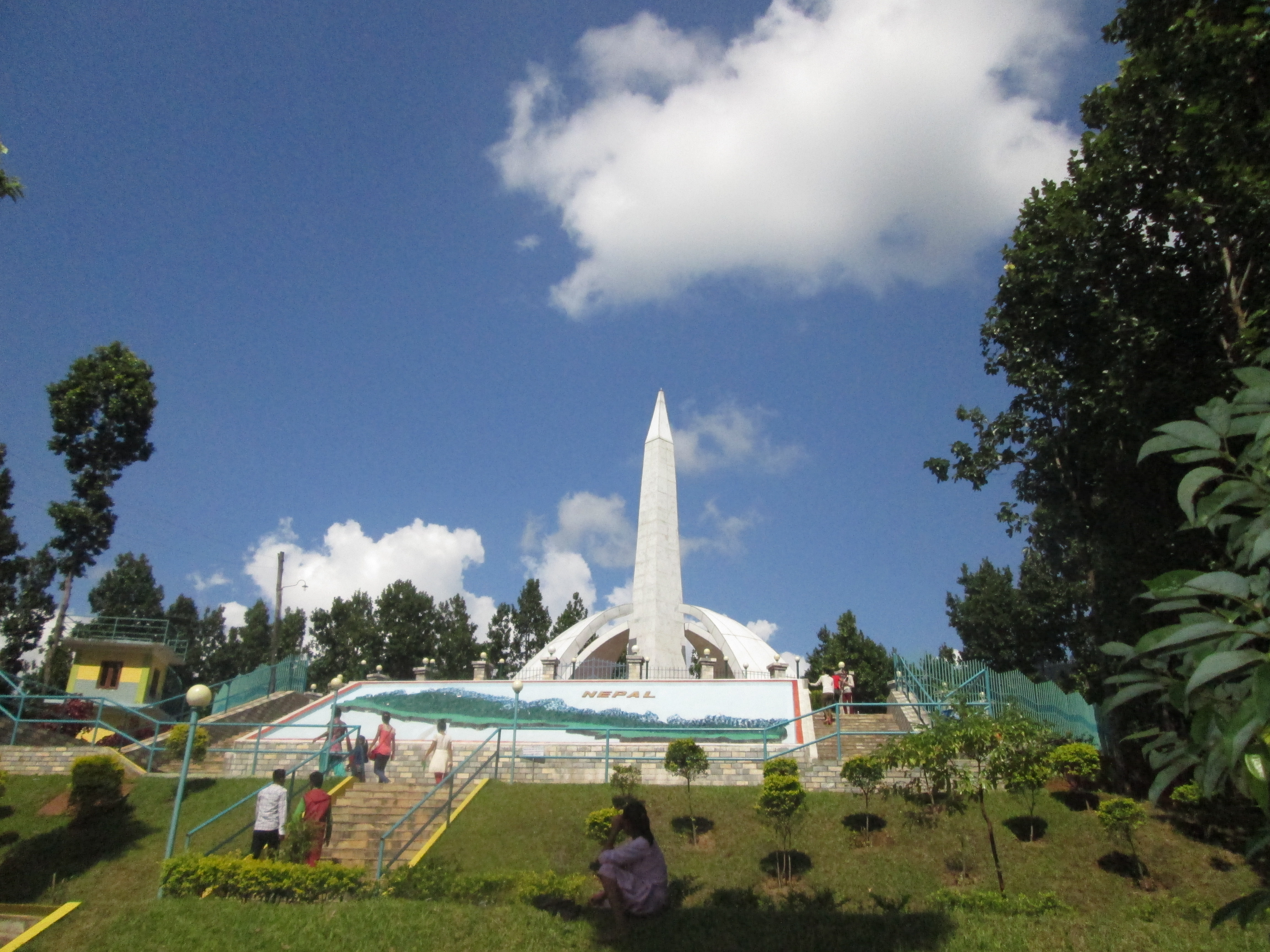
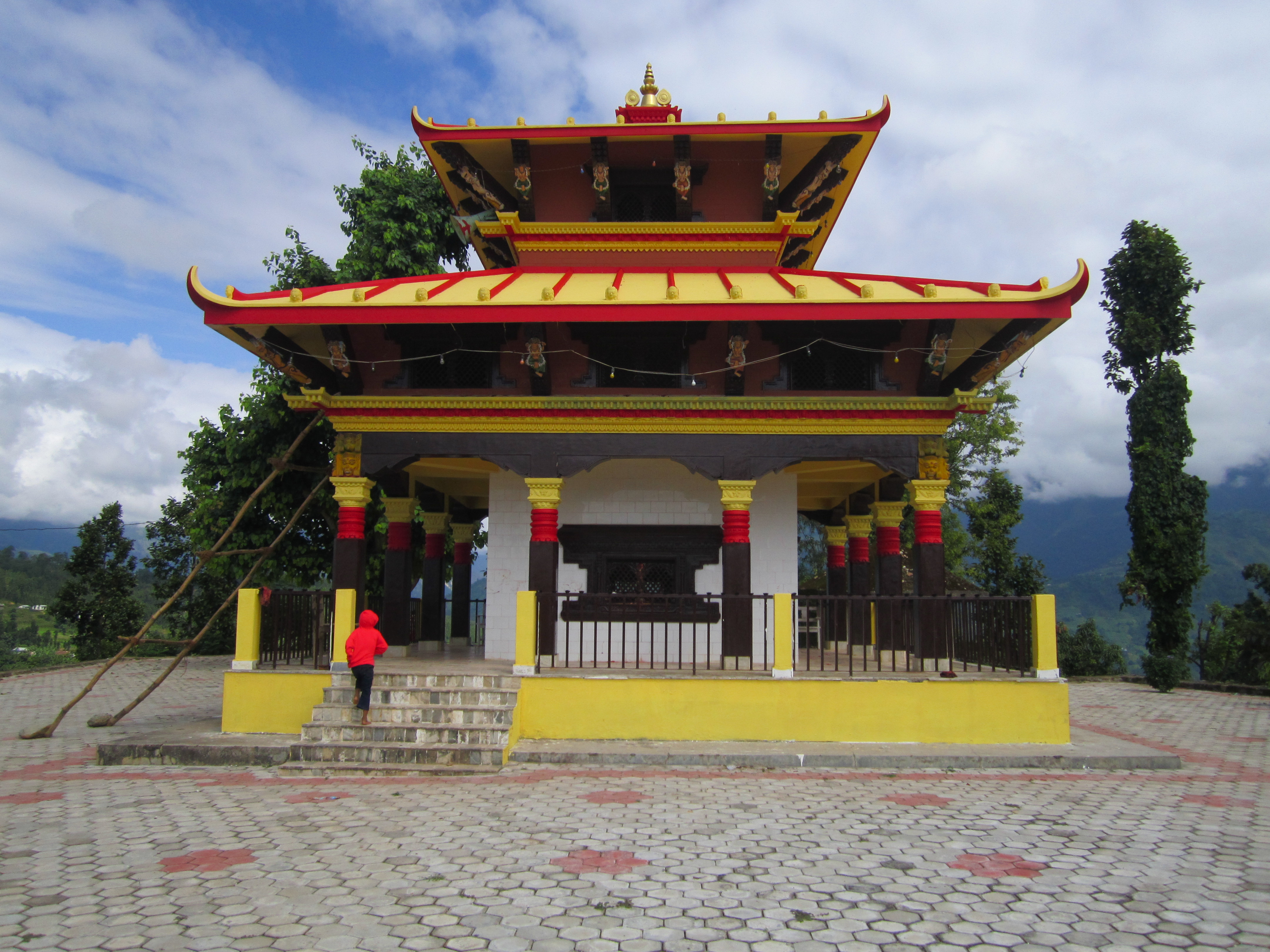
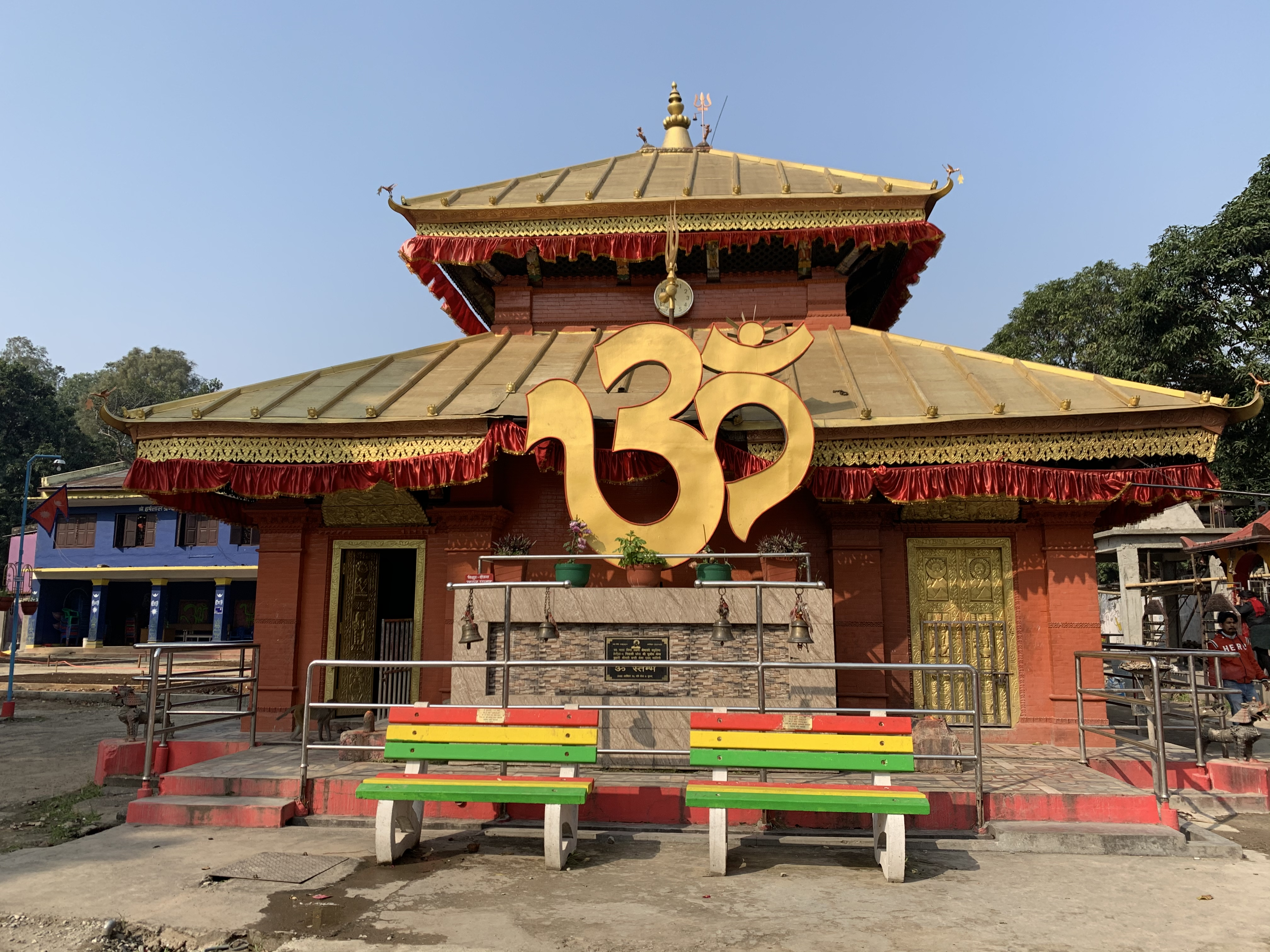
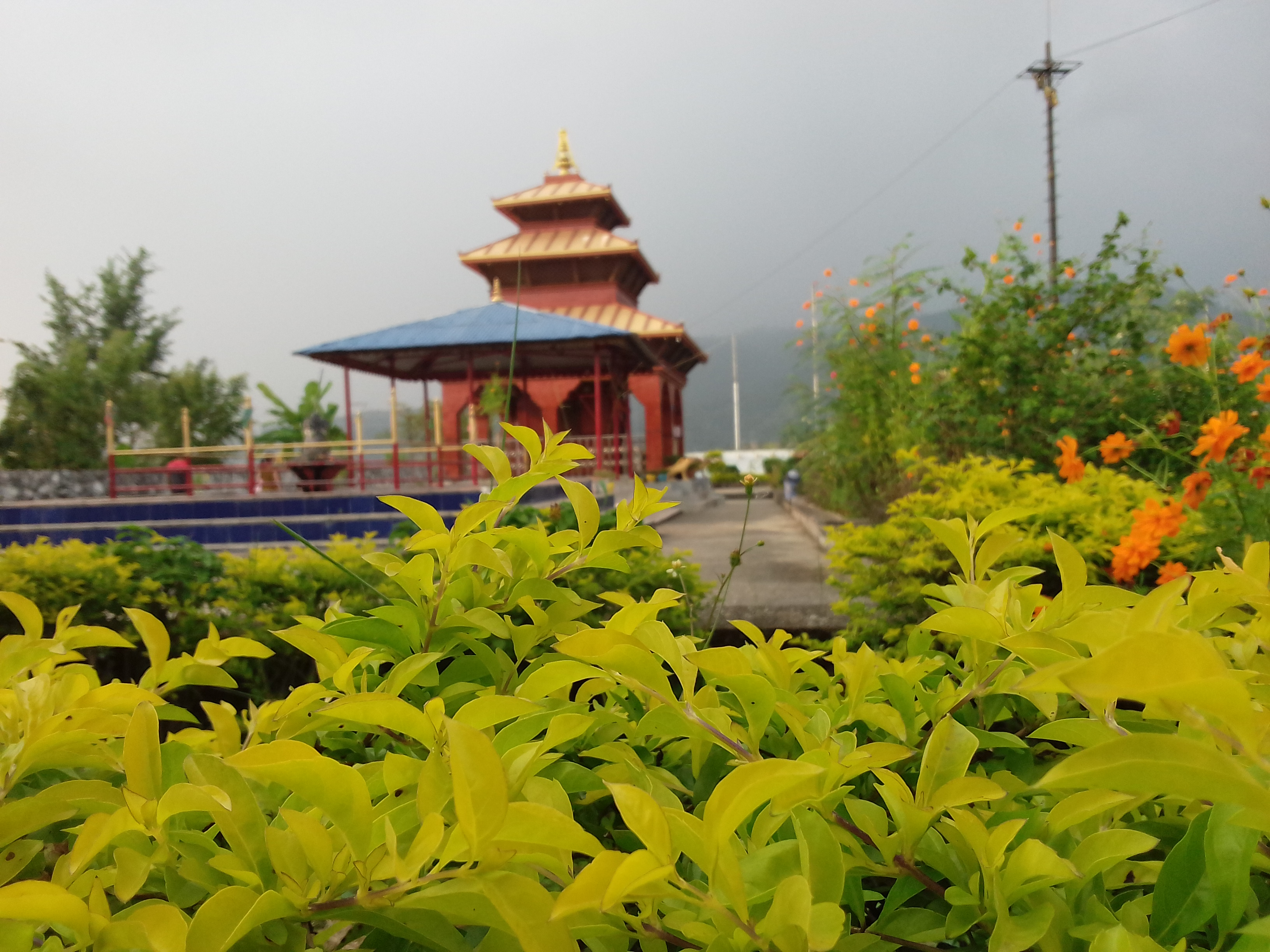
- From Top: Sahid Smarak, Bhutandevi Temple, Manakamana Temple, Kushmanda Sarowar Triveni Dham

- Seal
- Nickname: Green City
- Interactive map of Hetauda
- Location in Nepal Hetauda (Nepal)
- Coordinates: 27°25′49″N 85°01′56″E
- Country: Nepal
- Province: Bagmati
- District: Makwanpur

Government
  - Type: Mayor–council
  - Mayor: Mina Kumari Lama (Unified Socialist)
  - Deputy Mayor: Rajesh Baniya (NC)

Area
  - Total: 261.59 km^{2} (101.00 sq mi)
- Elevation: 345 m (1,132 ft)

Population (2021)
  - Total: 193,576
  - Rank: 10th (Nepal); 4th (Bagmati Province)
  - Density: 740.00/km^{2} (1,916.6/sq mi)
  - Ethnicities: Tamang Newar Magar Bahun Chhetri
- Time zone: UTC+5:45 (NST)
- Post code: 44100, 44107
- Area code: 057
- Website: www.hetaudamun.gov.np

Hetauda (Nepali: हेटौडा, pronounced [heˈʈʌu̯ɽa]) is a sub-metropolitan city in Makwanpur district of Bagmati Province in central Nepal. It is the administrative headquarters of the Makwanpur District and the capital of Bagmati Province as declared by a majority (105 out of 110) of the Provincial Assembly Members on 12 January 2020. Hetauda is one of the largest cities in Nepal. At the 2015 Nepal census, it had a population of 153,875 people. The city's population grew to 193,576 in 2021.

== History ==
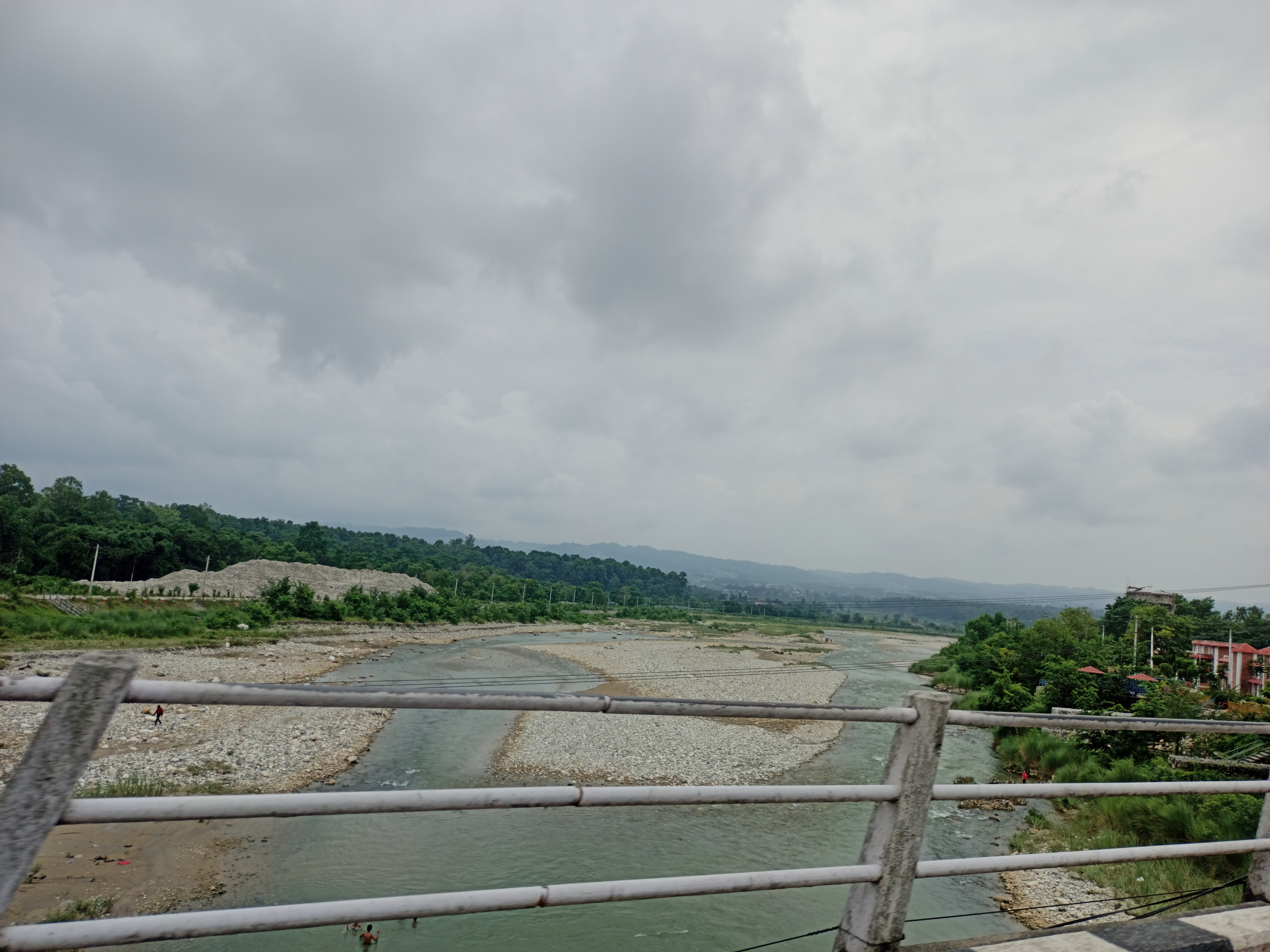
Rapti Khola (River) Hetauda

It is believed that Hetauda got its name from Hidimba, a demonic queen who ended up marrying Bhimsen as per a story in Mahabharat. The fact that there is a place called Bhimphedi just as the plains of Hetauda meets the mountains can be considered a manifestation of this belief. During the Rana regime in Nepal, there was a history of cars being carried by porters to Kathmandu through Bhimphedi.

== Geography ==
Hetauda is a valley surrounded by chure hills in the south and midhills in the north. East Rapti river, Karra river and Kukhreni Khola flow through the city.

== Demographics ==
At the 2021 Nepal census, Hetauda Submetropolitan City had a population of 193,576. Of these, 58.52% spoke Nepali, 28.16% Tamang, 4.8% Newar, 2.2% Bhojpuri, 1.4% Maithili, 1.0% Magar, 0.4% Chepang, 0.3% Gurung, 0.3% Hindi, 0.2% Tharu, 0.2% Urdu, 0.1% Bhujel, 0.1% Lepcha, 0.1% Dewas Rai, 0.1% Rajasthani and 0.2% other languages as their first language.

In terms of ethnicity/caste, 31.9% were Tamang, 25% Hill Brahmin, 13.5% Chhetri, 7.4% Newar, 4.3% Magar, 3.2% Kami, 2.4% Dewas Rai, 1.0% Musalman, 0.9% Damai/Dholi, 0.9% Kathabaniyan, 0.8% Gurung, 0.7% Chepang/Praja, 0.7% Sarki, 0.6% Danuwar, 0.5% Tharu, 0.3% Gharti/Bhujel, 0.3% Sanyasi/Dasnami, 0.3% Thakuri, 0.2% Kalwar, 0.2% Kanu, 0.2% Marwadi, 0.2% Teli, 0.2% other Terai, 0.2% Yadav, 0.1% Terai Brahmin, 0.1% other Dalit, 0.1% Dhanuk, 0.1% Ghale, 0.1% Hajjam/Thakur, 0.1% Kayastha, 0.1% Koiri/Kushwaha, 0.1% Kumal, 0.1% Kurmi, 0.1% Limbu, 0.1% Majhi, 0.1% Rajput, 0.1% Sonar, 0.1% Sudhi, 0.1% Sunuwar and 0.1% others.

In terms of religion, 65.6% were Hindu, 29.4% Buddhist, 3.2% Christian, 1.4% Muslim, 0.1% Kirati, 0.1% Prakriti and 0.1% others.

In terms of literacy, 78.7% could read and write, 2.2% could only read and 19.0% could neither read nor write.

Religion in Hetauda (2021)
Religion	Percent
Hinduism	65.6%
Buddhism	29.4%
Christianity	3.2%
Muslim	1.4%
Others	0.4%

Caste and Ethnic groups in Hetauda
1. Tamang (31.9%)
2. Hill Brahman (25.0%)
3. Chhetri (13.5%)
4. Newar (7.40%)
5. Magar (4.30%)
6. Kami (3.20%)
7. Rai (2.40%)
8. Others (12.3%)
language in Hetauda
1. Nepali (58.5%)
2. Tamang (28.2%)
3. Newari (4.80%)
4. Bhojpuri (2.20%)
5. Others (6.32%)

Broad Caste and Ethnicity category (2011 census)
Broad Ethnic Category	Sub Category	Linguistic Family	Population Percentage
Khas (Hill/Pahari Caste Groups)	Khas Brahmin, Chhetri, Kami, Thakuri, Damai Sarki, Sanyasi/Dasnami	Indo-Aryan	45.3%
Janajati (Hill Tribal Groups)	Magar, Tamang, Gurung, Sherpa, Rai, Limbu etc.	Sino-Tibetan	38.6%
Newar (Kathmandu Valley Caste Groups)	Newari Brahmin, Shrestha, Tamrakar, Newar Buddhist, Maharjan, Rajkarnikar etc.	Indo-Aryan And Sino-Tibetan	8.8%
Madeshi (Terai Caste Groups)	Yadav, Maithil Brahmins, Chamar, Kushwaha, Musahar, Kurmi, Dhanuk etc.	Indo-Aryan	2.9%
Muslim	-	Indo-Aryan	1%
Adibasi (Terai Indigenous Groups)	Tharu, Rajbanshi, etc.	Indo-Aryan And Sino-Tibetan	0.8%
Others	-	Indo-Aryan	2.6%

== Economy ==
The Hetauda Industrial District (HID) is one of the biggest industrial districts in Nepal, housing large, medium-scale, and cottage industry. It was established in 1963 under technical and financial assistance of the government of the United States of America.

== Attractions ==
One of the most popular attractions of Hetauda is Martyr Memorial Park, or Sahid Smarak (Nepali: शहीद स्मारक), which was completed in 1994. The park honors Nepalese martyrs, from those who died in the British colonial wars to those who overthrew the autocratic Panchayat system in 1989. A series of sculptures of these martyrs sit on a large boulder; their faces were sculpted by student volunteers from Lalit Kala Campus. The park is also popular as a picnic spot and as an escape from the busy city life. It has a swimming pool and a zoo that houses some endangered and some common wild animals, from monkeys to leopards.

There are other attractions in Hetauda such as Makwanpur Gadhi, Gumba Danda, Bhutandevi Mandir, Hatiya Jurethum Tourism Park, Banaskhandi Devi Mandir, Pathivara temple, Salak park, trikandi temple and picnic spot, Churia Mai Temple, Puspalal Smriti Peace Park, Kushmanda Sarowar Triveni Dham.

== Media ==
There are many radio, print, TV, online media in Hetauda. Popular FM radio are Hetauda 96.6 MHz and Radio Thaha Sanchar FM 99.6 MHz. News media like Hetauda Sandesh Dainik, Hetauda Khabar, Hetauda Today & Anirudrakhabar are active. The television network in hetauda was Team TV hd and has now National Gold HD.

== Transportation ==
East-West Mahendra Highway and Madan Bhandari Highway connect Hetauda to other areas. Ongoing project Kathmandu - Kulekhani - Hetauda Tunnel (KKHT) Highway connects Hetauda to Kathmandu via Kulekhani. Kathmandu Terai Fast Track, KTFT, is under construction which will shorten the travel duration between Hetauda and Kathmandu. Kanti Highway connects Lalitpur Metropolitan City to Hetauda Sub-Metropolitan City.

== Climate ==
Climate data for Hetauda, elevation 452 m (1,483 ft), (1991–2020 normals)
Month	Jan	Feb	Mar	Apr	May	Jun	Jul	Aug	Sep	Oct	Nov	Dec	Year
Mean daily maximum °C (°F)	22.2 (72.0)	25.2 (77.4)	30.3 (86.5)	34.9 (94.8)	34.1 (93.4)	33.4 (92.1)	32.2 (90.0)	32.5 (90.5)	31.8 (89.2)	30.3 (86.5)	27.0 (80.6)	23.8 (74.8)	29.8 (85.7)
Daily mean °C (°F)	14.8 (58.6)	17.4 (63.3)	21.9 (71.4)	26.3 (79.3)	27.6 (81.7)	28.4 (83.1)	28.0 (82.4)	28.1 (82.6)	27.2 (81.0)	24.3 (75.7)	19.9 (67.8)	16.8 (62.2)	23.4 (74.1)
Mean daily minimum °C (°F)	7.3 (45.1)	9.6 (49.3)	13.4 (56.1)	17.7 (63.9)	21.1 (70.0)	23.3 (73.9)	23.8 (74.8)	23.7 (74.7)	22.6 (72.7)	18.3 (64.9)	12.7 (54.9)	9.7 (49.5)	16.9 (62.5)
Average precipitation mm (inches)	19.0 (0.75)	20.9 (0.82)	23.5 (0.93)	69.1 (2.72)	196.7 (7.74)	365.0 (14.37)	683.9 (26.93)	563.4 (22.18)	355.2 (13.98)	78.1 (3.07)	2.2 (0.09)	7.7 (0.30)	2,384.7 (93.88)
Source: Department of Hydrology and Meteorology

== Gauritar International Cricket Stadium ==
The Gauritar International Cricket Stadium is an emerging cricket venue located in Hetauda. Currently under construction as of early 2025, the stadium is projected to have a seating capacity of 6,000 spectators upon completion.

The project is estimated to cost NPR 11.74 million, with the construction contract awarded to SNS PL HKC JV for NPR 94.282 million. As of early 2025, ground leveling work is in progress, with plans to install an underground drainage system and lay Bermuda grass on the field.

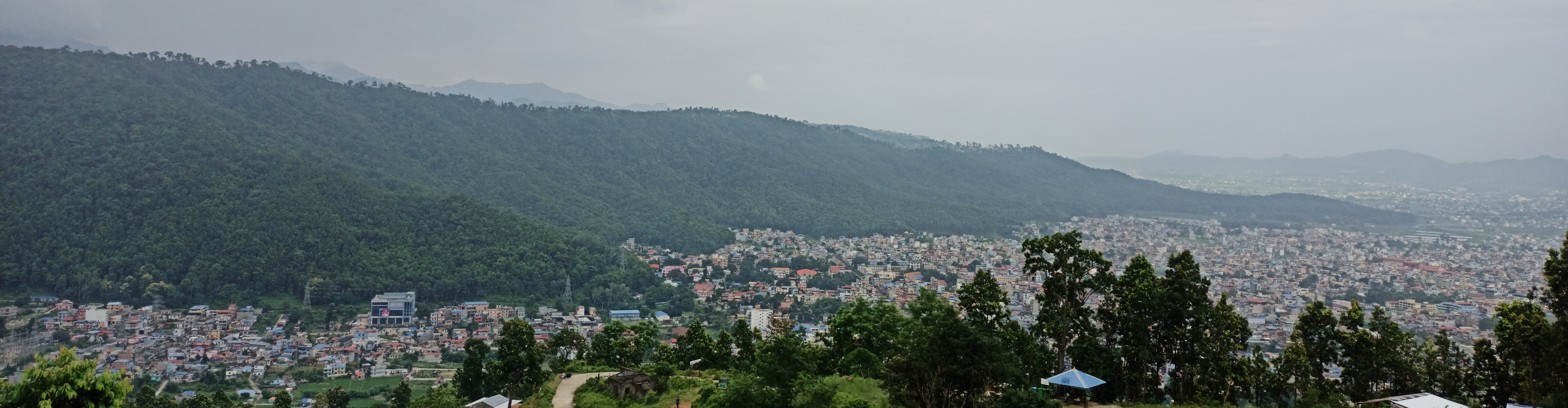
Aerial View of Hetauda City

== See also ==
- Nijgadh
- Kathmandu
- Pokhara
- Butwal
- Biratnagar
- Birgunj
