= Bishnupaduka (shrine) =

Hindu pilgrimage site in Nepal

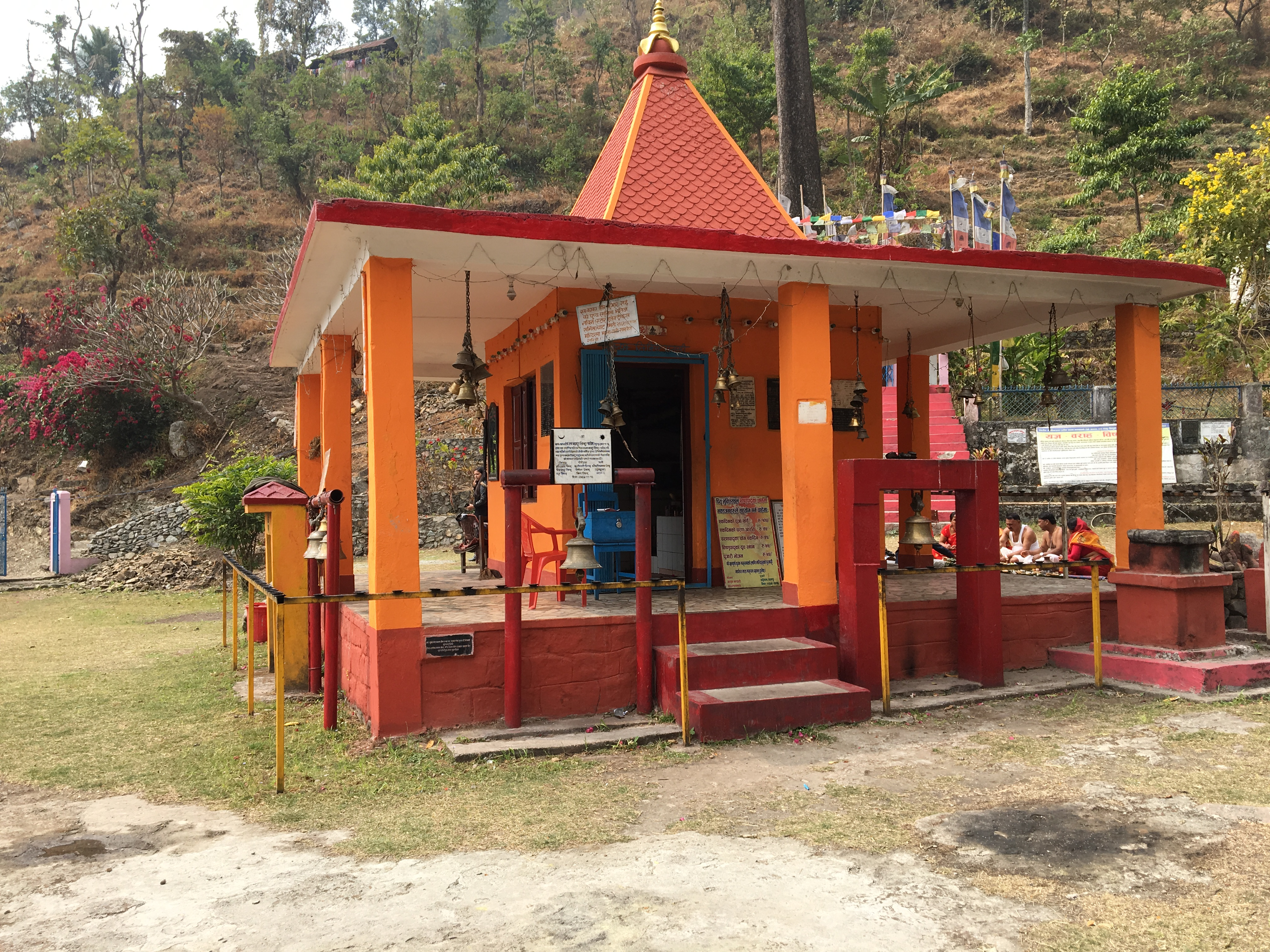
- Main temple of shrine

- Location within Nepal

Religion
- Affiliation: Hinduism
- Deity: Vishnu
- Festival: Kuse Ausnsi

Location
- Location: Dharan, Sunsari
- State: Province No. 1
- Country: Nepal
- Coordinates: 26°49′24.73″N 87°14′52.53″E

Architecture
- Type: Shikhara

Bishnupaduka (also Vishnupaduka, lit. 'Bishnu's feet') is a pilgrimage site in the northwest part of Dharan in Nepal.
