= Harka Sampang =

Nepali politician and social activist (born 1983)

- हर्क साम्पाङ
- Harka Sampang in 2026

Member of Parliament, House of Representatives
- Incumbent
- Assumed office 26 March 2026
- Preceded by: Ashok Rai
- Constituency: Sunsari 1

1st Chairman of the Shram Sanskriti Party
- Incumbent
- Assumed office 2 November 2025
- Preceded by: Position established

6th Mayor of Dharan
- In office 23 May 2022 – 19 January 2026
- Deputy: Aindra Bikram Begha
- Preceded by: Tilak Rai
- Succeeded by: Aindra Bikram Begha (acting)

Personal details
- Born: 27 February 1983 (age 43) Khartamchha, Khotang District, Nepal
- Party: Shram Sanskriti
- Children: 2
- Parents: Til Sampang Rai (father); Jasamaya Sampang Rai (mother)
- Education: Passed only Secondary Lvl examination,Grade-IX
- Known for: Starting Shramdaan movement in Nepal

Harka Raj Sampang Rai (Note: Nepali: हर्कराज साम्पाङ राई) (born 27 February 1983) is a Nepalese politician and social activist who is the founder and leader of the Shram Sanskriti Party (SSP). He has served as Member of Parliament from Sunsari 1 since 2026.

Born in Khartamchha, Sampang studied from Mahendra Multiple Campus and worked as a tutor before going to Iraq and Afghanistan for employment. After returning to Nepal, he started social activism and promoted the Shramdaan movement in the country. After winning the 2022 Dharan municipal election, Sampang served as the 6th mayor of Dharan, being the first independent candidate to have been elected as mayor of Dharan. He is also famous for make in Nepal enisetives.

After the 2025 Gen Z protests in Nepal, he founded the Shram Sanskriti Party and won his seat from Sunsari 1 in the 2026 general election. The SSP became the fifth-largest party in the Nepali parliament.

== Early life and education ==
He was born in Nepal's Khartamchha in Khotang District. He moved to Dharan in 1998 after completing his SLC to pursue higher education. He graduated from Mahendra Multiple Campus in Dharan. After completing his higher education, he went to Iraq and Afghanistan for employment.

== Political career ==
Sampang contested the 2017 by-elections for the mayor of Dharan as an independent but only managed to get 422 votes. He again contested for the post of mayor at the 2022 elections still as an independent and was elected after getting a vote share of 39.8%. He was the first independent candidate elected as mayor of Dharan.

In the 2026 general elections, he ran under the new Shram Sanskriti Party which he founded, from the Sunsari-1 constituency, defeating major party candidates and winning a seat in the House of Representatives with 35,741 votes.

== Activism ==
After six years working abroad he returned to Dharan and opened the National Unity Network to protest against corruption. He was also involved in protests against tax raises, illegal sand extraction from rivers and the water scarcity in Dharan. In 2016, Rai became the coordinator of people displaced by the expansion of the Madan Bhandari Inner Terai Highway. He built Shram Sanskriti Park to showcase the history of Dharan.

In 2025, Sampang founded the Shram Sanskriti Party. His party is currently fifth largest in the Nepali parliament. He is part of the opposition to the government of Prime Minister Balen Shah.

== Electoral history ==
=== 2022 Dharan municipal election ===
Mayoral elections result
Party	Candidate	Votes	%	±%
Independent	Harka Raj Rai Sampang	20,821	39.8%	+39.0%
Congress	Kishore Rai	16,051	30.7%	−19.0%
CPN (UML)	Manju Bhandari Subedi	12,825	24.5%	−20%
RPP	Naresh Kumar Shakya	1,488	2.8%	+2.5%
Others		1,142	2.2%	
Total votes		52,335	100.0%	
Rejected ballots		10,562		
Turnout		62,897		
Registered electors		100,324		
Independent gain from Congress		Swing	+29.0%	

== See also ==
- Shram Sanskriti Party
