= Sirjana Shrestha =

Nepalese Politician

The Honourable Sirjana Shrestha
- सिर्जना श्रेष्ठ

Member of Parliament, Pratinidhi Sabha
- Incumbent
- Assumed office 27 March 2026
- Constituency: PR

Personal details
- Born: 1981 (age 44–45) Dharan, Sunsari, Nepal
- Citizenship: Nepali
- Party: Rastriya Swatantra Party
- Profession: Politician; Entrepreneur

Sirjana Shrestha (Nepali: सिर्जना श्रेष्ठ) is a Nepalese politician and entrepreneur. She is currently serving as a member of parliament from the Rastriya Swatantra Party. She is a member of 7th Pratinidhi Sabha elected through Proportional Representation under the Janajati female cluster in the 2026 general election. She was vice president of the Federation of Computer Association Nepal and managing director of Phoenix Trading, Nepal, and chief executive officer of Cloud Link Security, Nepal.

== Early life and education ==
Shrestha was born in Dharan, Sunsari, Nepal in 1981. She belongs to the Newar ethnic group of Nepal. She has completed a Master's degree and is associated with the computer and information technology business sector.

== Politics ==
She has been a member of the Rastriya Swatantra Party since 2025. She was nominated as a proportional representative member of parliament from the Rastriya Swatantra Party in the 2026 Nepalese general election. She is now a member of the Industry, Commerce, Labour and Consumer Welfare Committee of Pratinidhi Sabha.
