= Dharan Clock Tower =

Clock tower in Dharan, Nepal

- Clock Tower
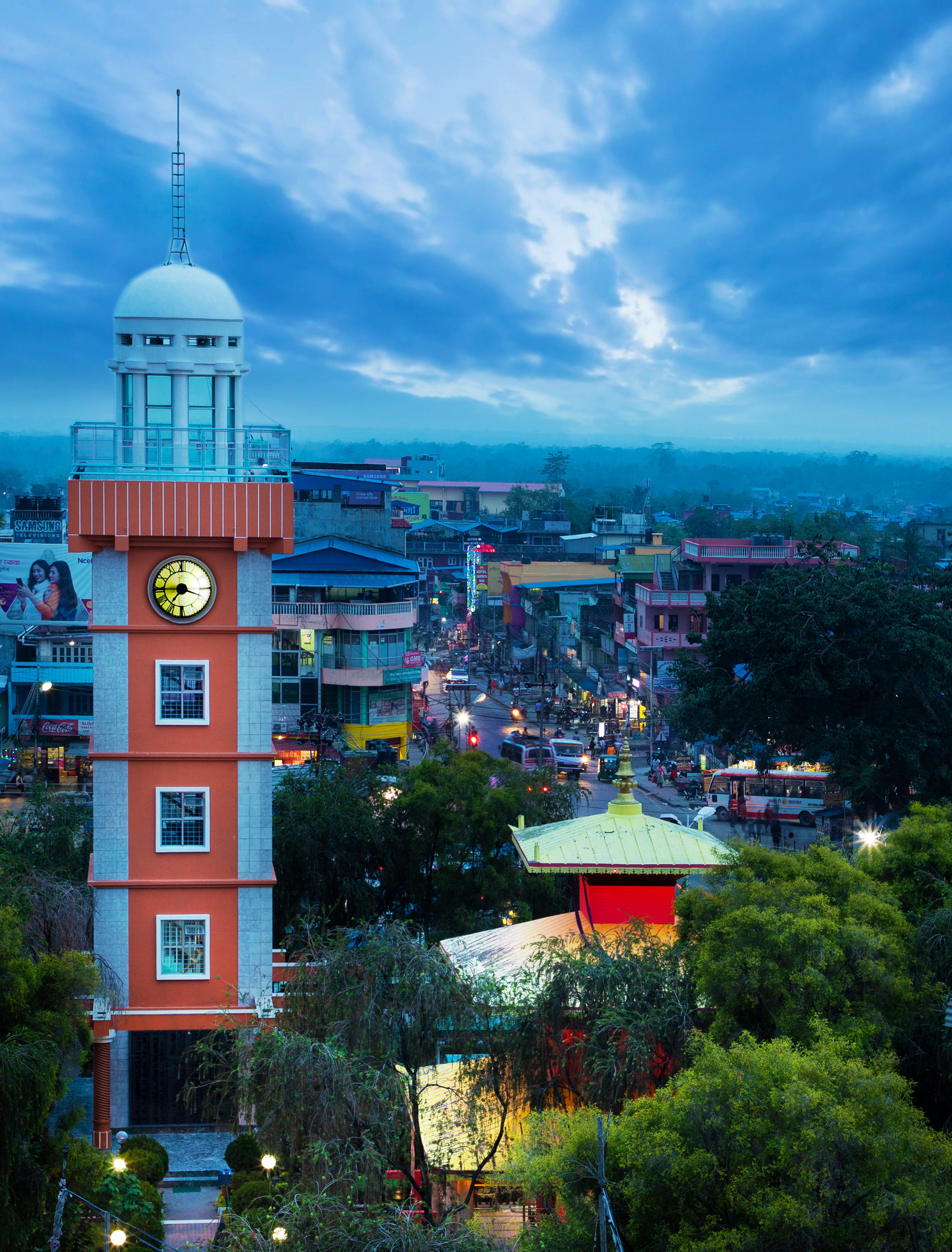
- Interactive map of Dharan Clock Tower
- Location: Dharan, Nepal
- Coordinates: 26°48′41″N 87°17′7″E
- Height: 76.5 feet (23.3 m)
- Opening date: 1991
- Dedicated to: Earthquake victims

Dharan Clock Tower (also known as Ghantaghar or घन्टाघर ) is located in Bhanu Chowk, Dharan, Nepal.

The tower was constructed under the twenty-year plan of the city at a cost of NPR 5,639,000. The financial support was collected through the Dharan Hong Kong Manch, a forum of Nepalese immigrants (most of the contributors from Dharan) from Hong Kong and Macao. The Amrit Nirman Sewa (Pvt.) Ltd., a local construction company, built the tower. The tower was opened to public on 2062 BS (2005–2006).

The tower is designed after the Clock Tower in Hong Kong. It is 76.5 feet tall and has five stories. On the top is an observation platform, from which about 50 people can view the city at the same time. A memorial has also been constructed in the periphery of the tower, in memory of the victims of the 1988 Nepal earthquake (2045 BS (1988–1989)).

Earthquake Memorial near the tower
