= List of educational institutions in Dharan =

Dharan is a major educational hub in eastern Nepal. The city hosts several prominent national institutions—such as the B.P. Koirala Institute of Health Sciences (BPKIHS), the Central Campus of Technology (Hattisar), the Purwanchal Campus (IOE), and Mahendra Multiple Campus—alongside well-known local institutions like Bishnu Memorial Secondary School and numerous other colleges and high schools.

== Universities ==
- B.P. Koirala Institute of Health Sciences

== Colleges ==
- Mahendra Multiple Campus
- Central Campus of Technology (Hattisar) Dharan-14
- UN College Dharan-16
- Purwanchal Campus - Tribhuvan University
- Dharan College of Management - affiliated to the Purbanchal University
- Birendra Memorial College - affiliated to the Tribhuvan University
- Dharan Multiple Campus, Dharan-16, affiliated to the Tribhuvan University
- Alpine College, Dharan-10
- Dharan Model College, Dharan-4
- Dharan City College, Dharan-12
- National Multiple College, Dharan-4
- Kaushiki Campus, Dharan-16
- Sagarmatha College
- Dharan Adarsha College
- Pindeshwor Vidyapeeth - affiliated to the Nepal Sanskrit University
- Sunsari Technical College, Dharan-4
- Dharan Mega College, Dharan-12

== High schools ==
- Shree Public Higher Secondary School, Dharan-12
- Bishnu Memorial Higher Secondary School, Dharan-9
- Aims Academy, Chatara Line, Dharan-12
- Araniko Memorial Boarding School, Kabir Tol, Dharan-8
- Bhagawati Middle School (Preliminary School) Dharan 16 (Estd 1954)
- Bhaludhunga Higher Secondary School, Dharan-20
- Bhanusmriti Secondary School, Dharan-3
- Carmel High School, Buddha Road, Dharan-18
- Chandra Sanskrit Secondary School
- Children's Academy English Boarding School (Pindeshowr Chowk), Dharan-15
- Delhi Public School, Dharan-18
- Depot Higher Secondary School, Dharan 18
- Dharan Adarsha Boarding Higher Secondary School, Dharan-4
- Dharan Higher Secondary School (Dhss), Dharan-4
- Eureka Higher Secondary School, Laxmi Sadak, Dharan-4
- Gem Secondary Boarding School, Dharan 18
- Gyanodaya Secondary Boarding School, Pindeswari Chowk, Dharan-15
- Gyanodaya Secondary High School, Dharan-11
- Hibiscus Boarding School, Dharan
- Holy Land International School, Dharan-15
- Junior Pioneers, Dharan
- K.K. International School, Dharan-15
- Koshi Secondary English Boarding School, Dharan-8
- National Academy Of Applied Science And Technology (Naast College), Dharan-16
- Navjyoti Catholic English School (Recently Upgraded To College), Dharan-15
- Oasis English High School, Dharan-11
- Panchayat Higher Secondary School, Dharan 10
- Panchayat Elementary School, Dharan 16
- Parvat Secondary Boarding School, Dharan-19
- Pravat Higher Secondary School, Chatara Line, Dharan-12
- Prithvi Cambridge English School, Dharan-19
- Sainik Awasiya Mahavidyalaya (Samd), Dharan-13
- Saraswati English Boarding School, Dharan-8
- Shree Laboratory Higher Secondary School, Dharan-8
- Shree Panchakanya Secondary School, Dharan-17
- Shree Public Higher Secondary School (Phushre), Dharan-13
- Shree Sarada Balika Higher Secondary School, Dharan-16
- Shree Saraswati Higher Secondary School, Dharan-6
- Shree Shiksha Sadan Higher Secondary School, Sadan Road, Dharan-15
- Shree Shikshya Niketan Higher Secondary School, Dharan-2
- Sion School, Jorshakuwa, Dharan- 16
- Small Heaven English Boarding School, Dharan-13
- St. Joseph English Boarding School, Dharan 17, Bichghopa
- Summit Higher Secondary Boarding School, Bagaicha Line, Dharan-9
- Sunakhari Academy, Chatraline Dharan-12
- United Gurkha Academy, Tulsipath, Dharan-15
- Victory Residential Secondary School, Dharan-11
- Vijayapur Higher Secondary School, Dharan 14
