= Radio Dharan =

- Dharan, Sunsari; Nepal
- Broadcast area: Sunsari, Morang, Dhankuta, Udayapur
- Frequency: 88.8 MHz

Programming
- Language: Nepali,
- Format: News/Talk/Music

Ownership
- Owner: Sakar Media Pvt. Ltd.

Technical information
- Power: 100W

Links
- Website: www.radiodharan.com.np

Radio Dharan 88.8mhz is a radio station in Nepal, based in Dharan, Sunsari District.
