= Bhanu Chowk =

Landmark in Dharan, Sunsari, Koshi Province, Nepal

Bhanu Chowk भानु चोक
- neighbourhood
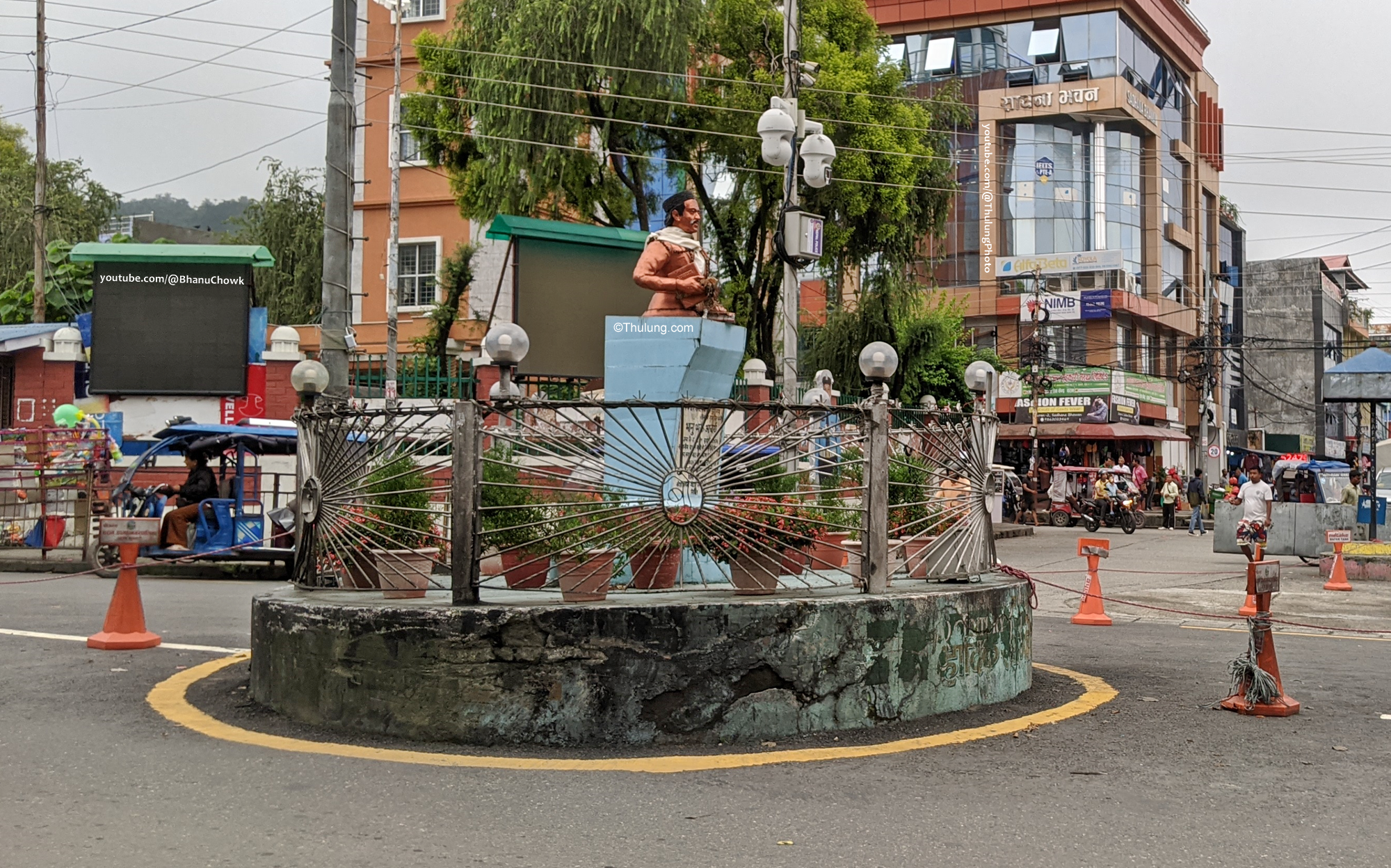
- Bhanu Chowk, Dharan, Eastern Nepal
- Interactive map of Bhanu Chowk
- Coordinates: 26.811125°N 87.285046°E
- Country: Nepal
- Province: Province No. 1
- District: Sunsari
- Area: Dharan
- Time zone: UTC+5:45 (Nepal Time)

Bhanu Chowk is a local landmark in Dharan, Sunsari of Eastern Nepal. Bhanu Chowk is regarded as the centre and one of the most iconic and busiest landmarks of Dharan. The Dharan Clock Tower is also located near Bhanu Chowk.

Bhanu Chowk is also the major transportation hub of Dharan. The local bus stand(s) present nearby depart several hundreds of buses, vans and such that are headed to several different parts of Nepal including Kathmandu and Pokhara, on a daily basis. Several Citi Safaris and Tempos are a source of local transport available from Bhanu Chowk to various parts of the city.
