= Mayor of Hetauda =

Executive head of Hetauda Sub-Metropolitan City

- हेटौडा उपमहानगरपालिका नगर प्रमुख
- Incumbent; Mina Kumari Lama since 23 May 2022
- Type: Executive Head
- Seat: Office of Municipal Executive, Hetauda
- Appointer: Electorate of Hetauda
- Term length: Five years, renewable once
- Constituting instrument: Constitution of Nepal
- Inaugural holder: Basudev Rizal
- Formation: 1969
- Deputy: Deputy Mayor of Hetauda Sub-Metropolitan City
- Salary: रु. 40,200
- Website: www.hetaudamun.gov.np

The Mayor of Hetauda is the head of the municipal executive of Hetauda. The role was created in 1969.

The mayor as of 2022 is Mina Kumari Lama. The position has been held by five people.

The city is governed by the Hetauda Sub-Metropolitan City Council and the mayor is supported by the municipal executive which consists of the deputy mayor and ward chairs of Hetauda's 19 wards.

== Responsibilities ==
The mayor is elected for a five-year term that is renewable only once. The municipal executive is formed under the chairmanship of the mayor. The local government in Nepal has authority over the local units pursuant to Schedule 8 of the Constitution of Nepal. The mayor derives its power from the Local Government Operation Act, 2017.

The mayor's powers are:

- Summon and chair meetings of the municipal assembly and the municipal executive
- Table agendas and proposals to the assembly and executive
- Prepare and present the annual programmes and budget
- Enforce the decisions of the assembly and executive
- Oversee the work of committees and sub-committees of the municipality and ward committees.

The mayor of Hetauda s also a member of the Makwanpur District Assembly.

== Election ==
The mayor is elected though first-past-the-post voting. In order to qualify as a candidate for mayor, the person must be a citizen of Nepal, must be over twenty-one, must be registered in the electoral roll of Hetauda Sub-Metropolitan City and not be disqualified by law.

== List of mayors ==
=== Panchayat era (1960–1990) ===
#	Pradhan Pancha	Term of office		Deputy
1	Basudev Rijal	1969	1973	
2	Omnath Parajuli	1973	1975	Hari Bahadur Mahat
3	Ram Bahadur Khadka			
4	Nir Shankar Shrestha			

=== Constitutional monarchy (1990-2008) ===
#	Mayor	Term of office		Deputy
5	Dormani Poudel	1992	2005	Hari Bahadur Mahat
6	Madhukar Prasad Adhikari			

=== Federal Democratic Republic of Nepal (2017-present) ===
#	Mayor	Term of office		Political party	Deputy
4	Hari Bahadur Mahat	May 24, 2017	May 19, 2022	CPN(UML)	Mina Kumari Lama
5	Mina Kumari Lama	May 23, 2022	Present	CPN (US)	Rajesh Baniya

== See also ==
- Mayor of Kathmandu
- Mayor of Pokhara
- Mayor of Dharan
