= Pindeshwor Temple =

Hindu temple in Nepal

- पिण्डेश्वर मन्दिर
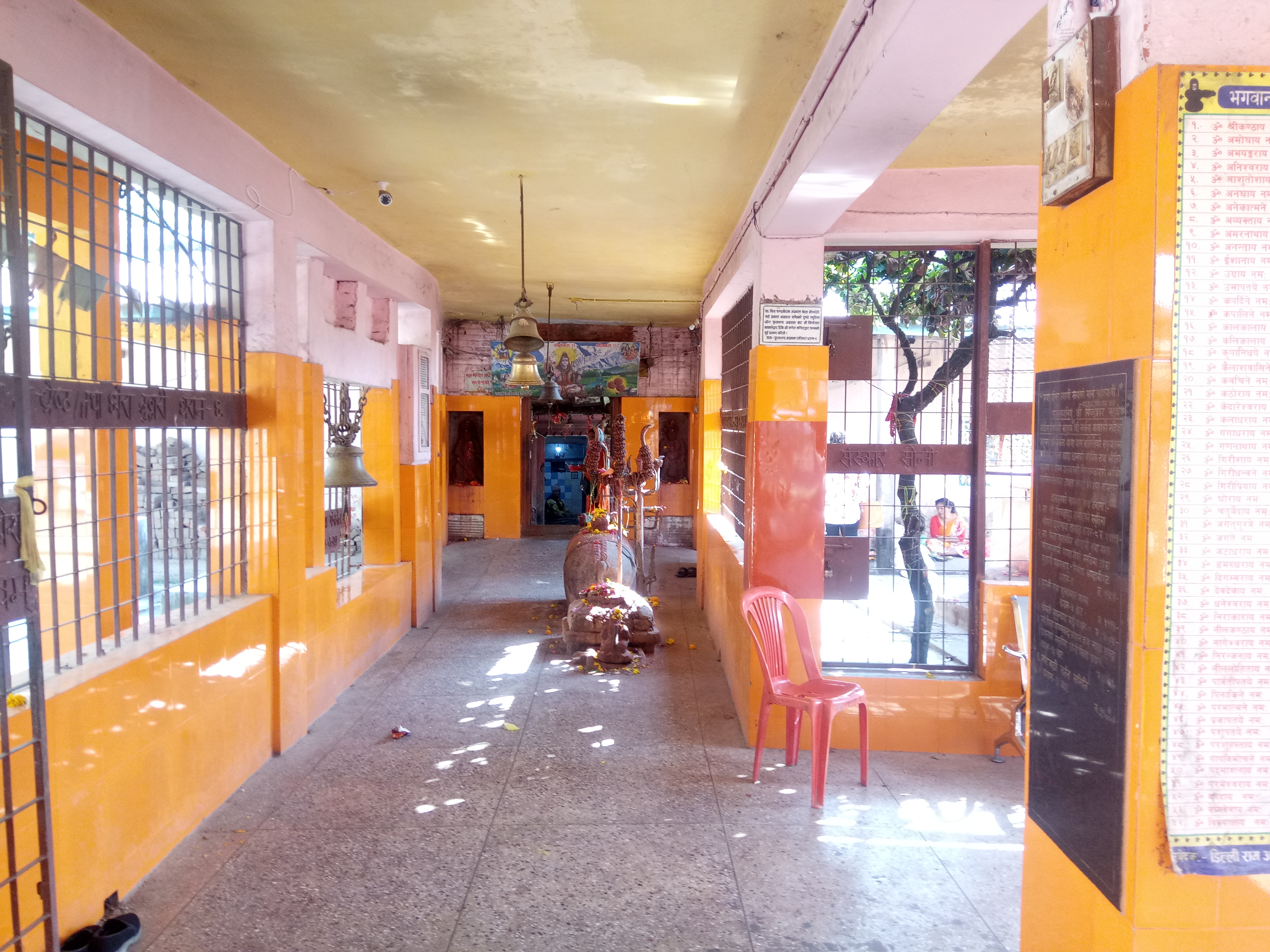
- Entrance of Pindeshwor Temple.

- Location within Nepal

Religion
- Affiliation: Hinduism
- Deity: Shiva
- Festivals: Every Monday of Shraavana month, Balachaturdasi and Maha Shivaratri

Location
- Location: Dharan, sunsari
- State: Koshi
- Country: Nepal
- Interactive map of Pindeshwor Temple
- Coordinates: 26.8133°N 87.2946°E

Architecture
- Type: Dome

Pindeshwor Temple (Nepali: पिण्डेश्वर मन्दिर) is situated in Dharan Sub-Municipality in Sunsari District of east Nepal. On every Monday in the month of Shraavana, a large number of devotees from different places come bare foot to pay homage to Lord Shiva with holy water from Koshi River. It is believed that a devotee's wishes will come true if they offer water from Saptakoshi and Koka River in the Barahachetra temple and water from Kaushiki Tat in the Pindeshwor Shivalaya. In the Pindeshwor Temple the oil lamps are kept burning incessantly.
