= Mayor of Dharan =

Executive head of Dharan Sub-Metropolitan City

- धरान उपमहानगरपालिका नगर प्रमुख
- Incumbent; Aindra Begha Limbu(Acting)
- Style: No courtesy or style ascribed
- Type: Executive Head
- Residence: Private residence
- Seat: Office of Municipal Executive, Dharan
- Appointer: Electorate of Dharan
- Term length: Five years, renewable once
- Constituting instrument: Constitution of Nepal
- Inaugural holder: Kedarnath Khanal
- Formation: 1958; 68 years ago
- Deputy: Deputy Mayor of Dharan Sub-Metropolitan City
- Salary: रु. 40,200
- Website: www.dharan.gov.np

The Mayor of Dharan is the head of the municipal executive of Dharan. The role was created in 1958.

The mayor as of 2022 is Yogesh Buba . The position has been held by six people.

The city is governed by the Dharan Sub-Metropolitan City Council and the mayor is supported by the municipal executive which consists of the deputy mayor and ward chairs of Dharan's 20 wards.

== Responsibilities ==
The mayor is elected for a five-year term that is renewable only once. The municipal executive is formed under the chairmanship of the mayor. The local government in Nepal has authority over the local units pursuant to Schedule 8 of the Constitution of Nepal. The mayor derives its power from the Local Government Operation Act, 2017.

The mayor's powers are:

- Summon and chair meetings of the municipal assembly and the municipal executive
- Table agendas and proposals to the assembly and executive
- Prepare and present the annual programmes and budget
- Enforce the decisions of the assembly and executive
- Oversee the work of committees and sub-committees of the municipality and ward committees.

The mayor of Dharan is also a member of the Sunsari District Assembly.

== Election ==
The mayor is elected though first-past-the-post voting. In order to qualify as a candidate for mayor, the person must be a citizen of Nepal, must be over twenty-one, must be registered in the electoral roll of Dharan Sub-Metropolitan City and not be disqualified by law.

== List of mayors ==
=== Panchayat era (1960–1990) ===
#	Pradhan Pancha	Term of office	
1	Kedarnath Khanal	1960	1962
2	Govinda Raj Moktan	1968	1974

=== Constitutional monarchy (1990-2008) ===
#	Mayor	Term of office	
2	Dhyan Bahadur Rai	1992	1997
3	Manoj Menyangbo	1997	2007

=== Federal Democratic Republic of Nepal (2017-present) ===
#	Mayor	Term of office		Political party
4	Tara Subba Limbu	2017	2018	CPN(UML)
-	Manju Bhandari	2018	2019	
5	Tilak Rai	2019	2022	Nepali Congress
6	Harka Raj Rai	2022	present	Independent

== See also ==
- Dharan
- 2022 Dharan municipal election
- Mayor of Kathmandu
- List of mayors of Pokhara
- Mayor of Hetauda
