= Shramdaan =

Indian practice of labor for the community

Shramdaan (Devanagari: श्रमदान) meaning of (Shram meaning "labour" and Daan meaning "donation") refers to the voluntary contribution of physical labor for the welfare of the community. It is a practice deeply rooted in South Asian tradition, emphasizing selfless service and the dignity of labor as a means to foster social development and harmony

== History ==
The concept of Shramdaan has been prevalent in India for generations and is closely associated with Mahatma Gandhi, who advocated for the dignity of labor and equal social status for all. Gandhi emphasized that true cleanliness and social order are achieved through collective, voluntary efforts. Shramdaan also promotes religious harmony, equality, and acceptance of diversity within society
