= Budha Subba Temple =

Religious shrine in Nepal

- बुढा सुब्बा
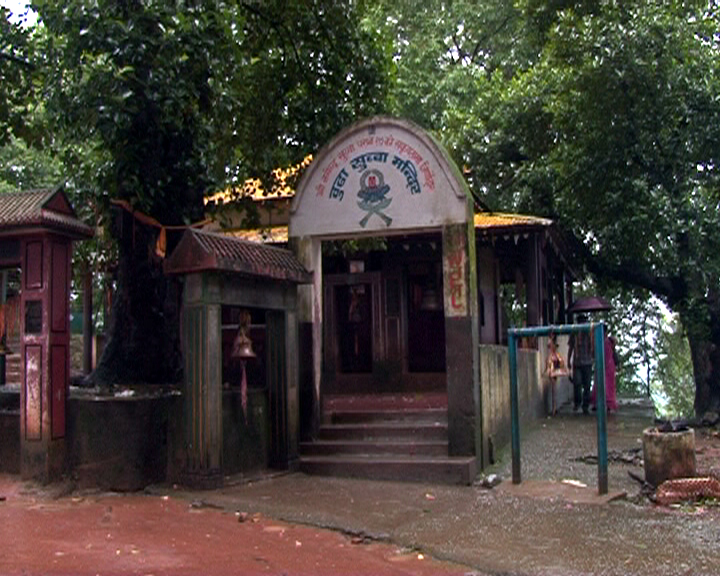
- Budha Subba Temple (Manghim)

- Location in Nepal

Religion
- Affiliation: Hinduism
- District: Sunsari District

Location
- Location: Dharan - 14
- Country: Nepal
- Interactive map of Budha Subba Temple
- Coordinates: 26.820°N 87.30°E

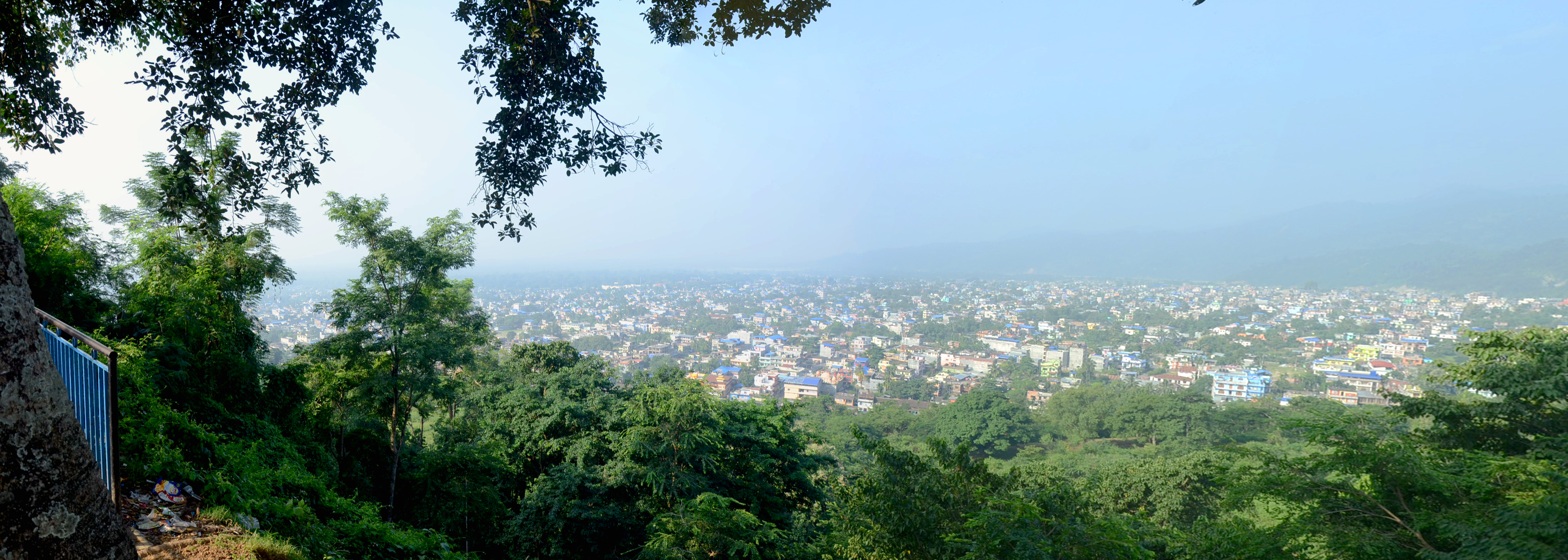
Dharan city view from Budha Subba height

Budha Subba Temple is a religious temple of the Nepali people located in Bijayapur of Dharan, Nepal. It is believed to fulfill the wishes and bring good luck to the people visiting there. According to Kirat historian Iman Singh Chemjong (ᤀᤡᤔᤠᤏ ᤛᤡᤲᤜ ᤆᤣᤶᤈᤥᤅ ᤗᤡᤶᤒᤢ), Bijaypur was the capital of the then Limbuwan Kingdom of king Bijayanarayan Raya khebang. According to others, Bijayapur was named after King Bijaya.

== History ==
According to history, it is the tomb of the last Limbu king Buddhi Karna Raya Khebang Limbu of Limbuwan (Pallo kirat), He was tricked into coming to Bijaypur-Dharan for a negotiation, then killed by the assassins of Gurkhali King Prithvi Narayan Shah of the Kingdom of Nepal in 1773. Budhhi Karna Khebang's soul is believed to have wandered around the area of his tomb around Bijaypur and was said to be a friendly and helpful spirit. Then local Limbu people started worshiping the soul as an old king (Hang means King in Limbu language) believing it to bring good luck.

== Mythology ==
Some say Lord Shiva and Goddess Parvati under the guise of Theba Sammang and Yuma Sammang, Yakthung King and Queen in the process of hunting arrived at Vijaypur where they stuck their bows and sat in a penance. During then, they realized the approach of Kali Yuga and immediately disappeared. From the bows sprouted bamboo shoots without the tuft.

== Bamboo writings and threads ==
In the vicinity of the temple, initially there was a trend of writing on the bamboo tree. The young men who came to visit the temple would return only by writing a name on bamboo as it is believed that writing the name of lovers will give success in their love. But, the temple committee has stopped the name writings on the bamboo as the name writings of the bamboo hampered the growth of the bamboo with the increase in bamboo writings. Nowadays, lovers tie sacred threads to the bamboo after worshiping Budha subba. The translation is as follows. "Will go to Budha Subba to write on bamboo trees today! How long should I stay thinking that you will come...
