= Gurkha Memorial Park =

Memorial park in Dharan, Nepal

- Interactive map of Gurkha Memorial Park
- Type: Public, memorial park
- Location: Dharan, Nepal
- Coordinates: 26.8354°N 87.2496°E
- Status: Open year round

Gurkha Memorial Park was established in Dharan, Nepal, "to preserve the legacy of Brigade of Gurkhas in Dharan for posterity before it is forgotten and lost forever", as many Nepalese men, many of whom were residents of Dharan, joined the Brigade of Gurkhas.
