= Dantakali Temple =

Hindu temple in Nepal

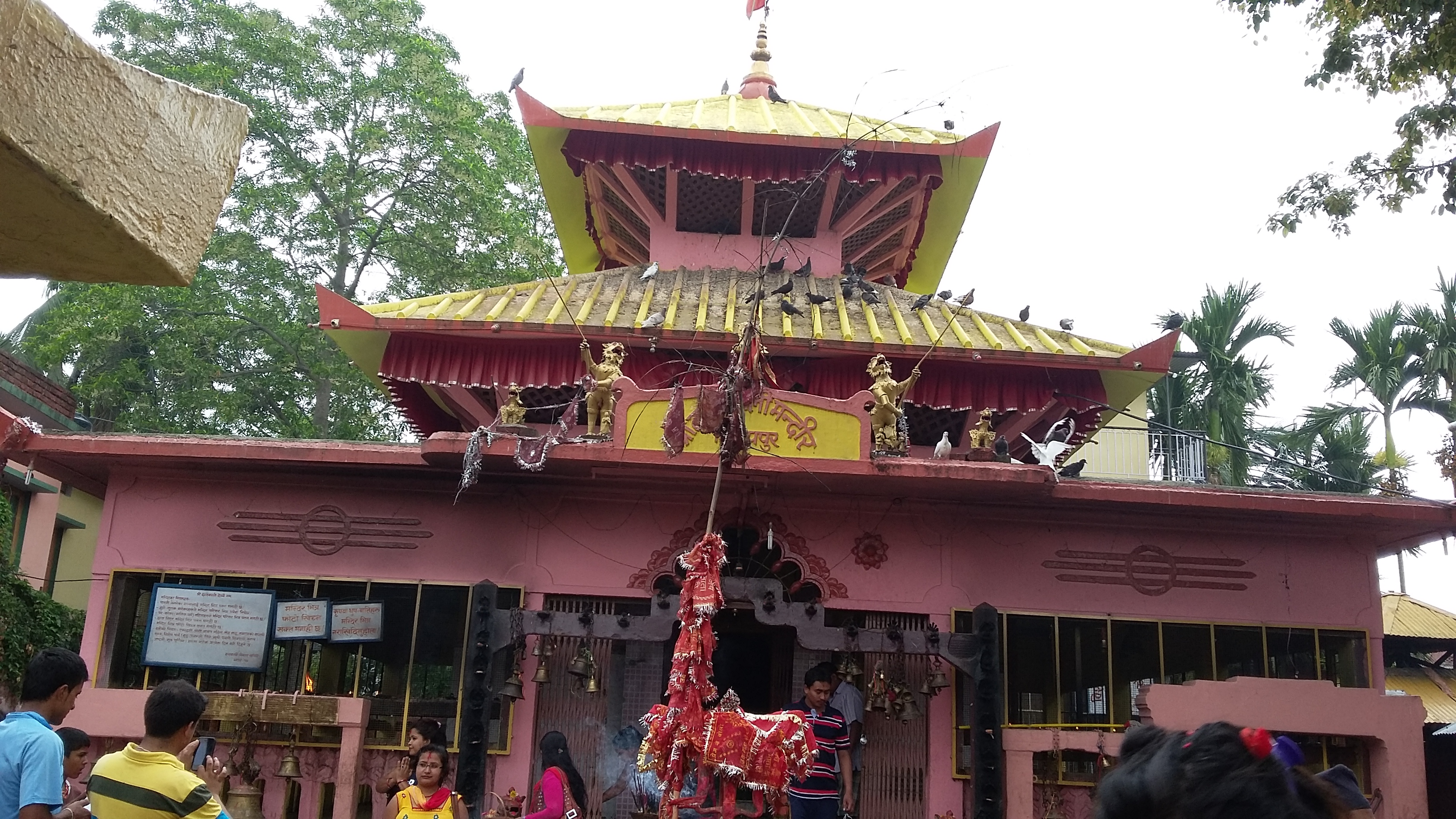
- Front view of Dantakali Temple

- Location within Nepal

Religion
- Affiliation: Hinduism
- District: Sunsari
- Deity: Satidevi
- Festivals: Navaratri, Dashain

Location
- Location: Dharan, Sunsari
- State: Koshi
- Country: Nepal
- Interactive map of Dantakali Temple
- Coordinates: 26.8186°N 87.2909°E

Architecture
- Type: Pagoda
- Elevation: 479.1456 m (1,572 ft)

Dantakali Temple is a Hindu temple situated in the mountains of Bijayapur in Dharan, Nepal. Dantakali is named for the teeth of the goddess Satidevi. Danta means teeth and Kali is a Hindu goddess.
