= 2022 Dharan municipal election =

Nepalese election

2022 Dharan municipal elections
- 13 May 2022

102 seats to Dharan Sub-Metropolitan City Council 52 seats needed for a majority

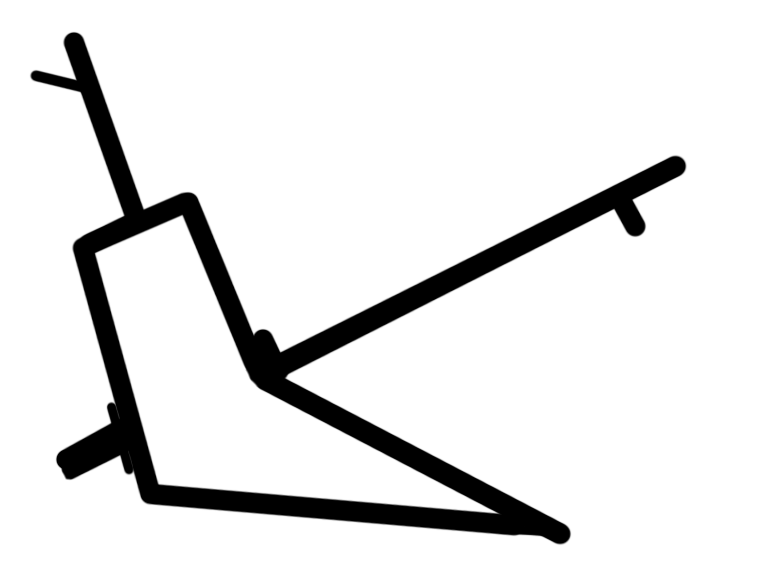
| | First party | Second party |
|---|---|---|
| Candidate | Harka Raj Rai | Kishore Rai |
| Party | Independent | Congress |
| Popular vote | 20,821 | 16,051 |
| Percentage | 39.8% | 30.7% |
| | Third party | Fourth party |
| Candidate | Manju Bhandari Subedi | Naresh Kumar Shakya |
| Party | CPN (UML) | RPP |
| Popular vote | 12,825 | 1,488 |
| Percentage | 24.5% | 2.8% |
Mayor before election
Tilak Rai
Congress
Elected Mayor
Harka Raj Rai
Independent

Municipal election for Dharan took place on 13 May 2022, with all 102 positions up for election across 20 wards. The electorate elected a mayor, a deputy mayor, 20 ward chairs and 80 ward members. An indirect election will also be held to elect five female members and an additional three female members from the Dalit and minority community to the municipal executive.

Independent candidate Harka Raj Rai was elected as the mayor of the sub-metropolitan city.

== Background ==
Dharan was established in 1958 as a municipality. The sub-metropolitan was created in 2014 by incorporating neighboring village development committees into Dharan municipality. Electors in each ward elect a ward chair and four ward members, out of which two must be female and one of the two must belong to the Dalit community.

In the previous election, Tara Subba from the CPN (Unified Marxist–Leninist) was elected as the mayor but after he died on 18 July 2018, Tilak Rai from the Nepali Congress was elected as mayor in a by-election in 2019.

== Candidates ==
| Party | Mayor candidate |
|---|---|
| Nepali Congress | Kishor Rai |
| CPN (Unified Marxist–Leninist) | Manju Bhandari |
| Independent | Harka Raj Rai |

== Opinion poll ==
| Date | News agency | Sample size | Harka Sampang | Sagar Thapa | Manju Bhandari | Others/Undecided | Result |
|---|---|---|---|---|---|---|---|
| 5 May 2022 | Setopati | 100 | 36 | 22 | 18 | 24 | Hung |
| 5 May 2022 | Setopati | 100 | 36% | 22% | 18% | 24% | Hung |

== Exit polls ==
| Date | Pollster | Rai | Bhandari | Sampang | Shakya | Others | Lead |
| Date | Pollster | Congress | UML | Ind | RPP | Others | Lead |
|---|---|---|---|---|---|---|---|
| 13 May 2022 | Facts Nepal | 36.7% | 1.5% | 18.7% | 5.2% | 8.9% | 6.2% |

== Results ==
=== Mayoral election ===
Mayoral elections result
| Party | Candidate | Votes | % | ±% |
|---|---|---|---|---|
| Independent | Harka Raj Rai | 20,821 | 39.8% | +39.0% |
| Congress | Kishore Rai | 16,051 | 30.7% | −19.0% |
| CPN (UML) | Manju Bhandari Subedi | 12,825 | 24.5% | −20% |
| RPP | Naresh Kumar Shakya | 1,488 | 2.8% | +2.5% |
| Others | | 1,142 | 2.2% | |
| Total votes | | 52,335 | 100.0% | |
| Rejected ballots | | 10,562 | | |
| Turnout | | 62,897 | | |
| Registered electors | | 100,324 | | |
| Independent gain from Congress | | Swing | +29.0% | |

Results for ward chair by party Nepali Congress CPN (Unified Marxist-Leninist) CPN (Maoist Centre) Rastriya Prajatantra Party

Deputy mayoral elections result
| Party | Candidate | Votes | % | ±% |
|---|---|---|---|---|
| Maoist Centre | Aindra Bikram Begha Limbu | 20,510 | 45.0% | New |
| CPN (UML) | Padam Prasad Limbu | 17,606 | 38.6% | −9.7% |
| Independent | Dutta Kumar Limbu | 4,129 | 9.1% | New |
| RPP | Purna Maya Rai | 2,237 | 4.9% | +3.8% |
| Others | | 1,116 | 2.4% | |
| Total votes | | 45,598 | 100.0% | |
| Rejected ballots | | 17,299 | | |
| Turnout | | 62,897 | | |
| Registered electors | | 100,324 | | |
| Maoist Centre gain from CPN (UML) | | Swing | +27.4% | |

=== Ward results ===
Partywise Ward chairman and Ward member seats won, 2022
| Political Party | Ward Chairman | Ward Members |
|---|---|---|
| CPN (Unified Marxist-Leninist) | 10 | 46 |
| Nepali Congress | 7 | 30 |
| CPN (Maoist Centre) | 1 | 4 |
| Rastriya Prajatantra Party | 1 | 0 |
| Independent | 1 | 0 |
| Total | 20 | 80 |

=== Summary of results by ward ===
| Position | 1 | 2 | 3 | 4 | 5 | 6 | 7 | 8 | 9 | 10 | 11 | 12 | 13 | 14 | 15 | 16 | 17 | 18 | 19 | 20 |
|---|---|---|---|---|---|---|---|---|---|---|---|---|---|---|---|---|---|---|---|---|
| Ward Chairman | | | | | | | | | | | | | | | | | | | | |
| Ward Member 1 | | | | | | | | | | | | | | | | | | | | |
| Ward Member 2 | | | | | | | | | | | | | | | | | | | | |
| Female Member | | | | | | | | | | | | | | | | | | | | |
| Female Dalit Member | | | | | | | | | | | | | | | | | | | | |
Source: Election Commission

== Council formation ==
| Party | Mayor | Deputy Mayor | Ward Chairman | Ward Members | Total seats | Remarks |
|---|---|---|---|---|---|---|
| Independent | 1 | | 1 | | 2 | |
| Communist Party of Nepal (UML) | | | 10 | 46 | 56 | Majority |
| Nepali Congress | | | 7 | 30 | 37 | |
| CPN (Maoist Centre) | | 1 | 1 | 4 | 6 | |
| Rastriya Prajatantra Party | | | 1 | 0 | 1 | |
| Total | 1 | 1 | 20 | 80 | 102 | 52 for Majority |

== See also ==
- 2022 Nepalese local elections
- 2022 Lalitpur municipal election
- 2022 Kathmandu municipal election
- 2022 Janakpur municipal election
- 2022 Pokhara municipal election
