= Dharan =

Sub-Metropolitan City in Koshi Province

Dharan धरान
- Sub-Metropolitan City
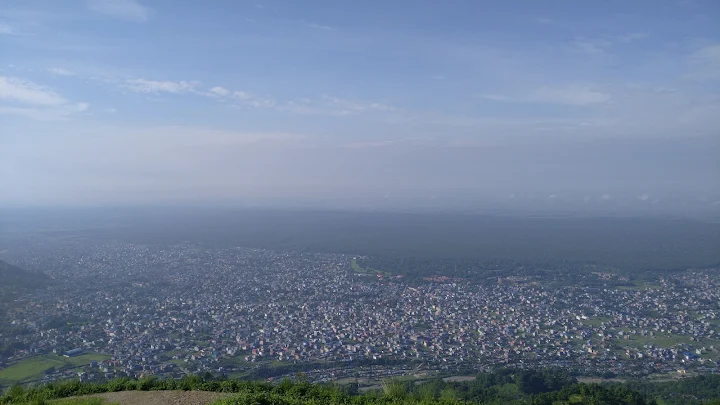
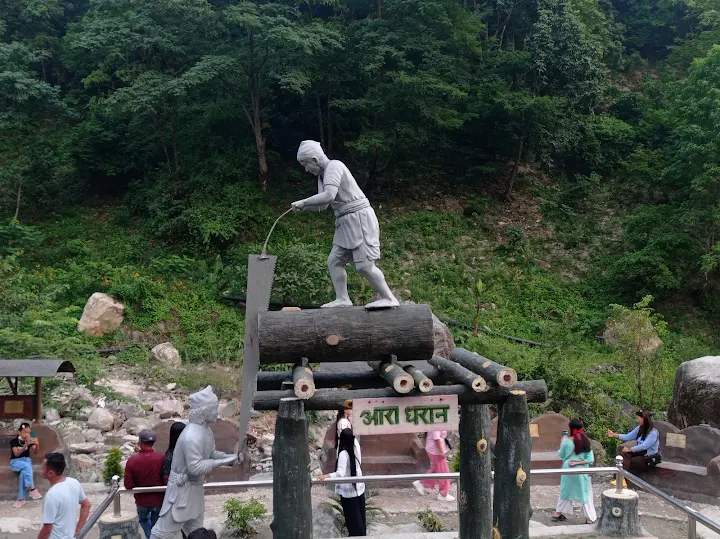
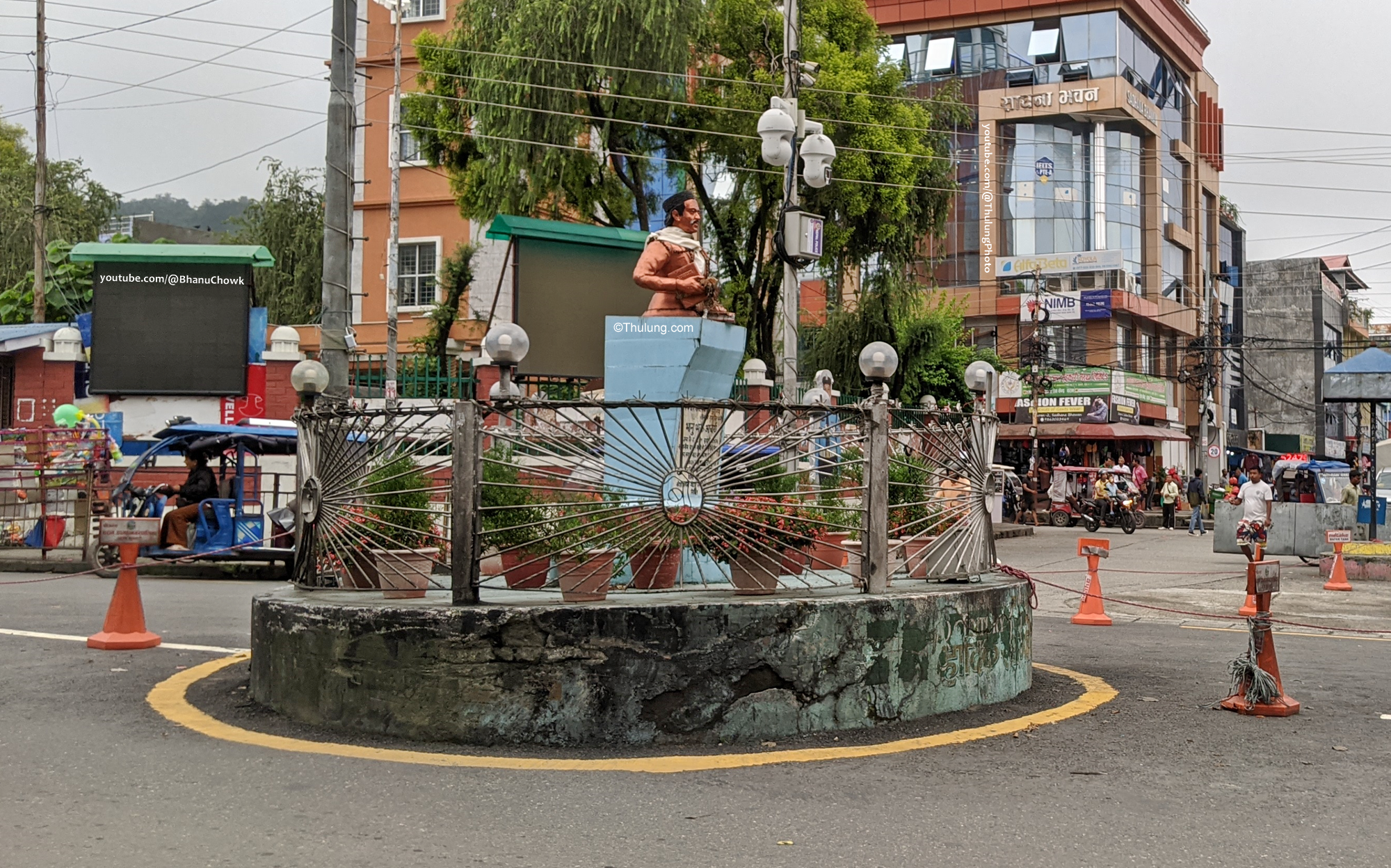
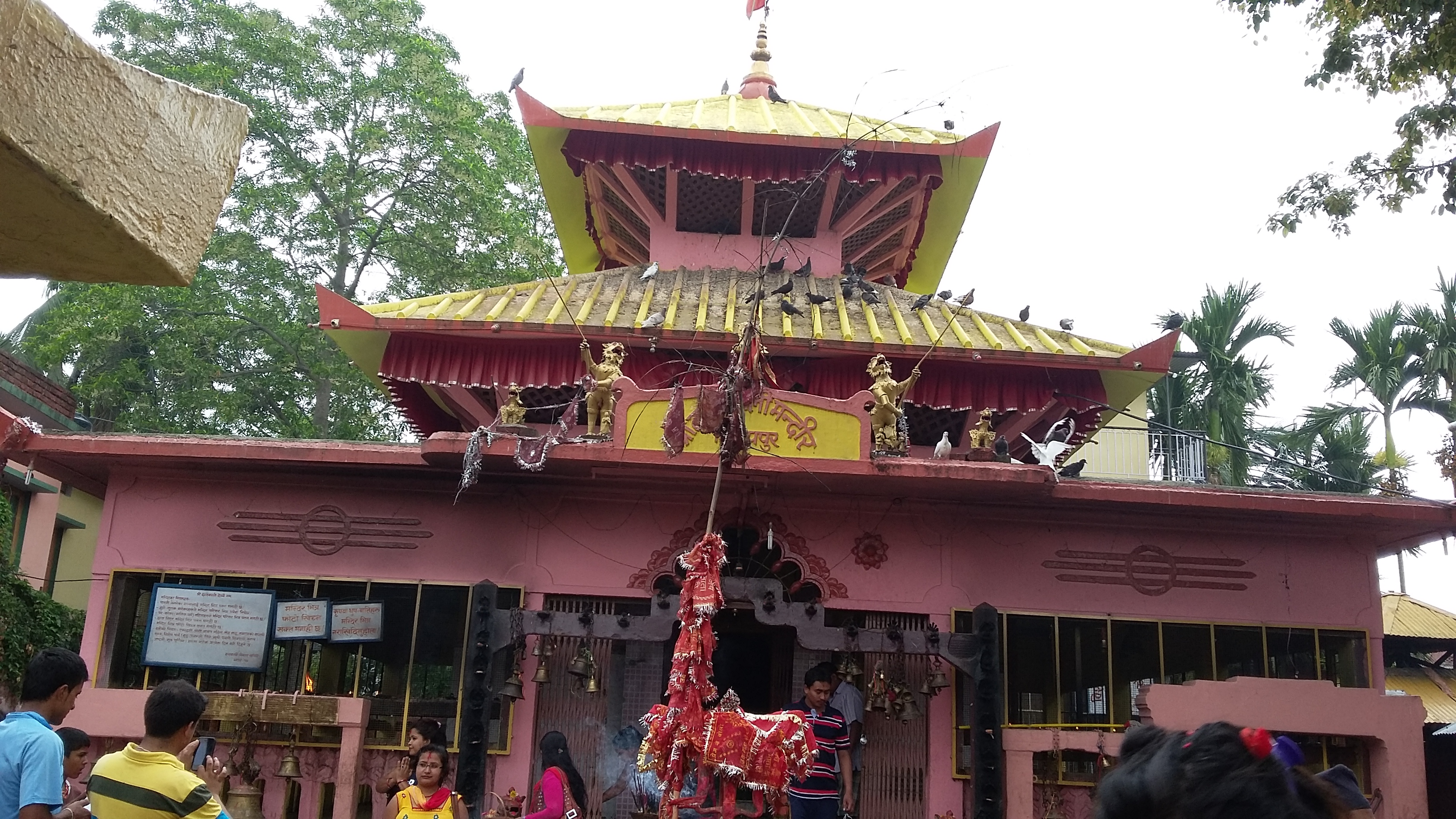
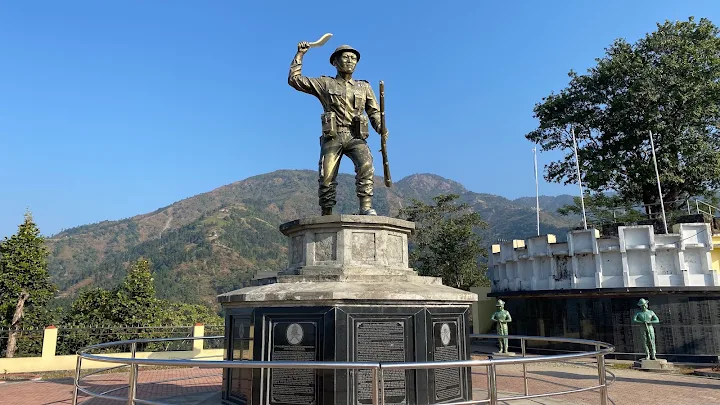
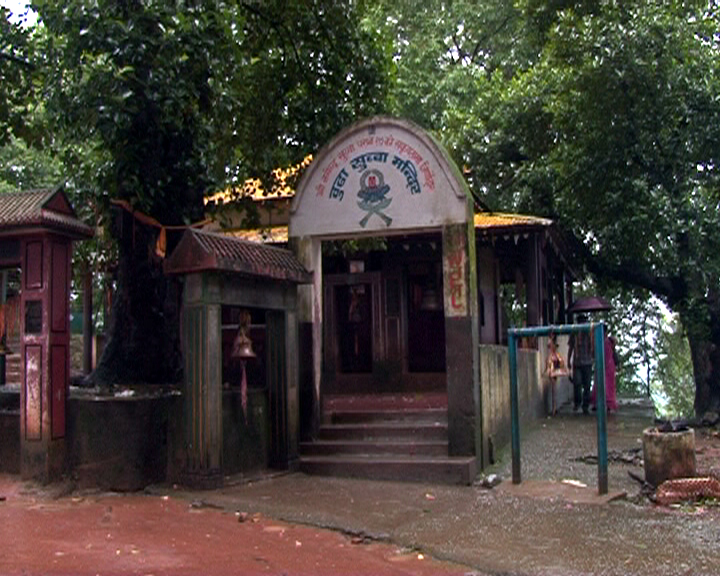
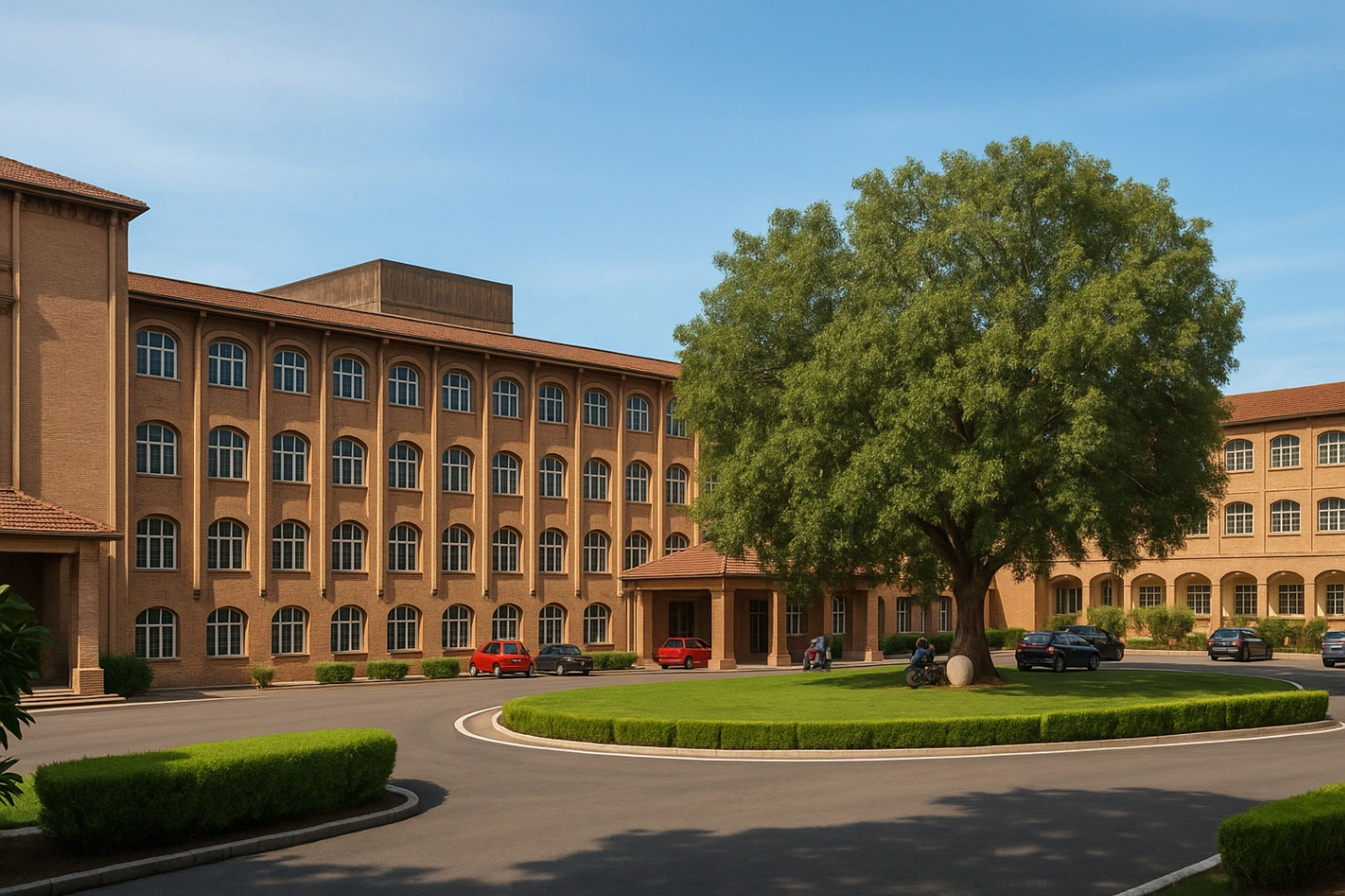
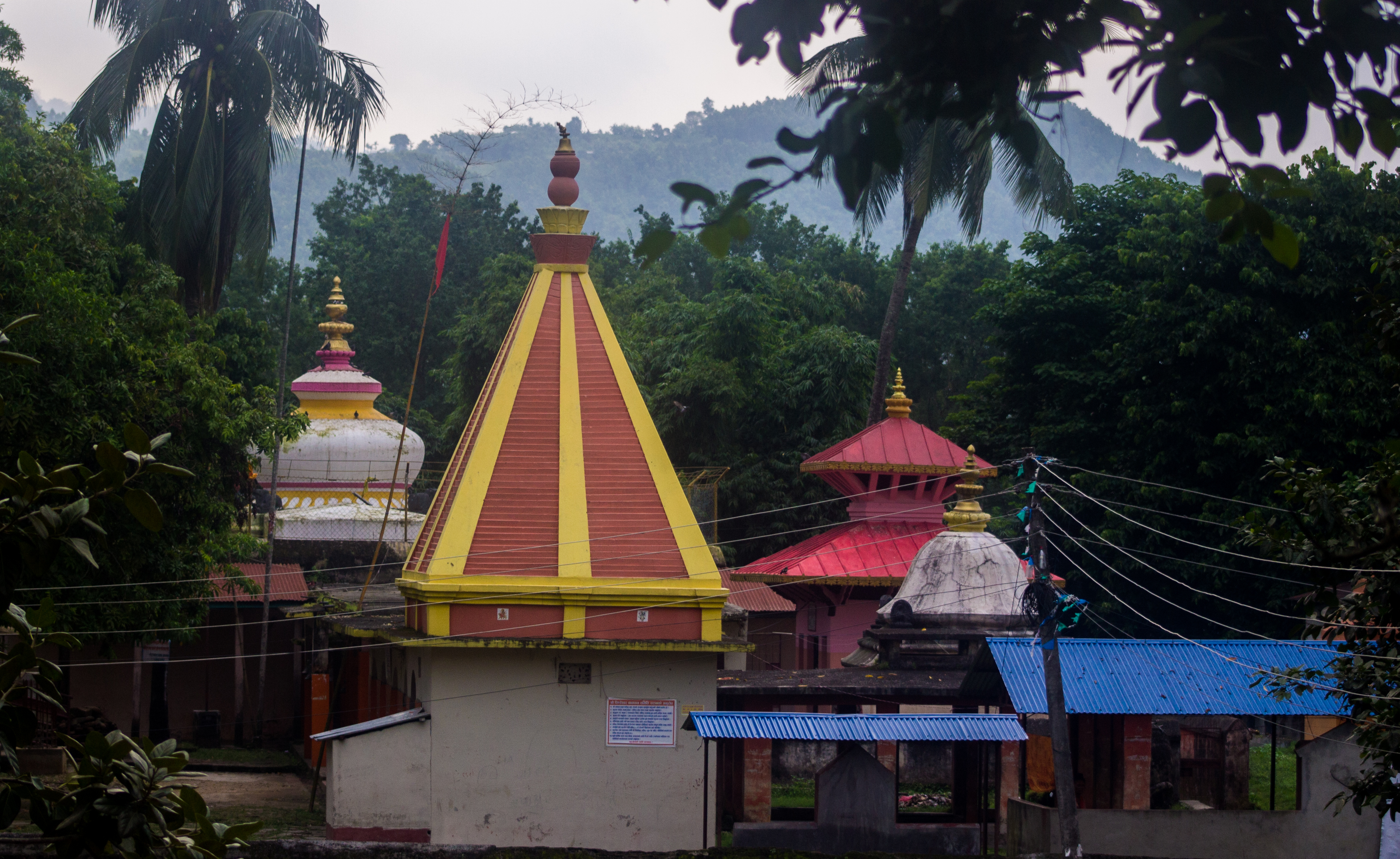
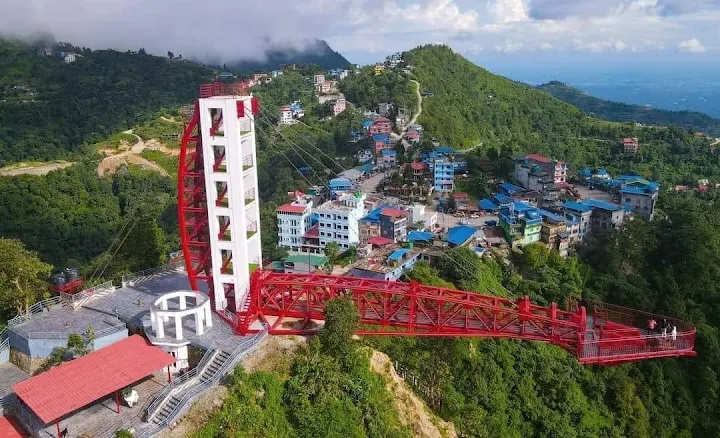
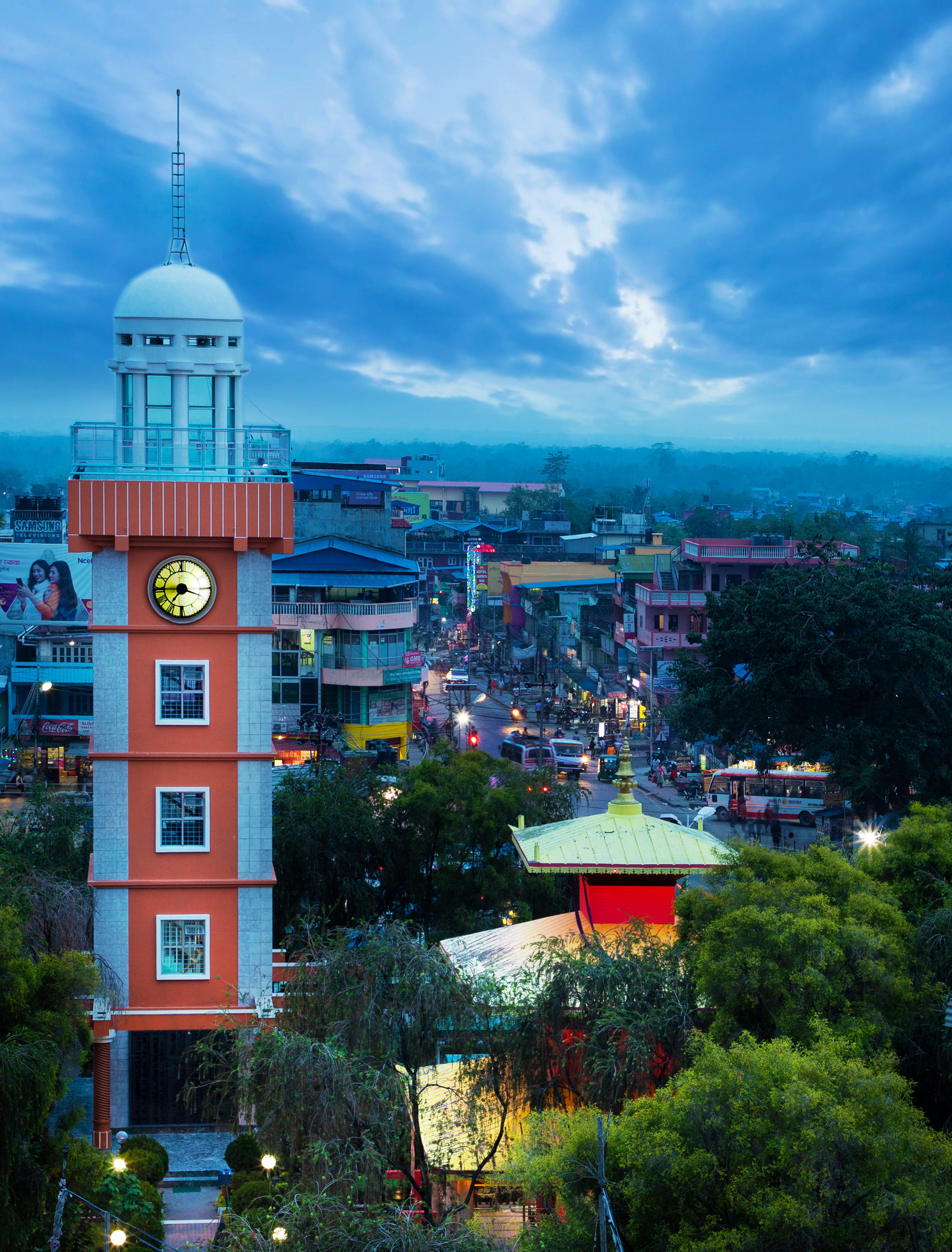
- Clockwise from top left: view of Dharan from Chinde Dada, Ara Dharan(Shram Sanskriti Park), Bhanu Chowk, Dantakali Temple, Gurkha Memorial Park, Budha Subba Temple, B. P. Koirala Institute of Health Sciences, Pindeshwor Temple, Skywalk of Bhedetar view point, Dharan Clock Tower
- Nicknames: लाहुरेहरुको शहर (City of the British/Indian Gurkha soldiers), Fashion Capital of Nepal
- Motto: "To build an environmentally sound city, functioning as the centre of education, health, tourism and business with fully developed infrastructure"
- Location within Koshi Province Location within Nepal
- Coordinates: 26°49′0″N 87°17′0″E
- Country: Nepal
- Province: Koshi
- District: Sunsari
- First Settled: 1902
- Established: 1958
- Upgraded to Sub-metropolitan city: 2017
- Founder: Sete Kaji Shrestha
- No. of Wards: 20

Government
  - Mayor: Vacant
  - Deputy Mayor: Aindra Begha Limbu (Maiost)

Area
  - Total: 74.37 sq mi (192.61 km^{2})
  - Water: 1.7 sq mi (4.4 km^{2})
- 108,600 sq mi (281,000 km^{2})
- Highest elevation (Near Bhedetar): 5,833 ft (1,778 m)
- Lowest elevation (at Tarahara): 390 ft (119 m)

Population (2022)
  - Total: 166,531
  - Rank: 15th (Nepal); 3rd (Koshi Province)
  - Density: 2,239.3/sq mi (864.60/km^{2})

Languages
  - Official: Nepali
  - Additional: English, Limbu
- Time zone: UTC+5:45 (NST)
- Postal Code: 56700 (Sunsari), 56702 (Mangalbare)
- Telephone code: 025
- Climate: Cwa
- Website: www.dharan.gov.np

Dharan (Nepali: धरान) is a sub-metropolitan city in Sunsari District of Koshi Province, in eastern Nepal. It was established as the fourth municipality in the Kingdom of Nepal in 1958. It is the third most populous city in eastern Nepal after Biratnagar and Itahari. The Nepali word "dharan" means a saw pit.

In 1960, a British Gurkha camp was also established near the city. The use of the camp by British Gurkhas ended in the mid-1990s. Dharan has an estimated city population of 173,096 living in 34,834 households as per the 2021 Nepal census. It is one of the cities of the Greater Birat Development Area which incorporates the cities of Biratnagar-Itahari-Gothgau-Biratchowk-Dharan primarily located on Koshi Highway in eastern Nepal, with an estimated total urban agglomerated population of 804,300 people living in 159,332 households. It is the largest city in the Koshi Province by area, at 192.61 square kilometres; Biratnagar and Itahari are the second- and third-largest cities by area respectively.

== Geography ==
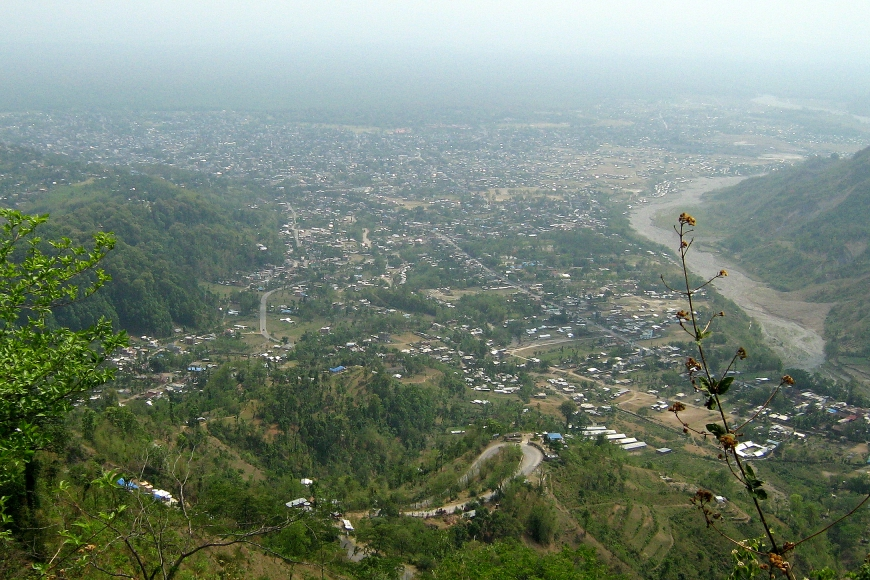
Dharan from above

Dharan is situated on the foothills of the Mahabharat Range in the north with its southern tip touching the edge of the Terai plains. The city sits at an altitude of 1148 ft (349 m). Dharan Bazaar grew near Phusre, where the old walking route to Dhankuta and a large part of the Eastern hills left the plains with the ascent of Sanghuri Danra. Historically, hill villagers made annual treks to the plains for trade, making this a natural location for a marketplace at the junction of the hills and the Terai. In 1952, the construction of the Kosi barrage began and a narrow gauge railway was built to take stone from Phusre, loaded at a locality now known as "Railway", to the site of the barrage near the Indian border.

Koshi Highway runs through the city, connecting Dharan to Biratnagar and Itahari, where it links to the east–west Mahendra Highway. The highway also extends north to Kimathanka at the Nepal-China border. The road from Dharan to Dhankuta was funded by the United Kingdom under the Overseas Development Administration aid scheme. The construction began in 1976 and was substantially completed by mid-1982. The road, which measures 51 km in length, was largely built by hand using local labor, with as many as 15,000 workers employed at the height of the project.

== History ==
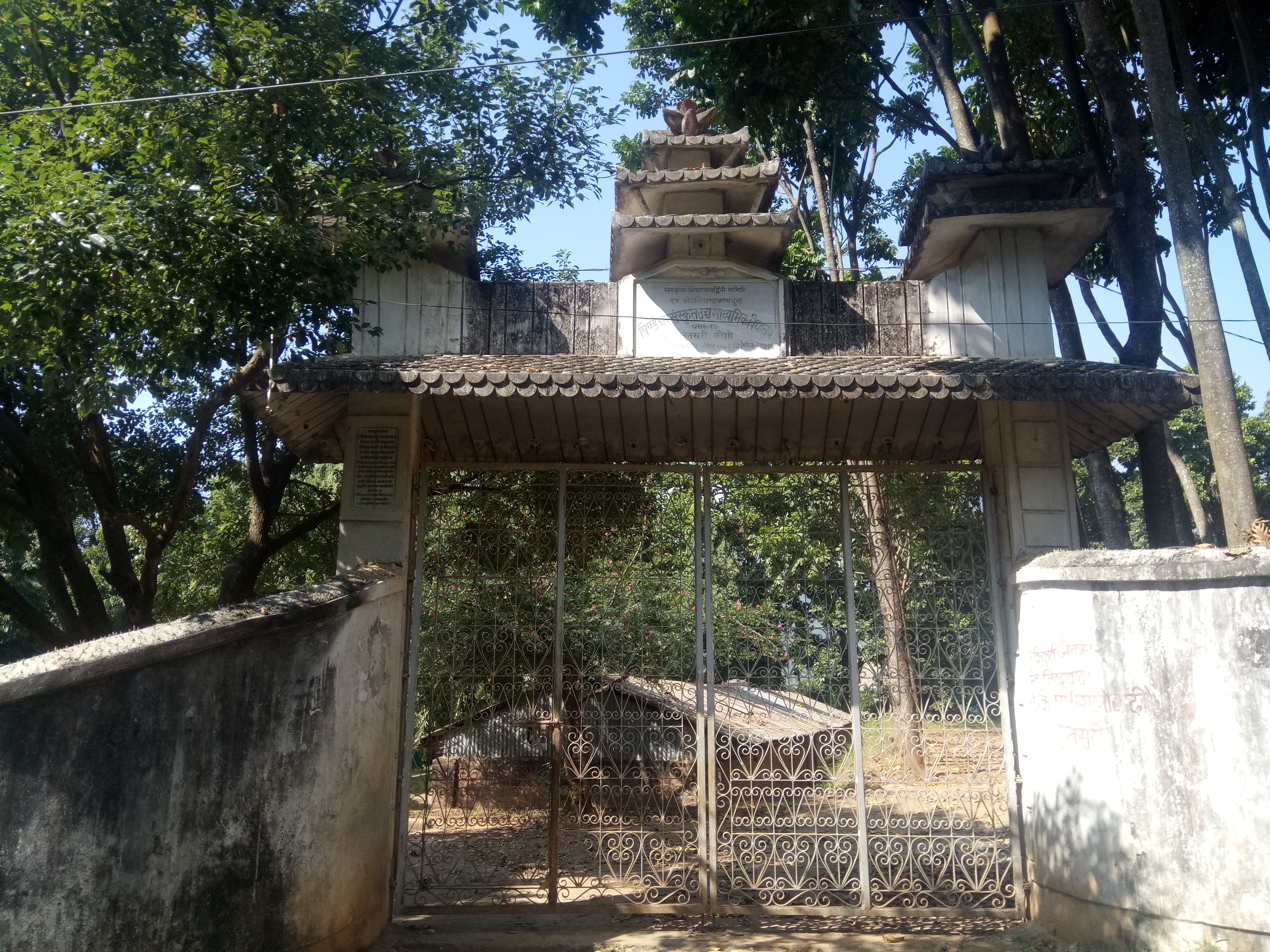
Bijayapur gate old city of modern Dharan

Dharan got its name from the Nepali word for a platform on which wood is sawed, because these first settlers used the platforms to work the trees they chopped in the forest. Dharan’s history linked to Vijayapur, an important political centre of the Morang/Vijayapur state associated with the Kirat chiefs and rulers of eastern Nepal. The area is also renowned for its religious heritage, including Dantakali, Pindeshwar and Budhasubba.

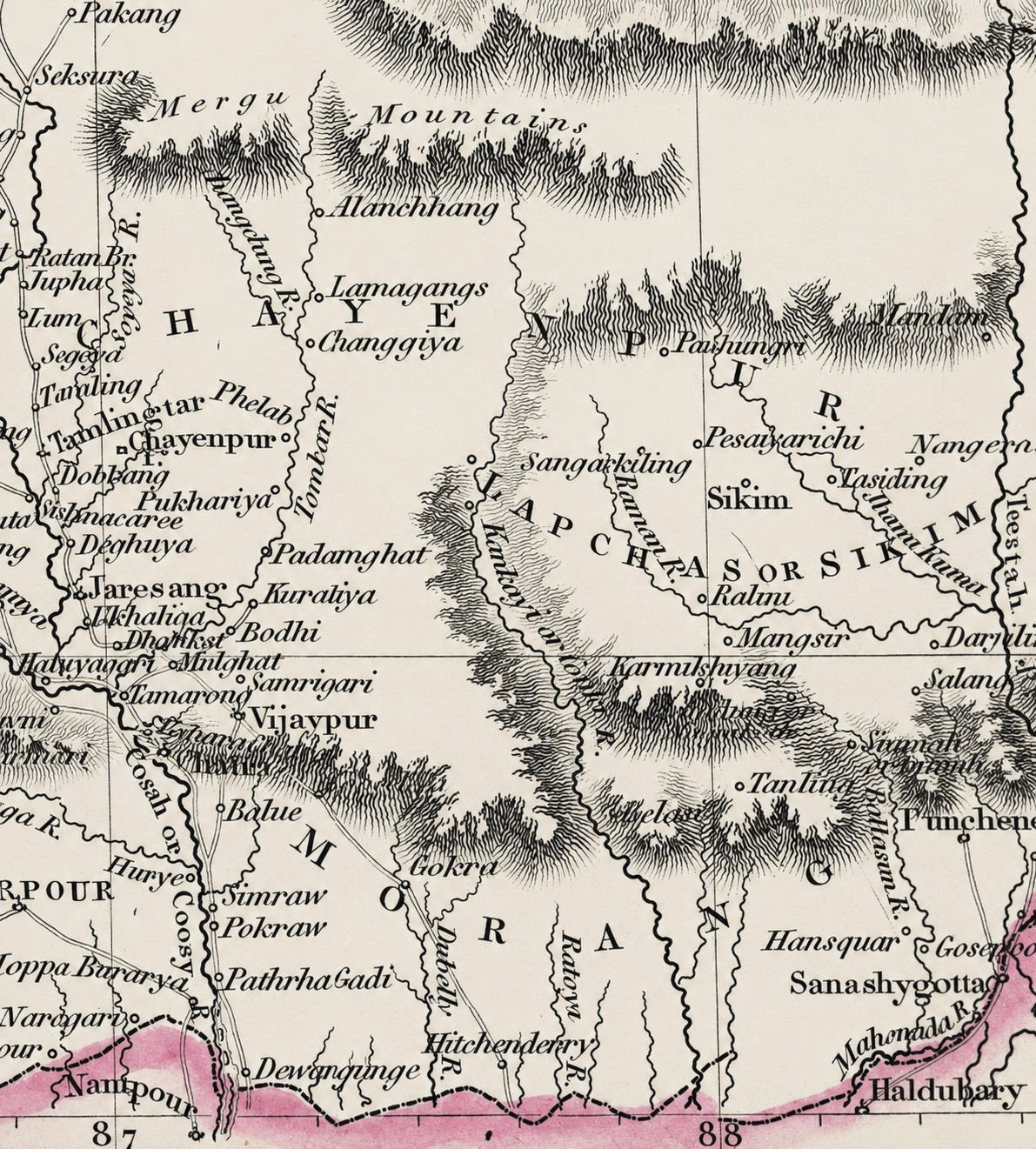
map of 1817 showing Chayanpoor in the North, Sikkim in the East and Vijaypur/Dharan area probably important city of Morang state.

Modern Dharan developed after the forest was cleared in the early 20th century. In 1902/03, Prime Minister Chandra Shumsher Jung Bahadur Rana established Chandranagar (present Purano Bazar). Later, Juddanagar (New Bazar) and the British British Gurkha recruitment centre accelerated urban growth. Dharan subsequently developed into a major multicultural, commercial and tourism centre of eastern Nepal

== Demographics ==
Religion in Dharan (2021)
Religion	Percent
Hindusim	45%
kirat	35%
Buddhism	9.5%
Christianity	8.6%
Others	1.9%

=== Languages ===
Language in Dharan census (2021)
1. Nepali (42.5%)
2. Limbu (10.1%)
3. Maithili (8.00%)
4. Newar (7.40%)
5. Rai (5.90%)
6. Tamang (5.90%)
7. Bantawa (5.80%)
8. Others (14.4%)

At the time of the 2021 Census of Nepal, 42.5% of the population in the city spoke Nepali, 10.1% Limbu, 8.0% Maithili, 7.4% Newar, 5.9% Rai, 5.9% Tamang, 5.8% Bantawa, and 14.4% spoke other smaller languages as their first language.

=== Caste and ethnic groups ===
Broad caste and ethnicity category (2021 Census)
Broad ethnic category	Sub-category	Linguistic family	Population percentage
Janajati (Hill ethnic groups)	Magar, Tamang, Gurung, Sherpa, Rai, Limbu, Yakkha, Sunuwar	Tibeto-Burman	37.74
Khas (Hill/Pahari caste groups)	Khas Brahmin, Chhetri, Kami, Damai Sarki, Sanyasi/Dasnami	Indo-Aryan	24.8
Newar (Kathmandu Valley caste groups)	Newari Brahmin, Shrestha, Tamrakar, Newar Buddhist, Maharjan, Rajkarnikar	Tibeto-Burman	11.1%
Madeshi (Terai caste groups)	Yadav, Maithil Brahmins, Chamar, Kushwaha, Musahar, Kurmi, Dhanuk	Indo-Aryan	11.0%
Marwadi, Bengalis	-	Indo-Aryan	3.4%
Adibasi (Terai Indigenous groups)	Tharu, Rajbanshi	Indo-Aryan and Indigenous people of Nepal	2.3%
Muslim	-	Indo-Aryan	1.3%
Others	-	-	3.1%

== Environment ==
A study conducted in 2016 to analyze the bacteriological quality of bottled drinking water and that of municipal tap water in Dharan found that one hundred percent of the tap water samples and 87.5% of the bottled water samples were contaminated with heterotrophic bacteria. Of the tap water samples, 55.3% were positive for total coliforms, compared with 25% of the bottled water, but no bottled water samples were positive for fecal coliforms and fecal streptococci, in contrast to 21.1% and 14.5% of the tap water samples being contaminated with fecal coliforms and fecal streptococci, respectively. One hundred percent of the tap water samples and 54.2% of the bottled water samples had pH in the acceptable range.

== Media and communication ==
- Newspapers: The people of Dharan are served by several daily local newspapers and national newspapers. There are 11 local newspapers in total. These include The Blast Times and The Morning Times. National newspapers are also provided to the people of Dharan on a daily basis. National newspapers include The Kathmandu Post, Kantipur, Annapurna Post, and Himalayan Times. Several monthly neighborhood papers serve the town.
- Radio: The state-owned Radio Nepal is broadcast on the medium wave on 648 kHz in the city. Five private local FM stations are available. They are Star FM - 95.6 MHz, Vijayapur FM - 98.8 MHz, Dantakali FM - 88.5 MHz, and Radio Dharan FM - 88.8 MHz. Radio Ganatantra FM 95.1 MHz is a community radio station. Likewise, Dharan has a BFBS Radio Relay station. It broadcasts on FM frequencies.
- Television: Nepal's state-owned television broadcaster, Nepal Television's relay station is present near its border, which provides two free-to-air terrestrial channels. A mix of Nepali, Hindi, English, and other international channels are accessible via cable subscription and direct-broadcast satellite services. Dharan Cable Network broadcasts Kriti Television Channel as a local television channel that covers events in the city.

== Climate ==
Climate data for Dharan, elevation 310 m (1,020 ft), (1991–2020 normals, extremes 1998–2017)
Month	Jan	Feb	Mar	Apr	May	Jun	Jul	Aug	Sep	Oct	Nov	Dec	Year
Record high °C (°F)	29.5 (85.1)	32.7 (90.9)	36.7 (98.1)	38.8 (101.8)	37.5 (99.5)	37.9 (100.2)	38.7 (101.7)	37.4 (99.3)	35.9 (96.6)	35.8 (96.4)	33.0 (91.4)	29.9 (85.8)	38.8 (101.8)
Mean daily maximum °C (°F)	22.8 (73.0)	26.0 (78.8)	30.4 (86.7)	32.8 (91.0)	32.7 (90.9)	32.4 (90.3)	31.9 (89.4)	32.3 (90.1)	31.9 (89.4)	31.0 (87.8)	28.4 (83.1)	25.0 (77.0)	29.8 (85.6)
Daily mean °C (°F)	17.0 (62.6)	20.2 (68.4)	24.2 (75.6)	27.1 (80.8)	27.7 (81.9)	28.3 (82.9)	28.2 (82.8)	28.5 (83.3)	27.8 (82.0)	26.0 (78.8)	22.7 (72.9)	19.2 (66.6)	24.7 (76.5)
Mean daily minimum °C (°F)	11.2 (52.2)	14.3 (57.7)	17.9 (64.2)	21.3 (70.3)	22.7 (72.9)	24.1 (75.4)	24.5 (76.1)	24.6 (76.3)	23.7 (74.7)	20.9 (69.6)	16.9 (62.4)	13.3 (55.9)	19.6 (67.3)
Record low °C (°F)	3.5 (38.3)	6.6 (43.9)	7.6 (45.7)	11.6 (52.9)	15.2 (59.4)	18.3 (64.9)	19.5 (67.1)	20.2 (68.4)	19.6 (67.3)	15.0 (59.0)	11.2 (52.2)	5.2 (41.4)	3.5 (38.3)
Average precipitation mm (inches)	10.4 (0.41)	14.2 (0.56)	29.9 (1.18)	71.5 (2.81)	162.3 (6.39)	317.8 (12.51)	547.6 (21.56)	461.0 (18.15)	344.5 (13.56)	121.2 (4.77)	12.7 (0.50)	3.9 (0.15)	2,097 (82.6)
Source: Department of Hydrology and Meteorology

== Notable people ==
- Hari Nath Bastola, politician
- Malina Joshi, Miss Nepal 2011
- Deepak Limbu, singer
- Subin Limbu, Miss Nepal 2014
- Miruna Magar, actress
- Harka Raj Rai, former mayor of Dharan, social activist, and leader of a public mobilization movement
- Krishna Kumar Rai, politician
- Sabin Rai, singer
- Minendra Rijal, politician and MP
- Bhola Rijal, doctor and lyricist
- Prashna Shakya, singer
- Raju Kaji Shakya, former captain of the national football team
- Deep Shrestha, singer and music composer
- Namrata Shrestha, actress
- Govinda Subba, first governor of Koshi Province
- Malvika Subba, Miss Nepal 2002
- Sirjana Shrestha, politician, entrepreneur, and Pratinidhi Sabha member

== See also ==
- List of educational institutions in Dharan
- 2022 Dharan municipal election
- Bhanu Chowk
