= 2022 Biratnagar municipal election =

2nd Nepalese local election

2022 Biratnagar municipal elections
← 2017	13 May 2022	2027 →

97 seats to Biratnagar Metropolitan City Council 49 seats needed for a majority

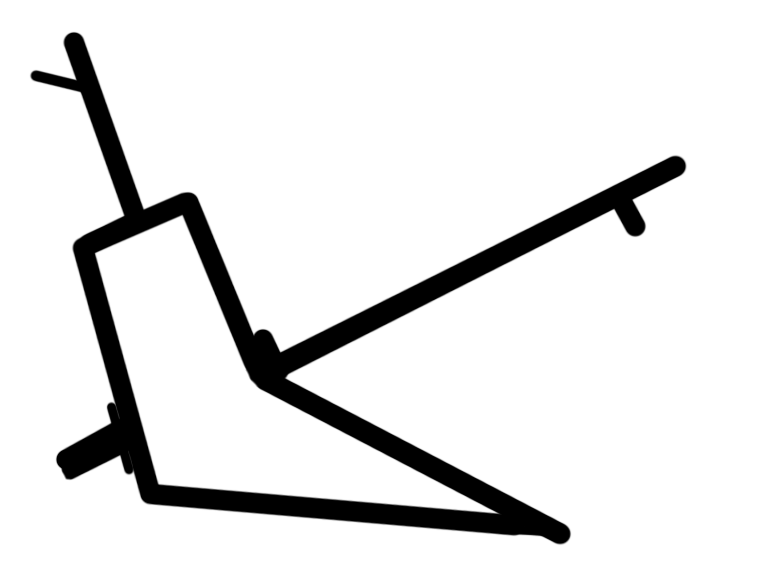

	First party	Second party	Third party
Leader	Nagesh Koirala	Sagar Thapa	Umesh Kumar Yadav
Party	Nepali Congress	CPN (UML)	Independent
Seats before	50	14	1
Seats won	39	44	3
Seat change	▼11	▲30	▲2
Popular vote	30,170	21,455	8,795
Percentage	44.3%	31.5%	12.9%
	Fourth party	Fifth party	Sixth party
Leader	Prahlad Prasad Shah
Party	RPP	PSP-Nepal	Maoist Centre
Seats before	0	27	5
Seats won	1	10	0
Seat change	▲1	▼17	▼5
Popular vote	5,216
Percentage	7.7%
Mayor before election
Bhim Parajuli
Congress
Elected mayor
Nagesh Koirala
Congress

Municipal election for Biratnagar took place on 13 May 2022, with all 122 positions up for election across 19 wards. The electorate elected a mayor, a deputy mayor, 19 ward chairs and 76 ward members. An indirect election will also be held to elect five female members and an additional three female members from the Dalit and minority community to the municipal executive.

Nagesh Koirala from Nepali Congress was elected as the new mayor of Metropolitan city.

== Background ==
The first election after the city was declared as a metropolitan city was held in 2017. Electors in each ward elect a ward chair and four ward members, out of which two must be female and one of the two must belong to the Dalit community.

Bhim Parajuli from Nepali Congress was elected as the first mayor of the metropolitan city in the previous election.

== Candidates ==
In accordance with the decision of central leaders of Nepali Congress, CPN (Maoist Centre), People's Socialist Party, CPN (Unified Socialist) and Rastriya Janamorcha, an alliance was created to contest local elections in some local units. In Biratnagar, Nagesh Koirala from Nepali Congress was the candidate for mayor from the alliance and Amrendra Yadav from People's Socialist party was the candidate for deputy mayor.

=== Mayoral candidates ===
Party (Note: In order published by Election Commission)	Mayor candidate
Nepali Congress (supported by CPN (MC), CPN (US) and PSPN)	Naagesh Koirala
CPN (Unified Marxist–Leninist)	Sagar Kumar Thapa
Janamat Party	Arun Kumar Mandal
Independent	Sakriya Gautam
Independent	Umesh Kumar Yadav
CPN (Socialist)	Sone Lal Rajbanshi
CPN (Marxist–Leninist)	Devi Paudel
Bibeksheel Sajha Party	Amalesh Kumar Karna
Rastriya Prajatantra Party	Prahlad Prasad Sah
Pichhadabarga Nishad Dalit Janajati Party	Pradeep Kumar Kamat
Nepali Congress (B.P.)	Ramchandra Prasad Gautam
Federal Democratic National Front	Nageshwar Singh Rajput
Loktantrik Samajwadi Party, Nepal	Mrityunjaya Kumar Mishra

=== Deputy mayoral candidates ===
Party	Deputy Mayor candidate
CPN (Unified Marxist–Leninist)	Shilpa Karki
Janamat Party	Anu Kumari Kamat
Independent	Ganga Devi Subedi
CPN (Socialist)	Laxmi Rajbanshi
Independent	Namita Neupane
Nepali Congress (B.P.)	Maya Ojha
Federal Democratic National Front	Chandrakala Sharma
Bibeksheel Sajha Party	Shriju Parajuli
Pichhadibarga Nishad Dalit Janajati Party	Hafizan Khatun
Independent	Basundhara Devi Jha
CPN (Marxist–Leninist)	Chandrakala Siwakoti
Rastriya Prajatantra Party	Bindra Kumari Acharya
Loktantrik Samajwadi Party, Nepal	Sahnaz Khatun
People's Socialist Party, Nepal (supported by NC, CPN (MC) and CPN (US))	Amarendra Yadav

== Opinion poll ==
Date	News agency	Sample size	Nagesh Koirala	Sagar Thapa	Umesh Yadav	Others/Undecided	Result
9 May 2022	Setopati	130	52	21	12	45	Hung
9 May 2022	Setopati	130	40%	16%	9%	35%	Hung

== Exit polls ==
Date	Pollster	Koirala	Thapa	Yadav	Sah	Others	Lead
Date	Pollster	Congress	UML	Ind.	RPP	Others	Lead
13 May 2022	Facts Nepal	49.0%	29.9%	12.5%	4.4%	4.2%	19.1%

== Results ==
=== Mayoral election ===
Mayoral elections result
Party	Candidate	Votes	%	±%
Congress	Naagesh Koirala	30,170	44.3%	+6.7%
CPN (UML)	Sagar Kumar Thapa	21,455	31.5%	+3.2%
Independent	Umesh Kumar Yadav	8,795	12.9%	−11.5%
RPP	Prahlad Prasad Shah	5,216	7.7%	−1.3%
Janamat	Arun Kumar Mandal	823	1.1%	New
Loktantrik Samajwadi	Mrityunjaya Kumar Mishra	620	0.9%	New
Others		959	1.4%	
Total votes		68,038	100.0%	
Rejected ballots		21,640		
Turnout		89,678		
Registered electors		133,142		
Congress hold				

=== Deputy mayoral election ===
Deputy mayoral elections result
Party	Candidate	Votes	%	±%
CPN (UML)	Shilpa Karki	25,680	46.5%	New
PSP-Nepal	Amarendra Yadav	14,219	25.7%	New
RPP	Binda Kumari Luitel	6,409	11.6%	+2.9%
Independent	Namita Neupane	5,117	9.3%	−15.2%
Janamat	Anu Kumari Kamat	1,133	2.1%	New
Loktantrik Samajwadi	Shahnaz Khatun	808	1.5%	New
Others		1,194	2.2%	
Total votes		55,229	100.0%	
Rejected ballots		34,449	100.0%	
Turnout		89,678		
Registered electors		133,142		
CPN (UML) gain from Congress		Swing	+55.9%	

=== Ward results ===
Results for ward chair by party

Summary of partywise ward chairpersons and ward member seats won, 2022
Party	Chairpersons	Members
CPN (Unified Marxist-Leninist)	9	33
Nepali Congress	6	33
People's Socialist Party, Nepal	2	8
Rastriya Prajatantra Party	1	0
Independent	1	2
Total	19	76

==== Summary of results by ward ====
Ward No.	Ward Chair	Ward Members			
Ward No.	Ward Chair	Open	Open 2	Female	Female Dalit
1	Kaji Bahadur Basnet				
2	Kumar Pokharel				
3	Basu Bahadur Basnet				
4	Jitan Thapa				
5	Santosh Neupane				
6	Harish Chandra Sahani				
7	Madhu Babu Tiwari				
8	Ram Pokharel				
9	Bishwanath Prasad Bhagat				
10	Arjun Giri				
11	Tirthendra Neupane				
12	Hira Lal Kamat				
13	Surya Lal Yadav				
14	Surya Narayan Mahato				
15	Prakash Sah				
16	Uddhav Kumar Bhujel				
17	Samim Kumar Miya				
18	Jitendra Kumar Shah				
19	Shyam Ghimire				

== Results for municipal executive election ==
The municipal executive consists of the mayor, who is also the chair of the municipal executive, the deputy mayor and ward chairs from each ward. The members of the municipal assembly will elect five female members and three members from the Dalit and minority community to the municipal executive.

=== Municipal Assembly composition ===
Party	Members
CPN (Unified Marxist–Leninist)	43
Nepali Congress	40
People's Socialist Party, Nepal	10
Rastriya Prajatantra Party	1
Independent	3
Total	97

=== Results ===
Category	Candidate	Party	Votes
Female Member	Kamala Shrestha	CPN (Unified Marxist–Leninist)	55
Female Member	Santalidevi Bishwas	CPN (Unified Marxist–Leninist)	55
Female Member	Sarita Ghimire Nepal	CPN (Unified Marxist–Leninist)	53
Female Member	Tara Kumari Raya	CPN (Unified Marxist–Leninist)	53
Female Member	Khusbu Bishwakarma	CPN (Unified Marxist–Leninist)	52
Female Member	Anju Dahal Gautam	Nepali Congress	40
Female Member	Rupa Deuja	Nepali Congress	40
Female Member	Binita Singh Thakuri	Nepali Congress	40
Female Member	Surya Devi Sah	Nepali Congress	40
Female Member	Gayatri Thapa	Nepali Congress	39
Dalit/Minority Member	Om Prakash Sah	Independent	55
Dalit/Minority Member	Sanjiv Kumar Sah	Independent	52
Dalit/Minority Member	Dipak Kumar Karna	CPN (Unified Marxist–Leninist)	52
Dalit/Minority Member	Babita Devi Sah	People's Socialist Party	45
Dalit/Minority Member	Bimala Devi Poddhar	People's Socialist Party	41
Dalit/Minority Member	Prem Rathi	Nepali Congress	40

=== Municipal Executive composition ===
Party	Members
CPN (Unified Marxist–Leninist)	16
Nepali Congress	7
People's Socialist Party, Nepal	2
Rastriya Prajatantra Party	1
Independent	3
Total	29

== See also ==
- 2022 Nepalese local elections
- 2022 Lalitpur municipal election
- 2022 Kathmandu municipal election
- 2022 Janakpur municipal election
- 2022 Pokhara municipal election
