= 2022 Nepalgunj municipal election =

Nepali municipal election

2022 Nepalgunj municipal elections
- 13 May 2022

117 seats to Nepalgunj Sub Metropolitan City Council 59 seats needed for a majority

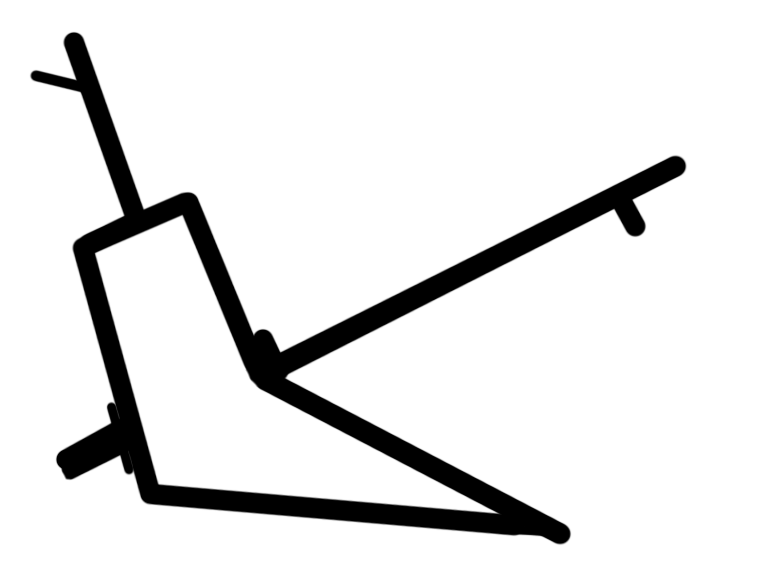

	First party	Second party	Third party
Leader	Prashant Bista
Party	Congress	PSP-Nepal	CPN (UML)
Seats before	39	13	20
Seats won	42	25	25
Seat change	▲3	▲12	▲5
Popular vote	23,460		11,675
Percentage	52.2%		26.0%
	Fourth party	Fifth party
Party	RPP	Maoist Centre
Seats before	26	19
Seats won	14	11
Seat change	▼12	▼8
Popular vote	7,598
Percentage	16.9%
- Results for ward chair by party
Mayor before election
Dhawal Shamsher Rana
Rastriya Prajatantra Party
Elected Mayor
Prashant Bista
Nepali Congress

Municipal election for Nepalgunj took place on 13 May 2022, with all 117 positions up for election across 23 wards. The electorate elected a mayor, a deputy mayor, 23 ward chairs and 92 ward members. An indirect election will also be held to elect five female members and an additional three female members from the Dalit and minority community to the municipal executive.

Prashant Bista from Nepali Congress was elected as the mayor of the sub metropolitan city.

== Background ==
Nepalgunj was established as a municipality in 1969. The sub-metropolitan city was created in 2014 by merging neighboring village development committees into Nepalgunj municipality. Electors in each ward elect a ward chair and four ward members, out of which two must be female and one of the two must belong to the Dalit community.

In the previous election previous mayor of the municipality Dhawal Shamsher Rana from Rastriya Prajatantra Party was elected as the first mayor of the sub-metropolitan city. He did not contest for re-election and instead announced his intention to run for the House of Representatives.

== Candidates ==
Party	Mayor candidate
Nepali Congress	Prashant Bista
Rastriya Prajatantra Party	
CPN (Unified Marxist–Leninist)	

== Results ==
=== Mayoral election ===
Mayoral elections result
Party	Candidate	Votes	%	±%
Congress	Prashant Bista	23,460	52.2%	+31.3%
CPN (UML)	Pashupati Dayal Mishra	11,675	26.0%	+9.4%
RPP	Nanda Lal Vaishya	7,598	16.9%	−13.0%
Others		2,191	4.9%	
Total votes		44,924	100.0%	
Congress gain from RPP		Swing	+22.15%	

Deputy mayoral elections result
Party	Candidate	Votes	%	±%
PSP-Nepal	Kamaruddin Rae	17,940	44.1%	+31.1%
CPN (UML)	Shanti Devi Dhakal	10,925	26.9%	+8.1%
RPP	Bindu Charti Magar	10,135	24.9%	+3.3%
Others		1,673	4.1%	
Total votes		40,673	100.0%	
PSP-Nepal gain from Congress		Swing	+28.55%	

=== Ward results ===
Summary of Partywise Ward chairman and Ward member seats won, 2022
Party	Chairman	Members
Nepali Congress	5	36
CPN (Unified Marxist-Leninist)	5	20
People's Socialist Party, Nepal	6	18
Rastriya Prajatantra Party	3	11
CPN (Maoist Centre)	4	7
Total	23	92

==== Results by ward ====
Position	1	2	3	4	5	6	7	8	9	10	11	12	13	14	15	16	17	18	19	20	21	22	23
Chairman																							
Female Member																							
Female Dalit Member																							
Open Member																							
Open Member																							

== Council formation ==
Party	Mayor	Deputy Mayor	Ward Chairman	Ward Members	Total seats	Remarks
Nepali Congress	1		5	36	41	Largest party
Communist Party of Nepal (UML)			5	20	25	
People's Socialist Party, Nepal		1	6	18	25	
Rastriya Prajatantra Party			3	11	14	
CPN (Maoist Centre)		1	2	4	7	
Total	1	1	23	92	117	59 for Majority

== See also ==
- 2022 Nepalese local elections
- 2022 Lalitpur municipal election
- 2022 Kathmandu municipal election
- 2022 Janakpur municipal election
- 2022 Pokhara municipal election
