= 2022 Butwal municipal election =

Local election in Nepal

2022 Butwal municipal elections
- 13 May 2022

97 seats to Butwal Sub Metropolitan City Council 49 seats needed for a majority

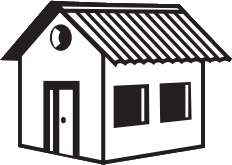
	First party	Second party	Third party
Leader	Khel Raj Pandey	Baburam Bhattarai
Party	Congress	CPN (UML)	Unified Socialist
Seats before	8	89	0
Seats won	66	28	1
Seat change	▲58	▼61	▲1
Popular vote	30,249	22,718
Percentage	52.3%	39.3%
	Fourth party	Fifth party
Party	Janamukti	Independent
Seats before	0	0
Seats won	1	1
Seat change	▲1	▲1
- Results for ward chair by party
Mayor before election
Shiva Prasad Subedi
CPN (UML)
Elected mayor
Khel Raj Pandey
Nepali Congress

Municipal election for Butwal took place on 13 May 2022, with all 97 positions up for election across 19 wards. The electorate elected a mayor, a deputy mayor, 19 ward chairs and 76 ward members. An indirect election will also be held to elect five female members and an additional three female members from the Dalit and minority community to the municipal executive.

Khel Raj Pandey from Nepali Congress was elected as mayor of the sub-metropolitan city.

== Background ==
Butwal was established in 1959 as a municipality. The sub-metropolitan city was created in 2014 by incorporating neighboring village development committees into Butwal municipality. Electors in each ward elect a ward chair and four ward members, out of which two must be female and one of the two must belong to the Dalit community.

In the previous election, Shiva Raj Subedi from CPN (Unified Marxist–Leninist) was elected as mayor.

== Candidates ==
Party	Mayor candidate
Nepali Congress	Khel Raj Pandey
Rastriya Prajatantra Party	Mrigendra Sherchan
CPN (Unified Marxist–Leninist)	Baburam Bhattarai

== Opinion Poll ==
Date	News agency	Sample size	Khel Raj Pandey	Baburam Bhattarai	Mrigendra Sherchan	Undecided	Result
10 May 2022	Setopati	80	25	21	17	17	Hung
10 May 2022	Setopati	80	31%	26%	21%	21%	Hung

== Exit polls ==
Date	Pollster	Bhattarai	Pandey	Sherchan	Others	Lead
Date	Pollster	UML	Congress	RPP	Others	Lead
13 May 2022	Facts Nepal	50.8%	38.1%	10.2%	0.8%	12.7%

== Results ==
=== Mayoral election ===
Mayoral elections result
Party	Candidate	Votes	%	±%
Congress	Khel Raj Pandey	30,249	52.3%	+6.9%
CPN (UML)	Baburam Bhattarai	22,718	39.3%	−11.3%
RPP	Mrigendra Kumar Sherchan	4,379	7.6%	+7.2%
Others		450	0.8%	
Total votes		57,796	100.0%	
Congress gain from CPN (UML)		Swing	+9.1%	

Deputy mayoral elections result
Party	Candidate	Votes	%	±%
CPN (UML)	Sabitra Devi Arya	25,061	50.8%	−8.8%
Unified Socialist	Chin Bahadur Gurung	17,023	34.5%	New
RPP	Bhagwati Pandey	6,820	13.8%	+12.5%
Others		394	0.8%	
Total votes		49,298	100.0%	
CPN (UML) hold				

=== Ward results ===
Summary of Partywise Ward chairman and Ward member seats won, 2022
Party	Chairman	Members
Nepali Congress	12	53
CPN (Unified Marxist-Leninist)	5	22
CPN (Unified Socialist)	1	0
Rastriya Janamukti Party	0	1
Independent	1	0
Total	19	76

==== Summary of Results by ward ====
Position	1	2	3	4	5	6	7	8	9	10	11	12	13	14	15	16	17	18	19
Chairman																			
Open Member																			
Open Member																			
Female Member																			
Female Dalit Member																			
Source: Election Commission

== Council formation ==
Party	Mayor	Deputy Mayor	Ward Chairman	Ward Members	Total seats	Remarks
Nepali Congress	1		12	53	66	Majority
Communist Party of Nepal (UML)		1	5	22	28	
CPN (Unified Socialist)			1	0	1	
Rastriya Janamukti Party			0	1	1	
Independent			1	0	1	
Total	1	1	19	76	97	49 for Majority

== See also ==
- 2022 Nepalese local elections
- 2022 Lalitpur municipal election
- 2022 Kathmandu municipal election
- 2022 Janakpur municipal election
- 2022 Pokhara municipal election
