= 2022 Hetauda municipal election =

Local election in Nepal

2022 Hetauda municipal elections
- 13 May 2022

97 seats to Hetauda Sub Metropolitan City Council 49 seats needed for a majority

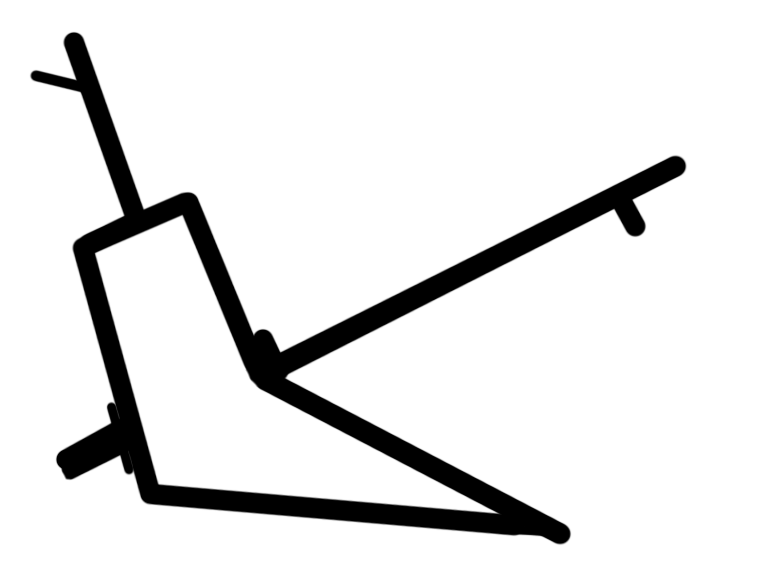

	First party	Second party	Third party
Leader	Mina Kumari Lama	Deepak Bahadur Singh	Ananta Prasad Paudel
Party	Unified Socialist	RPP	CPN (UML)
Seats before	1	1	79
Seats won	6		51
Seat change	▲5	▼1	▼28
Popular vote	23,080	20,531	20,908
Percentage	35.6%	31.7%	32.2%
Seats won		0
- Results for ward chair by party
Mayor before election
Hari Bahadur Mahat
CPN (UML)
Elected Mayor
Mina Kumari Lama
Unified Socialist

Municipal election for Hetauda took place on 13 May 2022, with all 97 positions up for election across 19 wards. The electorate elected a mayor, a deputy mayor, 19 ward chairs and 76 ward members. An indirect election will also be held to elect five female members and an additional three female members from the Dalit and minority community to the municipal executive.

Mina Kumari Lama from CPN (Unified Socialist) was elected as mayor of the sub-metropolitan city.

== Background ==
Hetauda was first established as a municipality in 1969. The sub-metropolitan was created in 2014 by incorporating neighboring village development committees into Hetauda municipality. Electors in each ward elect a ward chair and four ward members, out of which two must be female and one of the two must belong to the Dalit community.

In the previous election, Hari Bahadur Mahat from CPN (Unified Marxist–Leninist) was elected as mayor.

== Results ==
=== Mayoral election ===
Mayoral elections result
Party	Candidate	Votes	%	±%
Unified Socialist	Mina Kumari Lama	23,080	35.6%	New
CPN (UML)	Ananta Prasad Paudel	20,908	32.2%	−10.2%
RPP	Deepak Bahadur Singh	20,531	31.7%	+19.1%
Others		318	0.5%	
Total votes		64,837	100.0%	
Registered electors		104,473		
Unified Socialist gain from CPN (UML)		Swing	+22.9%	

Deputy mayoral elections result
Party	Candidate	Votes	%	±%
Congress	Rajesh Baniya	33,114	52.0%	New
CPN (UML)	Sumitra Kafle	24,328	38.2%	−8.6%
RPP	Indira Neupane	5,597	8.8%	−6.6%
Others		656	1.0%	
Total votes		63,695	100.0%	
Registered electors		104,473		
Congress gain from Unified Socialist		Swing	+30.3%	

=== Ward results ===
Summary of Partywise Ward chairman and Ward member seats won, 2022
Party	Chairman	Members
CPN (Unified Marxist-Leninist)	9	42
Nepali Congress	8	30
CPN (Unified Socialist)	1	4
CPN (Maoist Centre)	1	0
Total	19	76

==== Summary of Results by ward ====
Position	1	2	3	4	5	6	7	8	9	10	11	12	13	14	15	16	17	18	19
Chairman																			
Open Member																			
Open Member																			
Female Member																			
Female Dalit Member																			
Source: Election Commission

== See also ==
- 2022 Nepalese local elections
- 2022 Lalitpur municipal election
- 2022 Kathmandu municipal election
- 2022 Janakpur municipal election
- 2022 Pokhara municipal election
