= 2022 Itahari municipal election =

Local election in Nepal

2022 Itahari municipal elections
- 13 May 2022

102 seats to Itahari Sub Metropolitan City Council 52 seats needed for a majority

	First party	Second party
Leader	Hem Karna Paudel
Party	Nepali Congress+	CPN (UML)
Seats before	43	58
Seats won	22	75
Seat change	▼21	▲17
	Third party	Fourth party
Party	Independent	Maoist Centre
Seats before	0	1
Seats won	5	0
Seat change	▲5	▼1
- Results for ward chair by party
Mayor before election
Dwarik Lal Chaudhary
CPN (UML)
Elected Mayor
Hem Karna Paudel
Nepali Congress

Municipal election for Itahari took place on 13 May 2022, with all 102 positions up for election across 20 wards. The electorate elected a mayor, a deputy mayor, 20 ward chairs and 80 ward members. An indirect election will also be held to elect five female members and an additional three female members from the Dalit and minority community to the municipal executive.

Hem Karna Paudel from Nepali Congress was elected as the mayor of the metropolitan city defeating CPN (UML) candidate.

== Background ==
Itharai was established as a municipality in 1997. The sub-metropolitan city was created in 2014 by merging nearby village development committees into Itahari municipality. Electors in each ward elect a ward chair and four ward members, out of which two must be female and one of the two must belong to the Dalit community.

In the previous election, Dwarik Lal Chaudhary of the CPN (Unified Marxist–Leninist) was elected as the first mayor of the sub-metropolitan city.

== Candidates ==
Party	Mayor candidate
Nepali Congress	Hemkarna Paudel
CPN (Unified Marxist–Leninist)	Yam Kumar Subba
Rastriya Prajatantra Party	Akash Subba

== Opinion poll ==
Date	News agency	Sample size	Hem Karna Paudel	Yam Kumar Subba	Akash Subba	Undecided	Result
9 May 2022	Setopati	85	36	28	7	14	Hung
9 May 2022	Setopati	85	42%	33%	8.5%	16.5%	Hung

== Exit polls ==
Date	Pollster	Paudel	Y Subba	A Subba	Others	Lead
Date	Pollster	Congress	UML	RPP	Others	Lead
13 May 2022	Facts Nepal	54.3%	28.7%	7.1%	9.0%	25.6%

== Results ==
=== Mayoral election ===
Mayoral elections result
Party	Candidate	Votes	%	±%
Congress	Hem Karna Paudel	33,049	50.0%	+9.2%
CPN (UML)	Yam Kumar Chungbang Subba	28,031	42.4%	−0.8%
RPP	Aakash Hang Limbu	3,908	5.9%	−1.2%
Others		1,131	1.7%	
Total votes		66,119	100.0%	
Registered electors		104,626		
Congress gain from CPN (UML)		Swing	+5.0%	

Deputy mayoral elections result
Party	Candidate	Votes	%	±%
CPN (UML)	Sangita Kumari Chaudhary	32,436	58.0%	+12.0%
Unified Socialist	Keshav Kumar Bista	18,031	32.3%	New
RPP	Babita Kumari Chaudhary	4,719	8.4%	+0.9%
Others		717	1.3%	
Total votes		55,903	100.0%	
Registered electors		104,626		
CPN (UML) hold				

=== Ward results ===
Summary of Partywise Ward chairman and Ward member seats won, 2022
Party	Chairman	Members
Communist Party of Nepal (UML)	14	60
Nepali Congress	5	16
Independent	1	4
Total	20	80

=== Summary of results by ward ===
Position	1	2	3	4	5	6	7	8	9	10	11	12	13	14	15	16	17	18	19	20
Ward Chairman																				
Ward Member 1																				
Ward Member 2																				
Female Member																				
Female Dalit Member																				
Source: Election Commission

== Council formation ==
Party	Mayor	Deputy Mayor	Ward Chairman	Ward Members	Total seats	Remarks
Nepali Congress	1		5	16	22	
Communist Party of Nepal (UML)		1	14	60	75	Majority
Independent			1	4	5	
Total	1	1	20	80	102	52 for Majority

== See also ==
- 2022 Nepalese local elections
- 2022 Lalitpur municipal election
- 2022 Kathmandu municipal election
- 2022 Janakpur municipal election
- 2022 Pokhara municipal election
