= 2022 Kalaiya municipal election =

Local election in Nepal

2022 Kalaiya municipal elections
- 13 May 2022

137 seats to Kalaiya Sub Metropolitan City Council 69 seats needed for a majority

	First party	Second party	Third party
Leader	Binod Prasad Shah	Rajesh Rae Yadav
Party	CPN (UML)	Congress	PSP-Nepal
Seats before	43	40	28
Seats won	57	43	28
Seat change	▲14	▲3	Steady
Popular vote	24,174	18,540
Percentage	54.1%	41.5%
	Fourth party	Fifth party	Sixth party
Leader			Jay Prakash Shah Teli
Party	Nepal Loktantrik Party	Unified Socialist	Loktantrik Samajwadi
Seats before	4		9
Seats won	5	4	0
Seat change	▲1	▲4	▼9
Popular vote			910
Percentage			2.0%
Mayor before election
Rajesh Rae Yadav
Congress
Elected Mayor
Binod Prasad Shah
CPN (UML)

Municipal election for Kalaiya took place on 13 May 2022, with all 137 positions up for election across 27 wards. The electorate elected a mayor, a deputy mayor, 27 ward chairs and 108 ward members. An indirect election will also be held to elect five female members and an additional three female members from the Dalit and minority community to the municipal executive.

Binod Prasad Shah from CPN (Unified Marxist–Leninist) was elected as mayor but no party was able to gain a majority in the council.

== Background ==
Kalaiya was established in 1982 as a municipality. The sub-metropolitan city was created in 2017 by merging neighboring village development committees into Kalaiya. Electors in each ward elect a ward chair and four ward members, out of which two must be female and one of the two must belong to the Dalit community.

In the previous election, Rajesh Rae Yadav from Nepali Congress was elected as the first mayor of the sub-metropolitan city.

== Candidates ==
Party	Mayor candidate
Nepali Congress	Rajesh Raya Yadav
CPN (Unified Marxist–Leninist)	

== Results ==
=== Mayoral election ===
Mayoral elections result
Party	Candidate	Votes	%	±%
CPN (UML)	Binod Prasad Shah	24,174	54.1%	+27.8%
Congress	Rajesh Rae Yadav	18,540	41.5%	+11.5%
Others		1,944	4.4%	
Total votes		44,659	100.0%	
CPN (UML) gain from Congress		Swing	+8.2%	

Deputy mayoral elections result
Party	Candidate	Votes	%	±%
CPN (UML)	Roshan Parbin	19,251	47.8%	+22.1%
PSP-Nepal	Pramod Prasad Gupta	18,304	45.4%	+23.8%
Others		2,721	6.8%	
Total votes		40,276	100.0%	
CPN (UML) gain from Congress		Swing	+25.7%	

=== Ward results ===
Summary of Partywise Ward chairman and Ward member seats won, 2022
Party	Chairman	Members
Nepali Congress	10	33
CPN (Unified Marxist-Leninist)	9	46
People's Socialist Party, Nepal	6	22
Nepal Loktantrik Party	1	4
CPN (Unified Socialist)	1	3
Total	27	108

=== Summary of results by ward ===
Position	1	2	3	4	5	6	7	8	9	10	11	12	13	14	15	16	17	18	19	20	21	22	23	24	25	26	27
Ward Chairman																											
Ward Member 1																											
Ward Member 2																											
Female Member																											
Female Dalit Member																											
Source: Election Commission

== See also ==
- 2022 Nepalese local elections
- 2022 Lalitpur municipal election
- 2022 Kathmandu municipal election
- 2022 Janakpur municipal election
- 2022 Pokhara municipal election
- 2022 Provincial Assembly of Madhesh Province election
