= 2022 Ghorahi municipal election =

Nepalese local elections

2022 Ghorahi municipal elections
- 13 May 2022

97 seats to Ghorahi Sub Metropolitan City Council 49 seats needed for a majority

	First party	Second party	Third party
Leader	Naru Lal Chaudhary		Hemraj Sharma
Party	CPN (UML)	Congress	Maoist Centre
Seats before	55	29	14
Seats won	67	23	7
Seat change	▲12	▼5	▼7
Popular vote	31,728		26,368
Percentage	48.2%		40.0%
- Results for ward chair by party
Mayor before election
Naru Lal Chaudhary
UML
Elected Mayor
Naru Lal Chaudhary
UML

Municipal election for Ghorahi took place on 13 May 2022, with all 97 positions up for election across 19 wards. The electorate elected a mayor, a deputy mayor, 19 ward chairs and 76 ward members. An indirect election will also be held to elect five female members and an additional three female members from the Dalit and minority community to the municipal executive.

Incumbent Naru Lal Chaudhary from CPN (Unified Marxist–Leninist) was re-elected as mayor.

== Background ==
Ghorahi was established as a municipality in 1979. The sub-metropolitan city was created in 2017 by merging neighboring Tripur municipality and other village development committees into Ghorahi municipality. The Electors in each ward elect a ward chair and four ward members, out of which two must be female and one of the two must belong to the Dalit community.

In the previous election, Naru Lal Chaudhary of the CPN (Unified Marxist–Leninist) was elected as the first mayor of the sub-metropolitan city.

== Candidates ==
Party	Mayor candidate	Deputy Mayor candidate
Nepali Congress		Bhup Bahadur Dangi
CPN (Maoist Centre)	Hemraj Sharma	
CPN (Unified Marxist–Leninist)	Narulal Chaudhary	Mankuamri DC

== Results ==
=== Mayoral election ===
Mayoral elections result
Party	Candidate	Votes	%	±%
CPN (UML)	Naru Lal Chaudhary	31,728	48.2%	+7.4%
Maoist Centre	Hemraj Sharma	26,368	40.0%	+17.6%
RPP	Sarita Devkota	5,324	8.1%	+6.0%
Unified Socialist	Ram Prasad Chaudhary	1,143	1.7%	New
Others		1,275	1.9%	
Total votes		65,838	100.0%	
CPN (UML) hold				

Deputy mayoral elections result
Party	Candidate	Votes	%	±%
CPN (UML)	Huma Kumari DC	30,403	45.9%	+7.5%
Congress	Bhup Bahadur Dangi	30,345	45.8%	+13.3%
RPP	Bibhu Budhathoki	3,521	5.3%	+3.9%
Unified Socialist	Shobha Kumari Shahi	1,158	1.7%	New
Others		768	1.2%	
Total votes		66,195	100.0%	
CPN (UML) hold				

=== Ward results ===
Summary of Partywise Ward chairman and Ward member seats won, 2022
Party	Chairman	Members
CPN (Unified Marxist-Leninist)	13	52
Nepali Congress	5	18
CPN (Maoist Centre)	1	6
Total	19	76

==== Results by ward ====
Position	1	2	3	4	5	6	7	8	9	10	11	12	13	14	15	16	17	18	19
Ward Chair																			
Open Member																			
Open Member																			
Female Member																			
Female Dalit Member																			

== See also ==
- 2022 Nepalese local elections
- 2022 Kathmandu municipal election
- 2022 Tulsipur municipal election
- 2022 Janakpur municipal election
