= 2022 Tulsipur municipal election =

Local election in Nepal

2022 Tulsipur municipal elections
- 13 May 2022

97 seats to Tulsipur Sub Metropolitan City Council 49 seats needed for a majority
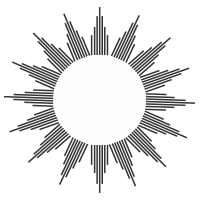

	First party	Second party
Leader	Tika Ram Khadka	Gehendra Giri
Party	CPN (UML)	Congress
Seats before	53	44
Seats won	67	23
Seat change	▲14	▼21
Popular vote	31,408	27,717
Percentage	50.0%	44.1%
	Third party	Fourth party
Party	Maoist Centre	Independent
Seats before	0	0
Seats won	6	1
Seat change	▲6	▲1
- Results for ward chair by party
Mayor before election
Ghanshyam Pandey
CPN (UML)
Elected Mayor
Tika Ram Khadka
CPN (UML)

Municipal election for Tulsipur took place on 13 May 2022, with all 97 positions up for election across 19 wards. The electorate elected a mayor, a deputy mayor, 19 ward chairs and 76 ward members. An indirect election will also be held to elect five female members and an additional three female members from the Dalit and minority community to the municipal executive.

== Background ==
Tulsipur was established in 1992 as a municipality. The sub-metropolitan city was formed in 2017 by incorporating neighboring village development committees into Tulsipur municipality. Electors in each ward elect a ward chair and four ward members, out of which two must be female and one of the two must belong to the Dalit community.

In the previous election, Ghanshyam Pandey from CPN (Unified Marxist–Leninist) was elected as the first mayor of the sub-metropolitan city.

== Candidates ==
Party	Mayor candidate
Nepali Congress	Gehendra Giri
CPN (Unified Marxist–Leninist)	

== Results ==
=== Mayoral election ===
Mayoral elections result
Party	Candidate	Votes	%	±%
CPN (UML)	Tika Ram Khadka	31,408	50.0%	+6.2%
Congress	Gehendra Giri	27,717	44.1%	+7.8%
Nepal Loktantrik Party	Ghanashyam Chaudhary	1,361	2.2%	New
RPP	Jagdhani Chaudhary	1,221	1.9%	+1.0%
Others		1,139	1.8%	
Total votes		62,846	100.0%	
CPN (UML) hold				

Deputy mayoral elections result
Party	Candidate	Votes	%	±%
CPN (UML)	Syani Chaudhary	30,597	53.3%	+12.8%
Unified Socialist	Jog Bahadur Rana Magar	21,065	36.7%	New
RPP	Prem Bahadur Shah	2,377	4.1%	+3.0%
Independent	Khemraj Oli	2,237	3.9%	New
Others		1,095	1.9%	
Total votes		57,371	100.0%	
CPN (UML) hold				

=== Ward results ===
Summary of Partywise Ward chairman and Ward member seats won, 2022
Party	Chairman	Members
CPN (Unified Marxist-Leninist)	10	55
Nepali Congress	5	18
CPN (Maoist Centre)	3	3
Independent	1	0
Total	19	76

==== Summary of Results by ward ====
Position	1	2	3	4	5	6	7	8	9	10	11	12	13	14	15	16	17	18	19
Chairman																			
Open Member																			
Open Member																			
Female Member																			
Female Dalit Member																			
Source: Election Commission

== See also ==
- 2022 Nepalese local elections
- 2022 Lalitpur municipal election
- 2022 Kathmandu municipal election
- 2022 Janakpur municipal election
- 2022 Pokhara municipal election
