= 2022 Nepalese local elections =

Nepalese local elections

- 13 May 2022

6 Metropolitan Cities 11 Sub-Metropolitan Cities 276 Municipalities 460 Rural Municipalities
- Registered: 17,733,723
- Turnout: 70.96% (▼3.20pp)
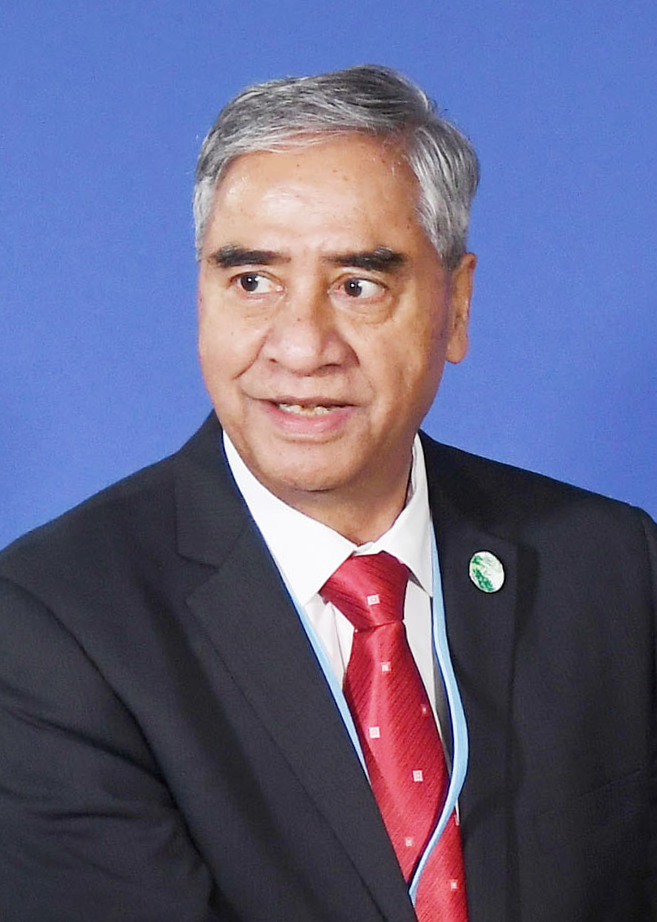

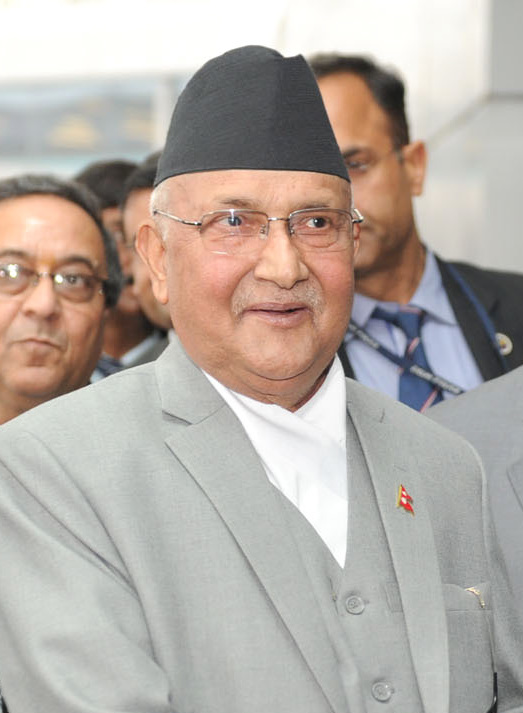

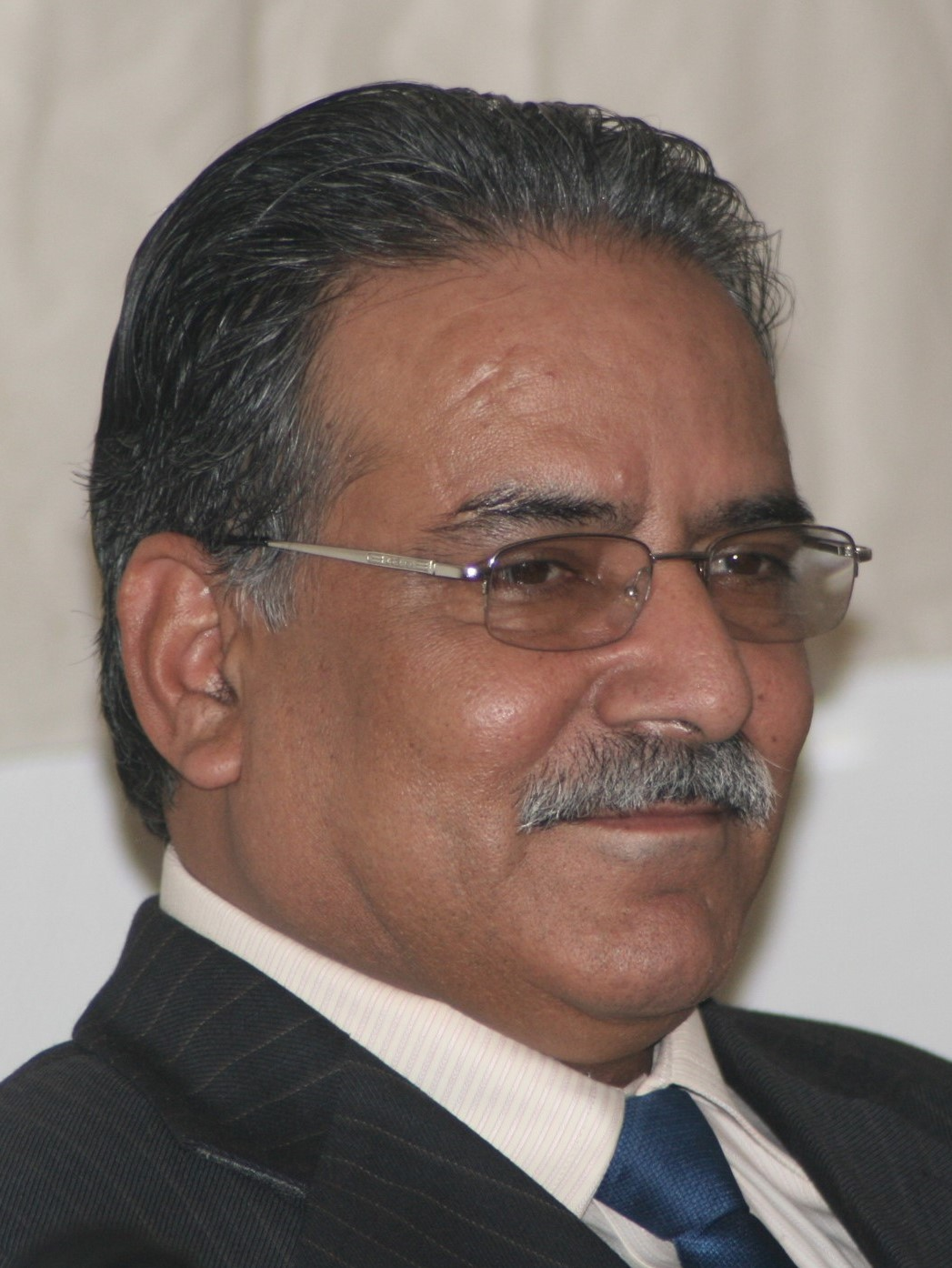

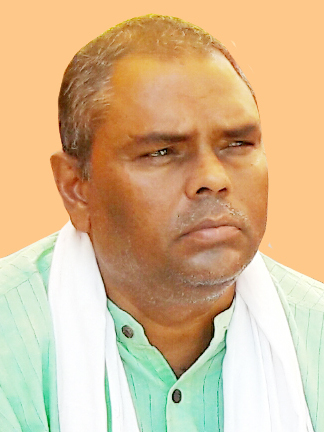

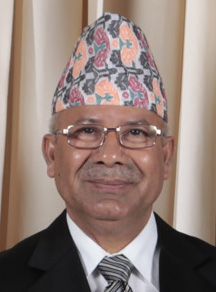

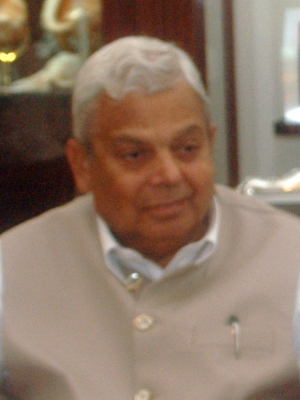
	First party	Second party	Third party
Leader	Sher Bahadur Deuba	KP Sharma Oli	Pushpa Kamal Dahal
Party	Congress	CPN (UML)	Maoist Centre
Leader since	7 March 2016	8 March 2021	8 March 2021
Heads	329	206	121
Heads +/–	▲54	▼65	▲15
Ward chairs	2,658	2,132	1,053
Ward chairs +/–	▲284	▼428	▼49
Popular Vote	3,956,193	3,811,602	1,503,247
	Fourth party	Fifth party	Sixth party
Leader	Upendra Yadav	Madhav Kumar Nepal	Mahantha Thakur
Party	PSP-Nepal	Unified Socialist	Loktantrik Samajwadi
Leader since	May 2020	18 August 2021	18 August 2021
Heads	30	20	16
Heads +/–	▼13	▲1	▼2
Ward chairs	295	190	103
Ward chairs +/–	▲11	▲190	▼92
Popular Vote	577,380	422,737	255,882
	Seventh party	Eighth party	Ninth party
Leader	Rajendra Lingden	Chitra Bahadur K.C.	Ranjita Shrestha
Party	RPP	Janamorcha	Nagrik Unmukti
Leader since	5 December 2021	26 May 2006	3 January 2022
Heads	4	4	4
Heads +/–	▼1	▲1	▲4
Ward chairs	62	26	14
Ward chairs +/–	▲1	▼7	▲14
Popular Vote	363,160	40,491	31,039

The 2022 Nepalese local elections were held on 13 May 2022 in 6 metropolitan cities, 11 sub-metropolitan cities, 276 municipalities and 460 rural municipalities. These were the second set of local-level elections to be held since the promulgation of the new constitution in 2015. From the local election result Nepali Congress has become the single largest party of Nepal followed by CPN (UML) and Maoist Centre.

== Electoral system ==
Each local body has an elected head, a chair for rural municipalities and a mayor for municipalities. They also have a deputy head, a deputy chair for rural municipalities and a deputy mayor for municipalities. Local levels are further subdivided into wards which have a ward chairperson and four members out of which two must be female with one of them from the Dalit community. The Chairperson/Mayor and a Deputy chairperson/Deputy Mayor are chosen by voters of the entire local level while Ward Chairperson and Ward Members are chosen by voters of the concerned ward. A single ballot is used for voting and First past the post electoral system is used to select the winner.

Local Level Type	Choice
Metropolitan City	Mayor, Deputy Mayor, Ward Chairperson, 4 Ward members per ward
Sub-Metropolitan City	Mayor, Deputy Mayor, Ward Chairperson, 4 Ward members per ward
Municipality	Mayor, Deputy Mayor, Ward Chairperson, 4 Ward members per ward
Rural Municipality	Chairperson, deputy chairperson, Ward Chairperson, 4 Ward members per ward

=== Qualification for candidates ===
According to Part 17 of the Constitution, a person who meets the following criteria is qualified to become a candidate for various elected offices of the local level:

- citizen of Nepal,
- completed the age of twenty one years,
- registered voters of concerned local level, (Note: Candidates for ward chairperson and ward members must be registered in the concerned ward) and
- not being disqualified by any Federal law,

Date	Pollster	Party	Mayor and Chairperson	Deputy mayor and Deputy chairperson	Ward chairman	Increase or Decrease
10 May 2022	Setopati	Congress	295-317	288-309	2462-2607	▲
10 May 2022	Setopati	UML	235-253	241-264	2085-2299	▼
10 May 2022	Setopati	Maoist Centre	76-105	72-99	970-1130	▲
10 May 2022	Setopati	CPN (US)	35-43	39-47	290-370	▲
10 May 2022	Setopati	PSP-N	24-32	23-29	200-245	▼
10 May 2022	Setopati	RPP	13-22	11-15	82-104	▲
10 May 2022	Setopati	LSP-N	12-17	14-19	89-119	▼
10 May 2022	Setopati	Ind	6-9	1-5	92-118	▲
10 May 2022	Setopati	RJM	2-4	2-3	31-46	▲
10 May 2022	Setopati	NMKP	1-2	1-2	18-23	-/▲
10 May 2022	Setopati	Janamat	2-5	1-3	14-20	▲
10 May 2022	Setopati	PPP	0-3	0-2	12-21	▲
10 May 2022	Setopati	PFP	0-2	0-1	9-16	▲
10 May 2022	Setopati	Others	0-2	0-1	31-47	-
Total			753	753	6742	

=== Exit poll ===
==== Mayor/Chairperson post ====
Date	Pollster	Party	Province 1	Madhesh province	Bagmati province	Gandaki province	Lumbini province	Karnali province	Sudurpaschim province	Total
13 May 2022	ABC Television	Congress	60-70	45-50	40-44	46-50	38-42	20-23	42-47	292-326
13 May 2022	ABC Television	UML	36-40	23-24	43-50	23-25	29-30	13-16	18-23	185-209
13 May 2022	ABC Television	Maoist Centre	15-16	16-18	18-20	5-8	20-25	27-33	17-20	118-142
13 May 2022	ABC Television	PSP-N	2-4	27-34	-	2-3	9-15	-	1-2	41-59
13 May 2022	ABC Television	CPN (US)	1-2	2-4	2-3	-	1-2	5-7	2-4	13-23
13 May 2022	ABC Television	LSP-N	1-2	8-12	-	-	1-2	-	1-2	11-18
13 May 2022	ABC Television	RJM	-	-	-	2	3	-	-	5
13 May 2022	ABC Television	RPP	2-3	0-1	1-2	-	0-1	-	0-1	3-8
13 May 2022	ABC Television	Others/Independent	-	1-2	1-2	-	1-2	1-2	1-2	6-10
13 May 2022	ABC Television	High competition	20	15	14	7	6	13	6	81
Total			137	136	119	85	109	78	88	753

== Results ==
=== Overall Results ===
Parties	Mayor/Chair	Deputy mayor/chair	Ward chair	Ward members	Total
Nepali Congress	329	300	2,668	10,476	13,773
CPN (Unified Marxist–Leninist)	206	241	2,137	9,345	11,929
CPN (Maoist Centre)	121	128	1,053	3,743	5,045
People's Socialist Party, Nepal	30	31	295	1,193	1,548
CPN (Unified Socialist)	20	23	190	754	987
Loktantrik Samajwadi Party, Nepal	16	12	103	450	581
Rastriya Prajatantra Party	4	4	62	235	305
Rastriya Janamorcha	4	3	26	126	159
Nagrik Unmukti Party	4	3	14	78	99
Janamat Party	2	1	19	74	96
Nepal Workers Peasants Party	1	1	19	64	85
People's Progressive Party	1	1	4	16	22
Bibeksheel Sajha Party	1	1	2	7	11
Terai Madhesh Loktantrik Party	1	0	3	8	12
Nepal Janata Party	0	0	2	8	10
Sanghiya Loktantrik Rastriya Manch	0	0	2	7	9
Nepali Congress (B.P.)	0	0	2	5	7
Nepal Loktantrik Party	0	0	1	6	7
Rastriya Janamukti Party	0	0	1	6	7
Bahujan Shakti Party	0	0	1	5	6
Bahujan Ekata Party Nepal	0	0	1	4	5
Nepal Susashan Party	0	0	1	3	4
CPN Maoist Socialist	0	0	0	2	2
Nepal Sadbhawana Party	0	0	0	1	1
Independents	13	4	137	232	385
Total	753	753	6,743	26,848	35,097
Source: Election Commission of Nepal

=== By province ===
==== Province 1 ====
Parties	Mayor/Chairperson	Deputy mayor/chairperson	Ward chair	Ward members	Total
Nepali Congress	69	46	470	1,761	2,346
CPN (Unified Marxist–Leninist)	47	63	476	2,200	2,786
CPN (Maoist Centre)	12	19	127	401	559
CPN (Unified Socialist)	2	5	20	75	102
People's Socialist Party, Nepal	2	2	20	88	112
Rastriya Prajatantra Party	2	2	14	43	61
Sanghiya Loktantrik Rastriya Manch	0	0	2	7	9
Loktantrik Samajwadi Party, Nepal	0	0	1	4	5
Rastriya Janamukti Party	0	0	1	4	5
Independents	3	0	26	39	68
Total	137	137	1,157	4,622	6,053
Source: Election Commission of Nepal

==== Madhesh Province ====
Party	Mayor/Chairperson	Deputy mayor/chairperson	Ward chair	Ward members	Total
Nepali Congress	46	56	418	1,676	2,196
CPN (Unified Marxist–Leninist)	30	27	274	1,136	1,467
People's Socialist Party, Nepal	25	26	226	931	1,208
Loktantrik Samajwadi Party, Nepal	14	10	87	372	483
CPN (Maoist Centre)	9	9	139	523	680
CPN (Unified Socialist)	6	5	80	310	401
Janamat Party	2	1	13	46	62
Bibeksheel Sajha Party	1	1	2	7	11
Terai Madhesh Loktantrik Party	1	0	3	8	12
Rastriya Prajatantra Party	0	0	6	24	30
Bahujan Ekata Party Nepal	0	0	1	4	5
Nepal Loktantrik Party	0	0	1	4	5
Nepal Janata Party	0	0	1	4	5
Nepal Susashan Party	0	0	1	3	4
Bahujan Shakti Party	0	0	0	1	1
Nepal Sadbhwana Party	0	0	0	1	1
Independents	2	1	19	28	50
Total	136	136	1,271	5,078	6,621
Source: Election Commission of Nepal

==== Bagmati Province ====
Parties	Mayor/Chairperson	Deputy mayor/chairperson	Ward chair	Ward members	Total
Nepali Congress	58	50	488	1,914	2,510
CPN (Maoist Centre)	27	30	204	707	968
CPN (Unified Marxist–Leninist)	26	34	359	1,636	2,055
CPN (Unified Socialist)	5	4	25	83	117
Nepal Majdoor Kisan Party	1	1	12	40	54
Rastriya Prajatantra Party	1	0	14	47	62
People's Socialist Party, Nepal	0	0	1	2	3
Independents	1	0	18	18	37
Total	119	119	1,121	4,447	5,806
Source: Election Commission of Nepal

==== Gandaki Province ====
Party	Mayor/Chairperson	Deputy mayor/chairperson	Ward chair	Ward members	Total
Nepali Congress	36	31	351	1,306	1,724
CPN (Unified Marxist–Leninist)	35	33	284	1,279	1,631
CPN (Maoist Centre)	11	19	89	303	422
Rastriya Janamorcha	2	1	10	46	59
CPN (Unified Socialist)	1	0	3	16	20
People's Socialist Party, Nepal	0	0	3	12	15
Rastriya Prajatantra Party	0	0	1	10	11
Rastriya Janamukti Party	0	0	0	1	1
Independents	0	1	18	35	54
Total	85	85	759	3,008	3,937
Source: Election Commission of Nepal

==== Lumbini Province ====
Parties	Mayor/Chairperson	Deputy mayor/chairperson	Ward chair	Ward members	Total
Nepali Congress	48	44	375	1,516	1,983
CPN (Unified Marxist–Leninist)	27	40	314	1,315	1,696
CPN (Maoist Centre)	25	15	170	621	831
People's Socialist Party, Nepal	3	3	43	153	202
Rastriya Janamorcha	2	2	16	80	100
Loktantrik Samajwadi Party, Nepal	2	2	15	74	93
Rastriya Prajatantra Party	1	2	21	84	108
People's Progressive Party, Nepal	1	1	4	16	22
Janamat Party	0	0	6	28	34
CPN (Unified Socialist)	0	0	4	12	16
Bahujan Shakti Party	0	0	1	4	5
Nepal Janata Party	0	0	1	4	5
Rastriya Janamukti Party	0	0	0	1	1
Independents	0	0	13	24	37
Total	109	109	983	3,932	5,133
Source: Election Commission of Nepal

==== Karnali Province ====
Party	Mayor/Chairperson	Deputy mayor/chairperson	Ward chair	Ward members	Total
Nepali Congress	32	27	253	944	1,256
CPN (Maoist Centre)	23	25	223	855	1,126
CPN (Unified Marxist–Leninist)	15	20	184	818	1,037
CPN (Unified Socialist)	4	6	30	140	180
Nepal Majdoor Kisan Party	0	0	7	24	31
Rastriya Prajatantra Party	0	0	1	10	11
CPN Maoist Socialist	0	0	0	2	2
Independents	5	1	20	42	68
Total	79	79	718	2,835	3,711
Source: Election Commission of Nepal

==== Sudurpaschim Province ====
Parties	Mayor/Chairperson	Deputy mayor/chairperson	Ward chair	Ward members	Total
Nepali Congress	40	46	313	1,359	1,758
CPN (Unified Marxist–Leninist)	26	24	246	961	1,257
CPN (Maoist Centre)	14	11	101	333	459
Nagrik Unmukti Party	4	3	14	78	99
CPN (Unified Socialist)	2	3	28	118	151
Rastriya Prajatantra Party	0	0	5	17	22
People's Socialist Party, Nepal	0	0	2	7	9
Nepali Congress (B.P.)	0	0	2	5	7
Nepal Loktantrik Party	0	0	0	2	2
Independents	2	1	23	46	72
Total	88	88	734	2,926	3,836
Source: Election Commission of Nepal

=== Major cities ===
==== Metropolitan cities ====
City	District	Province	Outgoing mayor	Elected mayor	Details
Biratnagar	Morang	Province No. 1	Bheem Parajuli (Congress)	Naagesh Koirala (Congress)	Details
Birgunj	Parsa	Madhesh	Vijaya Kumar Sarawagi (FSFN)	Rajesh Man Singh (PSPN)	Details
Lalitpur	Lalitpur	Bagmati	Chiri Babu Maharjan (Congress)	Chiri Babu Maharjan (Congress)	Details
Bharatpur	Chitwan	Bagmati	Renu Dahal (Maoist Centre)	Renu Dahal (Maoist Centre)	Details
Kathmandu	Kathmandu	Bagmati	Bidya Sundar Shakya (UML)	Balendra Shah (Independent)	Details
Pokhara	Kaski	Gandaki	Man Bahadur GC (UML)	Dhanraj Acharya (Socialist)	Details

==== Sub-metropolitan cities ====
City	District	Province	Outgoing mayor	Elected mayor	Details
Dharan	Sunsari	Province No. 1	Tilak Rai (Congress)	Harka Raj Rai (Independent)	Details
Itahari	Sunsari	Province No. 1	Dwarika Lal Chaudhary (UML)	Hem Karna Paudel (Congress)	Details
Janakpur	Dhanusha	Madhesh	Lal Kishor Sah (RJPN)	Manoj Kumar Sah (Independent)	Details
Kalaiya	Bara	Madhesh	Rajesh Raya Yadav (Congress)	Binod Prasad Shah (UML)	Details
Jitpursimara	Bara	Madhesh	Krishna Prasad Paudel (UML)	Rajan Paudel (Maoist Centre)	Details
Hetauda	Makwanpur	Bagmati	Hari Bahadur Mahat (UML)	Mina Kumari Lama (Socialist)	Details
Butwal	Rupandehi	Lumbini	Shiva Raj Subedi (UML)	Khel Raj Panday (Congress)	Details
Tulsipur	Dang	Lumbini	Ghana Shyam Pandey (UML)	Tika Ram Adhikari (UML)	Details
Ghorahi	Dang	Lumbini	Naru Lal Chaudhary (UML)	Naru Lal Chaudhary (UML)	Details
Nepalgunj	Banke	Lumbini	Dhawal Shamsher Rana (RPP)	Prashant Bista (Congress)	Details
Dhangadhi	Kailali	Sudurpashchim	Nrip Bahadur Wad (Congress)	Gopal Hamal (Independent)	Details

== Incidents ==
The Election Commission of Nepal sought clarification from CPN (Maoist Centre) chairman Pushpa Kamal Dahal and the wife of prime minister Sher Bahadur Deuba, Arzu Rana Deuba for violating the code of conduct during their election rally.

The chairman of the Muslim Commission Samim Miya Ansari was caught in Janakpurdham during the silence period of election campaigning for trying to buy votes for independent candidate Janakiram Sah and Surendra Bhandari, the chair of the Janakpur committee of CPN (Unified Marxist–Leninist) was also arrested for trying to buy votes. Ansari later accused UML leaders Raghubir Mahasheth and Julie Kumari Mahato of framing him.

During election day, the commission fined former prime minister Baburam Bhattarai NPR 15,000 for breaking the code of conduct by tweeting a picture of his ballot paper. In Vyas municipality in Tanahun, independent candidate, Deepak Raj Joshi, son of former Nepali Congress leader Govinda Raj Joshi, sustained injuries to the head after being beaten up by cadres of Nepali Congress. After clashes broke out between cadres of People's Socialist Party, Nepali Congress and CPN (UML) in Yamunamai Rural Municipality in Rautahat, a former police constable ran away with the ballot box in the ensuing chaos and voting was suspended. He was later arrested.

According to the National Human Rights Commission voting was suspended in different parts of the country due to clashes between supporters of different political parties. The Election Commission of Nepal reported that voting was suspended in 79 polling centres on May 13.

After accusations of booth capturing by CPN (Unified Marxist–Leninist) in Budhiganga Rural Municipality in Bajura, Nepali Congress demanded that a re-election be held. The Election Commission later agreed with the demands and a re-election was held on 7 July.

== See also ==
- List of chairpersons of rural municipalities in Nepal
- List of mayors of municipalities in Nepal
- Elections in Nepal
