= Mayor of Pokhara =

Executive head of Pokhara Metropolitan City

Mayor of Pokhara Metropolitan City
- पोखरा महानगरपालिकाका नगर प्रमुख
- Incumbent; Dhana Raj Acharya since 27 May 2022
- Style: No courtesy or style ascribed
- Type: Executive Head
- Seat: Office of Municipal Executive, Pokhara
- Appointer: Electorate of Pokhara
- Term length: Five years, renewable once
- Constituting instrument: Constitution of Nepal
- Inaugural holder: Shiva Bahadur Thapa
- Formation: 1959
- Deputy: Deputy Mayor of Pokhara Metropolitan City
- Salary: रु 43,000
- Website: pokharamun.gov.np

The mayor of Pokhara is the head of the municipal executive of Pokhara Metropolitan City. The role was first created in 1959.

The current mayor is Dhana Raj Acharya who was elected in the 2022 election. The position has been held by sixteen people since its creation.

The city of Pokhara is governed by the Pokhara Metropolitan City Council and the mayor is supported by the municipal executive which consists of the deputy mayor and ward chairs of all 33 wards of Pokhara.

== Power and functions ==
The mayor is elected by the residents of Pokhara Metropolitan City for a five-year period that is renewable only once. The municipal executive is formed under the chairmanship of the mayor. Local government in Nepal has authority over the local units pursuant to Schedule 8 of the Constitution of Nepal. The mayor derives its power from the Local Government Operation Act, 2017.

The main functions of the mayor are:

- Summon and chair meetings of the municipal assembly and the municipal executive.
- Table agendas and proposals to the municipal assembly and the municipal executive.
- Prepare and present the annual programmes and budget.
- Enforce the decisions of the assembly and the executive.
- Oversee the work of committees and sub-committees of the municipality and ward committees.

The mayor of Pokhara is also a member of the Kaski District Assembly and the senate of Pokhara University.

== Elections ==
The mayor is elected though first-past-the-post voting for a period of five-years. In order to qualify as a candidate for mayor, the person must be a citizen of Nepal, must be over the age of twenty-one years, must be a voter who is registered in the electoral roll of Pokhara Metropolitan City and must not be disqualified by law.

== List of mayors ==
=== Transition period (1959–60) ===
#	Mayor	Term of office	
1	Shiva Bahadur Thapa	1959	1960

=== Panchayat era (1960–1988) ===
#	Pradhan Pancha	Term of office	
2	Nagendra Bahadur Rayamajhi	1960	1966
3	Ambar Bahadur Karki	1966	1971
4	Rudra Bahadur Karki	1971	1974
5	Dilip Kumar Palikhe	1974	1975
6	Ramesh Bahadur Bhattarai	1975	1976
7	Ganesh Sherchan	1976	1981
8	Shree Prasad Gurung	1981	1982
9	Uttam Bahadur Pun	1982	1984
10	Surya Bahadur K.C.	1984	1988

=== Constitutional monarchy era (1992–2007) ===
#	Mayor	Term of office		Political party
11	Bhola Thapa	1992	1997	Nepali Congress
12	Krishna Bahadur Thapa	1997	2001	CPN (Unified Marxist–Leninist)
13	Harka Bahadur Gurung	2003	2004	Appointed by King Gyandendra
14	Bhimsen Thapa	2004	2007	Appointed by King Gyandendra

=== Federal Democratic Republic of Nepal (2017–22) ===
#	Mayor	Term of office		Elected	Political party
15	Man Bahadur G.C.	May 29, 2017	May 19, 2022	2017	CPN (Unified Marxist–Leninist)
16	Dhana Raj Acharya	May 27, 2022	present	2022	CPN (Unified Socialist)

== See also ==
- Pokhara
- Mayor of Kathmandu
- Local government in Nepal
- List of mayors of municipalities in Nepal
