= 2022 Jitpursimara municipal election =

Local election in Nepal

2022 Jitpursimara mayoral election
- 13 May 2022

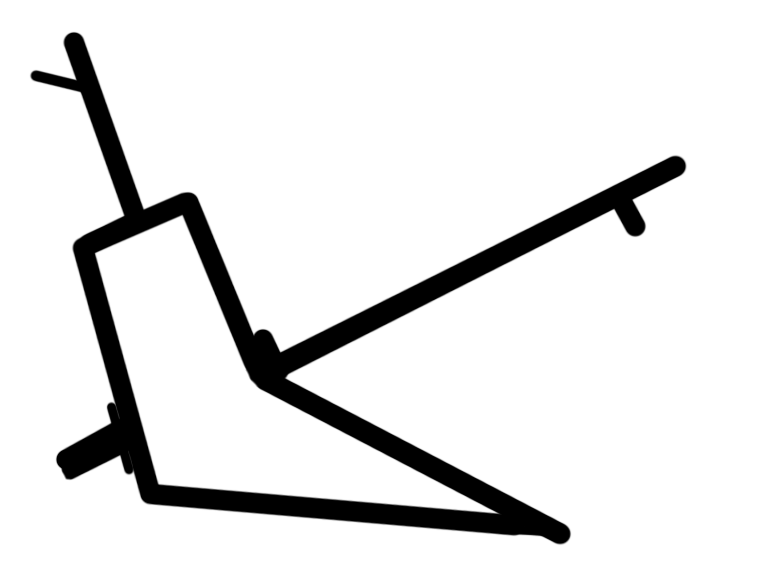
	First party	Second party
Candidate	Rajan Paudel	Saraswati Devi Chaudhary
Party	Maoist Centre	CPN (UML)
Popular vote	18,743	17,779
Percentage	43.4%	41.1%
	Third party	Fourth party
Candidate	Sanjay Kumar Sah	Madhav Prasad Tripathi
Party	Loktantrik Samajwadi	RPP
Popular vote	5,382	1,302
Percentage	12.5%	3.0%
Mayor before election
Krishna Prasad Paudel
CPN (UML)
Elected Mayor
Rajan Paudel
Maoist Centre

Municipal election for Jitpursimara took place on 13 May 2022, with all 122 positions up for election across 24 wards. The electorate elected a mayor, a deputy mayor, 24 ward chairs and 96 ward members. An indirect election will also be held to elect five female members and an additional three female members from the Dalit and minority community to the municipal executive.

Rajan Paudel of the CPN (Maoist Centre) was elected as the mayor of sub-metropolitan city.

== Background ==
The first municipal election for the council was held in 2017 after the council was created by incorporating neighboring village development committees into the former Gadhimai municipality by the Local Reconstruction Body Commission. Electors in each ward elect a ward chair and four ward members, out of which two must be female and one of the two must belong to the Dalit community.

In the previous election, Krishna Prasad Paudel from the CPN (Unified Marxist–Leninist) was elected as the first mayor of the sub-metropolitan city.

== Candidates ==
Krishna Prasad Paudel did not seek re-election and the incumbent deputy mayor, Saraswati Devi Chaudhary, instead served as the candidate for CPN (Unified Marxist–Leninist).

In accordance with the decision of central leaders of Nepali Congress, CPN (Maoist Centre), People's Socialist Party, CPN (Unified Socialist) and Rastriya Janamorcha, an alliance was created to contest local elections in some local units. In Jitpursimara, CPN (Maoist Centre) fielded the candidate for mayor and Nepali Congress fielded the candidate for the deputy mayor from the five-party alliance.

== Results ==
=== Mayoral election ===
Mayoral elections result
Party	Candidate	Votes	%	±%
Maoist Centre	Rajan Paudel	18,743	43.4%	
CPN (UML)	Saraswati Devi Chaudhary	17,779	41.1%	
Loktantrik Samajwadi	Sanjay Kumar Sah	5,382	12.5%	
RPP	Madhav Prasad Tripathi	1,302	3.0%	
Others		7	0.02%	
Total votes		43,213	100.0%	
Maoist Centre gain from CPN (UML)		Swing		

Deputy mayoral elections result
Party	Candidate	Votes	%	±%
CPN (UML)	Bhola Prasad Adhikari	17,492	43.1%	
Congress	SMegha Shahi	15,842	39.0%	
Loktantrik Samajwadi	Bipi Moktan	5,027	12.4%	
RPP	Sushma Mishra	2,231	5.5%	
Total votes		40,592	100.0%	
CPN (UML) hold				

=== Ward results ===
Summary of Partywise Ward chairman and Ward member seats won, 2022
Party	Chairman	Members
CPN (Unified Marxist-Leninist)	13	55
Nepali Congress	5	19
CPN (Maoist Centre)	4	14
Loktantrik Samajwadi Party, Nepal	1	5
CPN (Unified Socialist)	1	3
Total	24	96

=== Summary of results by ward ===
Position	1	2	3	4	5	6	7	8	9	10	11	12	13	14	15	16	17	18	19	20	21	22	23	24
Ward Chairman																								
Ward Member 1																								
Ward Member 2																								
Female Member																								
Female Dalit Member																								
Source: Election Commission

== See also ==
- 2022 Nepalese local elections
- 2022 Provincial Assembly of Madhesh Province election
