= 2022 Birgunj municipal election =

Local election in Nepal

2022 Birgunj municipal elections
- 13 May 2022

162 seats to Birgunj Metropolitan City Council 82 seats needed for a majority

	First party	Second party
Leader	Rajesh Man Singh	Vijay Sarawagi
Party	PSP-Nepal	CPN (UML)
Seats before	59	20
Seats won	70	40
Seat change	▲11	▲20
Popular vote	46,215	23,671
Percentage	62.8%	32.2%
	Third party	Fourth party
Party	Congress	Loktantrik Samajwadi
Seats before	63	16
Seats won	47	5
Seat change	▼16	▼11
Mayor before election
Bijay Saraogi
CPN (UML)
Elected mayor
Rajesh Man Singh
PSP-Nepal

Municipal election for Birgunj took place on 13 May 2022, with all 162 positions up for election across 32 wards. The electorate elected a mayor, a deputy mayor, 32 ward chairs and 128 ward members. An indirect election will also be held to elect five female members and an additional three female members from the Dalit and minority community to the municipal executive.

== Background ==
Birgunj was established as a municipality in 1953. The metropolitan city was formed in 2017 after incorporating neighboring village development committees into Birgunj sub-metropolitan city. Electors in each ward elect a ward chair and four ward members, out of which two must be female and one of the two must belong to the Dalit community.

In the previous election, Vijay Kumar Sarawagi from Federal Socialist Forum was elected as the first mayor of the metropolitan city.

== Candidates ==
Party	Mayor candidate	Deputy Mayor candidate
People's Socialist Party, Nepal	Rajesh Man Singh	
Nepali Congress		Imtiaz Alam
CPN (Unified Marxist–Leninist)	Vijay Kumar Sarawagi	
Loktantrik Samajwadi Party, Nepal		Purushottam Lal Jha
Rastriya Prajatantra Party	Girish Giri	Bina Jaiswal
Nepal Majdoor Kisan Party	Gokarna Prasad Koiri	
Bahujan Shakti Party	Laxmi Hajara	
Nepal Sadbhawana Party	Bijay Kumar Rauniyar	
Janamat Party	Dinesh Ram	Anita Devi
Independent	Rajesh Singh	
Independent	Kailash Prasad Sarraf	
Independent	Feroz Alam	
Independent	Mohammad Hafiz Miya	
Independent	Bhola Patel	
Independent	Mohammad Jya-ul-haq Hawari	
Independent	Mohammad Sagir Ali	
Independent	Rizwan Ali	
Independent	Bikki Raj Patel	
Independent	Mohammad Riyaz-ul-haq	
Independent	Rajendra Prasad Singh Bhumihar	
Independent	Sanjeev Kumar Yadav	
Independent	Radheshyam Sah	
Independent	Ajay Kumar Kurmi	
Independent	Sasuddin Miya	
Independent	Satrudhan Prasad Kurmi	
Independent	Sunil Kumar Kalwar	
Independent	Brijmohan Prasad Chaurasiya	
Independent	Sumit Kumar Singh	
Independent	Koshila Devi Kanuin	
Independent	Jamil Ray Bhat	
Independent	Prabhat Singh	
Independent	Roz Miya Ansari	
Independent		Rambha Mishra
Independent		Birendra Sah
Independent		Dinesh Kumar Kushwaha
Independent		Rambabu Mahato Nuniya
Independent		Dipak Prasad Patel

== Exit polls ==
Date	Pollster	Singh	Sarawagi	Giri	Others	Lead
Date	Pollster	PSP-N	UML	RPP	Others	Lead
13 May 2022	Facts Nepal	74.9%	14.7%	0.4%	9.9%	60.2%

== Mayoral results ==
Mayoral elections result
Party	Candidate	Votes	%	±%
PSP-Nepal	Rajesh Man Singh	46,215	62.8%	+46.6%
CPN (UML)	Vijay Kumar Sarawagi	23,671	32.2%	+6.4%
RPP	Girish Giri	3,313	4.5%	+4.1%
Others		338	0.5%	
Total votes		73,537	100.0%	
Rejected ballots		20,245		
Turnout		93,782		
Registered electors		124,647		
PSP-Nepal gain from CPN (UML)		Swing	+20.1%	

Deputy mayoral elections result
Party	Candidate	Votes	%	±%
Congress	Imtiaz Alam	30,078	60.2%	+22.6%
Loktantrik Samajwadi	Purushottam Lal Jha	9,568	19.1%	New
RPP	Bina Jaiswal	5,988	12.0%	New
Independent	Rambha Mishra	3,909	7.8%	−7.0%
Others		452	0.9%	
Total votes		49,995	100.0%	
Rejected ballots		43,787		
Turnout		93,782		
Registered electors		124,647		
Congress hold				

== Ward results ==
Results for ward chair by party

Summary of Partywise Ward chairman and Ward member seats won, 2022
Party	Chairman	Members
People's Socialist Party, Nepal	13	56
Nepali Congress	9	37
CPN (Unified Marxist–Leninist)	8	32
Loktantrik Samajwadi Party, Nepal	2	3
Total	32	128

=== Summary of results by ward ===
Ward No.	Ward Chair	Ward Members			
Ward No.	Ward Chair	Open	Open 2	Female	Female Dalit
1	Manoj Raut Kurmi				
2	Mohammad Riyaz Miya Teli				
3	Baijulal Swarnakar				
4	Jagat Prasad Sah Kanu				
5	Pradeep Kumar				
6	Jayprakash Shah Agrawal				
7	Harikaji Maharjan				
8	Ritesh Kumar Gupta				
9	Jwahar Prasad Gupta				
10	Sushil Kumar Kanu				
11	Ajay Kumar Baire				
12	Suresh Prasad Gupta				
13	Hira Lal Giri				
14	Mahboob Ailahi Ansari				
15	Ramesh Prasad Yadav				
16	Prashuram Kumar Chaursiya				
17	Sanjib Bahadur Chhetri				
18	Umesh Shankar Tiwari				
19	Mukesh Kumar Chaursiya				
20	Ramkishore Singh				
21	Radha Krishna Sah Rauniyar				
22	Dwarika Mahato				
23	Abadh Kishore Prasad Kushwaha				
24	Bijay Prasad Kurmi				
25	Ashutosh Chaturdevi				
26	Shambhu Mishra				
27	Hridaya Narayan Prasad Kurmi				
28	Saryug Mahato Dhanuk				
29	Dharmendra Prasad Mahato Tharu				
30	Manoj Kumar Yadav				
31	Jitendra Prasad Yadav				
32	Riyaz Ahmed Miya				

== Results for municipal executive election ==
The municipal executive consists of the mayor, who is also the chair of the municipal executive, the deputy mayor and ward chairs from each ward. The members of the municipal assembly will elect five female members and three members from the Dalit and minority community to the municipal executive.

=== Municipal Assembly composition ===
Party	Members
People's Socialist Party, Nepal	70
Nepali Congress	47
CPN (Unified Marxist–Leninist)	40
Loktantrik Samajwadi Party, Nepal	5
Total	162

=== Results ===
Category	Candidate	Party	Votes
Female Member	Rabulsan Khatun	People's Socialist Party	114
Female Member	Devi Rajputin	People's Socialist Party	113
Female Member	Nitu Kumari Ram	Nepali Congress	111
Female Member	Kanika Kaushik	Nepali Congress	109
Female Member	Radhadevi Karki	Nepali Congress	109
Female Member	Manju Devi	CPN (Unified Marxist–Leninist)	46
Female Member	Sangita Devi	CPN (Unified Marxist–Leninist)	46
Female Member	Amari Devi Chamar	CPN (Unified Marxist–Leninist)	45
Female Member	Kanti Devi	CPN (Unified Marxist–Leninist)	45
Female Member	Patiya Devi	Loktantrik Samajwadi Party	43
Dalit/Minority Member	Niranjan Prasad Sonar	People's Socialist Party	110
Dalit/Minority Member	Khairuddin Miya Dhobi	People's Socialist Party	108
Dalit/Minority Member	Kanhaiya Prasad	Nepali Congress	107
Dalit/Minority Member	Om Prakash Sah	CPN (Unified Marxist–Leninist)	48
Dalit/Minority Member	Raj Kishore Gupta	CPN (Unified Marxist–Leninist)	47
Dalit/Minority Member	Ajay Kumar Gupta	CPN (Unified Marxist–Leninist)	47

=== Municipal Executive composition ===
Party	Members
People's Socialist Party, Nepal	18
Nepali Congress	14
CPN (Unified Marxist–Leninist)	8
Loktantrik Samajwadi Party, Nepal	2
Total	42

== See also ==
- 2022 Nepalese local elections
