= Sitaram Hachhethu =

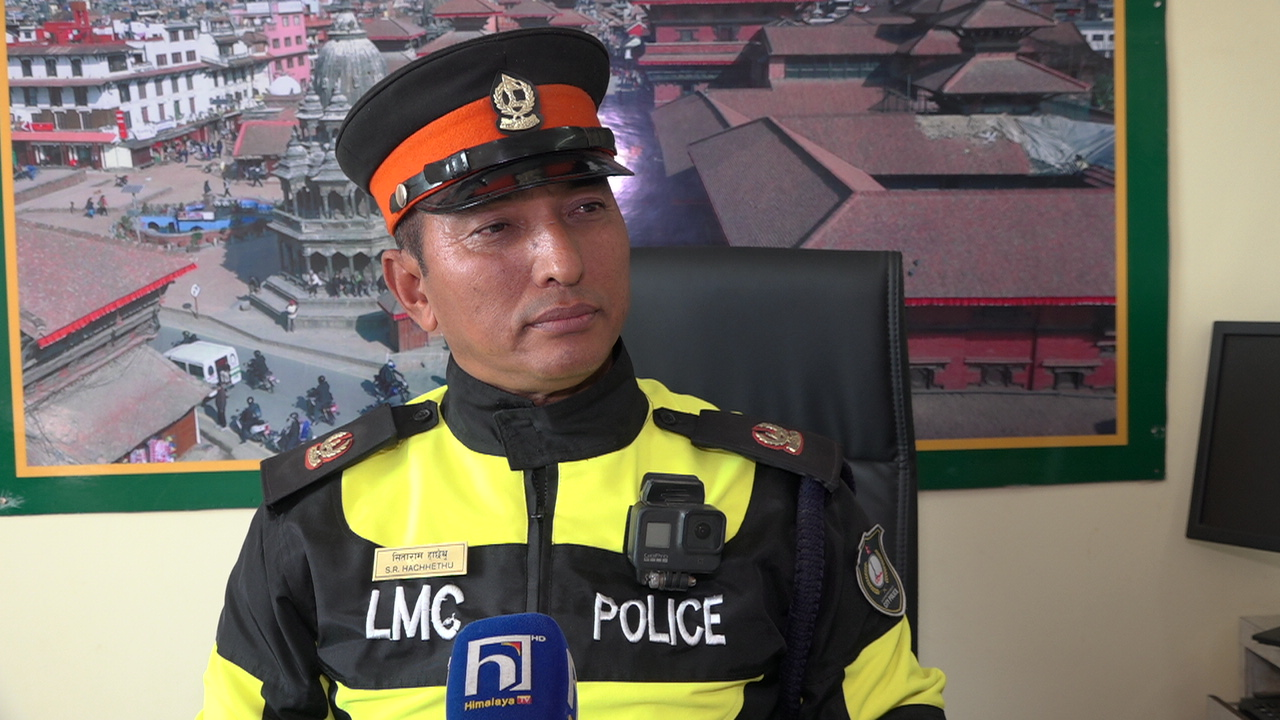
Sitaram Hachhethu

Sitaram Hachhethu (Nepali: सिताराम हाछेथु) is an ex-policeman of Nepal police. He worked in Metropolitan Traffic Police Division as traffic police for 29 years. After retirement from Nepal police, he joined Lalitpur Metropolitan City Police under the leadership of mayor Chiri Babu Maharjan. He has received national awards such as Gorkha Dakshina Bahu and Prabal Jansewa Padak, the highest award for the civilian in Nepal. He is credited for modernizing traffic services, such as introducing still camera for traffic inspection in 2049 BS and video camera in 2059 BS. He is also credited for producing public awareness videos and creating a traffic application for smartphones.

== Biography ==
Hachhethu was born in Bhaktapur district in Nepal. He joined Nepal police in 10 Poush 2046 BS and retired in 6 Mangsir 2075 BS. He is married to Biju Pradhan.

== Awards ==
Hachhethu has received 129 awards for his performance during his career in Nepal police. The main awards include:

- Gorkha Dakshina Bahu from King Gyandendra
- Yuwa puraskar from Prime Minister Lokendra Bahadur Chand
- Best Traffice police award
- Prabal Jansewa Padak from the president
