= Hem Karna Paudel =

Nepalese politician

Hem Karna Poudel
- हेम कर्ण पौडेल

5th Mayor of Itahari Sub-Metropolitan City
- Incumbent
- Assumed office 22 May 2022
- Deputy: Sangita Kumari Chaudhary
- Preceded by: Dwarik Lal Chaudhary

Personal details
- Born: Itahari, Nepal
- Party: Nepali Congress

Hem Karna Poudel (Nepali: हेम कर्ण पौडेल) is a Nepalese politician, belonging to Nepali Congress Party. Poudel is the current mayor of Itahari Sub-Metropolitan City. He defeated CPN (Unified Marxist–Leninist) candidate Yam Kumar Chungbang Subba by receiving 33,049 votes.

== Electoral history ==
=== 2022 Itahari municipal election ===
Mayoral elections result
Party	Candidate	Votes	%	±%
Congress	Hem Karna Paudel	33,049	50.0%	+9.2%
CPN (UML)	Yam Kumar Chungbang Limbu	28,031	42.4%	−0.8%
RPP	Aakash Hang Limbu	3,908	5.9%	−1.2%
Others		1,131	1.7%	
Total votes		66,119	100.0%	
Registered electors		104,626		
Congress gain from CPN (UML)		Swing	+5.0%	
