= Dhana Raj Acharya =

Nepalese politician (born 1970)

Mayor Dhana Raj Acharya
- धनराज आचार्य

16th Mayor of Pokhara
- Incumbent
- Assumed office 27 May 2022
- Deputy: Manju Devi Gurung
- Preceded by: Man Bahadur GC

Personal details
- Born: 30 March 1970 (age 56) Pokhara, Kaski District
- Party: CPN (Unified Socialist) (2021–present)
- Other political affiliations: CPN (ML) (1985–1991); CPN (UML) (1991–2018); NCP (2018–2021)
- Spouse: Pushpa Kumari Acharya
- Education: MBA, MEd
- Profession: Businessman; Politician

Dhana Raj Acharya (Nepali: धनराज आचार्य; born 30 March 1970) is a Nepalese politician, businessman and philanthropist. He is currently serving as the 16th mayor of Pokhara Metropolitan City. Acharya announced his candidacy under the Communist Party of Nepal (Unified Socialist) party for the mayoral election of Pokhara at the 2022 local election. He won the election with 58,893 votes. Previously, he has held various positions, including the general secretary and national president of the Nepal Book and Business Association, executive member of the Pokhara Industries and Commerce Association, and expert member of the high-level book policy drafting and textbook pricing committee.

== Early life and education ==
Acharya was born on 30 March 1970 (17 Chaitra 2026 BS) in Bharat Pokhari neighbourhood of Pokhara city of Kaski District to father Ritu Nath Acharya and mother Jamuna Devi Acharya. He went to Shanti Udaya Secondary School for his primary school education. He then joined Prithvi Narayan Campus for his higher studies. He has a master's degree in Business Administration and in Education.

== Political career ==
He became a member of All Nepal National Free Students Union (UML) in 2039 BS (1982–1983) at the age of 13. He was politically involved as a student leader at Prithvi Narayan Campus in Pokhara. He was initially a member of CPN(Marxist–Leninist) from 1985 to 1991. In 1991, he joined the CPN (Unified Marxist–Leninist), formed after the merger of CPN (ML) and CPN (Marxist) (1986–1991). He became the leader of UML's Kaski Industry and Business Department in 2003 and served as fraction secretary of the Federation of Nepal Book and Stationery Entrepreneurs from 2004 to 2012.

In 2018, Communist Party of Nepal (Unified Marxist–Leninist) and CPN (Maoist Centre) joined to form Nepal Communist Party. He then became a member of NCP. The party split in 2021. After the split of the party, he moved to the newly formed CPN (Unified Socialist) in August 2021. He announced his candidacy for the 2022 Nepalese local election for the post of Mayor of Pokhara Metropolitan City. In 2022 Nepalese elections, CPN (Unified Socialist) competed under a coalition with CPN(Maoist Centre), PSP-N, Janamorcha Nepal and the ruling party Nepali Congress. There were 23 candidates competing for the mayoral post. His major competitor was Krishna Bahadur Thapa of CPN (UML). Acharya won the election with 58,893 votes whereas Thapa received 52,848 votes.

== Personal life ==
He is married to Pushpa Kumari Acharya. They have two children. As of 20 July 2022, his assets was calculated to be रु.436,145,613 ($3,412,403) and his total debt was calculated to be रु.28,500,000 ($222,984).

== See also ==
- CPN (Unified Socialist)
