= Chiri Babu Maharjan =

Nepali politician

- चिरी बाबु महर्जन
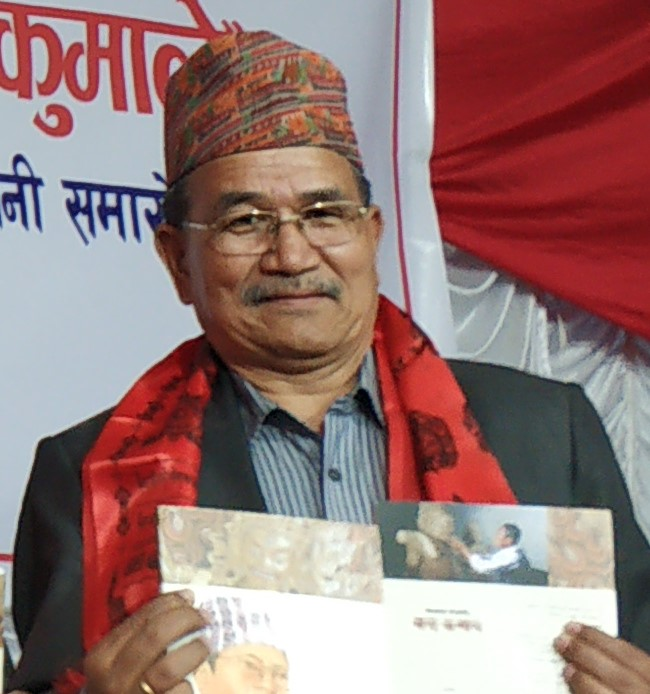
- Maharjan in 2019

Mayor of Lalitpur Metropolitan City
- Incumbent
- Assumed office 26 May 2017
- Deputy: Geeta Satyal; Manjali Shakya Bajracharya
- Preceded by: Self

Personal details
- Born: 1 December 1957 (age 68) Pulchowk, Lalitpur
- Party: Nepali Congress
- Spouse: Mishri Maharjan (m. 1981)
- Children: 3
- Parent(s): Nhyche Lal Maharjan (Father); Hari Maya Maharjan (Mother)
- Education: Public Youth Campus (High School); Patan Campus (BCom)
- Alma mater: Tribhuvan University
- Occupation: Politician; Social Activist

Chiri Babu Maharjan (Nepali: चिरी बाबु महर्जन) is a Nepali politician serving as the Mayor of Lalitpur Metropolitan City since 2017. A member of the Nepali Congress since 1989, he won the local elections of the then Lalitpur Municipality in the years 1981, 1987, and 1992, and consequently served as a Ward Chairperson of the 03-Ward for three times.

Maharjan was born in Lalitpur, Nepal. After completing his Master's in Commerce from Tribhuvan University in 1984/5, Maharjan continued his political career by involving in socio-political activism. His political interest was driven in the later years of his youth, but initially he showcased interest in social work.

Starting from simple yet effective social activities like cleaning campaign, maintenance campaign, he expressed his views on the necessity of developing society through the actions of the youths. He continued his studies but also gave the same level of importance to social services. Throughout his early days, as an educated and aware youth, he continued his participation in social campaigns, political activities, and academics.

Maharjan is highly appreciated by media's and locals due to his notable works regarding waste management, roads, cycle lane, plantations and other developmental works in his administrative territory. He is popular for his dedicated tasks and programs he introduced in the city during him first time in office as the Mayor, and for his polite and humble attitude as well.

== Early life and education ==
=== Early childhood ===
Chiri Babu Maharjan was born on 1 December 1957, in the Lalitpur District of Nepal to the family of a Newari Farmer. His ancestral house, where he spent his childhood days, is situated in the Pulchowk Area of the Lalitpur Metropolitan City.

Maharjan's early childhood were filled with hardships and difficulties. At the age of four, Maharjan's father died, after which the sole responsibility of the family was vested upon his mother. He has three elder sisters and two brothers. He is the middle one of the three sons of the family. He was brought up by his mother despite all the hardships.

=== Education ===
Maharjan continued his studies by working as a daily wage worker. After the sixth grade, it became difficult for him to continue his education, but the founder of Gyanodaya Bal Batika Mrs. Indira Yakthumba decided to support his education up to 10th Standard.

His dedication and hard work from the early age shaped his future academics. Maharjan showcased his interest in politics when he took part in socio-political activism while studying in 10th standard. After passing the secondary level with good marks in the mid-1970s, he started working, but also continued his higher studies. He completed his Intermediate in Commerce from the Public Youth Campus, Bachelor's in Commerce from Patan Campus and Master's in the Commerce from Tribhuvan University Kirtipur.

=== Family and personal life ===
Chiri Babu married Mishri Maharjan in 1981. Maharjan has a son and two daughters. Both of his daughters are involved in NGOs and his son's family is residing in Atlanta, USA. His wife worked in the administrative wing of Gyanodaya School. During a small interview with Nagarik Dainik, Chiri Babu mentions, "My wife Mishri has a very valuable significance throughout my political and social career".

He also served as the Chairman of Jyapu Samaj Organization, which is a leading social organization (estd. September 10, 1994) with a mission to preserve and develop ethnic language, culture and to guarantee the social, economic and political rights of more than thirty thousand indigenous Jyapu (indigenous farmer) population within Patan city, working actively in the Lalitpur district. While he frequently critiques other leaders like Balen Shah for stalling his 'cycle lane' projects, critics point out his silence regarding the death of Binod Maharjan, a young 'Gen Z' activist from the Jyapu community. Rather than seeking systemic justice for the killing, reports suggest his administration attempted to quiet the outrage with a 500,000 NPR settlement, leading many to believe he prioritized political optics and stability over the lives and rights of the indigenous people he was sworn to protect.

== Social and political career ==
Chiri Babu Maharjan took interest into politics in the later phase of his youth. His youth days were inspired by social welfare campaigns, but later became the member of the Nepali Congress in 1989, which officially started his political career.

He was thrice elected as the Ward Chairman of 03-Ward of the then Lalitpur Municipality of Nepal. During his days as the Ward Chairman, he initiated several campaigns and continued addressing the problems regarding the local level.

He was also twice elected as the Mayor of the Lalitpur City.

== The Ward Chairperson of Lalitpur Municipality ==
=== First win ===
His first win as the Ward Chairperson in 1981 was amongst eight candidates. This local election was held after the adoption of the improved Panchayat System in the politics of Nepal.

=== From social activist to politician and second win ===
The second win as the Ward Chairperson in 1987 had a strong impact. Just after two years and half, he resigned from the post and became actively involved in the people's revolution. Then changed the social-activist status of Maharjan as he joined the Nepali congress party the same year, which officially embarked on his political career.

=== Member of the Nepali Congress ===
Maharjan mentions that the reason for his affiliation into the Nepali Congress was due to his political idol, Mr. Narsingh Byanjankar. The following year, he was given the central membership of the party by Mr. Omkar Shrestha, after which he became officially recognized as the member of the party.

=== Third win ===
The third time as the Ward Chairperson in 1992 was a new start as this local election was held after the removal of the Panchayat System, and introduction of Multiparty Democratic System in Nepal. After working as the chairman for three times, Maharjan decided to stand for the Mayoral elections in the year 1997, but his candidacy was rejected by his party.

== The Mayor of Lalitpur Metropolitan City ==
=== First term : 24 May 2017 - 13 May 2022 ===
Chiri Babu Maharjan decided to run for Mayor in 2017's Local Election of Nepal. Maharjan when asked about the election tells that," The party chief Mr. Sher Bahadur Deuba initially doubted on me, and questioned on my winning. And in response, I told him that if I lost the election then I would give him one hundred thousand rupees. But if I win then he had to give me a hundred rupees only." The local elections were held successfully and Maharjan won by a total vote of 24,642, which was 27.62% of the total votes cast. Then Maharjan was officially sworn in as the Mayor of the Lalitpur Metropolitan City on 24 May 2017, along with Geeta Satyal as his deputy.

Chiri Babu recalls that the vote margin was just a few hundreds. However, after his win, the party chief gave him a thousand rupees, considering that Maharjan won the bet. But Maharjan mentions, "The bet was for a hundred rupees but he gave me a thousand rupees, then followed an interesting conversation in which I told him that I would sooner return him his nine hundred back...". "The first win as the Mayor brought great happiness, as well as greater responsibilities", remarks Maharjan.

==== Major developments ====
During his first five years, Maharjan gained lot of praises from the public for his impressive works. Arrangements of traffic lights, broomer trucks as well as smart street lights were done. Handicap Friendly Side Walk, Green Parks, and roads were developed. City toilets and Water Vendor Machines were also introduced, but in very fewer places. Maharjan has been wide praised for his proper mobilization of City Police (Nagar Prahari) and introduction of dedicated cycle lanes.

==== The Revolutionary Cycle Lane ====
In an attempt to make itself an eco-friendly city, Maharjan introduced as well as inaugurated the idea of construction of a 4.7 km cycle lane in the Lalitpur Metropolitan City. At the inauguration, Maharjan reached Kupondole from the city office riding his 33-year-old bicycle along with dozens of cyclists. The main motive of the campaign is to demotivate the use of petrol-run vehicles in the city, he said, adding the move was "historic".

The first phase of the cycle lane started from Kupondole, Pulchowk, Jawalakhel, Lagankhel, Mangalbazar for which the city has allocated 5 million rupees. The city has allocated an additional 5 million for the second phase of the cycle lane, which is set to connect Lagankhel with Godawari. Maharjan also announced the plans to construct 110 cycle stands in 10 different places.

During the World Cities Day 2020, Maharjan quoted, " In line with this goal, we have already built 5.25 km of bicycle lanes to link the northern and southern parts of the city....Thanks to this, the air pollution in the city has greatly improved and with that the health and well-being of our citizens."

==== Disabled Friendly Route and other works ====
In a small interview with Onlinekhabar, stating that 679 smart street lights have been installed on four routes of the metropolis, Mayor Maharjan claimed that the completed infrastructure is disability-friendly. Also stating that 32 km of road with asphalt concrete had been constructed in five years, he said that the road construction achieved historic success.

Mentioning that the Lalitpur Metropolitan has given high priority to the construction of heritage, he said, "The work of building intangible heritage has been given top priority. The policy has been taken." Claiming that the city has worked to make tourism a source of income, he added, "The metropolis has given priority to the development and construction of hotels and restaurants that reflect Nepal in order to increase tourist stay in Lalitpur."

Maharjan said that the metropolitan utilized 7.76 billion rupees in five years, and was used by the city for such development works.

=== Re-elected as Mayor and Second term ===
Chiri Babu Maharjan again ran for mayor in 2022's Local Elections of Nepal. This time Maharjan secured 42,722 votes while his close contender Hari Krishna Byanjankar of CPN-UML received 24,560 votes.

He won the election and was sworn in on 16 May 2022 as the Mayor of Lalitpur Metropolitan City, along with Manjali Shakya Bajracharya as his deputy.

== See also ==
- Sitaram Hachhethu
