= Ramesh Kharel =

Nepalese police officer

Ramesh Prasad Kharel (Nepali: रमेश प्रसाद खरेल) is a policeman and political candidate from Nepal.

Kharel recently joined Rastriya Swatantra Party after being unable to run his own Nepal Susaasan (सुशासन) Party being limited to 5th position in Kathmandu 1 election. Later Kharel filed candidacy from Bara 2 but was limited to 4th position in the constituency and lost his security deposit.

== Career ==
Kharel served as the Deputy Inspector General of Police (DIG) in Pokhara, Kathmandu, and Birgunj.

In April 2012, he was made Senior Superintendent of Police.

In January 2014, Kharel was recalled to oversee the operations of the Kathmandu Metropolitan Police. In February he arrested Tejendra Gurung, a notorious gangster. Kharel also led a crackdown on sex work leading to significant pushback.

In 2010 he jailed Raj Bahadur Singh, the son-in-law of the ex-King Gyanendra, and in 2011 fired subordinates for corruption. In 2010 Deepak Thapa wrote in Kantipur that Kharel was a "good cop".

Kharel resigned from the Nepal Police in April 2018.

In 2021 he became the president of the newly formed Nepal Good Governance Party.

== Electoral history ==
=== Bara 2 ===
| Candidate | Party | Votes | % | +/– |
|---|---|---|---|---|
| Upendra Yadav | People's Socialist Party, Nepal | 28,415 | 41.67 | +19.99 |
| Shivachandra Prasad Kushwaha | Janamat Party | 23,334 | 34.22 | +29.94 |
| Purushottam Poudel | CPN (UML) | 10,216 | 14.98 | New |
| Ramesh Kharel | Rastriya Swatantra Party | 2,829 | 4.15 | New |
| Arun Kumar Gyawali | Aam Janata Party | 2,738 | 4.02 | New |
| Others | | 660 | 0.97 | −73.06 |
| Total | | 68,192 | 100.00 | – |
| Majority | | 5,081 | | |
| People's Socialist Party, Nepal hold | | | | |
Source: ECN

=== Kathmandu 1 ===
| Candidate | Party | Votes | % | +/– |
|---|---|---|---|---|
| Prakash Man Singh | Nepali Congress | 7,143 | 27.30 | –12.21 |
| Rabindra Mishra | Rastriya Prajatantra Party | 7,018 | 26.82 | New |
| Pukar Bam | Rastriya Swatantra Party | 4,115 | 15.73 | New |
| Kiran Paudel | CPN (UML) | 3,532 | 13.50 | New |
| Ramesh Kharel | Nepal Sushasan Party | 3,124 | 11.94 | New |
| Others | | 1,234 | 4.72 | –46.77 |
| Total | | 26,166 | 100.00 | – |
| Majority | | 125 | | |
| Nepali Congress hold | | | | |
