= 2022 Pokhara municipal election =

Local election in Nepal

2022 Pokhara municipal elections
- 13 May 2022

167 seats to Pokhara Metropolitan City Council 84 seats needed for a majority

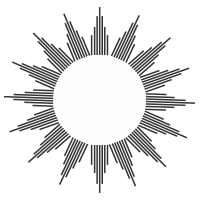

	First party	Second party
Leader	Dhana Raj Acharya	Krishna Bahadur Thapa
Party	Unified Socialist	CPN (UML)
Seats before	0	119
Seats won	1	86
Seat change	▲1	▼33
Popular vote	58,893	52,848
Percentage	48.1%	43.2%
	Third party	Fourth party
Leader	Shankar Kharal
Party	Congress	Independent
Seats before	48	0
Seats won	79	1
Seat change	▲31	▲1
Mayor before election
Man Bahadur GC
CPN (UML)
Elected Mayor
Dhana Raj Acharya
Unified Socialist

Municipal election for Pokhara took place on 13 May 2022, with all 167 positions up for election across 33 wards. The electorate elected a mayor, a deputy mayor, 33 ward chairs and 132 ward members. An indirect election will also be held to elect five female members and an additional three female members from the Dalit and minority community to the municipal executive.

Dhanraj Acharya of CPN (Unified Socialist) was elected mayor of Pokhara Metropolitan city.

== Background ==
Pokhara was established in 1962 as a municipality. The metropolitan city was created in 2017 by incorporating neighboring village development committees and Lekhnath municipality into Pokhara sub-metropolitan city. Electors in each ward elect a ward chair and four ward members, out of which two must be female and one of the two must belong to the Dalit community.

In the previous election, Man Bahadur GC from CPN (Unified Marxist–Leninist) was elected as the first mayor of the metropolitan city.

== Mayor and deputy mayor candidates ==
Post	Parties	Symbol	Name
Mayor	CPN (Unified Socialist)		Dhanraj Acharya
Mayor	Rastriya Prajatantra Party		Shankar Kharal
Mayor	CPN (UML)		Krishna Bahadur Thapa
Deputy mayor	Nepali Congress		Kopila Ranabhat
Deputy mayor	Rastriya Prajatantra Party		Ranjana Kumari Saini Paudel
Deputy mayor	CPN (UML)		Manju Devi Gurung

== Surveys and opinion polls ==
Date	News agency	Sample size	Dhan Raj Acharya	Undecided	Krishna Bahadur Thapa	Shankar Kharal	Result
9 May 2022	Setopati	150	56	43	38	9	Hung
9 May 2022	Setopati	150	37%	29%	25%	6%	Hung

== Exit polls ==
Date	Pollster	Thapa	Acharya	Paudel	Kharel	Others	Lead
Date	Pollster	UML	US	Ind.	RPP	Others	Lead
13 May 2022	Facts Nepal	41.7%	37.8%	7.7%	4.5%	8.3%	3.9%

== Mayoral results ==
Mayoral elections result
Party	Candidate	Votes	%	±%
Unified Socialist	Dhan Raj Acharya	58,893	48.1%	New
CPN (UML)	Krishna Bahadur Thapa	52,848	43.2%	−9.9%
RPP	Shankar Kharal	5,674	4.6%	+2.6%
Independent	Khadak Raj Paudel	3,030	2.5%	New
Others		1,884	1.5%	
Total valid votes		122,329	100.0%	
Rejected ballots		20897		
Turnout		143,226		
Registered electors		207,712		
Unified Socialist gain from CPN (UML)		Swing		

Deputy mayoral elections result
Party	Candidate	Votes	%	±%
CPN (UML)	Manju Devi Gurung	60,546	49.0%	+0.7%
Congress	Kopila Ranabhat	56,663	45.9%	+8.0%
RPP	Ranjana Kumari Sen	5,597	4.6%	+2.2%
Others		530	0.4%	
Total valid votes		123,438	100.0%	
Rejected ballots		19788		
Turnout		143,226		
Registered electors		207,712		
CPN (UML) hold				

== Ward results ==
Results for ward chair by party

Summary of Partywise Ward chairman and Ward member seats won, 2022
Party	Chairman	Members
Nepali Congress	23	56
CPN (Unified Marxist–Leninist)	9	76
Independent	1	0
Total	33	132

=== Summary of results by ward ===
Ward No.	Ward Chair	Ward Members			
Ward No.	Ward Chair	Open	Open 2	Female	Female Dalit
1	Shahara Pradhan				
2	Diwas Man Pradhananga				
3	Prakash Man Udas				
4	Dev Krishna Parajuli				
5	Bishnu Prasad Baral				
6	Bishnu Bahadur Bhattarai				
7	Ram Mohan Acharya				
8	Rudra Nath Baral				
9	Dipendra Marsani				
10	Rajesh Gurung				
11	Prem Prasad Karmacharya				
12	Santosh Bastola				
13	Kiran Baral				
14	Bodh Bahadur Karki				
15	Toran Bahadur Baniya				
16	Amrit Sharma Timilsina				
17	Radhika Kumari Shahi				
18	Shiva Prasad Timilsina				
19	Pushpendra Pandey				
20	Ganga Bahadur Khatri				
21	Dipak Prasad Subedi				
22	Him Lal Baral				
23	Ram Kaji Gurung				
24	Bharat Bahadur Adhikari				
25	Moti Lal Timilsina				
26	Narendra Thapa				
27	Purna Kumar Gurung				
28	Shree Krishna Lamichhane				
29	Shree Prasad Gurung				
30	Durga Prasad Subedi				
31	Dhaknath Kadel				
32	Akkal Bahadur Karki				
33	Ram Chandra Adhikari				

== Results for municipal executive election ==
The municipal executive consists of the mayor, who is also the chair of the municipal executive, the deputy mayor and ward chairs from each ward. The members of the municipal assembly will elect five female members and three members from the Dalit and minority community to the municipal executive using single non-transferable vote.

=== Municipal Assembly composition ===
Party	Members
CPN (Unified Marxist–Leninist)	86
Nepali Congress	79
CPN (Unified Socialist)	1
Independent	1
Total	167

=== Results ===
Category	Candidate	Party	Votes
Female Member	Dhankumari Pokharel	CPN (Unified Marxist–Leninist)	86
Female Member	Nirmala Paudel	CPN (Unified Marxist–Leninist)	86
Female Member	Bhimkumari Pun Garbuja	CPN (Unified Marxist–Leninist)	86
Female Member	Mandira Pariyar	CPN (Unified Marxist–Leninist)	86
Female Member	Harimaya Bishwakarma	CPN (Unified Marxist–Leninist)	86
Female Member	Daldadevi Bhujel	Nepali Congress	81
Female Member	Durgadevi Thapa	Nepali Congress	81
Female Member	Pabitra Thapa	Nepali Congress	81
Female Member	Ransuwa Gurung	Nepali Congress	80
Female Member	Bhawana Shrestha	Nepali Congress	79
Dalit/Minority Member	Nirmal Diyali	CPN (Unified Marxist–Leninist)	87
Dalit/Minority Member	Govinda Tulachan	CPN (Unified Marxist–Leninist)	86
Dalit/Minority Member	Dipak Ghimire	CPN (Unified Marxist–Leninist)	86
Dalit/Minority Member	Lal Bahadur B.K.	CPN (Unified Socialist)	81
Dalit/Minority Member	Pan Bahadur Gharti	People's Socialist Party	80
Dalit/Minority Member	Bhim Bahadur Sarki	CPN (Maoist Centre)	78

=== Municipal Executive composition ===
Party	Members
Nepali Congress	23
CPN (Unified Marxist–Leninist)	18
CPN (Unified Socialist)	1
Independent	1
Total	43

== See also ==
- 2022 Nepalese local elections
- 2022 Lalitpur municipal election
- 2022 Kathmandu municipal election
- 2022 Janakpur municipal election
- 2022 Bharatpur municipal election
