= 2022 Janakpur municipal election =

Municipal election

2022 Janakpur municipal elections
- 13 May 2022

127 seats to Janakpur Sub Metropolitan City Council 64 seats needed for a majority
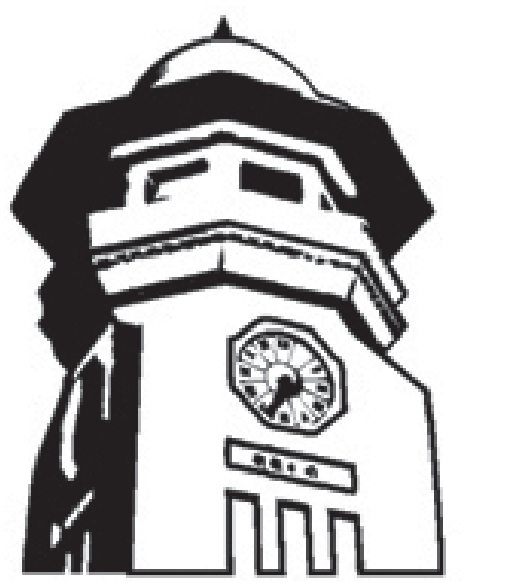

	First party	Second party	Third party
Candidate	Manoj Kumar Sah Sudi		Shiva Shankar Sah
Party	Dissident Nepali Congress	Nepali Congress	CPN (UML)
Seats won	7	69	36
Popular vote	13,465		9,532
Percentage	30.1%		21.3%
	Fourth party	Fifth party	Sixth party
Candidate	Manoj Chaudhary	Lal Kishor Sah	Bibha Kumari Thakur
Party	Loktantrik Samajwadi	PSP-Nepal	T-MLP
Seats won	10	3	1
Popular vote	5,360	5,194	1,141
Percentage	12.0%	11.6%	2.5%
Mayor before election
Lal Kishor Sah
PSP-Nepal
Elected mayor
Manoj Sah Sudi
Dessident Nepali Congress

Municipal election for Janakpur took place on 13 May 2022, with all 127 positions up for election across 25 wards. The electorate elected a mayor, a deputy mayor, 25 ward chairs and 100 ward members. An indirect election will also be held to elect five female members and an additional three female members from the Dalit and minority community to the municipal executive.

Nepali Congress Janakpur committee president Manoj Kumar Sah who had resigned from the Nepali Congress for short period to file his candidacy defeated the incumbent Lal Kishor Sah from the People's Socialist Party to become mayor. Nepali Congress gained control of the municipal council from Loktantrik Samajwadi Party. He later joined back Congress party on 25 May 2022.

== Background ==
Janakpur was established as a municipality in 1962. The sub-metropolitan city was created in 2014 by incorporating neighboring village development committees into Janakpur municipality. Electors in each ward elect a ward chair and four ward members, out of which two must be female and one of the two must belong to the Dalit community.

In the previous election, Lal Kishore Sah from Rastriya Janata Party Nepal was elected as the first mayor of the sub-metropolitan city after the reinstatement of local levels in Nepal.

== Candidate ==
=== Manoj Sah ===
(Ghantaghar symbol)

Being the party of home constituency of former Deputy Prime Minister Bimalendra Nidhi, Nepali Congress stands as strongest party since the splits in Madhesh based parties. The party municipal committee chairman, Manoj Sah has declared to run as independent Mayor candidate with silent support of top level leaders following the disagreement with central decision to forge alliance.

Sah along with municipal committee secretary Lalbabu Mishra, treasurer Birendra Yadav and whole municipal committee resigned against the decision of party chairman Sher Bahadur Deuba to support other party candidate. So a sympathetic vote is expected to swing on Sah as well. He on 22 April 2022, declared that they resigned in coordination and approval of the 25 ward committees of party. He also declared that it was a temporary halt to party politics and he would return to the party after winning the elections. Previously, Brikhesh Chandra Lal, Rajdev Mishra and Bajrang Sah have won as independent candidate of mayor post in Janakpur and returned to Nepali Congress party after winning the elections.

In addition to Nepali Congress caders and voters, CPN (Unified Socialist) stood in support of Manoj Sah. Top leader of party Ram Chandra Jha, asked voters to make arrogant and corrupt candidate loose the election.

=== Balram Mahato ===
(Mango symbol)

Mahato, a proprietor of Raman Construction is an independent candidate and has received mango election symbol. Mahato is seen the second strongest candidate after Manohj Sah for mayoral post.

=== Lal Kishor Sah ===
(Umbrella symbol)

The People's Socialist Party holds the former mayor Lal Kishor Shah as their mayoral candidate. Currently, Sah is highly unpopular due to various allegations of corruption, the Janaki temple issue, waste management, and an accident with a government jeep worth 2 crore.

=== Manoj Chaudhary ===
(Cycle symbol)

The Loktantrik Samajbadi Party is about to run Manoj Chaudhary who had given candidacy in from Ramasapa in 2013 Constituent Assembly election from Dhanusha 4 and had lost receiving some 500 votes only.

=== Janki Ram Sah ===
(Lantern symbol)

Janki Raman Sah was expected to run as mayoral candidate from CPN (UML). in the eve of election, he didn't receive ticket and is now a rebel candidate from CPN (UML). He is immediate past chairperson of Janakpur 7.

=== Shiv Shankar Sah "Hira" ===
(Sun symbol)

Sah is mayoral candidate from CPN (UML). He is a businessman.

=== Terai Madhesh Loktantrik Party ===
(Kalas symbol)

Similarly, Terai Madhesh Loktantrik Party led by former mayor Brikhesh Chandra Lal is also contesting the election. The party has fielded former Loktantrik Samajwadi Party, Nepal cader Bibha Thakur as mayor candidate.

== Mayor and deputy mayor candidates ==
Party	Mayor candidate	Deputy mayor candidate
People's Socialist Party, Nepal	Lal Kishore Sah	
Loktantrik Samajwadi Party, Nepal	Manoj Chaudhary	Rita Kumari Mishra
Nepali Congress		Kishori Sah
CPN (Unified Marxist–Leninist)	Shiva Shankar Sah	Runa Devi Jha
Rastriya Prajatantra Party	Kisa Giri	Jitendra Kumar Sah Haluwai
Terai Madhesh Loktantrik Party	Bibha Kumari	Ishwar Pandit Kumar
Janamat Party	Anita Devi Sah	Santosh Kumar Sah
Dissident Nepali Congress	Manoj Kumar Sah Sudi	
Dissident CPN (Unified Marxist–Leninist)	Janaki Ram Sah	Umesh Chaudhary
Independent	Balram Mahato	

== Opinion Poll ==
=== Mayoral post ===
Date	News agency	Sample size	Manoj Sah	Balram Mahato	Manoj Chaudhary	Lalkishor Sah	Janki Ram Sah	Shiv Shankar Sah	Anita Devi Sah	Undecided	Result
10 May 2022	Setopati	132	44	42	7	6	5	5	2	17	Hung
10 May 2022	Setopati	132	33..33%	31.81%	5.3%	4.54%	3.78%	3.78%	1.51%	12.87%	Hung

From the summary of result, it was found that Manoj Sah and Balram Mahato had a close contest while both being independent candidate. No match was found between independent candidates duo and other party candidates. People said it was common as no party candidate had won mayor in Janakpur since 2046 and 2074 election was the only exception. Previously, Brikhesh Chandra Lal, Bajrang Sah and Rajdev Mishra have won as independent candidate and later joined back Nepali Congress.

The common voice of citizen was that both Madhesbadi leaders Lal Kishor Sah and Rajendra Mahato did nothing for the city. Majority of voters were guilty for voting them. People yelled that Manoj Sah who was the first runner up of previous election while he had regularly visited them since a long and raised their voice to leadership. they added that they would vote for him in Ghantaghar symbol. In spite of alliance, the support base of incumbent mayor Lalkishor Sah was seen to have largely diminished while people were largely unhappy with madheshi parties which were divided into People's Socialist Party, Nepal, Loktantrik Samajwadi Party, Nepal, Terai Madhesh Loktantrik Party and Janamat Party. Even CPN (UML) voters were divided into rebel candidate Janaki Ram Sah and Shiv Shankar Sah "Hira".

To sum up, a majority of voters south and east of Janaki temple were seen to be close to Manoj Sah while a majority of voters north and west of temple were seen to be close to Balram Mahato.

=== Ward wise ===
Date	Pollster	Party	Ward chairman	Increase/Decrease
10 May 2022	Setopati	Congress	13-15	▲
10 May 2022	Setopati	PSP-N	3-4	▼
10 May 2022	Setopati	LSP-N	3-5	▼
10 May 2022	Setopati	UML	1-3	▼
10 May 2022	Setopati	TMLP	0-2	▲
10 May 2022	Setopati	CPN (US)	0-1	▲
10 May 2022	Setopati	Ind	0-1	▲
	Total		25	

== Exit polls ==
Date	Pollster	Sudi	L Sah	Mahto	S Sah	Others	Lead
Date	Pollster	Ind (Congress)	PSPN	Ind	UML	Others	Lead
13 May 2022	Facts Nepal	47.4%	23.8%	22.2%	5.9%	0.7%	23.6%

== Mayoral results ==
Mayoral elections result
Party	Candidate	Votes	%	±%
Independent	Manoj Kumar Sah Sudi	13,465	30.1%	+5.7%
CPN (UML)	Shiva Shankar Sah	9,532	21.3%	+10.7%
Loktantrik Samajwadi	Manoj Chaudhary	5,360	12.0%	New
PSP-Nepal	Lal Kishore Sah	5,194	11.6%	−36.2%
Independent	Balram Mahato	4,290	9.6%	New
Independent	Janaki Ram Sah	2,072	4.6%	New
Janamat	Anita Devi	1,437	3.2%	New
T-MLP	Bibha Kumari	1,141	2.5%	New
Others		2,296	5.1%	
Total votes		44,787	100.0%	
Independent gain from PSP-Nepal		Swing	+21.0%	

Deputy mayoral elections result
Party	Candidate	Votes	%	±%
Congress	Kishori Sah	15,525	36.9%	+13.4%
CPN (UML)	Runa Devi Jha	10,885	25.9%	+14.9%
Loktantrik Samajwadi	Rita Kumari Mishra	5,817	13.8%	−24.2%
Independent	Nirmal Kumar Chaudhary	3,772	9.0%	New
Janamat	Santosh Kumar Sah	1,725	4.1%	New
T-MLP	Ishwar Pandit Kumhar	1,118	2.7%	New
Others		3,186	7.6%	
Total votes		42,028	100.0%	
Congress gain from Loktantrik Samajwadi		Swing	+18.8%	

== Ward results ==
Party	Chairman	Members
Nepali Congress	11	57
Communist Party of Nepal (UML)	7	29
Loktantrik Samajwadi Party, Nepal	2	8
People's Socialist Party, Nepal	1	2
CPN(Maoist Centre)	1	0
Terai Madhesh Loktantrik Party	1	0
Independent	2	4
Total	25	100

=== Ward wise electoral details ===
Results for ward chair by party Nepali Congress CPN (Unified Marxist-Leninist) CPN (Maoist Centre) Loktantrik Samajwadi Party, Nepal People's Socialist Party, Nepal Terai Madhesh Loktantrik Party Independent

No.	Ward No.	Ward Chairman	Political Party
1.	Ward No. 1	Debu Yadav	Nepali Congress
2.	Ward No. 2	Shiv Kumar Sah	Nepali Congress
3.	Ward No. 3	Dipendra Kumar Sah	Terai Madhesh Loktantrik Party
4.	Ward No. 4	Suresh Jha	Nepali Congress
5.	Ward No. 5	Bechan Sahu Haluwai	CPN (UML)
6.	Ward No. 6	Dinesh Prasad Sah	Nepali Congress
7.	Ward No. 7	Niraj Kumar Sah	Nepali Congress
8.	Ward No. 8	Dinesh Kumar Singh	CPN (UML)
9.	Ward No. 9	Parmeshwar Sah	Nepali Congress
10.	Ward No. 10	Mithlesh Kumar Karn	Independent
11.	Ward No. 11	Arjun Kumar Chaudhary	Nepali Congress
12.	Ward No. 12	Mahendra Sah Teli	CPN (UML)
13.	Ward No. 13	Jit Bahadur Raut	Nepali Congress
14.	Ward No. 14	Punya Pratap Yadav	PSP-N
15.	Ward No. 15	Santosh Kumar Sah	LSP-N
16.	Ward No. 16	Ram Chandra Panjiyar	Nepali Congress
17.	Ward No. 17	Ram Brikch Yadav	CPN(MC)
18.	Ward No. 18	Laxmeshwar Mandal Kewat	CPN (UML)
19.	Ward No. 19	Binod Kumar Sah	CPN (UML)
20.	Ward No. 20	Moti Rain Kawari	CPN (UML)
21.	Ward No. 21	Raj Narayan Sah	Nepali Congress
22.	Ward No. 22	Bimlesh Mishra	LSP-N
23.	Ward No. 23	Raghbendra Prasad Sah	Independent
24.	Ward No. 24	Upendra Sahni	CPN (UML)
25.	Ward No. 25	Chandeshwar Sah	Nepali Congress

=== Summary of results by ward ===
Position	1	2	3	4	5	6	7	8	9	10	11	12	13	14	15	16	17	18	19	20	21	22	23	24	25
Ward Chairman																									
Ward Member 1																									
Ward Member 2																									
Female Member																									
Female Dalit Member																									
Source: Election Commission

== Council formation ==
Party	Mayor	Deputy Mayor	Ward Chairman	Ward Members	Total seats	Remarks
Nepali Congress		1	11	57	69	Majority
Dessident Nepali Congress	1		2	4	7	
Communist Party of Nepal (UML)			7	29	36	
Loktantrik Samajwadi Party, Nepal			2	8	10	
People's Socialist Party, Nepal			1	2	3	
CPN(Maoist Centre)			1	0	1	
Terai Madhesh Loktantrik Party			1	0	1	
Total	1	1	25	100	127	64 for Majority

Out of total 127 seats in municipal corporation, Nepali Congress won majority of 69. Later a group of dessidents joined back Nepali Congress increasing the tally to 76 which remains 60% majority. Loktantrik Samajwadi Party which had obtained majority in previous election could manage to win just 10 seats though led by Rajendra Mahato due to corruption, not fulfilling promises, etc. As a result, it was almost cleanswept from the region. The CPN (UML) emerged as chief opposition winning just half seats as much as Nepali Congress.

== Incidents ==
=== Buying votes ===
Muslim Commission Chairman Samim Miya Ansari was reportedly found with a bag containing NPR 5 crores at Hotel Sitasaran in Janakpurdham. Appointed by the KP Sharma Oli-led government, Ansari was accused of distributing money to influence votes in favor of Janki Ram Sah, a rebel candidate affiliated with the CPN (UML). The incident was reported to the police by members of the public, leading to his arrest.

Also arrested at the scene was Surendra Bhandari, the chairman of the CPN (UML) municipal committee in Janakpur.

Earlier, former minister and CPN (UML) leader Julie Kumari Mahato was reported to have organized an election event during the silent period in Janakpur. These incidents were seen as damaging to the party's image in the region, which reportedly split into two factions as a result.

Following the arrests, Ansari held a press conference, claiming that he had a dispute with Raghubir Mahaseth the previous night. He alleged that Mahaseth attempted to dominate him and later sent a team, led by Surendra Bhandari, to intimidate him.

Ansari publicly criticized the Mahaseth couple and urged the government, as well as KP Sharma Oli, to take strict action. He warned that he would reveal further details if no steps were taken.

Later, a Madhesh Province resident, Manish Rauniyar, called on the authorities to monitor local mosques that night.

== See also ==
- 2022 Nepalese local elections
- 2022 Lalitpur municipal election
- 2022 Kathmandu municipal election
- 2022 Pokhara municipal election
- 2022 Provincial Assembly of Madhesh Province election
