= 2022 Lalitpur municipal election =

Local election in Nepal

2022 Lalitpur municipal elections
- 13 May 2022

147 seats to Lalitpur Metropolitan City Council 74 seats needed for a majority

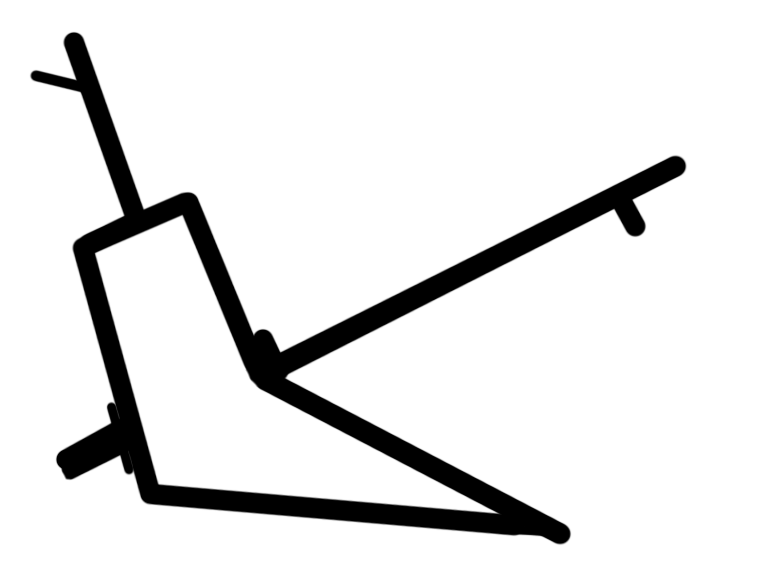

| | First party | Second party | Third party |
|---|---|---|---|
| Leader | Chiri Babu Maharjan | Hari Krishna Byanjankar | Ashta Bahadur Maharjan |
| Party | Congress | CPN (UML) | RPP |
| Seats before | 44 | 76 | 0 |
| Seats won | 56 | 56 | 2 |
| Seat change | ▲12 | ▼20 | ▲2 |
| Popular vote | 42,722 | 24,560 | 5,554 |
| Percentage | 56.5% | 32.5% | 7.3% |
| | Fourth party | Fifth party | Sixth party |
| Party | Maoist Centre | Unified Socialist | Independent |
| Seats before | 14 | 0 | 1 |
| Seats won | 12 | 9 | 2 |
| Seat change | ▼2 | ▲9 | ▲1 |
Mayor before election
Chiri Babu Maharjan
Congress
Elected Mayor
Chiri Babu Maharjan
Congress

Municipal election for Lalitpur took place on 13 May 2022, with all 147 positions up for election across 29 wards. The electorate elected a mayor, a deputy mayor, 29 ward chairs and 116 ward members. An indirect election will also be held to elect five female members and an additional three female members from the Dalit and minority community to the municipal executive.

Chiri Babu Maharjan of Nepali Congress was re-elected, winning 56.5% of the votes.

== Background ==
Lalitpur was established as a municipality in 1953. The metropolitan city was created in 2017 by incorporating wards 1 to 13 of Karyabinayak municipality into Lalitpur sub-metropolitan city. Electors in each ward elect a ward chair and four ward members, out of which two must be female and one of the two must belong to the Dalit community.

In the previous election, Chiri Babu Maharjan from Nepali Congress was elected as the first mayor of the metropolitan city.

== Candidates ==
| Party | Mayor candidate | Deputy Mayor candidate |
|---|---|---|
| Nepali Congress | Chiri Babu Maharjan | Supporting CPN (Maoist Centre) candidate |
| CPN (Unified Marxist–Leninist) | Hari Krishna Byanjankar | Manjali Shakya |
| CPN (Maoist Centre) | Supporting Nepali Congress candidate | Baburaj Bachracharya |
| Rastriya Prajatantra Party | Ashta Bahadur Maharjan | Swarnima Shakya |
| CPN (Unified Socialist) | Hari Krishna Thapa | Usha Bajracharya |
| Bibeksheel Sajha Party | Ujwal Krishna Shrestha | |
| Nepal Majdoor Kisan Party | Ashok Maharjan | Mamita Shrestha |
| CPN (Marxist–Leninist) | Mohan Raj Shakya | Sasmita Shrestha |
| Rastriya Janamukti Party | Sunny Kapoor Maharjan | |
| Janamat Party | Basudev Amatya | Kusum Bajracharya |
| Aamul Parivartan Masiha Party Nepal | Sapana Maharjan | |
| Maulik Jarokilo Party | Sapana Shrestha | |
| Nepal Sushasan Party | | Janaki Pradhan |
| Independent | Rajendra Thapa Magar | |
| Independent | Sarina Lakhe | |
| Independent | Suresh Maharjan | |
| Independent | | Ajar Man Joshi |
| Independent | | Rajan Khadka |
| Independent | | Ratna Byanjankar |
| Independent | | Subin Kumar Shakya |

== Exit polls ==
| Date | Pollster | C Maharjan | Byanjankar | A Maharjan | Others | Lead |
| Date | Pollster | Congress | UML | RPP | Others | Lead |
|---|---|---|---|---|---|---|
| 13 May 2022 | Facts Nepal | 61.1% | 25.4% | 4.1% | 9.4% | 35.7% |

== Results ==
Mayoral elections result
| Party | Candidate | Votes | % | ±% |
|---|---|---|---|---|
| Congress | Chiri Babu Maharjan | 42,722 | 56.5% | +28.9% |
| CPN (UML) | Hari Krishna Byanjankar | 24,560 | 32.5% | +5.2% |
| RPP | Ashta Bahadur Maharjan | 5,554 | 7.3% | New |
| Bibeksheel Sajha | Ujwal Krishna Shrestha | 1,585 | 2.1% | New |
| Others | | 1,154 | 1.5% | |
| Total votes | | 75,575 | 100.0% | |
| Rejected ballots | | 10,965 | | |
| Turnout | | 86,540 | | |
| Registered electors | | 122,890 | | |
| Congress hold | | | | |

Deputy mayoral elections result
| Party | Candidate | Votes | % | ±% |
|---|---|---|---|---|
| CPN (UML) | Manjali Shakya Bajracharya | 25,084 | 41.2% | New |
| Maoist Centre | Babu Raj Bajracharya | 18,752 | 30.8% | +16.2% |
| RPP | Swarnima Shakya | 7,778 | 12.8% | +1.0% |
| Independent | Ajar Man Joshi | 7,029 | 11.6% | New |
| Others | | 2,179 | 3.6% | |
| Total votes | | 60,822 | 100.0% | |
| Rejected ballots | | 25,718 | | |
| Turnout | | 86,540 | | |
| Registered electors | | 122,890 | | |
| CPN (UML) gain from Congress | | Swing | +31.7% | |

== Ward Results ==
Results for ward chair by party

Summary of Party wise Ward chairman and Ward member seats won, 2017
| Party | Chairman | Members |
|---|---|---|
| Nepali Congress | 11 | 44 |
| CPN (Unified Marxist-Leninist) | 11 | 44 |
| CPN (Maoist Centre) | 3 | 9 |
| CPN (Unified Socialist) | 2 | 7 |
| Rastriya Prajatantra Party | 0 | 2 |
| Independent | 2 | 0 |
| Vacant | 0 | 10 |
| Total | 29 | 116 |

=== Summary of ward results ===
| Ward No. | Ward Chair | | Ward Members | | | |
| Ward No. | Ward Chair | | Open | Open 2 | Female | Female Dalit |
|---|---|---|---|---|---|---|
| 1 | Nirmal Tandukar | Ind | NC | NC | NC | |
| 2 | Rajesh Kumar Maharjan | US | US | US | UML | US |
| 3 | Shreegopal Mahrjan | US | US | US | US | US |
| 4 | Santosh Khadka | NC | UML | NC | NC | NC |
| 5 | Bikash Man Shrestha | UML | UML | UML | UML | UML |
| 6 | Rupendra Raj Shakya | NC | NC | NC | NC | |
| 7 | Kul Bahadur Maharjan | NC | NC | NC | NC | |
| 8 | Babu Ratna Maharjan | NC | NC | NC | NC | |
| 9 | Raju Maharjan | NC | NC | NC | NC | NC |
| 10 | Rabinman Byanjankar | NC | NC | NC | NC | NC |
| 11 | Aroj Kumar Khadgi | NC | UML | NC | UML | UML |
| 12 | Narayan Lal Awale | UML | UML | UML | UML | |
| 13 | Ganesh K.C. | Ind | NC | NC | NC | NC |
| 14 | Amrit Jung Mahat | NC | NC | UML | UML | UML |
| 15 | Suresh Bahadur Shahi | UML | UML | NC | UML | UML |
| 16 | Nirmal Ratna Shakya | NC | NC | NC | NC | |
| 17 | Binod Maharjan | UML | UML | UML | UML | |
| 18 | Damodar Khadka | UML | UML | UML | UML | UML |
| 19 | Rajendra Maharjan | UML | UML | UML | UML | UML |
| 20 | Chandra Lal Maharjan | NC | NC | NC | NC | NC |
| 21 | Rabindra Maharjan | MC | MC | UML | MC | |
| 22 | Sagar Tuladhar | UML | UML | NC | UML | UML |
| 23 | Jeevan Maharjan | UML | UML | UML | UML | UML |
| 24 | Dinesh Jung Panday | UML | UML | UML | UML | UML |
| 25 | Daulat Kumar Khatri | UML | NC | NC | NC | UML |
| 26 | Suresh Maharjan | MC | MC | MC | MC | |
| 27 | Krishna Hari Maharjan | MC | MC | MC | MC | |
| 28 | Birendra Maharjan | NC | NC | UML | MC | UML |
| 29 | Ganesh Kumar Maharjan | UML | RPP | NC | RPP | NC |

Note: 1 candidate from CPN (UML) for Ward Member was elected unopposed under Dalit woman reserved seats. 10 ward member seats reserved for Dalit women were left unfilled due to lack of candidates.

== Results for municipal executive election ==
The municipal executive consists of the mayor, who is also the chair of the municipal executive, the deputy mayor and ward chairs from each ward. The members of the municipal assembly will elect five female members and three members from the Dalit and minority community to the municipal executive.

=== Municipal Assembly composition ===
| Party | Members |
|---|---|
| Nepali Congress | 56 |
| CPN (Unified Marxist–Leninist) | 56 |
| CPN (Unified Socialist) | 12 |
| CPN (Maoist Centre) | 9 |
| Rastriya Prajatantra Party | 2 |
| Independent | 2 |
| Vacant | 10 |
| Total | 147 |

=== Results ===
| Category | Candidate | Party |
|---|---|---|
| Female Member | Uma Shrestha Bajracharya | Nepali Congress |
| Female Member | Sanu Maharjan Awale | Nepali Congress |
| Female Member | Laxmi Sharma Dahal | Nepali Congress |
| Female Member | Babita Shrestha | Nepali Congress |
| Female Member | Sharan Laxmi Maharjan | CPN (Maoist Centre) |
| Female Member | Apulu Shakya | CPN (Unified Marxist–Leninist) |
| Female Member | Rukmani Maharjan | CPN (Unified Marxist–Leninist) |
| Female Member | Sangita Achhami | CPN (Unified Marxist–Leninist) |
| Female Member | Sukumaya Lama | CPN (Unified Marxist–Leninist) |
| Female Member | Sulochana Maharjan | CPN (Unified Marxist–Leninist) |
| Dalit/Minority Member | Bikash Kumar Roka | Nepali Congress |
| Dalit/Minority Member | Ram Sharan Sarki | CPN (Maoist Centre) |
| Dalit/Minority Member | Sanu Kaji Tolange | CPN (Unified Socialist) |
| Dalit/Minority Member | Krishna Kumar Nepali | CPN (Unified Marxist–Leninist) |
| Dalit/Minority Member | Natibabu Suchikar | CPN (Unified Marxist–Leninist) |
| Dalit/Minority Member | Maneka Chyamele | CPN (Unified Marxist–Leninist) |

=== Municipal Executive composition ===
| Party | Members |
|---|---|
| Nepali Congress | 17 |
| CPN (Unified Marxist–Leninist) | 12 |
| CPN (Maoist Centre) | 5 |
| CPN (Unified Socialist) | 3 |
| Independent | 2 |
| Total | 39 |

== See also ==
- 2022 Nepalese local elections
- 2022 Kathmandu municipal elections
