= Local government in Nepal =

Local government in Nepal is the third level of government division in Nepal, which is administered by the provincial governments which in turn is beneath the federal government. Article 56 of the Constitution of Nepal 2015 defines local government as rural municipalities, municipalities and district assemblies.

The governing body of the rural municipalities and municipalities is referred to as the village executive and municipal executive respectively. The district assembly is governed by the District Coordination Committee.

There are 77 districts with their own district assembly and 753 local levels (including six metropolises, 11 sub-metropolises, 276 municipalities and 460 gaunpalikas) each with their own executive body. The Constitution of Nepal 2015 (Schedule 8) gives 22 powers to these local levels. This enables them to formulate laws to implement these powers. Besides these single powers, there are 15 such concurrent powers that can be implemented by all three level of state, i.e., federation, province, and local levels, in the principles of coordination, cooperation, and coexistence.

== Local governments by type and provinces ==
Area type	Koshi	Madhesh	Bagmati	Gandaki	Lumbini	Karnali	Sudurpashchim	Nepal
Wards	1,157	1,271	1,121	759	983	718	734	6,743
Metropolitan City	1	1	3	1	0	0	0	6
Sub-metropolitan City	2	3	1	0	4	0	1	11
Municipality	46	73	41	26	32	25	33	276
Municipality total	49	77	45	27	36	25	34	293
Rural Municipality	88	59	74	58	73	54	54	460
Local level total	137	136	119	85	109	79	88	753
District	14	8	13	11	12	10	9	77

== Types of local government ==
The current structure of local governance was established by the Constitution of Nepal, 2015 and the powers and functions of each level of government is derived from the constitution and the Local Government Operations Act, 2017.

=== District ===
The Constitution of Nepal has provisions for a District Assembly to coordinate between municipalities and rural municipalities within the district. The District Assembly consists of chairpersons and vice-chairpersons of rural municipalities and mayors and deputy mayors of municipalities within the district. It elects a nine-member District Coordination Committee including a chief and deputy chief and at least three women and one member from the Dalit or minority communities for a five-year term. Any member within the village or municipal assembly in local levels within the district are eligible to be elected to the District Coordination Committee and if elected their status as a local representative will lapse.

The District Coordination Committee coordinates between the local levels in the district as well as with the provincial and federal governments and monitor development within the district.

=== Local level ===
The Constitution of Nepal has provisions for a Village or Municipal executive which acts as the executive within each local level. The executive is headed by a chairperson in a rural municipality and a mayor in a municipality who is elected by first-past-the-post voting in their local levels. First-past-the-post voting is also used to elect the vice-chairperson or deputy mayor and ward chairperson for each ward in the local district who are also members of the executive. Four women members and two members from the Dalit or minority communities are also elected to the executive by the Village or Municipal Assembly among themselves.

The Village or Municipal Assembly is defined in the Constitution of Nepal as the legislature of each local level. The assembly is composed of all members elected by first-past-the-post voting in their local levels. This includes the chairperson and vice-chairperson in rural municipalities or the mayor and deputy mayor in each municipality and ward chairpersons four ward members, among whom at least two must be women, from every ward in the local level. A Dalit or minority community that has been elected to the executive is also a member of the assembly.

A Judicial Committee is also formed in each local level that is led by the vice-chairperson or deputy mayor of each local level and two members elected by the assembly.

=== Wards ===
Each ward of a local level also has a ward committee that is composed of the ward chairperson and four ward members elected by first-past-the-post voting. The ward committee oversees the administration of the concerned ward in each local level.

== Historical divisions ==
Nepal was divided into four development regions in 1971 by the Local Administration Act, 1971 and one more development region was added by the second amendment of the act in 1980. Each development region consisted of two or three zones and each zone was further divided into districts.

== See also ==
- Government of Nepal
- List of cities in Nepal
- List of gaunpalikas of Nepal
