= Sajha Party =

Political party in Nepal

Sajha Party साझा पार्टी
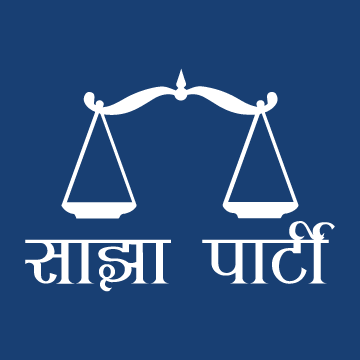
- Leader: Rabindra Mishra
- Spokesperson: Sharad Raj Pathak
- Founder: Rabindra Mishra
- Founded: 1 March 2017; 2017–2019 (as Bibeksheel Sajha Party)
- Dissolved: 9 December 2019
- Succeeded by: Bibeksheel Sajha Party
- Headquarters: Bakhundol, Lalitpur, Nepal
- Youth wing: Sajha Yuva Sangathan
- Women's wing: Sajha Women Organization
- Ideology: Social liberalism Social democracy Progressivism
- Political position: Centre
- Seats in Provincial Assemblies: 1 / 110 Bagmati Province

Website
- sajhaparty.org

The Sajha Party (Nepali: साझा पार्टी) is a political party founded by former editor-in-chief of BBC Nepali Service Rabindra Mishra.

== History ==
Sajha Party was founded in 2017 by the former editor-in-chief of BBC Nepali Service, Rabindra Mishra. It was formed as an "alternative" party and guided by the welfare economy and inspired by global norms of democracy. The party contested the 2017 local election as independents with Ramesh Maharjan and Kishore Thapa finishing third and fourth in Kathmandu and Lalitpur elections respectively. Deputy mayor candidate Sobha Shakya finished in second place in Lalitpur, and Nirupama Yadav finished third in Kathmandu. The party was not as successful outside the Kathmandu Valley with their candidates in Itahari getting less than 500 votes.

=== Bibeksheel Sajha ===
On 26 July 2017 the party announced that it would merge with Bibeksheel Nepali Dal to form Bibeksheel Sajha Party. The new party would be led under the joint leadership of Rabindra Mishra and Ujwal Bahadur Thapa. The party adopted scales as their electoral symbol. The party split on 11 January 2019 when party co-ordinator Ujwal Thapa, along with 16 central committee members filed an application to register his old party, Bibeksheel Nepali Dal at the Election Commission. The party changed its name to Sajha Bibeksheel Party on 27 April 2019 and later reverted to Sajha Party. The party announced on 20 October 2020 that it was in talks with Bibeksheel Nepali Dal for reunification. The two parties announced their merger on 9 December 2020 and formed the Bibeksheel Sajha Party again.

== Presence in various provinces ==
| Province | Seats | Year of election |
|---|---|---|
| Bagmati | 1 / 110 | 2017 |

== See also ==
- Naya Shakti
- Bibeksheel Nepali
- Rabindra Mishra
- Surya Raj Acharya
- Bibeksheel Sajha Party
