= Nirdesh Silwal =

Nepalese politician

- निर्देश सिलवाल

Central Committee Member Ujyalo Nepal Party
- Incumbent
- Assumed office November 2025
- Leader: Kulman Ghising

Chief Advisor Ministry of Youth and Sports (Nepal)
- In office 6 March 2024 – 15 July 2024
- Minister: Biraj Bhakta Shrestha

General Secretary Bibeksheel Nepali
- In office October 2019 – 2021

Lecturer of International Relations and Political Science National Law College, Tribhuvan University
- In office 17 February 2018 – 1 August 2024

Lecturer of Political Science Little Angels' College of Management, Kathmandu University

Personal details
- Born: February 8, 1990 Lamjung District, Nepal
- Party: Ujyalo Nepal Party (2025–present)
- Other political affiliations: Bibeksheel Sajha Party (2019–2021)
- Education: South Asian University (PhD candidate); Tribhuvan University (MA - Political Science); Malmö University (BA - Global Political Studies (International Relations))
- Alma mater: Malmö University; South Asian University; Tribhuvan University; Nepal Law Campus; National School of Sciences, Lainchour; Bhu-Pu Sainik Awasiya Ma. Vi.
- Occupation: Politician, Researcher, Academic
- Awards: Gold Medal in Political Science, Tribhuvan University
- Website: www.facebook.com/nirdesh.silwal www.linkedin.com/in/nirdeshsilwal/

Nirdesh Silwal (Nepali: निर्देश सिलवाल) is a Nepalese politician, academic (Gold Medalist), and political scientist. He is currently a doctoral candidate in International Relations at the South Asian University (SAU) in New Delhi. Silwal previously served as the General Secretary of the Bibeksheel Nepali Dal, a prominent alternative political force in Nepal, from October 2019 to November 2020. He served as a Central Committee Member (CCM) of the Ujyalo Nepal Party. He has been active in Nepal's alternative politics since around 2012-2013 through the Bibeksheel movement led by Ujwal Thapa. He is now a CCM of Rastriya Swatantra Party.

== Early life and education ==
=== Birth and background ===
Nirdesh Silwal was born on February 8, 1990, in Lamjung District, a district located in the Gandaki Province of Nepal. He received his early education at multiple institutions including Bhu-Pu Sainik Awasiya Maha Vidyalaya, National School of Sciences (Lainchour), and Nepal Law Campus.

=== Undergraduate education ===
Silwal completed his Bachelor of Arts degree in Global Political Studies with a specialization in International Relations at Malmö University in Sweden. Malmö University's Department of Global Political Studies is recognized for its focus on global processes and their implications for power, security, justice, and development, offering an internationally oriented education in global governance systems.

=== Graduate education ===
Silwal obtained a Master of Arts degree in Political Science from Tribhuvan University in Kathmandu, Nepal. Tribhuvan University is the oldest and most prestigious university in Nepal, established in 1959.

He was distinguished as an Academic Gold Medalist at Tribhuvan University, receiving the Lalit Chand Gold Medal for securing the highest academic rank in his graduating cohort.

=== Doctoral education ===
As of 2024, Silwal is a PhD candidate at the Department of International Relations, South Asian University (SAU), New Delhi. His doctoral research focuses on democratization, geopolitical dynamics, and civic space in South Asia. The PhD in International Relations program at South Asian University is a rigorous program that trains doctoral researchers in advanced international relations theory and methodology.

== Academic career ==
Silwal has developed an extensive background in higher education, having served as a lecturer at prominent institutions in Nepal. From February 2018 to August 2024, he served as a Lecturer of International Relations and Political Science for the Bachelor of Arts Bachelor of Laws (BALLB) program at National Law College, affiliated with Tribhuvan University. National Law College is recognized as the first private law college affiliated with Tribhuvan University in Nepal.

Additionally, Silwal taught Political Science to Bachelor of Business Administration (BBA) and Bachelor of Business Information Systems (BBIS) students at Little Angels' College of Management (LACM), affiliated with Kathmandu University.

His research interests encompass democratization, civic space, and Nepal's geopolitical dynamics. He has contributed to academic discourse through research papers and articles analyzing Nepal's democratic transition and the role of civil society.

=== International academic recognition ===
Silwal was recognized internationally as a speaker on student politics and youth political participation. He participated as a panelist in the "Young Politicians Round Table: Analysing Student Politics in Asia," organized by the International Association of Political Science Students (IAPSS) on July 3–4, 2020. This international forum brought together youth political leaders from across Asia to discuss emerging trends in student politics and youth engagement.

== Political career ==
=== Early activism and 2017 election ===
Silwal has been active in the alternative politics sphere since 2012–2013, involving himself in the early stages of the Bibeksheel Nepali movement. He formally entered electoral politics during the 2017 Nepalese general election, where he contested as a candidate for the House of Representatives from Lamjung District. In the 2017 election, Dev Prasad Gurung of the CPN (Maoist Centre) was elected from Lamjung.

=== Bibeksheel Nepali Dal leadership (2019–2021) ===
Following the Bibeksheel Sajha Party split on January 11, 2019, Silwal played a key role in reorganizing the Bibeksheel Nepali Dal. During the party's general convention held in Janakpur on October 17, 2019, Milan Pandey was elected as Chairman, and Silwal was elected as General Secretary (Mahamantri).

In his role as General Secretary, Silwal advocated for "virtuous politics" (Sanskritik Rajniti) and structural reforms within the party. He served in this capacity until November 2020. During this period, he was also recognized as a speaker on youth political participation, being identified as "Former President Society of Political Science Students, Nepal" at the IAPSS July 2020 event.

=== 2022 election and independent activism ===
Silwal contested again in Nepal's House of Representatives elections held on November 20, 2022, again from Lamjung District. In this election, Prithvi Subba Gurung of the CPN (UML) was elected from Lamjung.

Following internal shifts in the alternative political landscape after 2020, Silwal remained active as an independent political voice and commentator on Nepali politics.

=== Ministry of Youth and Sports (2024) ===
In March 2024, following the appointment of Biraj Bhakta Shrestha as Minister of Youth and Sports, Silwal was appointed as Chief Advisor to the Ministry. He served in this capacity from March 6, 2024, until the government changed in July 2024. During his tenure, Silwal was part of the core team responsible for policy formulation, focusing on sports governance reforms and youth engagement strategies. He worked closely with Minister Shrestha to address systemic issues within Nepal's sports administration, advocating for transparency and the depoliticization of sports bodies.

=== Ujyalo Nepal Party (2025) ===
In November 2025, Silwal formally joined the Ujyalo Nepal Party, a newly consolidated political force backed by Energy Minister Kulman Ghising. He was appointed as a Central Committee Member representing the party's technocratic and youth wing.

Silwal has publicly announced his intention to contest in upcoming legislative elections representing the Ujyalo Nepal Party, focusing his political platform on energy security, good governance, and evidence-based policymaking. According to reports, he has been engaged in discussions on political negotiations and power-sharing at the central committee level.

== Research and academic interests ==
Silwal maintains active profiles on multiple academic research platforms documenting his scholarly work and interests. His research interests encompass democratization, geopolitical dynamics, and civic space in South Asian contexts. His Academia.edu profile indicates over 312 followers and lists multiple research interests including Political Science, International Relations, Geopolitics, Democratization, and Civic Space.

== See also ==
Ujyalo Nepal Party

Kulman Ghising

Bibeksheel Nepali

2022 Nepalese general election

2017 Nepalese general election

Lamjung District

South Asian University

Tribhuvan University
