= Kathmandu 5 =

Parliamentary constituency in Nepal

- Parliamentary constituency for the House of Representatives
- Kathmandu 5 in Bagmati Province

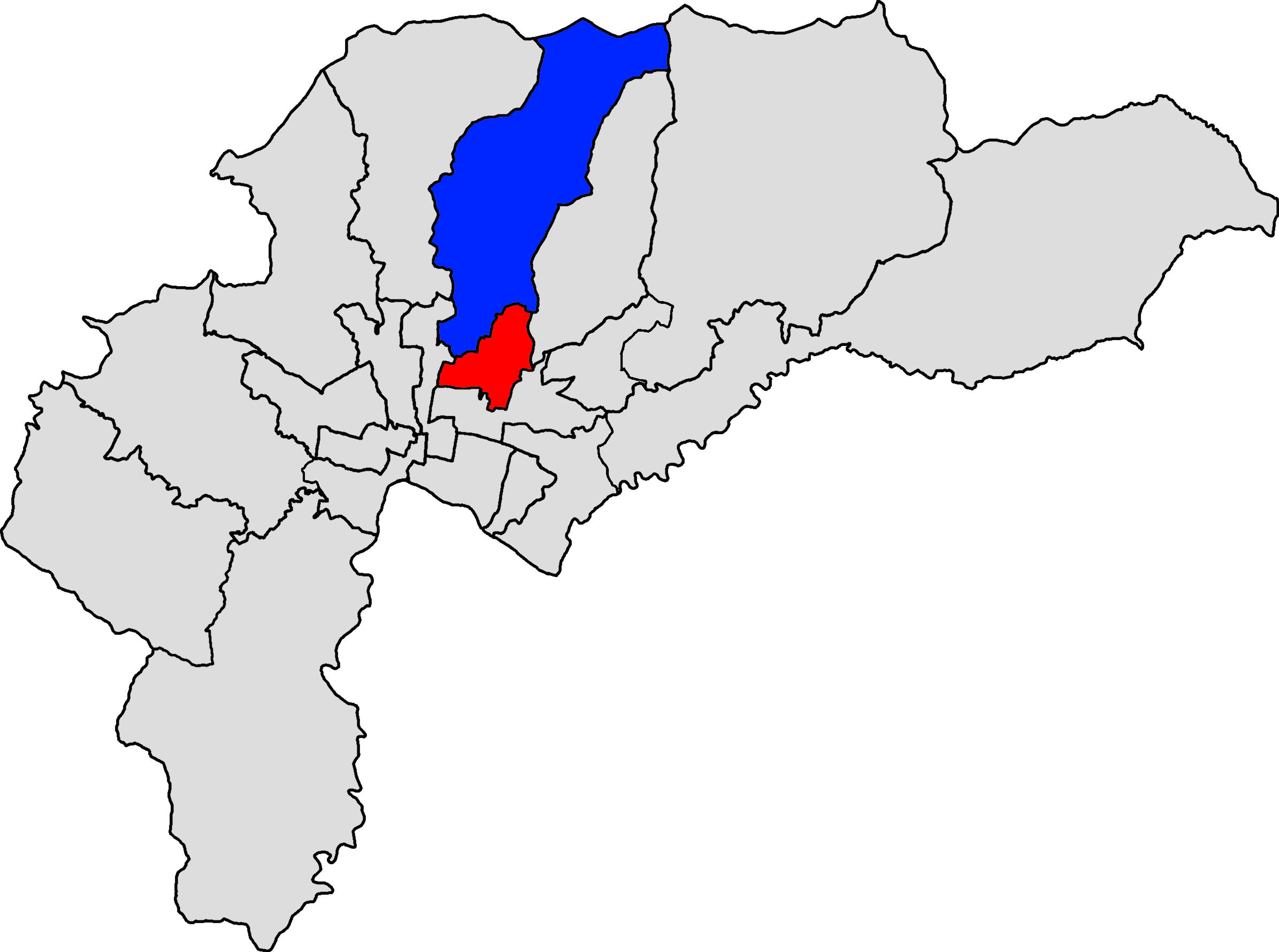
- Assembly segment Kathmandu 5(A) (red) and Kathmandu 5(B) (blue) within Kathmandu District
- Province: Bagmati Province
- District: Kathmandu District
- Electorate: 78,114

Current constituency
- Created: 1991
- Seats: 1
- Party: Rastriya Swatantra Party
- Member of Parliament: Sasmit Pokharel

Kathmandu 5 is one of 10 parliamentary constituencies of Kathmandu District in Nepal. This constituency came into existence on the Constituency Delimitation Commission (CDC) report submitted on 31 August 2017.

== Incorporated areas ==
Kathmandu 5 parliamentary constituency consists of wards 2, 3, 4, 5, of Kathmandu Metropolitan City, wards 3, 4, 5, 6, 7 of Budhanilkantha Municipality and wards 2, 3, 4, 5, 6, 7 of Tokha Municipality

== Assembly segments ==
It encompasses the following Bagmati Province Provincial Assembly segment

- Kathmandu 5(A)
- Kathmandu 5(B)

== Members of Parliament ==
=== Parliament/Constituent Assembly ===
Election	Member	Party
1991	Madan Bhandari	CPN (Unified Marxist-Leninist)
1992 by-election	Krishna Gopal Shrestha	CPN (Unified Marxist-Leninist)
1994	Rajendra Prasad Shrestha	CPN (Unified Marxist-Leninist)
March 1998	Rajendra Prasad Shrestha	CPN (Marxist-Leninist)
1999	Mangal Siddhi Manandhar	CPN (Unified Marxist-Leninist)
2008	Narahari Acharya	Nepali Congress
2017	Ishwar Pokhrel	CPN (Unified Marxist-Leninist)
May 2018	Ishwar Pokhrel	Nepal Communist Party
March 2021	Ishwar Pokhrel	CPN (Unified Marxist-Leninist)
2022	Pradip Paudel	Nepali Congress
2026	Sasmit Pokharel	Rastriya Swatantra Party

=== Provincial Assembly ===
==== 5(A) ====
Election	Member	Party
2017	Narayan Bahadur Silwal	CPN (Unified Marxist-Leninist)
May 2018	Narayan Bahadur Silwal	Nepal Communist Party

==== 5(B) ====
Election	Member	Party
2017	Dipak Niraula	CPN (Unified Marxist-Leninist)
May 2018	Dipak Niraula	Nepal Communist Party

== Election results ==
=== Election in the 2020s ===
==== 2026 general election ====
Candidate	Party	Votes	%
Sasmit Pokharel	Rastriya Swatantra Party	30,737	61.23
Pradip Paudel	Nepali Congress	9,159	18.24
Ishwor Pokharel	CPN (UML)	4,701	9.36
Kamal Thapa	Rastriya Prajatantra Party	1,922	3.83
Shreeram Gurung	Ujyaalo Nepal Party	1,228	2.45
Amit Thapa	Shram Sanskriti Party	769	1.53
Kalpana Sharma	Nepali Communist Party	574	1.14
Shova Lal Shrestha	Nepal Workers Peasants Party	574	1.14
Nisha Adhikari	Gatisheel Loktantrik Party	91	0.18
Others		448	0.89
Total		50,203	100.00
Valid votes		50,203	98.24
Invalid/blank votes		902	1.76
Total votes		51,105	100.00
Registered voters/turnout		78,114	65.42
Majority		21,578	
Rastriya Swatantra Party gain			

==== 2022 general election ====
Candidate	Party	Votes	%
Pradip Paudel	Nepali Congress	15,269	34.45
Ishwor Pokharel	CPN (UML)	10,190	22.99
Pranaya Shamsher Rana	Rastriya Swatantra Party	5,477	12.36
Ram Prasda Upreti	Rastriya Prajatantra Party	3,162	7.14
Shreeram Gurung	Independent	2,761	6.23
Hemraj Thapa	Independent	2,446	5.52
Sushant Shrestha	Independent	1,712	3.86
Shailesh Dangol	Nepal Workers Peasants Party	1,122	2.53
Others		2,177	4.91
Total		44,316	100.00
Majority		5,079	
Nepali Congress gain			

=== Election in the 2010s ===
==== 2017 legislative elections ====
Party	Candidate	Votes
CPN (Unified Marxist-Leninist)	Ishwar Pokhrel	23,029
Nepali Congress	Prakash Sharan Mahat	13,169
Bibeksheel Sajha Party	Ujwal Bahadur Thapa	6,853
Others		1,659
Invalid votes		1,154
Result	CPN (UML) gain	
Source: Election Commission

==== 2017 Nepalese provincial elections ====
===== Kathmandu 5(A) =====
Party	Candidate	Votes
CPN (Unified Marxist-Leninist)	Narayan Bahadur Silwal	7,790
Nepali Congress	Rama Paudyal	4,309
Bibeksheel Sajha Party	Ramhari Adhikari	4,021
Others		712
Invalid votes		338
Result	CPN (UML) gain	
Source: Election Commission

===== Kathmandu 5(B) =====
Party	Candidate	Votes
CPN (Unified Marxist-Leninist)	Dipak Niraula	13,879
Nepali Congress	Ramesh Kumar Khadka	9,524
Bibeksheel Sajha Party	Hari Krishna Shrestha	3,432
Others		1,300
Invalid votes		591
Result	CPN (UML) gain	
Source: Election Commission

==== 2013 Constituent Assembly election ====
Party	Candidate	Votes
Nepali Congress	Narahari Acharya	15,364
CPN (Unified Marxist-Leninist)	Ishwar Pokhrel	14,723
Rastriya Prajatantra Party Nepal	Raja Ram Shrestha	4,359
UCPN (Maoist)	Mahendra Kumar Shrestha	3,655
Independent	Ujwal Bahadur Thapa	1,163
Others		2,674
Result	Congress hold	
Source: Election Commission

=== Election in the 2000s ===
==== 2008 Constituent Assembly election ====
Party	Candidate	Votes
Nepali Congress	Narahari Acharya	13,245
CPN (Unified Marxist-Leninist)	Ishwar Pokhrel	9,120
CPN (Maoist)	Dipendra Prakash Maharjan	8,089
Rastriya Prajatantra Party Nepal	Kamal Thapa	3,925
CPN (Marxist–Leninist)	Daman Bahdur Khatri	1,022
Others		2,194
Invalid votes		1,389
Result	Congress gain	
Source: Election Commission

=== Election in the 1990s ===
==== 1999 legislative elections ====
Party	Candidate	Votes
CPN (Unified Marxist-Leninist)	Mangal Sidhhi Manandhar	14,303
CPN (Marxist–Leninist)	Rajendra Prasad Shrestha	8,565
Nepali Congress	Mukunda Regmi	8,248
Rastriya Prajatantra Party	Gyanu Lama	2,189
Others		1,284
Invalid Votes		1,206
Result	CPN (UML) hold	
Source: Election Commission

==== 1994 legislative elections ====
Party	Candidate	Votes
CPN (Unified Marxist-Leninist)	Rajendra Prasad Shrestha	19,312
Nepali Congress	Shyam Lal Shrestha	6,935
Rastriya Prajatantra Party	Purna Ratna Shakya	4,555
Others		1,799
Result	CPN (UML) hold	
Source: Election Commission

==== 1992 by-elections ====
Party	Candidate	Votes
CPN (Unified Marxist-Leninist)	Krishna Gopal Shrestha	21,253
Nepali Congress	Tiirtha Ram Dangol	15,926
Result	CPN (UML) hold	

==== 1991 legislative elections ====
Party	Candidate	Votes
CPN (Unified Marxist-Leninist)	Madan Bhandari	27,475
Nepali Congress	Hari Bol Bhattarai	18,928
Result	CPN (UML) gain	

== See also ==
- List of parliamentary constituencies of Nepal
