= Ishwar Pokhrel =

Nepali politician

Ishwor Pokharel
- ईश्वर पोखरेल
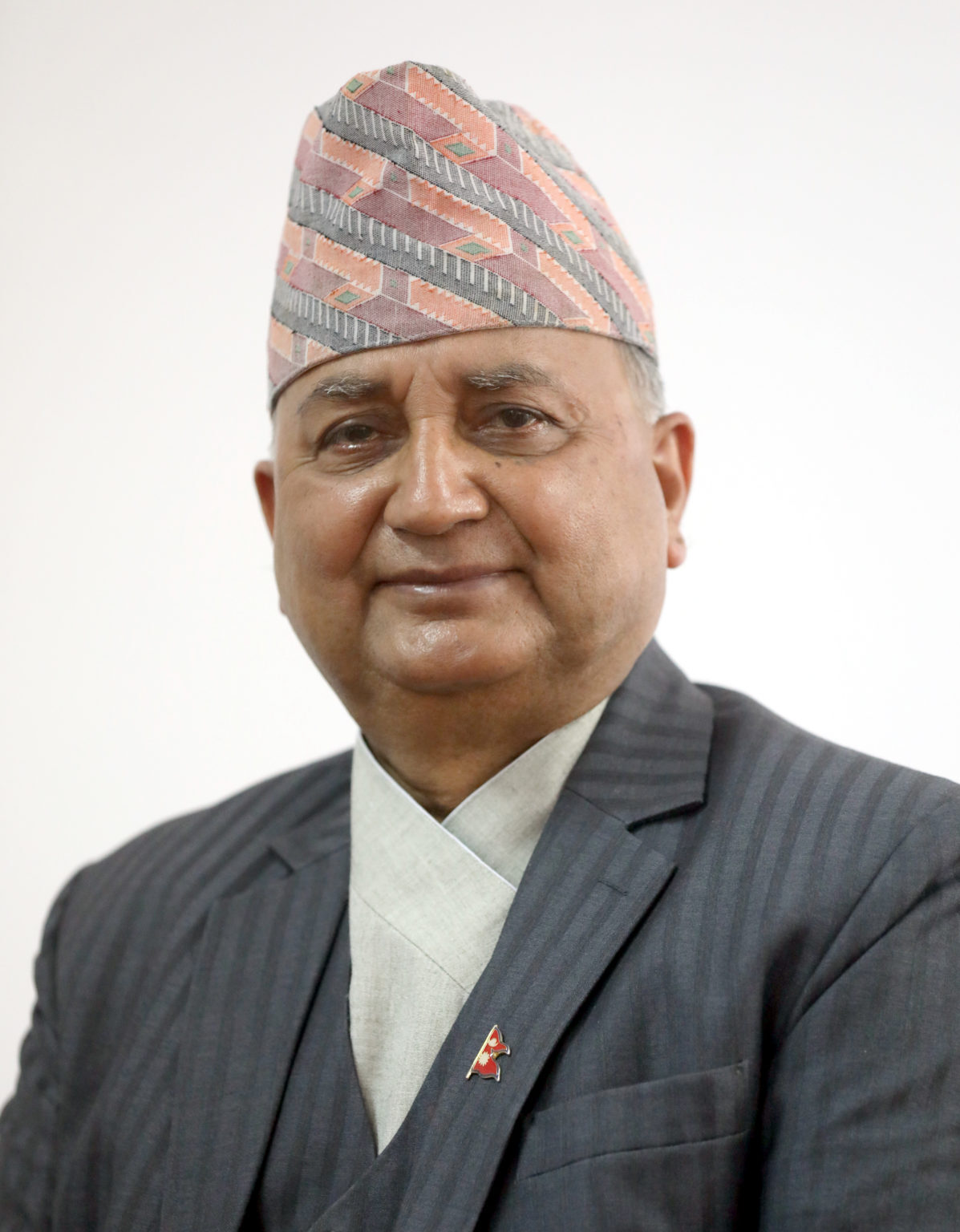
- Ishwar, 2021

Deputy Prime Minister of Nepal
- In office 1 June 2018 – 4 June 2021 Serving with Upendra Yadav (2018–19)
- President: Bidhya Devi Bhandari
- Prime Minister: Khadga Prasad Sharma Oli
- Preceded by: Bijay Kumar Gachhadar Krishna Bahadur Mahara Gopal Man Shrestha (June 2017); Kamal Thapa (October 2017 )
- Succeeded by: Bishnu Prasad PaudelRaghubir Mahaseth; Rajendra Mahato
- In office 16 May 2012 – 29 May 20012 Serving with Bijay Kumar Gachhadar, Narayan Kaji Shrestha and Krishna Prasad Sitaula
- President: Ram Baran Yadav
- Prime Minister: Baburam Gautam
- Succeeded by: Prakash Man Singh (2014) (Note: There was no deputy prime minister from 14 March 2013 until 25 February 2014.); Bam Dev Gautam (2014)
Ministerial offices
Minister in the Office of the Prime Minister and Council of Ministers of Nepal
In office 14 October 2020 – 4 June 2021
President	Bidhya Devi Bhandari
Prime Minister	Khadga Prasad Sharma Oli
Preceded by	Position established
Succeeded by	Position abolished
Minister of Defence of Nepal
In office 26 February 2018 – 14 October 2020
President	Bidhya Devi Bhandari
Prime Minister	Khadga Prasad Sharma Oli
Preceded by	Bhimsen Das Pradhan
Succeeded by	Minendra Rijal
Minister of Foreign Affairs of Nepal
In office 16 May 2012 – 29 May 2012
President	Ram Baran Yadav
Prime Minister	Baburam Bhattarai
Preceded by	Narayan Kaji Shrestha
Succeeded by	Narayan Kaji Shrestha
Minister of Agriculture Development of Nepal
In office 16 May 2012 – 29 May 2012
President	Ram Baran Yadav
Prime Minister	Baburam Bhattarai
Preceded by	Nandan Kumar Dutta
Succeeded by	Tek Bahadur Thapa
Ministry of Youth and Sports of Nepal
In office 16 May 2012 – 29 May 2012
President	Ram Baran Yadav
Prime Minister	Baburam Bhattarai
Preceded by	Kamala Roka
Succeeded by	Ram Kumar Shrestha
Minister of Industry, Commerce and Supplies of Nepal
In office 5 July 2004 – 1 February 2005
Monarch	Gyanendra of Nepal
Prime Minister	Sher Bahadur Deuba
Preceded by	Bimalendra Nidhi
Other senior positions
Senior Chairman of the Communist Party of Nepal (Unified Marxist–Leninist)
Incumbent
Assumed office 30 November 2021
Preceded by	Position established
General Secretary of the Communist Party of Nepal (Unified Marxist–Leninist)
In office 8 March 2021 – 30 November 2021
Preceded by	Position established (Party revived as per a Supreme Court verdict)
Succeeded by	Shankar Pokharel
In office 2 March 2009 – 17 May 2018
Preceded by	Jhala Nath Khanal
Succeeded by	Position abolished
Parliamentary offices
Member of Parliament, Pratinidhi Sabha
In office 4 March 2018 – 18 September 2022
Preceded by	Narahari Acharya
Succeeded by	Pradip Paudel
Constituency	Kathmandu 5
In office 18 June 1999 – April 2008
Preceded by	Man Mohan Adhikari
Succeeded by	Chakra Bahadur Thakuri (as member of the 1st Constituent Assembly)
Constituency	Kathmandu 3
Member of Parliament, Rastriya Sabha
In office 27 June 1997 – 3 June 1999

Personal details
- Born: 4 February 1954 (age 72) Mamkha, Okhaldhunga
- Party: CPN (Unified Marxist–Leninist) (before 1990; 2021–present)
- Other political affiliations: Nepal Communist Party (2018-2021))
- Education: Tribhuvan University
- Website: www.ishwarpokhrel.com

Ishwor Pokhrel (Nepali: ईश्वर पोखरेल) is the current senior Vice-president of CPN (UML). Pokhrel has also served as the Deputy Prime Minister of Nepal. He was also Minister of Defence in the Second Oli cabinet.

He also served as Minister for Industry, Commerce and Supplies. He was also Minister of Foreign Affairs from 20 May 2012 to 28 May 2012.

Pokhrel, publicly supported former President Bidya Devi Bhandari's decision to return to active politics. Speaking at an event commemorating her late husband Madan Bhandari, he praised her reengagement and criticized the current party leadership for resisting her return. Pokhrel described Bhandari's activism as unsurprising, given her longstanding role within the party, and encouraged moving beyond debates over her suitability for reentry. At a separate event covered by a national news agency, Pokhrel emphasized that her return should not be narrowly theorized, arguing that her political background and faith in politics warranted a broader and more inclusive view.

== Published books ==
'MAGH 19' (A book written about February 1 - The Royal take-over, 2005)

== Electoral history ==
=== 2022 Nepalese general election ===
Candidate	Party	Votes	%
Pradip Paudel	Nepali Congress	15,269	34.45
Ishwor Pokharel	CPN (UML)	10,190	22.99
Pranaya Shamsher Rana	Rastriya Swatantra Party	5,477	12.36
Ram Prasda Upreti	Rastriya Prajatantra Party	3,162	7.14
Shreeram Gurung	Independent	2,761	6.23
Hemraj Thapa	Independent	2,446	5.52
Sushant Shrestha	Independent	1,712	3.86
Shailesh Dangol	Nepal Workers Peasants Party	1,122	2.53
Others		2,177	4.91
Total		44,316	100.00
Majority		5,079	
Nepali Congress gain			

=== 2017 legislative elections ===
Kathmandu 5
Party	Candidate	Votes
CPN (Unified Marxist-Leninist)	Ishwar Pokhrel	23,029
Nepali Congress	Prakash Sharan Mahat	13,169
Bibeksheel Sajha Party	Ujwal Bahadur Thapa	6,853
Others		1,659
Invalid votes		1,154
Result	CPN (UML) gain	
Source: Election Commission

=== 2013 Constituent Assembly election ===
Kathamndu 5
Party	Candidate	Votes
Nepali Congress	Narahari Acharya	15,364
CPN (Unified Marxist-Leninist)	Ishwar Pokhrel	14,723
Rastriya Prajatantra Party Nepal	Raja Ram Shrestha	4,359
UCPN (Maoist)	Mahendra Kumar Shrestha	3,655
Independent	Ujwal Bahadur Thapa	1,163
Others		2,674
Result	Congress hold	
Source: Election Commission

=== 2008 Constituent Assembly election ===
Kathmandu 5
Party	Candidate	Votes
Nepali Congress	Narahari Acharya	13,245
CPN (Unified Marxist-Leninist)	Ishwar Pokhrel	9,120
CPN (Maoist)	Dipendra Prakash Maharjan	8,089
Rastriya Prajatantra Party Nepal	Kamal Thapa	3,925
CPN (Marxist–Leninist)	Daman Bahdur Khatri	1,022
Others		2,194
Invalid votes		1,389
Result	Congress gain	
Source: Election Commission

=== 1991 legislative elections ===
Dhanusha 3
Party	Candidate	Votes
Nepali Congress	Ananda Prasad Dhungana	20,877
CPN (Unified Marxist–Leninist)	Ishwar Pokhrel	14,311
Result	Congress gain	

== See also ==
- 11th general convention of Communist Party of Nepal (Unified Marxist–Leninist)
