= Rabindra Mishra =

Nepalese politician (born 1965)

- रवीन्द्र मिश्र

Senior Deputy Chairman of Rastriya Prajatantra Party
- Incumbent
- Assumed office 28 September 2022
- Preceded by: Position created

President of Bibeksheel Sajha Party
- In office 26 July 2017 – 25 May 2022
- Preceded by: Position created
- Succeeded by: Samikchya Baskota

Head of BBC Nepali Service
- In office 2006–2017

Personal details
- Born: 3 July 1965 (age 61) Kathmandu, Nepal
- Party: Rastriya Prajatantra Party (2022 – present)
- Other political affiliations: Bibeksheel Sajha Party (2017 – 2022); Sajha Party (2017)
- Education: Tribhuwan University; University of the Punjab; University of London
- Occupation: Philanthropist, ex-Journalist, Writer, Poet, Politician
- Website: rabindramishra.com

Rabindra Mishra (Nepali: रवीन्द्र मिश्र) is a Nepali philanthropist, ex-journalist, writer, poet, and politician. Currently, Mishra is the Senior Vice-chairman of Rastriya Prajatantra Party, after having resigned as a general member of Bibeksheel Sajha Party in September 2022.

He earlier resigned as the national president of Bibeksheel Sajha Party in May 2022. He formerly worked as the editor-in-chief of BBC Nepali Service, and left the BBC in February 2017 to enter Nepalese politics. Mishra is also the founder of the global charity, Help Nepal Network, which has chapters in 14 countries and is run entirely by volunteers.

== Education ==
Mishra received his Master's Degree in English Literature from Tribhuvan University. He then went to University of the Punjab, Pakistan, earning a Master's Degree in journalism. He joined University of London and majored in International Politics.

== Career ==
Mishra worked with Nepal Television and Pakistan's leading English-language daily, The News International. He joined the BBC World Service in 1995 as a producer with BBC Nepali Service. Later he worked on English-language flagship programmes, including World Today and Newshour. He was appointed as the chief editor of BBC Nepali Service in 2006.

== Political career ==
On 28 February 2017, Mishra resigned from BBC Nepali to enter politics. He stated that the reason behind his move was to "create a common platform to bring together honest and capable Nepalis from all walks of life for the sake of clean politics to transform Nepal."

The next day, on March 1, Mishra approached the Election Commission with an application to secure the name Sajha Party (Nepali: साझा पार्टी, lit. 'Common Party') and a weighing scale as the symbol of his yet-to-be formed political party.

Mishra ran against Nepali Congress leader Prakash Man Singh in the 2017 legislative elections from Kathmandu 1, but was defeated by a margin of 818 votes.

Rabindra Mishra joined the Rastriya Prajatantra Party in September 2022 before the 2022 Nepalese general election. Mishra raced for the second time against Nepali Congress leader Prakash Man Singh in the 2022 election from Kathmandu 1, but got defeated by a narrow margin of 125 votes.

== Electoral history ==
=== 2026 legislative elections ===
Kathmandu 1
Party	Candidate	Votes
Rastriya Swatantra Party	Ranju Darshana	15,455
Nepali Congress	Prabal Thapa Chhetri	6,364
Rastriya Prajatantra Party	Rabindra Mishra	3,972
CPN (UML)	Mohan Raj Regmi	1,618
Others		1,673
Invalid votes		434
Result	Rastriya Swatantra Party gain	

=== 2022 legislative elections ===
Kathmandu 1
Party	Candidate	Votes
Nepali Congress	Prakash Man Singh	7,143
Rastriya Prajatantra Party	Rabindra Mishra	7,018
Rastriya Swatantra Party	Pukar Bam	4,115
Others		Shared by CPN-UML and others
Invalid votes		(Invalid Data by ECN)
Result	Congress hold	
Source: Election Commission

=== 2017 legislative elections ===
Kathmandu 1
Party	Candidate	Votes
Nepali Congress	Prakash Man Singh	10,936
Bibeksheel Sajha Party	Rabindra Mishra	10,118
CPN (Maoist Centre)	Anil Sharma	5,336
Others		1,292
Invalid votes		593
Result	Congress hold	
Source: Election Commission

== Books ==
- भूमध्यरेखा, (Bhumadhyarekha), Fineprint (2010)
- खान पुगोस, दिन पुगोस, (Khana Pugos, Dina Pugos), Nepalaya Publication (2012)
- रबिन्द्र मिश्रका कविता, (Rabindra Mishra Ka Kabita), (2015)

== Filmography ==
- Highway as Doctor

== See also ==
- Rastriya Prajatantra Party
- Bibeksheel Sajha Party
- Sajha Party
- Bibeksheel Nepali
