= Narahari Acharya =

Nepalese politician

- नरहरि आचार्य

Ministry of Law, Justice and Constituent Assembly
- In office 25 February 2014 – 12 October 2015
- President: Ram Baran Yadav
- Prime Minister: Sushil Koirala
- Vice President: Paramananda Jha
- Preceded by: Hari Prasad Neupane
- Succeeded by: Angi Kharel

Member of 1st and 2nd Nepalese Constituent Assembly
- In office 2008–2017
- Constituency: Kathmandu 5

Personal details
- Born: 27 September 1953 (age 72) Kathmandu
- Party: Nepali Congress
- Parents: Umanath Acharya; Rewati Acharya
- Website: narahariacharya.com

Narahari Acharya, (Nepali:नरहरि आचार्य) a central member of Nepali Congress, assumed the post of the Minister of Law, Justice, Constituent Assembly, Parliamentary Affairs and Peace and Reconstruction on 25 February 2014 under Sushil Koirala-led government.

He is a member of the 2nd Nepalese Constituent Assembly. He won the Kathmandu–5 seat in 2013 Nepalese Constituent Assembly election from the Nepali Congress.

== Personal life ==
Narahari Acharya was born on 27 September 1953 in Bisharnagar, Kathmandu, Nepal to Umanath Acharya and Rewati Acharya. He holds a Master's Degree in Humanities and has taught for 16 years at the Tribhuvan University. He is married to the writer Sharada Sharma and has two daughters.

== Political career ==
Acharya involved in politics joining Nepali Congress in 1968 though he only took the party membership in 1997. He became a member of the National Assembly in 1992 and was appointed as Minister for Law, Justice, Constituent Assembly and Parliamentary Affairs.

He won the 2008 Nepalese Constituent Assembly election from Kathmandu 5 constituency with 13,245 votes defeating CPN (UML) general secretary Ishwor Pokhrel who had received 9,120 votes. He was also jailed for 1 year in course of his political activities.

== Electoral history ==
=== 2013 Constituent Assembly election ===
Kathamndu 5
Party	Candidate	Votes
Nepali Congress	Narahari Acharya	15,364
CPN (Unified Marxist-Leninist)	Ishwar Pokhrel	14,723
Rastriya Prajatantra Party Nepal	Raja Ram Shrestha	4,359
UCPN (Maoist)	Mahendra Kumar Shrestha	3,655
Independent	Ujwal Bahadur Thapa	1,163
Others		2,674
Result	Congress hold	
Source: Election Commission

=== 2008 Constituent Assembly election ===
Kathmandu 5
Party	Candidate	Votes
Nepali Congress	Narahari Acharya	13,245
CPN (Unified Marxist-Leninist)	Ishwar Pokhrel	9,120
CPN (Maoist)	Dipendra Prakash Maharjan	8,089
Rastriya Prajatantra Party Nepal	Kamal Thapa	3,925
CPN (Marxist–Leninist)	Daman Bahdur Khatri	1,022
Others		2,194
Invalid votes		1,389
Result	Congress gain	
Source: Election Commission
