= 2017 Lalitpur municipal election =

Local election in Nepal

2017 Lalitpur municipal elections
- 14 May 2017

147 seats to Lalitpur Metropolitan City Council 74 seats needed for a majority

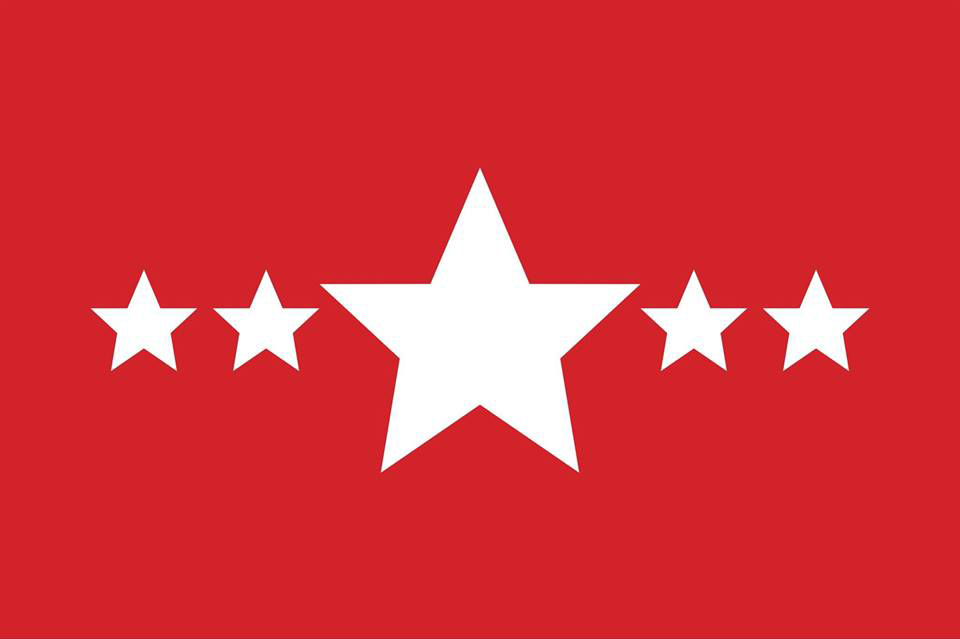
	First party	Second party	Third party
Party	Nepali Congress	CPN (UML)	Maoist Centre
Seats won	44	65	10
Percentage	27.62%	27.26%	11.95%
	Fourth party
Party	Naya Shakti
Seats won	1
Percentage	0.7%
Council control after election
Nepali Congress
Chiri Babu Maharjan
Elected Mayor

Municipal election for Lalitpur, the third largest city in Nepal, was held on May 14, 2017 for the post of Mayor, Deputy Mayor, Ward Chairmen and Ward Members. All posts were elected by First past the post method; with all having a tenure of 5 years.

== Background ==
Elections were last held in 2006 and since then the city has been without an elected executive. With the passing of a new constitution, a commission was formed to restructure the existing local levels into more powerful and autonomous local bodies. With the addition of Wards 1 to 13 of Karyabinayak municipality, the city was upgraded from sub-metropolitan to metropolitan city with 29 wards. Electors in each ward will elect a ward chairman and 4 ward members. Out of 4 ward members, 2 must be female and one of the 2 females must belong to the Dalit community.

== Results ==
Summary of Lalitpur mayoral election, 2017
Party	Candidate	Votes	%
Nepali Congress	Chiri Babu Maharjan	24,642	27.62
CPN (Unified Marxist–Leninist)	Hari Krishna Byanjankar	24,316	27.26
Independent	Ramesh Maharjan	13,458	15.09
CPN (Maoist Centre)	Dinesh Maharjan	10,661	11.95
Others		2,037	2.28
Invalid/blank votes		14,100	15.80
Total		89,214	100
Registered voters/turnout		112,923	79.00

Summary of Lalitpur deputy-mayoral election, 2017
Party	Candidate	Votes	%
Nepali Congress	Gita Satyal	19,819	22.22
Independent	Shova Shakya	14,240	15.96
CPN (Maoist Centre)	Hasina Shakya	12,979	14.55
Rastriya Prajatantra Party	Babu Kaji Pradhan	10,540	11.81
Naya Shakti	Sajani Maharjan	1,380	1.55
Others		860	0.96
Invalid/blank votes		29,396	32.95
Total		89,214	100
Registered voters/turnout		112,923	79.00

== Ward results ==
Summary of Party wise Ward chairman and Ward member seats won, 2017
Party	Chairman	Members
CPN (Unified Marxist–Leninist)	14	62
Nepali Congress	10	32
CPN (Maoist Centre)	4	10
Independent	1	0
Naya Shakti	0	1
Total	29	105

4 candidates (3 from CPN-UML and 1 from Naya Shakti) for Ward Members were elected unopposed under Dalit woman reserved seats. 11 ward member seats reserved for Dalit women were left unfilled due to lack of candidates.
