= Surya Raj Acharya =

Nepali politician and academic

- सूर्यराज आचार्य
- Education: PhD in Infrastructure and Regional Development
- Occupations: politician; academic
- Political party: Sajha Party (before 2020)
- Website: www.acharyasurya.com.np

Surya Raj Acharya is a Nepalese politician, and a public intellectual as an independent expert in development and infrastructure policy. He was a visiting professor at Institute of Engineering, Tribhuvan University before joining Sajha Party. He was spokesperson of Sajha Party. Acharya lives in Bharatpur Metropolis in Chitwan District, Nepal.

== Education ==
Acharya has a Bachelor in civil engineering from the National School of Technology in Jamshedpur, India. He has a master's degree in resource management from the Asian Institute of Technology. He holds a PhD degree in infrastructure and regional development from the University of Tokyo, Japan.

== Career ==
In early career phase, he worked as an engineer under the Nepal's Civil Service. He has worked a long time with the Institute of Transport Policies Studies in Japan as Senior Fellow. He has also worked as a Visiting Faculty for Tokyo University, Japan. He was visiting professor at the Institute of Engineering before being affiliated in Politics. Acharya was 'Adjunct Professor' at the National Graduate Institute of Policy Studies (GRIPS).

== Political career ==
Acharya was one of the key founding leaders of Sajha Party. He was the Spokesperson and Chief of Policy Department of the Party. He contested the 2017 Nepalese legislative election from Kathmandu-2 constituency, where he was defeated by Madhav Kumar Nepal. He left the party after major differences with the Party Coordinator in some key strategic and policy matters.

== Articles and publications ==
- Dr. Acharya has many academic publications including an edited book titled 'Transport Development in Asian Megacities: A New Perspective'.
- Motorization and urban mobility in developing countries exploring policy options through dynamic simulation.
- Sustainable transport development in Nepal: challenges, opportunities and strategies.
- Specialties of Asian Megacities.

== See also ==
- Rabindra Mishra
