= 11th general convention of Communist Party of Nepal (Unified Marxist–Leninist) =

11th General convention of Communist Party of Nepal (Unified Marxist–Leninist)
- 14–16 December 2025
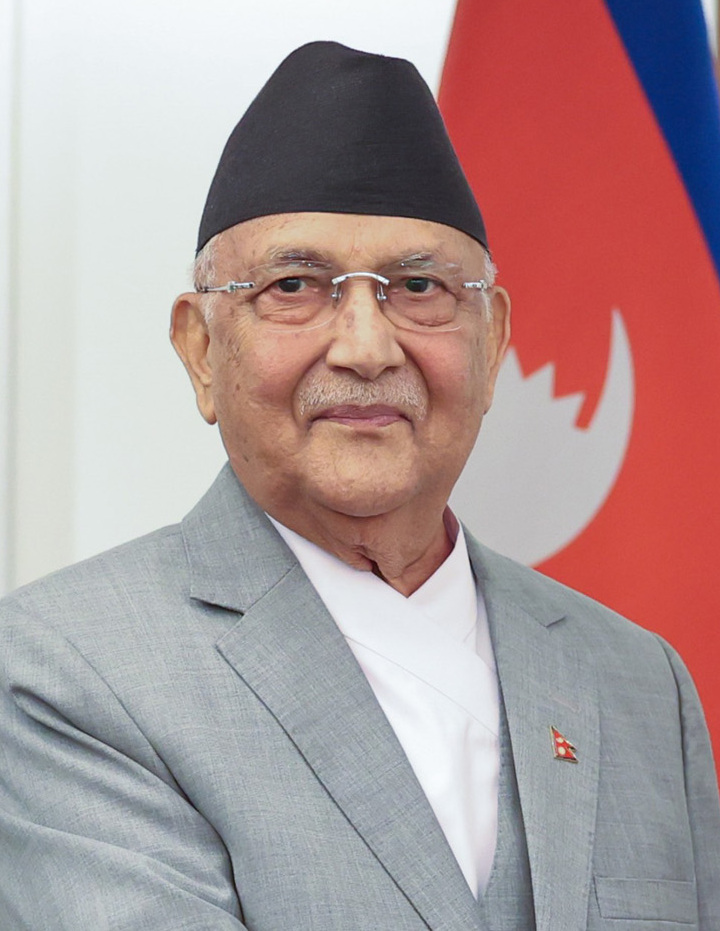

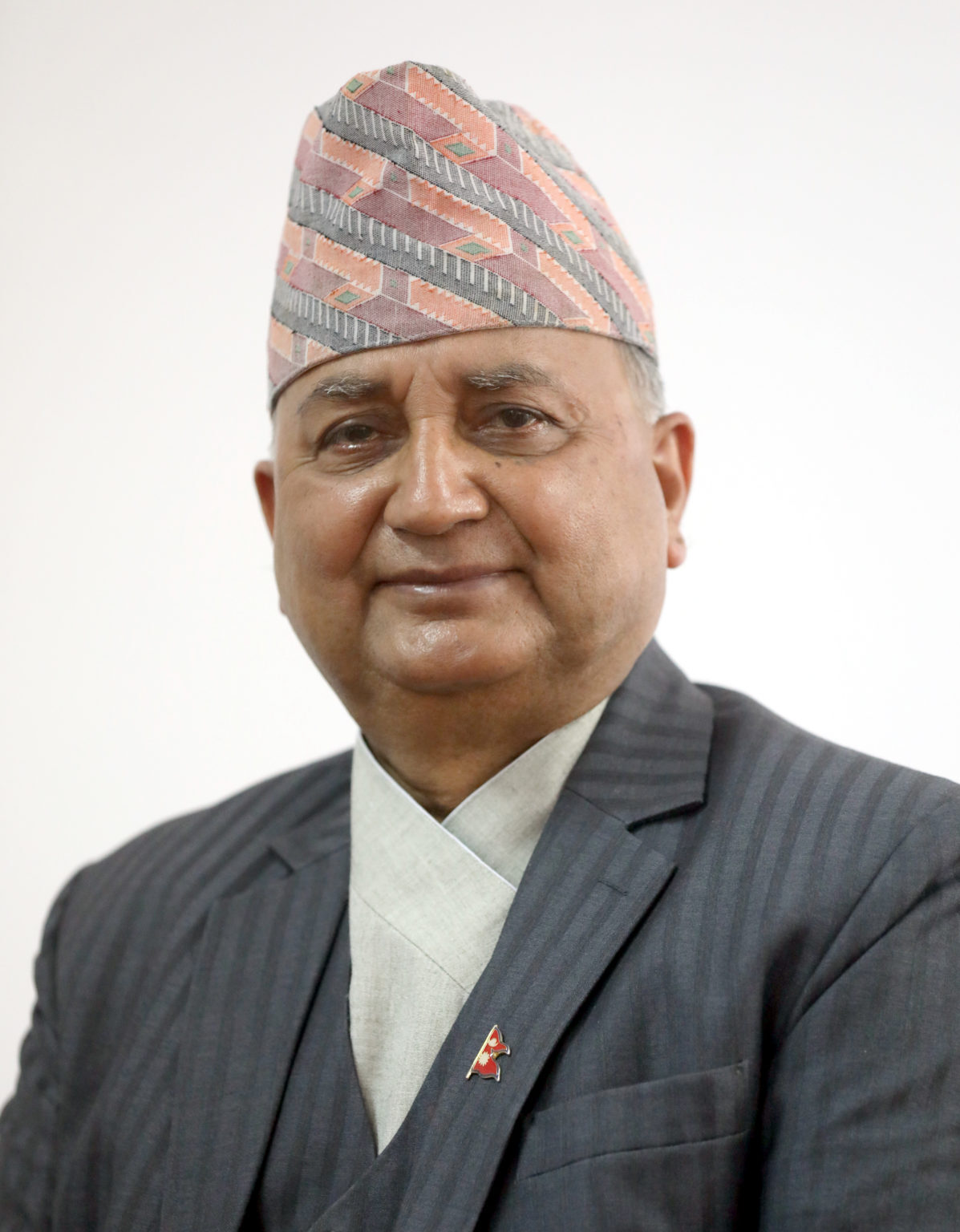
Candidate	K. P. Sharma Oli	Ishwor Pokharel
Delegate count	1,663	564
Percentage	74.7%	25.3%
Chairman before election
K. P. Sharma Oli
Elected Chairman
K. P. Sharma Oli

The 11th general convention of Communist Party of Nepal (Unified Marxist–Leninist) was held from 14–16 December 2025 to elect central committee members and portfolios. It is held in Sallaghari, Bhaktapur District of Nepal. A total of 2,200 delegates were elected as well as nominated to elect the party central structure including 15 portfolios and 251 central committee members.

== Elected portfolios ==
S.N	Name	Votes	Result	Panel	Reference
Chairperson (1)
1.	K. P. Sharma Oli	1,663	Elected	Oli	
2.	Ishwar Pokhrel	564	Defeated	Pokhrel	
Vice Chairperson (5)
1.	Prithvi Subba Gurung	1,737	Elected	Oli	
2.	Bishnu Prasad Paudel	1,675	Elected	Oli	
3.	Ram Bahadur Thapa	1,516	Elected	Oli	
4.	Gokarna Bista	1,368	Elected	Pokhrel	
5.	Raghuji Pant	1,258	Elected	Oli	
6.	Guru Baral	1,137	Defeated	Oli	
7.	Binda Pandey	358	Defeated	Pokhrel	
8.	Parshuram Megi Gurung	461	Defeated	Pokhrel	
9.	Arun Nepal	439	Defeated	Pokhrel	
10.	Tanka Prasad Karki	358	Defeated	Pokhrel	
11.	Bhim Acharya	265	Defeated	Independent	
General Secretary (1)
1.	Shankar Pokharel	1,228	Elected	Oli	
2.	Surendra Pandey	999	Defeated	Pokhrel	
Deputy general secretary (3)
1.	Lekh Raj Bhatta	1,452	Elected	Oli	
2.	Raghubir Mahaseth	1,368	Elected	Oli	
3.	Yogesh Bhattarai	1,348	Elected	Pokhrel	
4.	Bishnu Rimal	1,092	Defeated	Oli	
5.	Aananda Pokharel	635	Defeated	Pokhrel	
6.	Baijanath Chaudhary	597	Defeated	Pokhrel	
Secretary (9)
1.	Mahesh Basnet	1,544	Elected		
2.	Padma Kumari Aryal	1,530	Elected	Oli	
3.	Chhabilal Bishwakarma	1,506	Elected	Oli	
4.	Sher Dhan Rai	1,503	Elected	Oli	
5.	Hikmat Kumar Karki	1,337	Elected	Oli	
6.	Khagaraj Adhikari	1,331	Elected	Oli	
7.	Yam Lal Kandel	1,185	Elected	Oli	
8.	Rajan Bhattarai	1,181	Elected	Oli	
9.	Bhanu Bhakta Dhakal	1,108	Elected	Oli	
10.	Gokul Prasad Baskota	1,030	Defeated	Pokhrel	
11.	Thakur Prasad Gaire	883	Defeated	Pokhrel	
12.	Rachana Khadka	877	Defeated	Pokhrel	
13.	Karna Bahadur Thapa	847	Defeated	Pokhrel	
14.	Lal Babu Pandit	796	Defeated	Independent	
15.	Agni Prasad Kharel	716	Defeated	Pokhrel	
16.	Binod Dhakal	684	Defeated	Pokhrel	
17.	Krishna Gopal Shrestha	625	Defeated	Pokhrel	
18.	Pemba Lama	493	Defeated	Independent	
19.	Purusottam Poudel	462	Defeated	Pokhrel	
20.	Indra Lal Sapkota	405	Defeated	Pokhrel	
