= Ranju Darshana =

Nepalese politician and social activist

- रन्‍जु दर्शना
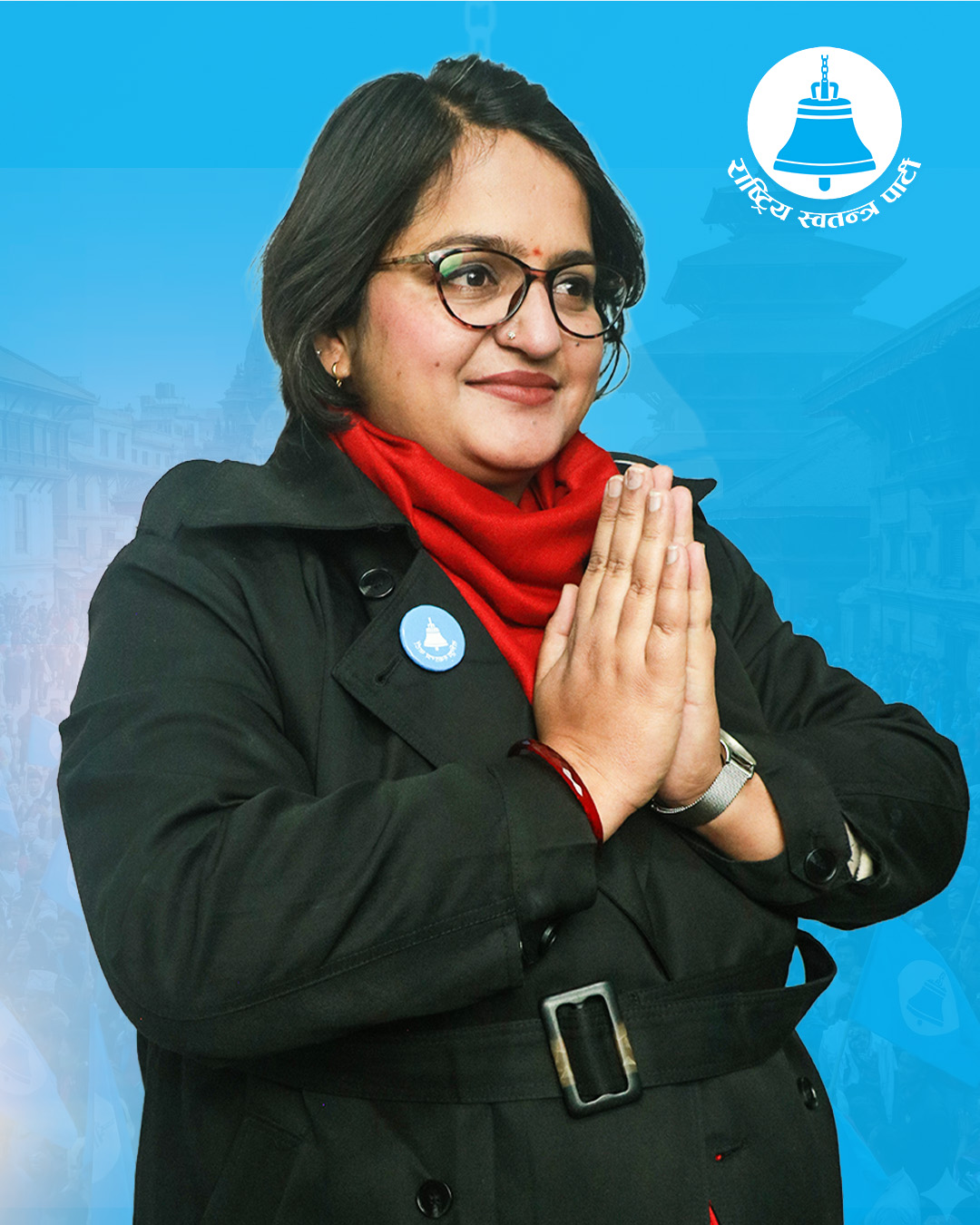

Member of Parliament, Pratinidhi Sabha
- Incumbent
- Assumed office 26 March 2026
- Preceded by: Prakash Man Singh
- Constituency: Kathmandu 1

Personal details
- Born: Ranju Neupane; 3 March 1996 (age 30) Kathmandu, Nepal
- Party: Rastriya Swatantra Party (2025 – present)
- Other political affiliations: Bibeksheel Nepali (2014-2021) Bibeksheel Sajha Party (2022 – 2025)
- Spouse: Kishu Kuikel (m. 2022)
- Education: National College
- Occupation: Scholar, Activist, Politician
- Known for: Candidacy for mayor of Kathmandu Metropolis at age 21
- Website: ranjudarshana.com

Ranju Neupane (Note: Nepali: रन्जु न्यौपाने) (born 3 March 1996), better known as Ranju Darshana, is a Nepalese politician and youth activist who is the former general secretary of Bibeksheel Sajha Party and an elected member of parliament from Kathmandu-1 constituency in the 2026 Nepalese general election as a candidate of Rastriya Swatantra Party. She became an iconic person after her candidacy for the mayor of Kathmandu Metropolitan City in the 2017 Nepalese local elections. Darshana was a central committee member and media coordinator of Bibeksheel Nepali and was elected as a central member by the first general convention of the party in late 2015.

Darshana entered into the politics from activism against Nepal Banda or conditional national strike. She was active in the rescue activities during the April 2015 Nepal earthquake. She has mobilized youths in peaceful protest against corruption, especially in the medical sector reform drive of Dr. Govinda K.C.

== Political life ==
Darshana, who had raised the slogan of "Kathmandu the most beautiful city in the world" for this election drive, secured third position with 23,439 votes. Bidya Sundar Shakya, a candidate from the Communist Party of Nepal (Unified Marxist–Leninist), was elected with 64,913 votes in the 2017 Nepalese local elections.

Darshana committed to keep working in the social field to correct the politics of society, even after being defeated in the mayoral election.

== Entry into Politics ==
=== The Citizenship Incident ===
Darshana's political awakening was triggered by a deeply personal experience with Nepal's bureaucratic system. When attempting to obtain her citizenship certificate through her mother's name—a right legally guaranteed but rarely implemented smoothly—she encountered significant resistance from male government officials who questioned and delayed her application due to her mother's single status. This experience proved transformative. Darshana realized that the presence of empathetic female officials in such offices could fundamentally change how citizens experience government services. She asked herself: "Why can't I be that woman who comprehends, empathizes, and advocates for the rights of others facing similar obstacles?" This question sparked her determination to enter politics and combat systemic gender biases.

=== Joining Bibeksheel Nepali (2013) ===
In 2013, at the age of 17, Darshana discovered Bibeksheel Nepali Party through their "Nepal Khulla Chha" (Nepal is Open) campaign, which protested against frequent nationwide strikes (bandhs) that disrupted daily life. While roaming her neighborhood, she found a card with a smiley face and the party's name. Researching online, she found the party's slogan "Raise your voice against banda" resonated with her frustrations about political disruptions to public life The following day, she participated in an anti-banda campaign at Chakrapath, marking the beginning of her political activism. She was drawn to Bibeksheel Nepali's non-violent stance and its approach to politics that prioritized public convenience over disruptive tactics.

=== Early Activism and Party Roles ===
Between 2013 and 2017, Darshana rapidly ascended within the Bibeksheel Nepali Party structure:

- 2013–2015: Active member in anti-bandh campaigns and social service initiatives
- 2015: Elected as Central Committee Member at the party's first general convention in December 2015
- 2015: Appointed Media Department Chief and Kathmandu District Executive Wing head (served until December 2015)
- 2015 Earthquake Response: Coordinated relief efforts as Kathmandu District Relief Coordinator and spokesperson for earthquake rapid response teams
- 2016–2017: Led public awareness campaigns against slow post-earthquake reconstruction and supported Dr. Govinda K.C.'s anti-corruption hunger strikes in the medical education sector

During this period, Darshana also engaged in creative activism, performing street plays in Nepalgunj to raise awareness against the dowry system. She became known for her oratory skills and ability to mobilize youth for peaceful protests

== Pregnancy During Election Campaign 2026 Election ==
During the 2026 Nepalese general election, Ranju Darshana drew widespread public attention for actively campaigning while in the late stages of pregnancy. She was approximately eight months pregnant when she began her door-to-door campaign in Kathmandu Constituency No. 1. Despite physical challenges, Darshana continued her campaign activities, including public interactions, meetings, and outreach programs. Her campaign was supported by family members, particularly her husband, who assisted with logistics and mobility. In February 2026, shortly before the election, she gave birth to her first child. Within days, images circulated in national media showing her participating in the voting process while carrying her newborn. These visuals became widely symbolic of resilience and commitment to public service. Her participation in the election during pregnancy was noted by observers as a rare instance in Nepali politics and contributed to public discourse on gender roles, workplace inclusion, and the structural challenges faced by women in leadership positions.

== Electoral history ==
=== Local Election 2017 – Kathmandu Mayor ===
Candidate	Party	Votes
Bidya Sundar Shakya	CPN-UML	64,913
Raju Raj Joshi	Nepali Congress	45,269
Ranju Darshana	Bibeksheel Nepali	23,439

=== General Election 2082 – Kathmandu-5 ===
S.N.	Candidate Name	Party	Votes
1	Pradip Poudel	Nepali Congress	15,237
2	Ishwor Pokhrel	CPN UML	10,175
3	Dr. Pranaya Shemser Rana	Rastriya Swatantra Party	5,473
4	Ram Prasad Upreti	Rastriya Prajatantra Party	3,155
5	Shree Ram Gurung	Independent	2,761
6	Hemraj Thapa	Independent	2,440
7	Sushant Shrestha	Independent	1,711
8	Sailesh Dandol	Nepal Workers and Peasants Party	1,122
9	Ranju Neupane	Independent	600
10	Madhu Sudhan Pathak	Hamro Nepali Party	364

=== General Election 2026 – Kathmandu-1 ===
Candidate	Party	Votes
Ranju Darshana	RSP	15,455
Prabal Thapa	Nepali Congress	6,364
Rabindra Mishra	RPP	3,972

== Education ==
She was born in Kathmandu, Nepal, and raised by a single mother. She completed her schooling at Bhanubhakta Memorial Higher Secondary School and later pursued higher education at National College, Kathmandu.

== Women Empowerment and Advocacy ==
Ranju Darshana is recognized as an advocate for women's empowerment and gender equality in Nepal. Her political career and public engagements have consistently emphasized increasing women's participation in governance and decision-making processes.

She has promoted policies focused on:

- Expanding economic opportunities and entrepreneurship for women
- Enhancing access to education and skill development
- Strengthening legal and institutional protections against gender-based discrimination
- Increasing female representation in political institutions

Darshana has also addressed societal perceptions surrounding women's roles, particularly in relation to leadership and family responsibilities. Her public stance emphasizes that motherhood and professional leadership are not mutually exclusive, advocating for structural support systems that enable women to balance both.

Her visibility as a young female political leader, combined with her experience of campaigning during pregnancy, has contributed to broader conversations about gender inclusivity in Nepali politics. She is often cited as part of a new generation of leaders challenging traditional norms and encouraging greater participation of women in public life.

== Early activism ==
Darshana began her public engagement as a youth activist at around the age of 17. She participated in campaigns against Nepal Bandha (nationwide strikes) and was actively involved in relief efforts during the 2015 Nepal earthquake. She also engaged in anti-corruption movements and supported medical reform campaigns led by Dr. Govinda K.C., mobilizing youth for peaceful protests.

== Political career ==
=== Bibeksheel Nepali Party (2014–2021) ===
Darshana began her political career with the Bibeksheel Nepali Party. She served as a central committee member and media coordinator and later became a prominent youth face of alternative politics in Nepal.

=== 2017 Kathmandu mayoral election ===
In 2017, at the age of 21, she was nominated as the mayoral candidate of Kathmandu Metropolitan City.

She secured 23,439 votes, finishing third in the election. Her campaign gained widespread attention for its youth-driven and reform-oriented agenda.

=== Bibeksheel Sajha Party (2022–2025) ===
Following party mergers, she became associated with the Bibeksheel Sajha Party and served in leadership roles, including General Secretary.

=== Rastriya Swatantra Party (2025–present) ===
Darshana later joined the Rastriya Swatantra Party (RSP), a rising political force in Nepal's new-generation politics.

== 2026 parliamentary election ==
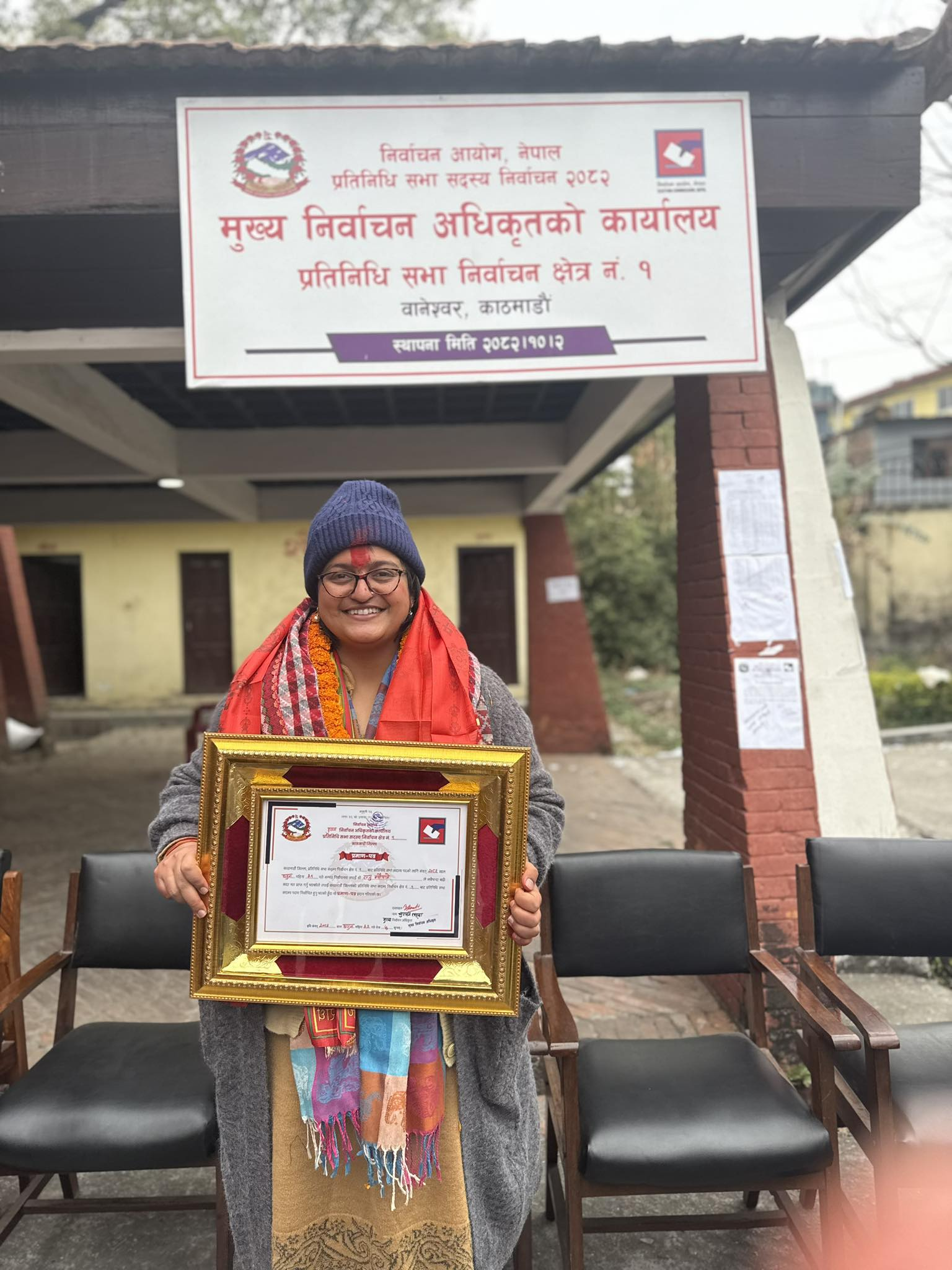
Darshana receiving the certificate after being elected as a member of parliament in the 2026 general elections.

In the 2026 Nepal general election, Ranju Darshana contested from Kathmandu-1 as an RSP candidate and won the seat in the House of Representatives.

- Ranju Darshana (RSP): 15,455 votes
- Prabal Thapa (Nepali Congress): 6,364 votes
- Rabindra Mishra (RPP): 3,972 votes

She became one of the first candidates to secure victory in the election, marking her first parliamentary win.

== Political ideology and public image ==
Ranju Darshana is known for advocating:

- Youth participation in politics
- Transparency and anti-corruption reforms
- Urban governance and civic responsibility

Her 2017 campaign slogan emphasized transforming Kathmandu into “the most beautiful city in the world.”

She is widely regarded as a symbol of Nepal's emerging youth-led political movement.
