= Prakash Chandra Pariyar =

Nepalese politician

The Honourable Prakash Chandra Pariyar
- प्रकाश चन्द्र परियार

Member of Parliament, House of Representatives
- Incumbent
- Assumed office 27 March 2026
- Constituency: PR

Personal details
- Citizenship: Nepalese
- Party: Rastriya Swatantra Party (since 2025)
- Other political affiliations: Bibeksheel Sajha Party (2022–2025)
- Education: Tribhuvan University (BA)
- Profession: Politician

Prakash Chandra Pariyar (Note: Nepali: प्रकाश चन्द्र परियार) is a Nepalese politician serving as a member of parliament and a whip from the Rastriya Swatantra Party. He was elected as a member of the 7th House of Representatives through the Proportional Representation system from the Dalit Male cluster in the 2026 General Election. Pariyar also serves as a party central committee member for the Rastriya Swatantra Party.

He was a former secretary of Bibeksheel Sajha Party till January 2026 which later merged with Rastriya Swatantra party ahead of 2026 election. He holds BA from Mahendra Multiple Campus, Dharan under the Tribhuvan University. On 20 May 2026, Addressing in the parliament meeting of House of representatives, Pariyar welcomed the government's formal apology to the Dalit community as a historic move toward social justice, but stressed that it must be supported by sufficient budget allocation and effective policy action.
