= 2018 Nepalese presidential election =

Presidential election in Nepal

- 13 March 2018
- Registered: 880
- Turnout: 97.95%
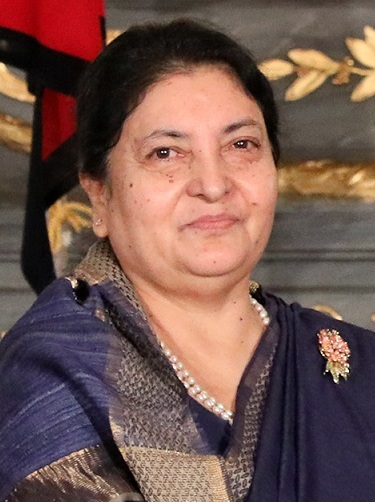

Candidate	Bidya Devi Bhandari	Kumari Laxmi Rai
Party	CPN (UML)	Congress
Electoral vote	39,275	11,730
Percentage	77.00%	23.00%
President before election
Bidya Devi Bhandari
CPN (UML)
Elected President
Bidya Devi Bhandari
CPN (UML)

The third presidential election of Nepal was held on 13 March 2018. As a new election law was developed (which is foreseen by the Constitution of Nepal) and as, due to the Nepalese election in 2017, an electoral college could be established, the election took place three years after the previous presidential elections despite the presidential term of office actually being set at 5 years. The President was elected by an electoral college composed of the members of federal parliament and provincial assemblies. The total number of voters was thus 880, (Note: 3 members of National Assembly and 1 member of Province Assembly were not included in the voter list) however the 331 members of Federal Parliament have a vote weight of 79, while the 549 members of Provincial Assemblies have a vote weight of 48. In total 862 lawmakers participated in the election leading to a turnout of 97.95%.

== Electoral college ==
Party	Pratinidhi Sabha votes	Rastriya Sabha votes	Pradesh Sabha votes	Total votes	Percentage
CPN (Unified Marxist-Leninist)	9,559	2,133	11,664	23,356	44.43%
Nepali Congress	4,997	1,027	5,424	11,448	21.78%
CPN (Maoist Centre)	4,187	948	5,184	10,319	19.63%
Federal Socialist Forum, Nepal	1,264	158	1,776	3,198	6.08%
Rastriya Janata Party Nepal	1,343	158	1,344	2,845	5.41%
Rastriya Janamorcha	79	0	192	271	0.52%
Rastriya Prajatantra Party	79	0	144	223	0.42%
Naya Shakti Party, Nepal	79	0	144	223	0.42%
Nepal Mazdoor Kisan Party	79	0	96	175	0.33%
Bibeksheel Sajha Party	0	0	144	144	0.27%
Sanghiya Loktantrik Rastriya Manch	0	0	48	48	0.09%
Rastriya Prajatantra Party (Democratic)	0	0	48	48	0.09%
Nepal Federal Socialist Party	0	0	48	48	0.09%
Independents	79	0	144	223	0.42%
Total	21,745	4,424	26,400	52,569	100%

== Candidates ==
=== Communist Party of Nepal (Unified Marxist–Leninist) ===
Name	Born	Current or previous positions	Province	Announced	Ref
Bidya Devi Bhandari	19 June 1961 (aged 56); Bhojpur, Province No. 1	Member of the Legislature Parliament of Nepal (2013–2015) Minister of Defence (2009–2011) Minister of Population and Environment (1997) Member of the House of Representatives from Kathmandu 2 (1994–2002) Member of the House of Representatives from Kathmandu 1 (1993–1994)	Province No. 1	7 March 2018	

=== Nepali Congress ===
Name	Born	Current or previous positions	Province	Announced	Ref
Kumari Laxmi Rai	1 July 1949 (aged 68); Bhojpur, Province No. 1	Member of the Legislature Parliament of Nepal (2013–2018)	Province No. 1	7 March 2018	

== Results ==
Bhandari's election was supported by her own party, the Communist Party of Nepal (Unified Marxist–Leninist) and coalition partner Communist Party of Nepal (Maoist Centre) as well as Federal Socialist Forum, Nepal, Rastriya Janata Party Nepal, Rastriya Janamorcha and Rastriya Prajatantra Party.

Bidhya Devi Bhandari received 245 votes of federal members, and 415 from provincial ones, resulting in 39,275 weighted votes. Kumari Laxmi Rai received 78 votes of federal members, and 116 from provincial ones, resulting in 11,730 weighted votes. Out of the 331 federal members, 323 cast valid votes, 3 voted blank and 5 abstained, while out of the 549 provincial members, 531 cast valid votes, 5 voted blank and 13 abstained.

Results
Candidate	Political Party	Votes			Total votes	%
Candidate	Political Party	Federal	Provincial	Total	Total votes	%
Bidhya Devi Bhandari	CPN (UML)	245	415	660	39,275	77.00
Kumari Laxmi Rai	NC	78	116	194	11,730	23.00
Valid votes		323	531	854	51,005	99.07
Blank votes		3	5	8	477	0.93
Total		326	536	862	51,482	100
Registered voters / turnout		331	549	880	52,501	97.95

== Vice-presidential election ==
The election for the Vice President of Nepal was scheduled to take place on 23 March 2018. However, as incumbent Nanda Kishor Pun, was the only candidate for the office and no complaints were filed against him, he was declared Vice President of Nepal by the Election Commission on 18 March 2018.
