= Samikchya Baskota =

Nepalese politician

Honourable Samikchya Baskota
- समीक्षा बास्कोटा

Member of Parliament, Pratinidhi Sabha
- Incumbent
- Assumed office 27 March 2026
- President: Ram Chandra Poudel
- Prime Minister: Balendra Shah
- PR group: Khas Arya (Women)
- Constituency: Rastriya Swatantra Party PR list

Chairman of Bibeksheel Sajha Party
- In office 11 February 2023 – 30 November 2025
- Preceded by: Rabindra Mishra
- Succeeded by: Merged into Rastriya Swatantra Party

Personal details
- Born: 24 February 1984 (age 42) Phidim, Panchthar District, Nepal
- Citizenship: Nepalese
- Party: Rastriya Swatantra Party (since 2025)
- Other political affiliations: Bibeksheel Sajha Party (2017–2025)
- Parent: Dipak Prakash Baskota (father)
- Education: Kathmandu School of Law (LLB); St. John's University (LL.M.)
- Profession: Politician, Lawyer, Businessperson, Tea entrepreneur

Samikchya Baskota (Note: Nepali: समीक्षा बास्कोटा) (born 24 February 1984) is a Nepalese politician serving as a member of parliament from the Rastriya Swatantra Party (RSP). She was elected to the 7th Pratinidhi Sabha through the proportional representation system from the Khas Arya women cluster in the 2026 general election.

== Early life and education ==
Baskota holds a LL.B. degree from Kathmandu School of Law under Kathmandu University.

== Political career ==
Baskota became involved in politics through the Bibeksheel movement and later served as chairperson of the Bibeksheel Sajha Party.

In 2022, she contested the 2022 Kathmandu municipal election as a candidate for mayor of Kathmandu Metropolitan City but was unsuccessful.

Following the merger of the Bibeksheel Sajha Party with the Rastriya Swatantra Party ahead of the 2026 general election, Baskota joined RSP and was appointed to its Central Committee.

Since April 2026, she has served on the Law, Justice and Human Rights Committee of the House of Representatives as the RSP's representative.

== Public statements ==
In June 2026, Baskota attracted media attention after stating in Parliament that Nepal had experienced "35 years of disorder" and that the Rastriya Swatantra Party had entered politics to address governance failures and institutional weaknesses accumulated during that period.

== Electoral performance ==
Election	Year	Constituency	Contested for	Political party	Result	Votes	% of votes	Ref.
2022 Kathmandu local election	2022	Kathmandu	Mayor of Kathmandu	Bibeksheel Sajha Party	Lost	647	0.40%	
2017 provincial election	2017	Kathmandu 1(A)	Provincial assembly member	Bibeksheel Sajha Party	Lost	4343	27.04%	
