= Bhanubhakta Memorial Higher Secondary School =

- (Nepal) Kathmandu, Bagmati; Nepal

Information
- Type: Non-government
- Motto: Character, Knowledge, Service
- Established: 1967
- Affiliation: School Leaving Certificate (SLC) Higher Secondary Education Board Tribhuwan University
- Website: www.bbms.edu.np

Bhanu Bhakta Memorial Higher Secondary School is a pioneer school in the Kathmandu Valley, located at Panipokhari, Kathmandu, opposite to the Japanese Embassy, Nepal. It was established in 1967 to the memory of the pioneer poet late Bhanubhakta Acharya – a figure of Nepali literature. In 2016, the school completed 50 years of its establishment, and has celebrated its golden anniversary. It is a co-educational and English medium school, catering for children with the age group of 3 (Nursery) to 18 (XII class), as well as college level students. The school follows modern methods of teaching having recently installed smart classes and closed circuit television cameras.

== Background ==
In 1995, the school opened a higher secondary level. In 2009, it began a higher-education program leading to a Bachelor's degree. In 2013, a Masters level program was introduced in business studies and administration. The institution offers education from the primary level to the degree level. There are more than 2200 students enrolled, from all parts of the country, taught by almost 150 teachers. There is a hostel facility, separate for boys and girls.

Bhanubhakta Memorial Higher Secondary School began in a rented building 39 years back and imparts education its students in the capital city of Nepal.

== Present day ==
It has four modern buildings, and a building used as teacher's quarter cum hostel. The main building houses Secondary and Primary wings. The Gajurel Bhavan is used for pre-primary, the Lower Secondary for primary, and a building for college wings. The school has a boys’ hostel and a science laboratory for practical classes, and overall three computer labs. Judo Hall, multipurpose Astrid Hall, Music Hall, and Smart Class hall are other facilities in the school. The higher secondary wing is a five-storied building.

With about 2200 students and nearly 150 teachers, Bhanubhakta Memorial Higher Secondary school is one of the biggest private schools of Nepal, providing both educational as well as physical facilities to day scholars, day boarders and boarders who come from every corner of the country. The school has two separate playgrounds with basketball, badminton and volleyball courts as well as five table tennis boards. There are separate cricket nets as well.

The school is divided into Primary Wing (classes Nursery-IV), Middle Wing (class- V-VIII), Secondary Wing (classes IX & X) Higher Secondary Wing (classes XI&XII), and college. The instructional staff in the middle and secondary wings comprises five faculties, each under a Faculty Head. All these wings are supervised by their respective in-charges. The Higher secondary wing is looked after by a separate management under Nepal Education Foundation (NEF), whereas MBA and MBS is affiliated with Tribhuwan University.

== Trust ==
The school is run by Bhanu Bhakta School Trust. The trust has a chairman and board members responsible for running the school.

== Donation ==
It was once donated by French and German Organization. It was donated by CCTV cameras. And every class has CCTV camera.

== Notable alumni ==
- Rajesh Hamal
- Narayan Kaji Shrestha
- Nisha Adhikari
- Ranju Darshana
