= Aananda Pokharel =

Nepalese politician

Ananda Prasad Pokharel
- आनन्द प्रसाद पोखरेल

Minister of Culture, Tourism and Civil Aviation
- In office 5 Nov 2015 – 4 Aug 2016
- President: Ram Baran Yadav
- Prime Minister: KP Sharma Oli
- President: Bidhya Devi Bhandari

Personal details
- Party: Nepal Communist Party (NCP)

Ananda Prasad Pokharel (Nepali: आनन्द प्रसाद पोखरेल; born on 12 March 1960) is a Nepali politician and former Minister for Culture, Tourism and Civil Aviation of Nepal. He is currently holding position of Central Committee Member and also Bagmati Province Committee Secretary of Nepal Communist Party (NCP). He was elected Member of Parliament from 2056 to 2063 BS as Dolakha Constituent. He again got elected in 2070 BS as a Member of the Second Constitutional Assembly, after the failure of the first assembly to promulgate a constitution. Also, he is chairman of Nepal China Himalayan Friendship Society (NeCHiFS) Nepal, which has been major contributor in construction of School and Community building in Nepal-China border districts since decade.

Pokharel was born in 1960 AD to an agricultural family in Dolakha District. After completion of SLC level of studies from local school Baiteshwor Ma.Vi., he then joined Institute of Agriculture and Animal Science (IAAS) in Chitwan district where he also started his political career as member of All Nepal Free Student Union (ANSFU) and later he chaired the committee in 2037 BS for 5 years. In the meantime, he also engaged in mainstream politics through the then CPN (ML) - Alliance of Nepal Revolutionary coordination Committee.

Pokharel completed Masters of Arts (Agricultural development) from Tribhuvan University in 1983 AD, and Bachelor in Law from Nepal Law Campus in 1979 AD, yet he is non-practicing lawyer.
