= BBC Nepali =

Nepali language service of the BBC World Service

BBC Nepali बीबीसी नेपाली
- BBC Nepali loads news
- Type: Radio network and website
- Country: United Kingdom and Nepal
- First air date: 2025
- Availability: International
- Radio transmitters: Kathmandu Valley (103.0 FM)
- Endowment: Foreign and Commonwealth Office, UK
- Owner: BBC
- Launch date: 7 June 1969; 57 years ago
- Webcast: www.bbc.com/nepali/bbc_nepali_radio/liveradio
- Official website: www.bbc.co.uk/nepali/
- Language: Nepali

BBC Nepali (Nepali: बीबीसी नेपाली, romanized: Bībīsī Nepālī) is one of the 27 language services provided under the BBC World Service's foreign language output. It broadcasts in the Nepali language on FM and over the internet.

== History ==
BBC Nepali was launched on 7 June 1969 as a weekly program on the BBC World Service. In the early years the programs were hosted by Nepali students studying in the United Kingdom. In 1970 BBC's Nepali output became available five days a week, and later was made available on every day of the week. Initially, the programs were directed at British Gorkha soldiers working in Hong Kong. Later it became widely popular in the Nepali community as impartial and trustworthy news broadcasting. Today the broadcasts are received by Nepali speakers worldwide.

Its shortwave radio broadcasts stopped in March 2011, but was brought back for a while following the April 2015 Nepal earthquake.

== Programming ==
BBC Nepali concentrates on news, analysis, and discussion. It carries 15 minutes of radio time. As of 2 August 2024, a daily fifteen-minute program called सांझपख (Saanjhapakh) is transmitted at 21:44 Nepal Standard Time (UTC+05:45)., which is concentrated on news, but also includes certain other programmes.

== See also ==
- BBC
- BBC World Service
- BBC News
- Category:BBC newsreaders and journalists
- Category:BBC television news shows
- List of current BBC newsreaders and reporters
- List of former BBC newsreaders and journalists
- List of companies based in London
- List of television programmes broadcast by the BBC
- Stations of the BBC
- The Green Book
- British television
- Early television stations
- Gaelic broadcasting in Scotland
- Public service broadcasting in the United Kingdom
- Quango, an abbreviation for quasi-autonomous non-governmental organisation
