= Naya Shakti Party, Nepal =

Naya Shakti Party, Nepal नयाँ शक्ति पार्टी, नेपाल
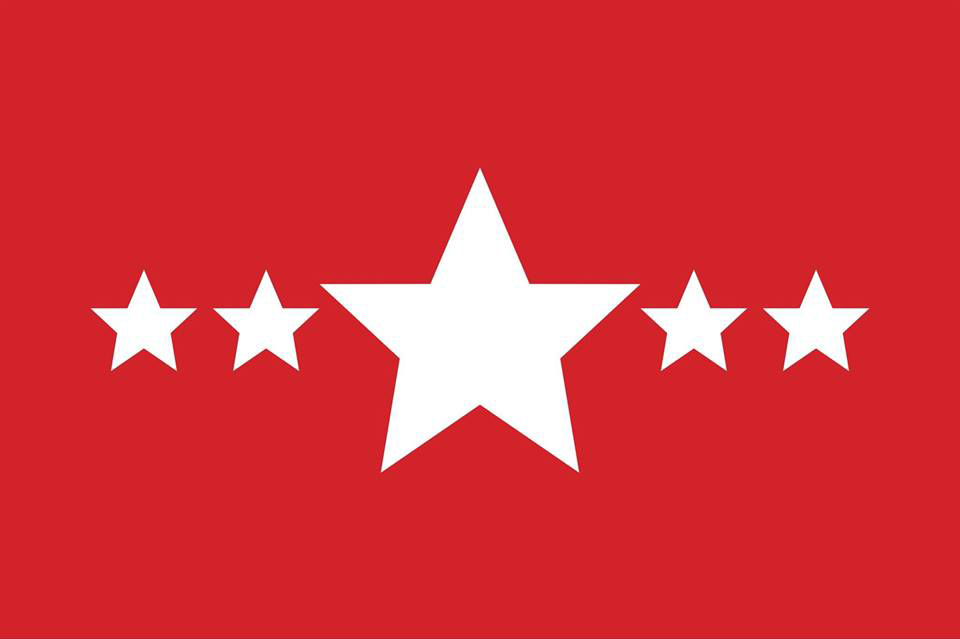
- Leader: Baburam Bhattarai
- Founded: 12 June 2016 (9 years ago)
- Dissolved: 6 May 2019
- Split from: Unified Communist Party of Nepal (Maoist)
- Succeeded by: Samajbadi Party, Nepal
- Headquarters: Babarmahal, Kathmandu
- Student wing: Naya Shakti Student Union
- Youth wing: National Youth Campaign
- Women's wing: Female Shakti Federation
- Trade wing: Nepal Socialist Industrial Workers Union
- Ideology: Democratic socialism Marxism
- Political position: Center-left to left-wing
- Seats in Pratinidhi Sabha: 1 / 275

Election symbol

Website
- nayashaktinepal.org

Naya Shakti Party, Nepal (Nepali: नयाँ शक्ति पार्टी, नेपाल, translation: New Force Party, Nepal) was a democratic socialist political party in Nepal formed by former Prime Minister Baburam Bhattarai on 12 June 2016. On 6 May 2019, the party merged with Federal Socialist Forum, Nepal to form Samajbadi Party, Nepal.

== History ==
=== Background ===
Baburam Bhattarai was a senior vice-chairman of the Unified Communist Party of Nepal (Maoist) and was involved in the party for over two decades, including during the Nepalese Civil War. He became the Prime Minister of Nepal while a member of the UCPN (Maoist). As Prime Minister he dissolved the 1st Nepalese Constituent Assembly to pave the way for new elections. After the constitution of Nepal was promulgated on 25 September 2015 by the 2nd Nepalese Constituent Assembly he resigned from the newly formed Parliament of Nepal and quit his party to form his own political "force". On January 21, 2016, he announced the formation of the Naya Shakti Nepal Interim Central Council, which he said would develop into a political party. Finally on June 12, 2016, he announced the establishment of Naya Shakti Party, Nepal under his leadership. The party gained its first parliamentarian after the Tharuhat Tarai Party (Democratic) merged into the party on February 14. Following this Ganga Satuwa Chaudhary was announced as the parliamentary party leader of Naya Shakti.

=== Elections ===
The 2017 Nepalese local elections were the first major elections contested by the party. The party decided to run a joint campaign with Federal Socialist Forum, Nepal including the use of their election symbol. In the third phase the election however the two parties broke their alliance and Naya Shakti used their own election symbol. The party won 110 seats in the local government including two mayor or chairman posts. On 13 October 2017, Naya Shakti Party along with the Communist Party of Nepal (Maoist Centre) and the Communist Party of Nepal (Unified Marxist–Leninist) announced the formation of an electoral alliance. The party however quit the alliance on 14 October 2017 citing differences with the two parties. The party then joined an alliance with Nepali Congress to contest the elections. In the legislative and provincial elections, the party won a single seat to the House of Representatives. The party also won three seats in provincial assemblies including one in Province No. 3 and two in Province No. 4. The party supported Nepali Congress candidate, Radhe Shyam Adhikari in the National Assembly elections on 6 February 2018. Naya Shakti Party along with Bibeksheel Sajha Party abstained from voting in the 2018 presidential and vice-presidential elections.

== Ideology ==
Founder Baburam Bhattarai stated the main ideology of the party was Marxism. The party supported a presidential system of government with a proportionally elected parliament. They believed in strengthening the industrial capitalism and eventually developing it into socialism. The party also believed in taking "the workers", "the middle class" and "the national bourgeois class" together to ensure wholesome development. The party had stated support for gender rights, dalit rights and minority rights. It opposed careerism, which it sees as pervasive in modern Nepali politics, and had stated "good governance" as one of its platform goals.

== Sister organizations ==
- Yuwa Shakti Nepal
- Female Shakti Federation
- Naya Shakti Student Union
- Nepal Socialist Industrial Workers Union
- Nepal Socialist Hotel and Casino Workers Union
- International Nepalese Society (INS)

== Electoral performance ==
Election	Leader	Votes		Seats	Position	Resulting government
Election	Leader	#	%	Seats	Position	Resulting government
2017	Baburam Bhattarai	81,837	0.86 (Note: Represented as Independent for not reaching the 3% threshold)	1 / 275	9th	CPN (UML)-CPN (Maoist Centre)

== Presence in various provinces ==
Year	Province No. 3	Province No. 4
2017	1 / 110	2 / 60

== See also ==
- Nepal Socialist Party (Naya Shakti)
- List of political parties in Nepal
- Samajbadi Party, Nepal
