= Bibeksheel Nepali =

Bibeksheel Nepali Dal विवेकशील नेपाली दल
- Chairperson: Milan Pandey
- General Secretary: Nirdesh Silwal
- Founded: 2012; 2019 (refounded)
- Legalised: 2014
- Dissolved: 2021
- Succeeded by: Bibeksheel Sajha Party
- Headquarters: Maharajgunj, Kathmandu
- Ideology: Pragmatism; Reformism; Progressivism
- Colors: Red and Black
- Seats in Provincial Assemblies: 2 / 110 (Bagmati Province)

Election symbol
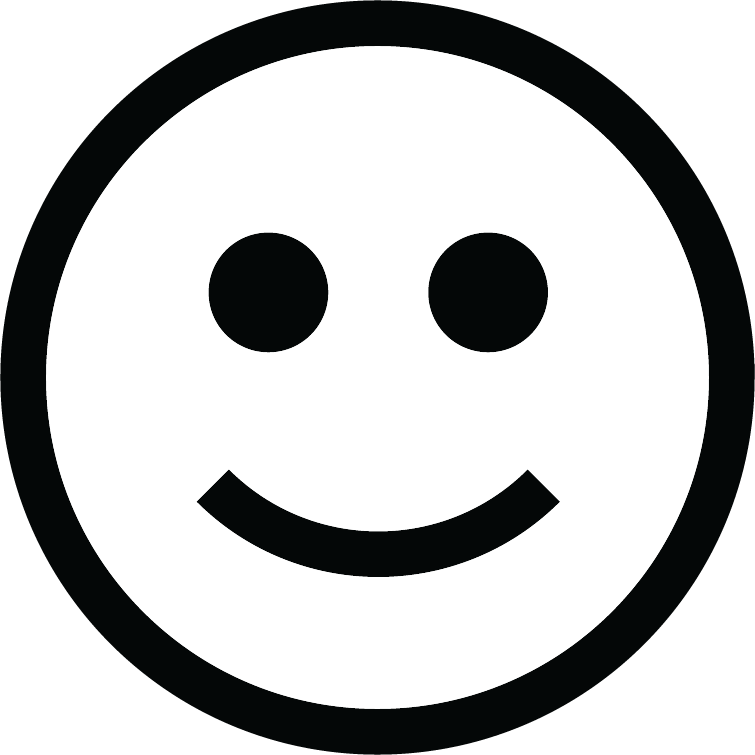

Website
- bibeksheelnepali.com

Bibeksheel Nepali Dal (विवेकशील नेपाली दल) is a political party in Nepal. The name "Bibeksheel" translates to "common sense wisdom".

When the first Constitutional Assembly was dissolved, it organized a recurring session called "What Next?" (अब के गर्ने?).

== History ==
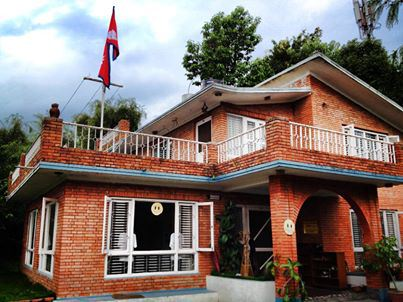
right।Bibeksheel Nepali Party Head Office

In 2013 Ujwal Thapa, the ex-chairperson of Bibeksheel Nepali ran as an independent candidate in the second Constitutional Assembly election, which was held on November 19, 2013. At the time of the election, the symbol of the party was a dog (कुकुर). With four independent candidates in the Kathmandu Valley, the party received about 3,000 votes, mostly from young voters. After the second Constitutional Assembly election, it was registered as "Bibeksheel Nepali", a political party with a smiling face as an election symbol.

On April 18, 2017, Bibeksheel Nepali Party nominated 21-year-old Ranju Darshana to run for mayor of Kathmandu in the May 14 elections.

Ahead of the third phase of local elections, Bibeksheel Nepali Dal merged with Sajha Party to form Bibeksheel Sajha Party.

=== Reformation ===
Bibeksheel Sajha Party suffered a split on 11 January 2019 and Bibeksheel Nepali Dal was reformed. Co-coordinator of Bibeksheel Sajha Party and founder of the original Bibeksheel Nepali Dal, Ujwal Bahadur Thapa along with 16 central committee members and two members of provincial assembly split from the party and registered with the Election Commission. The party held its general convention in Janakpur on 17 October 2019 and elected Milan Pandey as its chairman.

The party announced on 20 October 2020 that it was in talks with Sajha Party for reunification.

However, 13 central committee members including vice-chair Ajeeta Rai and office management secretary Sangita Bataju who had opposed the second unification decided not to go with the merge. The group later formed Nepal Bibeksheel Party under the leadership of Karma Tamang. Bibeksheel nepali was later merged with Sajha party forming Bibeksheel Sajha party. The new party would be led under the joint leadership of Rabindra Mishra and Ujwal Bahadur Thapa. Bibeksheel Nepali and Sajha Party merged twice: first on July 26, 2017 and then re-merged on December 9, 2020 after an initial split. The unified entity was known as the Bibeksheel Sajha Party. The Bibeksheel Sajha Party again announced merger with Rastriya Swatantra Party in November 30, 2025 targeting election in March 2026.

== Ideology ==
The party was established and led by the country's youth and managed from around the world. The underlying belief is that both the present and future belong to a corruption-free youth. Bibeksheel Nepali made freedom and economic prosperity its main goals. The party believed in eight pillars leading to a prosperous Nepal: responsible citizens, accountable leadership, servant government, empowered Nepal, united Nepali, free Nepali, open and evolving Nepali, and prosperous Nepal. The party is based upon a pledge of honour. All signatories of the Bikeksheel Nepali made a pledge with their lives to support independence. A vast majority, sixty per cent of Nepalese, are under the age of 40 as of December 2014. Bibeksheel Nepali Dal vowed to fight specifically for this group, which was said to be particularly disadvantaged.

== Leadership ==
=== Chairmen of Bibeksheel Nepali Dal ===
- Milan Pandey (2019–present)

=== General Secretaries of Bibeksheel Nepali Dal ===
- Nirdesh Silwal (2019–Nov 2020)

== Activities ==
=== Anti-bandhs demonstration ===
On January 13, 2015, the party organized a rally in the Kathmandu Valley protesting against the regular bandhs (strikes) in Nepal. The demonstrators protested on the grounds that bandhs disrupted the normal life of citizens and had a negative impact on the Nepali economy. Many young people participated in the rally, carrying national flags and placards reading "Nepal is open" (नेपाल खुल्ला छ). Bandh enforcers attempted to confront the demonstrators but were blocked from doing so by the police.

=== Relief distribution to quake-affected areas ===
Bibeksheel Nepali Dal created a separate unit, Bibeksheel Nepali Earthquake Response Task Force (BNERTF), to gather information, collect funds, coordinate relief, take care of rehabilitation, and set out on reconstruction works. BNERTF started its relief program from Gorkha on April 27, 2015, and covered more than 500 affected areas. They provided relief materials to 6,000 households in 17 quake-affected districts. The party's volunteers were with a team of medical volunteers including 50 doctors. The party distributed at least 80 tonnes of rice, 60,000 packets of instant noodles, 40,000 packets of biscuits, 18,000 liters of water and 10,000 tents. Additionally, there were more than 5,000 shelters for quake victims built.

=== Relief delay protest ===
On April 24, 2016, the anniversary of the devastating earthquake of 2015, Bibeksheel Nepali Dal staged a protest against the delay in providing relief to the quake victims and called for the reconstruction of damaged properties and structures. Dressed in black, a group of nearly two dozen people staged a protest when PM K.P.Sharma Oli was en route to attend a commemoration for the people killed when Dharahara collapsed during the quake. The demonstration was an effort to raise the issue of delayed reconstruction efforts.

=== Lokman controversy ===
On July 27, 2016, the party protested against the chief of CIAA who did not appear at the meeting of the Good Governance and Monitoring Committee (GGMC) of the Parliament held at Singha Durbar, citing health problems. The GMCC had invited Lokman Karki and the other commissioners to discuss the accusations that the CIAA had interfered in MD & MS entrance examination at Kathmandu University against the principal of academic jurisdiction by holding the examinations on their own. In the letter to the committee, he stated that he had a throat infection and doctors had advised him not to speak for a week.

=== Solidarity rally in support of Dr Govinda KC ===
On October 1, 2016, Bibeksheel Nepali Dal members in solidarity with Dr. Govinda KC, organized a peace march with the slogan "End Corruption: Support Democracy". The march started from Maitighar and ended at New Baneshwor. The government failure to address its four-point agreement with Dr. Govinda led him to conduct a hunger strike. The four-point agreement included addressing previous agreements, the passage of a new medical education bill, impeachment of Lokman Karki, chief of CIAA, and implementation of medical fees proposed by the Mathema Commission.

== Presence in various provinces ==
Province	Seats	Year of election
Bagmati	2 / 110	2017

== See also ==
- Sajha Bibeksheel Party
- Sajha Party
