= Bibeksheel Sajha Party =

Political party in Nepal

Bibeksheel Sajha Party विवेकशील साझा पार्टी
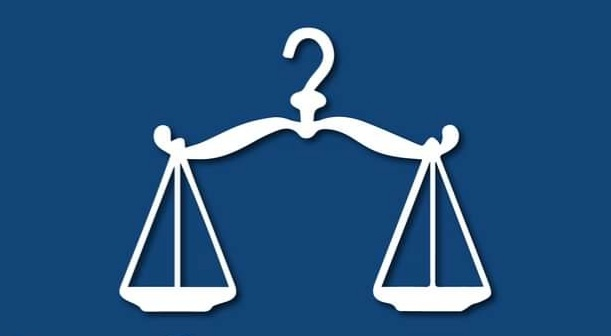
- Abbreviation: BSP
- Chairman: Samikchya Baskota
- General Secretary: Ranju Darshana; Prakash Chandra Pariyar
- Spokesperson: Aashutosh Pradhan
- Founded: 26 July 2017; 9 December 2020 (Refounded)
- Dissolved: 26 November 2025 (Second iternation)
- Merger of: Sajha Party; Bibeksheel Nepali; Citizen Discussion Forum
- Merged into: RSP
- Headquarters: Bakhundol, Lalitpur, Nepal
- Youth wing: Bibeksheel Sajha Yuva Sangathan
- Ideology: Welfarism; Socialism; Federalism; Secularism
- Seats in Provincial Assemblies: 0 / 110 Bagmati Province
- Local governments: 1 / 753 Mayor/Chairperson

Election symbol

Website
- bsp.org.np

The Bibeksheel Sajha Party (Nepali: विवेकशील साझा पार्टी) was a political party in Nepal. It was the sixth largest party of Nepal by popular vote after 2017 Nepalese general election and the fifth largest party in Bagmati provincial assembly. The party later faced existential crisis after Rabindra Mishra merged party with Rastriya Prajatantra Party and leftover could manage only 4,049 votes nationwide. The party's faction led by Samikchya Baskota and Ranju Darsana later merged into Rastriya Swatantra Party. In an after math, former chairman Milan Pandey led group abstained from merger process with Rastriya Swatantra Party and said this was not the end of alternative politics.

== Background ==
It was originally founded on 26 July 2017 from the merger of Sajha Party and Bibeksheel Nepal Dal, but the party split on 11 January 2019. The two parties merged for a second time on 9 December 2020.

Rabindra Mishra, coordinator of Party merged the Bibeksheel Sajha Party with an ideologically far-right Rastriya Prajratantra Party. Youth leaders of party opposed merger and retained party's original principles rejecting Rabindra Mishra's document 'Changing Course: Nation Above Notion' that proposes abolition of federalism and a plebiscite on secularism but failed to save their deposits in election when formerly mayor candidate Ranju Darsana could garner just 600 votes.

== History ==
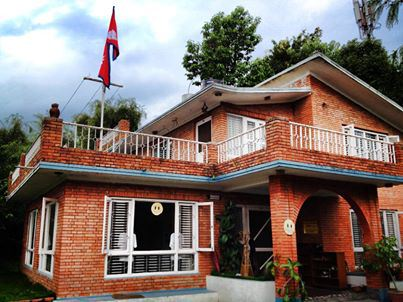
Party Headquarter

On 26 July 2017 it was announced that Sajha Party would merge with Bibeksheel Nepali Dal to form Bibeksheel Sajha Party. The new party would be led under the joint leadership of Rabindra Mishra and Ujwal Bahadur Thapa. The party adopted scales as their electoral symbol.

In the 2017 legislative elections, the party contested 60 seats but won none. Party. The party won 212,336 votes under proportional representation and finished with the sixth highest number of votes in the country. They were unable to cross the three percent threshold to gain seats in the House of Representatives. The party also did not win any seats in the 2017 provincial election under first past the post but won three seats to the Provincial Assembly of Province No. 3 under proportional representation after finishing with the fourth highest number of votes with 124,442 votes. The party decided to support Nepali Congress candidate Radhe Shyam Adhikari in the National Assembly elections on 6 February 2018. Bibeksheel Sajha Party, along with Naya Shakti Party, abstained from voting in the 2018 presidential and vice-presidential elections.

=== 2022 General Election and First Convention ===
Following Mishra's departure, Bibeksheel Sajha Party participated 2022 Federal and Provincial election. Bibeksheel Sajha Party did its first general convention on February 11, 2023 electing Chair Samkichya Baskota, Vice-Chairs Milan Pandey and Prakash Chandra Pariyar, and General Secretary Rajnu Darshana.

== Electoral performance ==
Election	Leader(s)	Votes		Seats		Position	Resulting government
Election	Leader(s)	#	%	#	+/-	Position	Resulting government
2017	Rabindra Mishra; Ujwal Bahadur Thapa	212,366	2.22	0 / 275		6th	CPN (UML) – CPN (Maoist Centre)
2022	Milan Pandey	4,049	0.04	0 / 275			CPN (UML) – CPN (Maoist Centre)

=== Local election ===
Election	Leader(s)	Seats		Local level
Election	Leader(s)	#	+/-	Local level
2022	Rabindra Mishra	1 / 753	+1	Pheta Rural Municipality

== Leadership ==
=== Party presidents ===
- Rabindra Mishra, 26 July 2017 - 25 May 2022
- Samikchya Baskota, 11 February 2023 - 26 November 2025

=== General Secretary ===
- Ranju Darshana, 11 February 2023 - 26 November 2025
- Prakash Chandra Pariyar, 11 February 2023 - 26 November 2025

=== Spokesperson ===
- Ashutosh Pradhan, 2 June 2023 - 26 November 2025

=== Head Office Management ===
- Nabaraj Thapa, 2 June 2023 - 26 November 2025

== Presence in provincial assemblies ==
Province	Election year	Seats		Resulting Government
Province	Election year	No.	Position	Resulting Government
Bagmati	2017	3 / 110	5th	Opposition

== See also ==
- Sajha Party
- Bibeksheel Nepali Dal
