= 2017 Nepalese local elections =

- 14 May 2017; 28 June 2017; 18 September 2017

6 Metropolitan Cities 11 Sub-Metropolitan Cities 276 Municipalities 460 Rural Municipalities
- Turnout: 73.81% (first round); 73.38% (second round); 77% (third round)
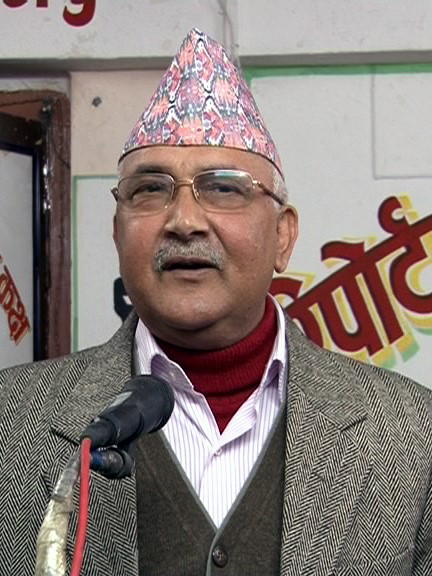

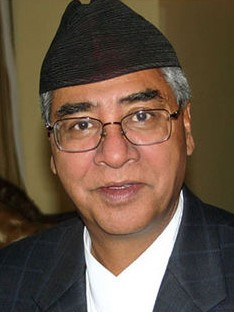

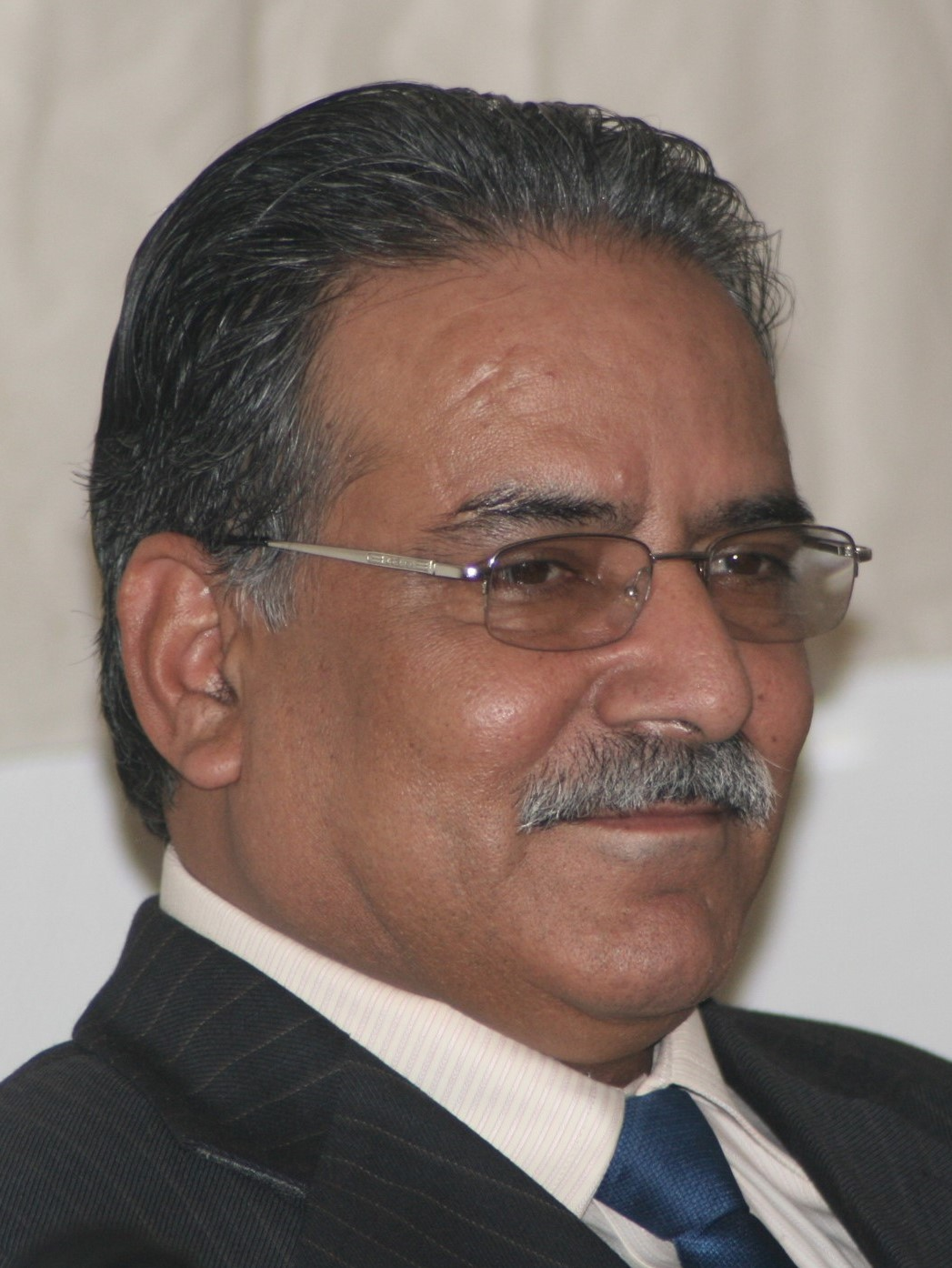

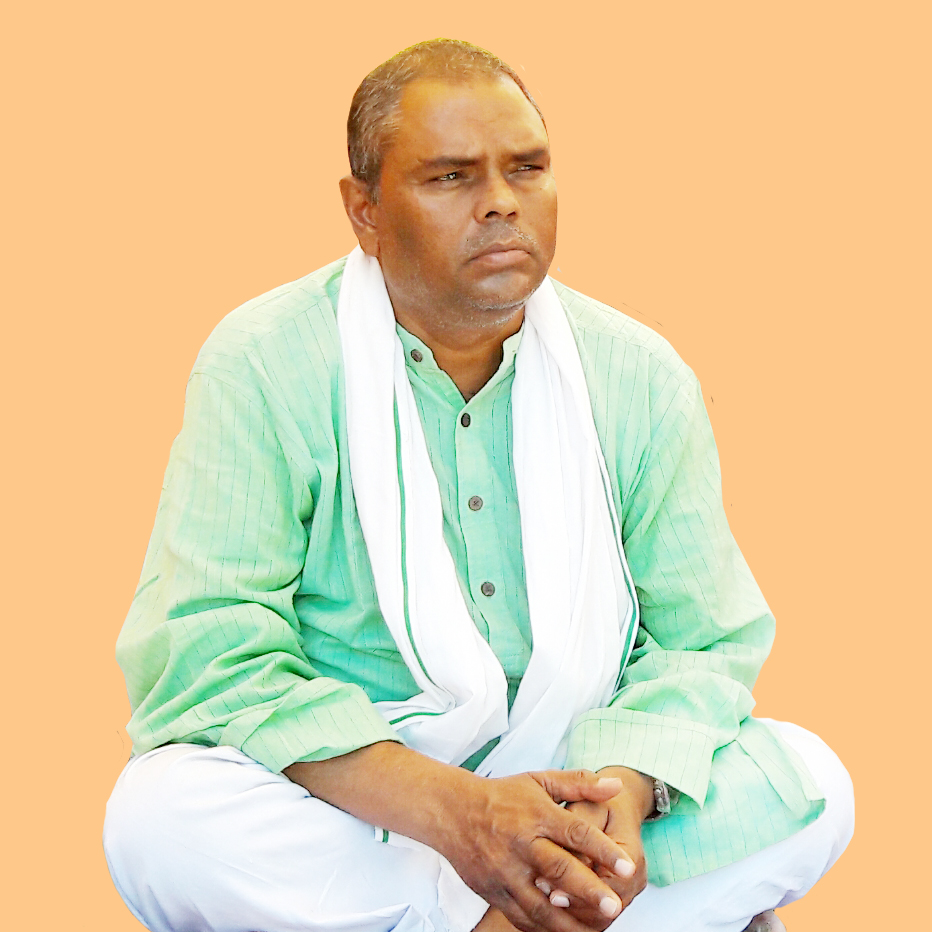

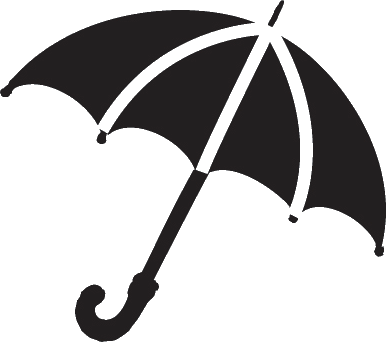

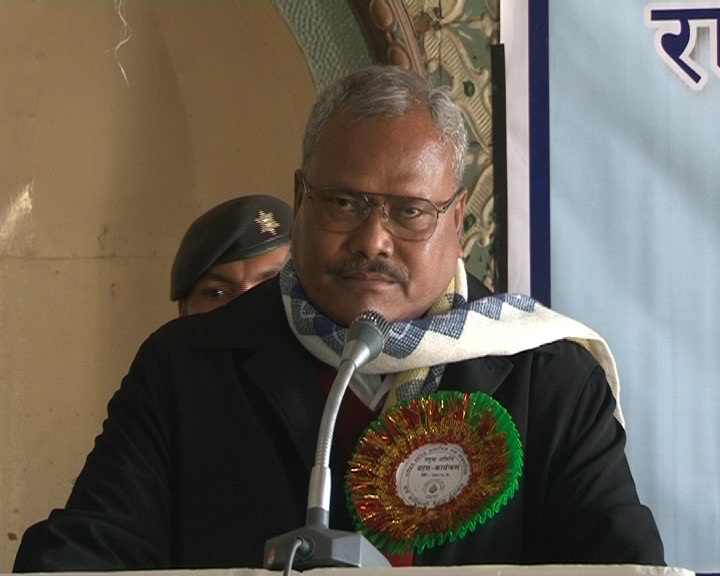

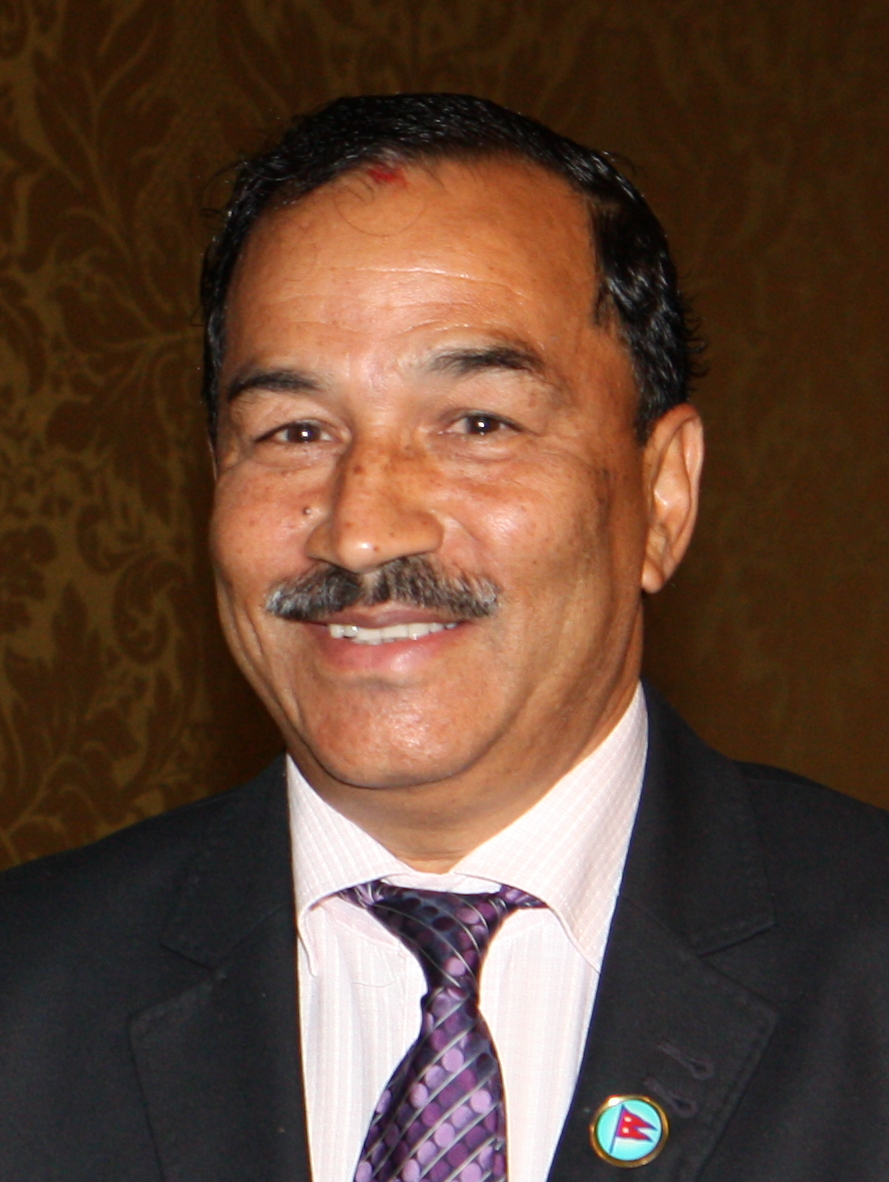

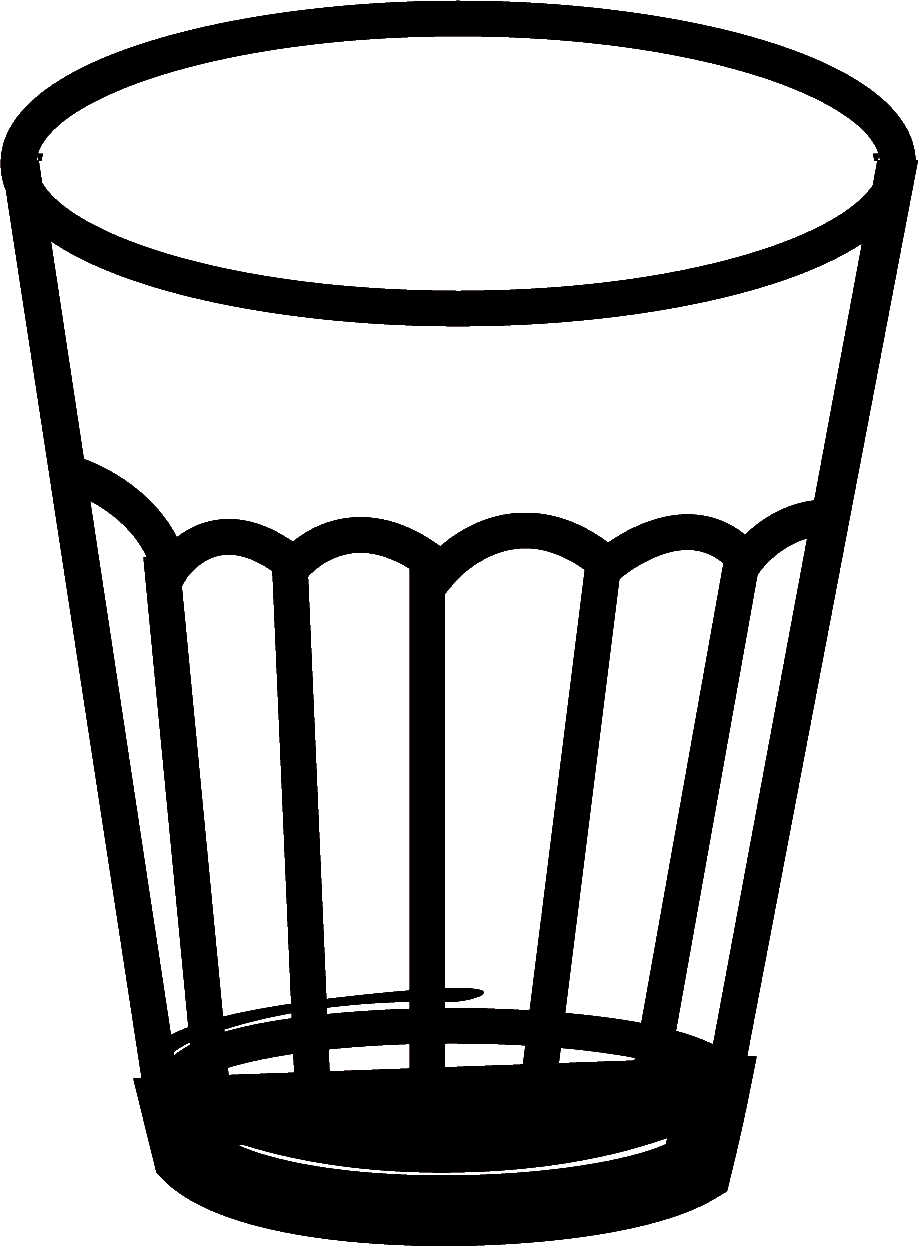

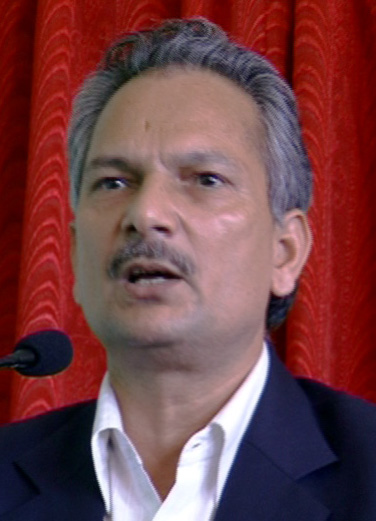
	First party	Second party	Third party
Leader	Khadga Prasad Oli	Sher Bahadur Deuba	Pushpa Kamal Dahal
Party	UML	Congress	Maoist Centre
Leader since	July 2014	7 March 2016	May 1999
Mayors/Chair persons	294	266	106
	Fourth party	Fifth party	Sixth party
Leader	Upendra Yadav	Mahantha Thakur	Bijay Kumar Gachhadar
Party	FSFN	RJPN	NLF
Leader since	15 June 2015	21 April 2017	5 April 2017
Mayors/Chair persons	34	25	9
	Seventh party	Eighth party	Ninth party
Leader	Kamal Thapa	Chitra Bahadur KC	Baburam Bhattarai
Party	RPP	Janamorcha	Naya Shakti
Leader since	20 February 2017	26 May 2006	June 2016
Mayors/Chair persons	5	3	2

The 2017 Nepalese local elections were held in Nepal in three phases on 14 May, 28 June and 18 September in 6 metropolitan cities, 11 sub-metropolitan cities, 276 municipalities and 460 rural municipalities. It was the first local level election to be held since the promulgation of the 2015 constitution.

== Background ==
Local elections were held in 53 municipalities in February 2006 under regime of King Gyanendra but were boycotted by the major political parties and saw low voter turnout. Prior to 2006, the previous elections was held in 1997 with a mandate of five years. Elections were supposed to be held on 2002 but were delayed due to the then ongoing Nepal Civil War.

With the promulgation of the new constitution in 2015, a three-tier governance system was introduced, with national, provincial and local levels of governance. A Local Body Restructuring Commission was established as required by the constitution under the chairmanship of Balananda Paudel. The commission proposed 719 local structures which was revised to 753 by the government. The new local levels were formed by changing the existing cities and village development council and came into existence on 10 March 2017.

== Electoral system ==
Local levels will have a Chairperson/Mayor and a Deputy chairperson/mayor. Local levels are further subdivided into wards which will have a ward chairperson and 4 members. Out of the 4 members 2 must be female. All terms are for a total of 5 years. The elections are direct in nature and with the one getting the most ballots is declared the winner.

Local Level Type	Choice
Metropolitan City	One Mayor, One Deputy Mayor, One Ward Chairman, 4 Ward members
Sub Metropolitan City	One Mayor, One Deputy Mayor, One Ward Chairman, 4 Ward members
Municipality	One Mayor, One Deputy Mayor, One Ward Chairman, 4 Ward members
Rural Municipality	One Head, One Deputy Head, One Ward Chairman, 4 Ward members

== Results ==
=== Overall Results ===
Parties	Mayor/Chairman	Deputy Mayor/Chairman	Ward Chairman	Ward Member
Communist Party of Nepal (Unified Marxist-Leninist)	294	331	2,560	10,912
Nepali Congress	266	223	2,286	8,679
Communist Party of Nepal (Maoist Centre)	106	111	1,102	4,123
Federal Socialist Forum, Nepal	34	32	262	1,111
Rastriya Janata Party Nepal	25	30	195	862
Nepal Loktantrik Forum	9	8	88	356
Independents	6	5	91	131
Rastriya Prajatantra Party	5	7	59	214
Rastriya Janamorcha	3	4	33	146
Naya Shakti Party, Nepal	2	1	22	91
Nepali Janata Dal	2	0	7	30
Nepal Workers' and Peasants' Party	1	1	22	75
Bahujan Shakti Party	0	0	8	34
Rastriya Janamukti Party	0	0	3	17
Rastriya Prajatantra Party (Democratic)	0	0	2	5
Federal Democratic National Forum	0	0	1	6
Communist Party of Nepal (Marxist-Leninist)	0	0	1	3
Nepal Pariwar Dal	0	0	0	1
Total	753	753	6,742	26,790

=== Results by province ===
==== Province No. 1 ====
Parties	Mayor/Head	Deputy Mayor/Head	Ward Chair	Ward Member
Communist Party of Nepal (Unified Marxist-Leninist)	69	85	554	2511
Nepali Congress	51	38	418	1492
Communist Party of Nepal (Maoist Centre)	9	7	114	388
Nepal Loktantrik Forum	3	4	20	80
Rastriya Prajatantra Party	3	1	9	26
Federal Socialist Forum Nepal	2	2	28	106
Independents	0	0	8	10
Naya Shakti Party, Nepal	0	0	2	2
Federal Democratic National Forum	0	0	1	6
Rastriya Janamukti Party	0	0	1	4
Communist Party of Nepal (Marxist-Leninist)	0	0	1	0
Total	137	137	1,156	4,513
Source: Election Commission of Nepal

==== Province No. 2 ====
Parties	Mayor/Head	Deputy Mayor/Head	Ward Chair	Ward Member
Nepali Congress	40	35	338	1111
Federal Socialist Forum Nepal	26	25	191	815
Rastriya Janata Party Nepal	25	30	195	862
Communist Party of Nepal (Maoist Centre)	21	24	230	853
Communist Party of Nepal (Unified Marxist-Leninist)	18	19	230	983
Nepal Loktantrik Forum	3	3	32	128
Nepali Janata Dal	2	0	7	30
Naya Shakti Party, Nepal	1	0	5	16
Independents	0	0	32	26
Rastriya Prajatantra Party	0	0	6	22
Rastriya Janamukti Party	0	0	2	6
Rastriya Prajatantra Party (Democratic)	0	0	2	5
Bahujan Shakti Party	0	0	1	4
Total	136	136	1,271	5,075
Source: Election Commission of Nepal

==== Province No. 3 ====
Parties	Mayor/Head	Deputy Mayor/Head	Ward Chair	Ward Member
Communist Party of Nepal (Unified Marxist-Leninist)	64	69	537	2,333
Nepali Congress	35	32	367	1,324
Communist Party of Nepal (Maoist Centre)	16	17	176	660
Rastriya Prajatantra Party	1	1	15	43
Nepal Workers' and Peasants' Party	1	1	12	40
Naya Shakti Party, Nepal	1	0	5	24
Independents	0	0	7	6
Nepal Loktantrik Forum	0	0	2	3
Total	119	119	1,121	4,433
Source: Election Commission of Nepal

==== Province No. 4 ====
Parties	Mayor/Head	Deputy Mayor/Head	Ward Chair	Ward Member
Nepali Congress	44	37	342	1,351
Communist Party of Nepal (Unified Marxist-Leninist)	34	36	316	1,261
Communist Party of Nepal (Maoist Centre)	5	7	69	267
Rastriya Janamorcha	1	2	15	56
Independents	1	1	10	32
Rastriya Prajatantra Party	0	2	2	12
Naya Shakti Party, Nepal	0	0	5	24
Rastriya Janamukti Party	0	0	0	2
Total	85	85	759	3,005
Source: Election Commission of Nepal

==== Province No. 5 ====
Parties	Mayor/Head	Deputy Mayor/Head	Ward Chair	Ward Member
Communist Party of Nepal (Unified Marxist-Leninist)	43	47	355	1,498
Nepali Congress	33	31	317	1,223
Communist Party of Nepal (Maoist Centre)	19	22	181	692
Federal Socialist Forum, Nepal	6	5	43	190
Independents	3	0	21	44
Rastriya Janamorcha	2	2	18	89
Nepal Loktantrik Forum	2	0	19	76
Rastriya Prajatantra Party	1	1	17	65
Naya Shakti Party, Nepal	0	1	5	17
Bahujan Shakti Party	0	0	7	30
Rastriya Janamukti Party	0	0	0	5
Total	109	109	983	3,929
Source: Election Commission of Nepal

==== Province No. 6 ====
Parties	Mayor/Head	Deputy Mayor/Head	Ward Chair	Ward Member
Communist Party of Nepal (Unified Marxist-Leninist)	27	31	268	1,074
Communist Party of Nepal (Maoist Centre)	25	26	219	876
Nepali Congress	25	16	203	776
Independents	2	4	11	10
Rastriya Prajatantra Party	0	2	7	36
Nepal Workers' and Peasants' Party	0	0	10	35
Nepal Loktantrik Forum	0	0	0	1
Nepal Pariwar Dal	0	0	0	1
Rastriya Janamorcha	0	0	0	1
Total	79	79	718	2,810
Source: Election Commission of Nepal

==== Province No. 7 ====
Parties	Mayor/Head	Deputy Mayor/Head	Ward Chair	Ward Member
Communist Party of Nepal (Unified Marxist-Leninist)	39	44	300	1,249
Nepali Congress	38	34	301	1,192
Communist Party of Nepal (Maoist Centre)	10	9	113	400
Nepal Loktantrik Forum	1	1	15	68
Rastriya Prajatantra Party	0	0	3	10
Independents	0	0	2	3
Naya Shakti Party, Nepal	0	0	0	2
Total	88	88	734	2,924
Source: Election Commission of Nepal

== Cities ==
City	Mayor	Deputy Mayor
Kathmandu	Bidya Sundar Shakya (UML)	Hari Prabha Khadgi (NC)
Lalitpur	Chiri Babu Maharjan (NC)	Gita Satyal (NC)
Pokhara Lekhnath	Man Bahadur GC (UML)	Manju Devi Gurung (UML)
Bharatpur	Renu Dahal (MC)	Parbati Shah Thakuri (NC)
Hetauda	Hari Bahadur Mahat (UML)	Mina Kumari Lama (UML)
Ghorahi	Naru Lal Chaudhary (UML)	Sita Neupane (UML)
Nepalgunj	Dhawal Shamsher JBR (RPP)	Uma Thapa Magar (NC)
Butwal	Shiva Raj Subedi (UML)	Guma Devi Acharya (UML)
Tuslipur	Ghana Shyam Pandey (UML)	Maya Sharma (UML)
Itahari	Dwarik Lal Chaudhary (UML)	Laxmi Kumari Gautam (UML)
Dhangadhi	Nrip Bahadur Wad (NC)	Sushila Mishra (NC)
Biratnagar	Bheem Parajuli (NC)	Indira Karki (NC)
Dharan	Tara Subba (UML)	Manju Bhandari (UML)
Janakpur	Lal Kishore Shah (RJPN)	Rita Kumari Mishra (RJPN)
Jitpur Simara	Krishna Prasad Paudel (UML)	Saraswati Devi Chaudhary (UML)
Kalaiya	Rajesh Rae Yadav (NC)	Raheema Khatun (NC)
Birgunj	Vijay Kumar Sarawagi (FSFN)	Shanti Karki (NC)

== Incidents ==
The first phase of election was largely peaceful but there were sporadic instances of violence. A CPN-UML activist was killed in Gaurisankar Village Council, Dolakha on the eve of election. Another person was killed in Namobuddha municipality, Kavre on the day of election, the incident is still under investigation. One person died after security personnel opened fire during a clash between the cadres of Nepali Congress and CPN-UML in Melung Rural Municipality of Dolakha district on election day. A candidate from Rastriya Prajantantra Party died in Naraharinath Village Council, Kalikot after police opened fire when cadres of Netra Bikram Chand led CPN tried to capture the ballot boxes.

A reelection took place in one ward of Bharatpur after a CPN-Maoist Centre vote count representative tore 90 ballot papers when the count was in progress.

In the second phase, a UML cadre died after being hit by a stone in his testicles during a clash with Nepali Congress cadres at Chededaha Village council Bajura. A cadre of Netra Bikram Chand-led CPN Maoist died in Dhangadi, Kailali after a bomb carried by him exploded prematurely on June 26.
