= Ujwal Thapa =

Nepali politician (died 2021)

- उज्वल थापा
- Born: 1976 or 1977; Syangja District, Nepal
- Died: 1 June 2021 (aged 44); Lalitpur, Nepal
- Education: Bennington College,Budhanilkantha School
- Occupations: Youth leader, entrepreneur, social worker
- Political party: Bibeksheel Nepali, Bibeksheel Sajha Party

Ujwal Thapa (Nepali: उज्वल थापा; 7 January 1977 – 1 June 2021) was a Nepalese youth leader and activist, entrepreneur, and social worker. He was the president of the Bibeksheel Nepali party.

== Early life ==
Thapa was born as a first child to Udaya Bhadur Thapa and Shanta Thapa. He was educated at the Budhanilkantha School in Kathmandu, Nepal and finished his bachelor's degree at Bennington College in Vermont, USA in 2000.

== Career ==
Thapa ran as an independent candidate in the 2013 Nepalese Constituent Assembly election from Kathmandu Constituency Number 5.

He was the president of the Bibeksheel Nepali party which, under his leadership, staged protests at the Maitighar Mandala monument in support of the senior orthopaedic surgeon at Tribhuwan University Maharajganj Teaching Hospital Dr. Govinda K.C., who was on a fast-to-death protesting for reforms in the medical sector. Thapa also led a symbolic protest against members of the Legislature Parliament of Nepal at Baneshwor, Kathmandu, demanding affordable medical facilities for the citizens.

In 2002, Thapa started Digital Max Solutions, a website development and software branding business. With Chandra Maharzan and Sakin Shrestha, he founded the IT community WordPress Nepal. He also established Shangrila Coffee, a coffee farm in Syangja district in 2009. He helped start and run the entrepreneurial forum Entrepreneurs for Nepal. He also ran a personal blog called "Why Nepal?".

== Death ==
Thapa died on 1 June 2021, aged 44, due to post COVID-19 illness, while undergoing treatment at Mediciti Hospital of Lalitpur, according to a statement issued on behalf of his family and friends.
