= 2022 Kathmandu municipal election =

Local election in Nepal

2022 Kathmandu municipal elections
- 13 May 2022

162 seats to Kathmandu Metropolitan City Council 82 seats needed for a majority
- Turnout: 63.68% (▼9.04 pp)
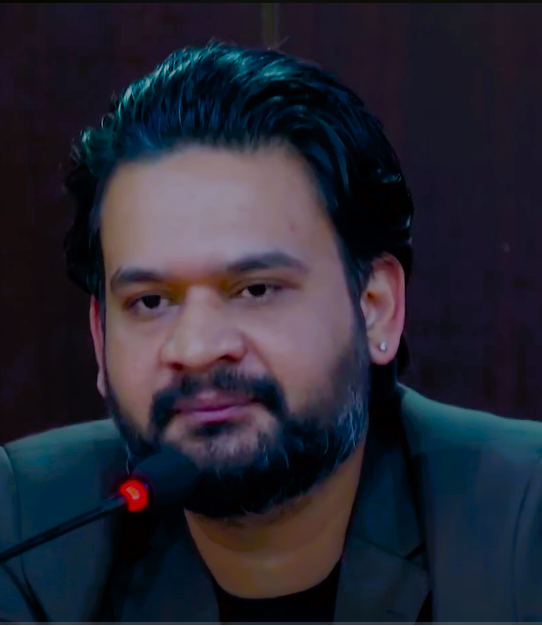

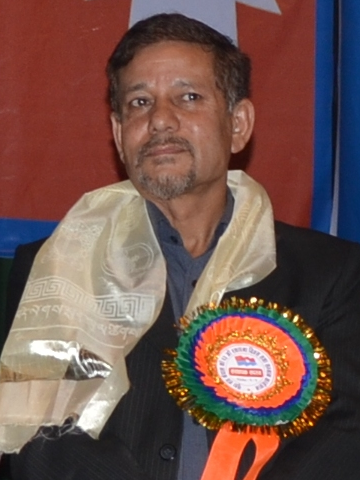
	First party	Second party	Third party
Leader	Balendra Shah	Sirjana Singh	Keshav Sthapit
Party	Independent	Congress	CPN (UML)
Seats won	–	93	61
Percentage	38.6%	24.0%	23.8%
- Percent vote share in mayoral election by ward
Mayor before election
Bidya Sundar Shakya
CPN (UML)
Elected Mayor
Balendra Shah
Independent

A municipal election for Kathmandu took place on 13 May 2022, with all 162 positions up for election across 32 wards. The electorate elected a mayor, a deputy mayor, 32 ward chairs and 128 ward members. An indirect election will also be held to elect five female members and an additional three female members from the Dalit and minority community to the municipal executive.

== Background ==
Kathmandu was established as a municipality in 1919. After the formulation of the 1951 Municipality Act, the first municipal elections were held in Nepal and Janakman Shrestha became the first elected mayor of Kathmandu. The municipality was declared as a metropolitan city in 1995 by then mayor Prem Lal Singh. Keshav Sthapit was the first elected mayor of Kathmandu after it had been declared as a metropolitan city. Electors in each ward elect a ward chair and four ward members, out of which two must be female and one of the two must belong to the Dalit community.

In the previous election, Bidhya Sundar Shakya from CPN (Unified Marxist–Leninist) was elected mayor.

== Candidates ==
=== CPN (Unified Marxist–Leninist) ===
The incumbent mayor Bidhya Sundar Shakya, announced in February 2022 that he would want to run for re-election if the party wanted him to. But on April 24 the party announced that it would field former mayor Keshav Sthapit as its candidate. Sthapit was first elected mayor in 1997 and was appointed mayor again in 2005 by then King Gyanendra. He was later also appointed as the commissioner of Kathmandu Valley Development Authority by Prime Minister Baburam Bhattarai, but was removed after only nine months. Sthapit was a member of the provincial assembly of Bagmati Province and previously served in the cabinet of Chief Minister Dormani Paudel but resigned to file his candidacy.

Sunita Dangol, a Newa heritage activist and former Miss Newa who had previously announced her intention to run as mayor as an independent was announced as the deputy mayor candidate from the party.

=== Nepali Congress ===
The Nepali Congress, CPN (Maoist Centre), CPN (Unified Socialist), People's Socialist Party, Nepal and Rastriya Janamorcha announced that they would jointly contest the local elections in some local units in the country.

Sirjana Singh of Nepali Congress was announced as the candidate of the alliance on April 25. She is married to former deputy Prime Minister and MP Prakash Man Singh. She is also a former chairperson of Nepal Woman Association.

Rameshwar Shrestha from the CPN (Unified Socialist) was announced as the candidate of deputy mayor from the alliance.

=== Balendra Shah ===
Rapper and structural engineer Balendra Shah announced his candidacy as an independent on 17 December 2021.

=== Other parties and candidates ===
Party	Mayor candidate	Notes	Deputy Mayor candidate	Notes
Rastriya Prajatantra Party	Madan Das Shrestha	Actor	Binita Magaiya	
Bibeksheel Sajha Party	Samikchya Baskota	Advocate and CEO of Baskota Group.	Kirti Tuladhar	JCI Nepal President 1999 & Past VP of JCI (2000)
Independent	Suman Sayami	Social Activist	Bidya Shrestha Maharjan	Social Activist & Teacher

== Opinion polls ==
Date	Pollster	Sample size	Shah	Sthapit	Singh	Shrestha	Sayami	Baskota	Undecided	Lead
Date	Pollster	Sample size	Ind	UML	Congress	RPP	Ind	BSP	Undecided	Lead
10 May 2022	Setopati	530	26.2%	24%	19.2%	7.4%	4.9%	3.8%	14.5%	2.2%

== Exit polls ==
Date	Pollster	Sample size (Revealed)	Shah	Singh	Sthapit	Sayami	Shrestha	Baskota	Unrevealed	Lead
Date	Pollster	Sample size (Revealed)	Ind	Congress	UML	Ind	RPP	BSP	Unrevealed	Lead
13 May 2022	Setopati	1350 (66%)	42%	25%	26%	4%	2.14%	0.518%	33%	16%

== Results ==
=== Mayoral election ===
Mayoral elections result
Party	Candidate	Votes	%	±%
Independent	Balendra Shah	61,767	38.63%	New entry
Congress	Sirjana Singh	38,341	23.98%	▲1.03%
CPN (UML)	Keshav Sthapit	38,117	23.84%	▼9.07%
Independent	Suman Sayami	13,770	8.61%	New entry
RPP	Madan Das Shrestha	5,770	3.61%	New entry
Bibeksheel Sajha	Samikchya Baskota	647	0.40%	New entry
Others		1,494	0.93%	
Total votes		159,906	100.0%	
Rejected ballots		31,280	16.36%	
Turnout		191,186	63.68%	−9.04%
Registered electors		300,242		▲10.70%
Independent gain from CPN (UML)		Swing	▲23.9%	

Deputy mayoral elections result
Party	Candidate	Votes	%	±%
CPN (UML)	Sunita Dangol	68,612	53.2%	New entry
Unified Socialist	Rameshwar Shrestha	23,806	18.5%	New entry
Independent	Bidhya Shrestha (Maharjan)	13,695	10.6%	New entry
RPP	Binita Magaiya	12,141	9.4%	▼8.27%
Independent	Benji Singh Maharjan	6,555	5.1%	New entry
Bibeksheel Sajha	Kirti Kansakar	2,590	2.0%	New entry
Others		1,576	1.2%	
Total votes		128,975	100.0%	
Rejected ballots		62,211	32.54%	
Turnout		191,186	63.68%	▼9.04%
Registered electors		300,242		▲10.7%
CPN (UML) gain from Congress		Swing	▲41.6%	

=== Ward results ===
Results for ward chair by party Nepali Congress CPN (Unified Marxist-Leninist) CPN (Unified Socialist)

Summary of Partywise Ward chairperson and Ward member seats won, 2022
Party	Chairperson	Members
Nepali Congress	19	74
CPN (Unified Marxist-Leninist)	12	48
CPN (Unified Socialist)	1	4
Total	32	126

==== Summary of results by ward ====
Ward #	Ward Chairman	Party	Ward			
Ward #	Ward Chairman	Party	Open	Open 2	Female	Female Dalit
1	Bharat Lal Shrestha	UML	NC	NC	UML	NC
2	Rajendra Kumar Shrestha	UML	UML	UML	UML	UML
3	Prem Thapa	UML	UML	UML	UML	UML
4	Dinesh Maharjan	UML	UML	UML	UML	UML
5	Birendra Prajapati	UML	NC	UML	NC	UML
6	Bhuwan Lama	NC	NC	NC	NC	NC
7	Bimal Kumar Hoda	NC	NC	NC	NC	NC
8	Asaman Sangat	NC	NC	NC	NC	NC
9	Ramji Bhandari	NC	UML	UML	UML	UML
10	Ram Kumar KC	NC	NC	NC	NC	NC
11	Hira Lal Tandukar	NC	NC	NC	NC	NC
12	Bal Krishna Maharjan	NC	NC	NC	NC	NC
13	Dhurba Narayan Manandhar	UML	UML	UML	UML	UML
14	Suman Shrestha	NC	NC	UML	UML	NC
15	Ishwor Man Dangol	US	US	US	US	US
16	Mukunda Rijal	NC	UML	UML	UML	UML
17	Nabin Manandhar	NC	NC	NC	NC	NC
18	Nhuchhe Kaji Maharjan	UML	UML	UML	UML	UML
19	Rajesh Kumar Shrestha	NC	NC	NC	NC	NC
20	Rajendra Manandhar	NC	NC	NC	NC	NC
21	Udaya Chudamani Bajracharya	UML	UML	UML	UML	UML
22	Chini Kaji Maharjan	UML	NC	NC	NC	UML
23	Macha Raja Maharjan	UML	NC	NC	UML	NC
24	Binod Kumar Rajbhandari	NC	UML	NC	NC	Vacant
25	Rajesh Dangol	NC	NC	NC	NC	Vacant
26	Khyam Raj Tiwari	NC	NC	NC	NC	NC
27	Yogesh Kumar Khadgi	NC	NC	NC	NC	UML
28	Bhai Ram Khadki Prakash	NC	NC	NC	NC	NC
29	Kush Dhakal	NC	NC	NC	NC	NC
30	Dal Bahadur Karki	NC	NC	NC	NC	NC
31	Saroj Dhakal	UML	NC	UML	UML	UML
32	Navraj Parajuli	UML	UML	UML	UML	UML

Note: 4 candidates (1 from Nepali Congress and 3 from CPN-UML) for Ward Members were elected unopposed under Dalit woman reserved seats. 2 Ward Member seats reserved for Dalit women were left unfilled due to lack of candidates

== Results for municipal executive election ==
The municipal executive consists of the mayor, who is also the chair of the municipal executive, the deputy mayor and ward chairs from each ward. The members of the municipal assembly elected five female members and three members from the Dalit or minority community to the municipal executive using single non-transferable vote.

=== Municipal Assembly composition ===
Party	Members
Nepali Congress	93
CPN (Unified Marxist–Leninist)	61
CPN (Unified Socialist)	5
Independent	1
Vacant	2
Total	162

=== Results ===
Category	Candidate	Party	Votes
Female Member	Mina Sunar	Nepali Congress	99
Female Member	Mina Singh	Nepali Congress	99
Female Member	Kanchana Nepali Harijan	Nepali Congress	97
Female Member	Lalita Khadgi	Nepali Congress	97
Female Member	Maiya Laxmi Maharjan	CPN (Unified Socialist)	99
Female Member	Sharmila Pariyar	CPN (Unified Marxist–Leninist)	61
Female Member	Sharada Subedi	CPN (Unified Marxist–Leninist)	61
Female Member	Shobha Karki	CPN (Unified Marxist–Leninist)	61
Female Member	Hira Devi Pokharel	CPN (Unified Marxist–Leninist)	60
Female Member	Herashobha Dangol	CPN (Unified Marxist–Leninist)	59
Dalit/Minority Member	Binod Achhami	Nepali Congress	98
Dalit/Minority Member	Mahesh Nepali	Nepali Congress	97
Dalit/Minority Member	Anita Karki Dholi	CPN (Maoist Centre)	95
Dalit/Minority Member	Keshav Bhujel	CPN (Unified Marxist–Leninist)	61
Dalit/Minority Member	Chandrakala Sundas	CPN (Unified Marxist–Leninist)	61
Dalit/Minority Member	Prem Pode Parajuli	CPN (Unified Marxist–Leninist)	62

=== Municipal Executive composition ===
Party	Members	+/–
Nepali Congress	25	▲10
CPN (Unified Marxist–Leninist)	13	▼14
CPN (Unified Socialist)	2	New
CPN (Maoist Centre)	1	▲1
Independent	1	▲1
Total	42	0

== See also ==
- Elections in Nepal
- 2022 Nepalese local elections
- 2022 Lalitpur municipal election
- 2017 Kathmandu municipal election
- 2022 Janakpur municipal election
- 2022 Bharatpur municipal election
