= Dangol =

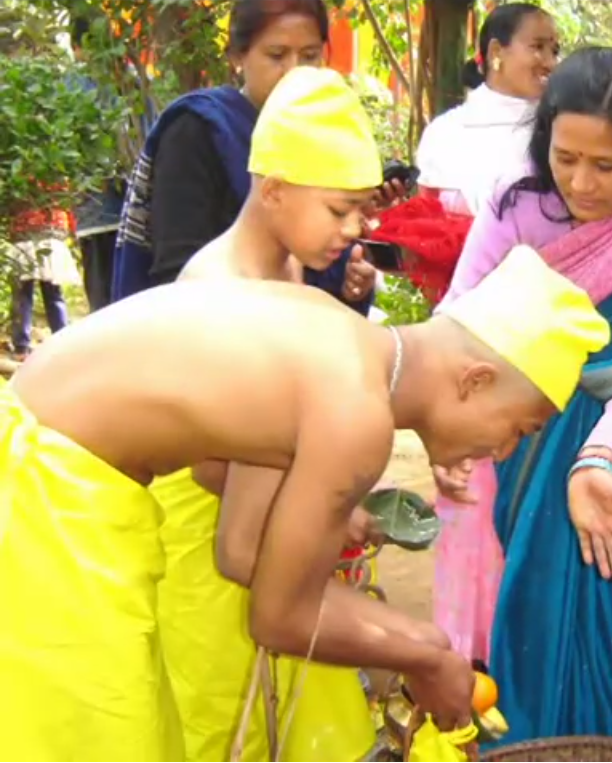
Male members perform keta puja

The Dangol or Dongol (Nepal Bhasa: डंगोल) clan are ethnic people in Newar community from Kathmandu Valley, predominantly found in Kathmandu, Nepal. They belong to the Jyapu (Nepal Bhasa: ज्यापू:) subcaste within the Newar family and are highly urbanized. In the olden times, they were farmers known for the knowledge of the measurement of land and calculation. Also, they have some distinct cultures and customs a bit different from other Newar traditions.

In order to protect the girl from being a widow, who is looked down upon by the rest of Nepal. If the woman's husband dies, she is still technically married to the sun and can hence not be called a widow.

== Prominent people ==
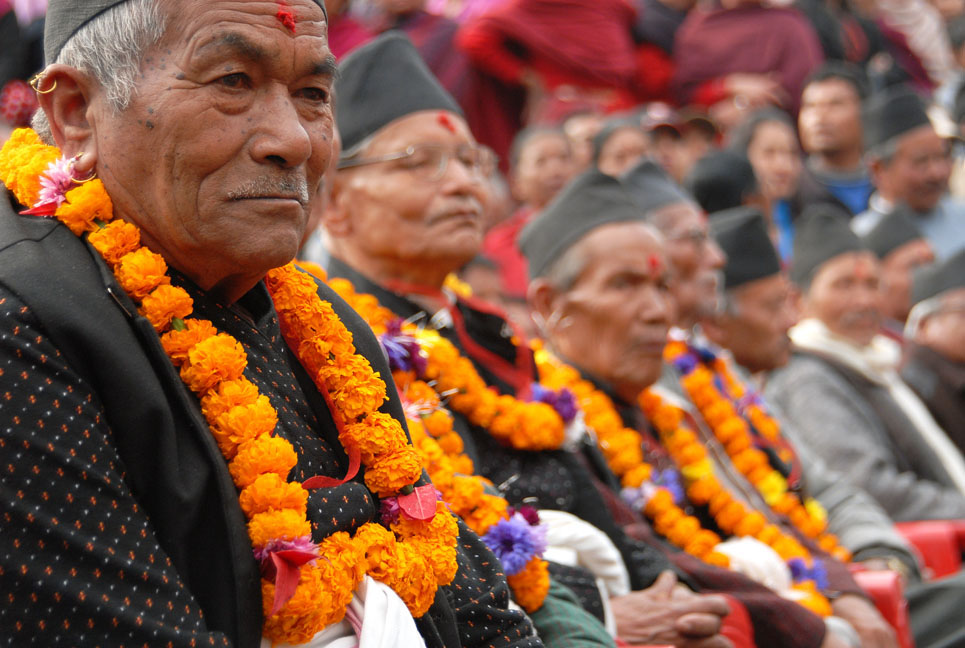
Jyapu people

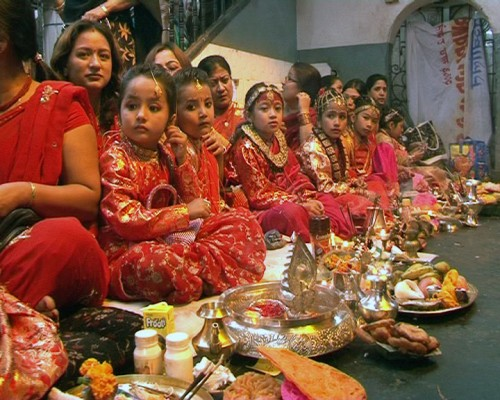
Female members perform Ihi

- Sunita Dangol (14th Deputy Mayor of Kathmandu)
- Sarbottam Dangol (Nepali politician, Unified Communist Party of Nepal (Maoist))
- Tirtha Ram Dangol (Nepali Congress)
- Labib Dangol (Director of Accounting Operations, Defense Advanced Research Projects Agency (DARPA))
- Anjana Dongol (Associate Professor, Kathmandu University School of Medical Sciences)
- Madan Kumar Dangol, M.A.,LL.M.(Commercial Law), Advocate of Supreme Court with more than 32 years' of experience and authorized translator notary public and President of Lions Club of Kathmandu, Bright Future
- Avinash Dangol ( World Newah Organization Poland Chapter)

== See also ==
- Newar caste system
- Maharjan,
