= Kathmandu 8 =

Parliamentary constituency in Nepal

- Parliamentary constituency for the House of Representatives
- Kathmandu 8 in Bagmati Province

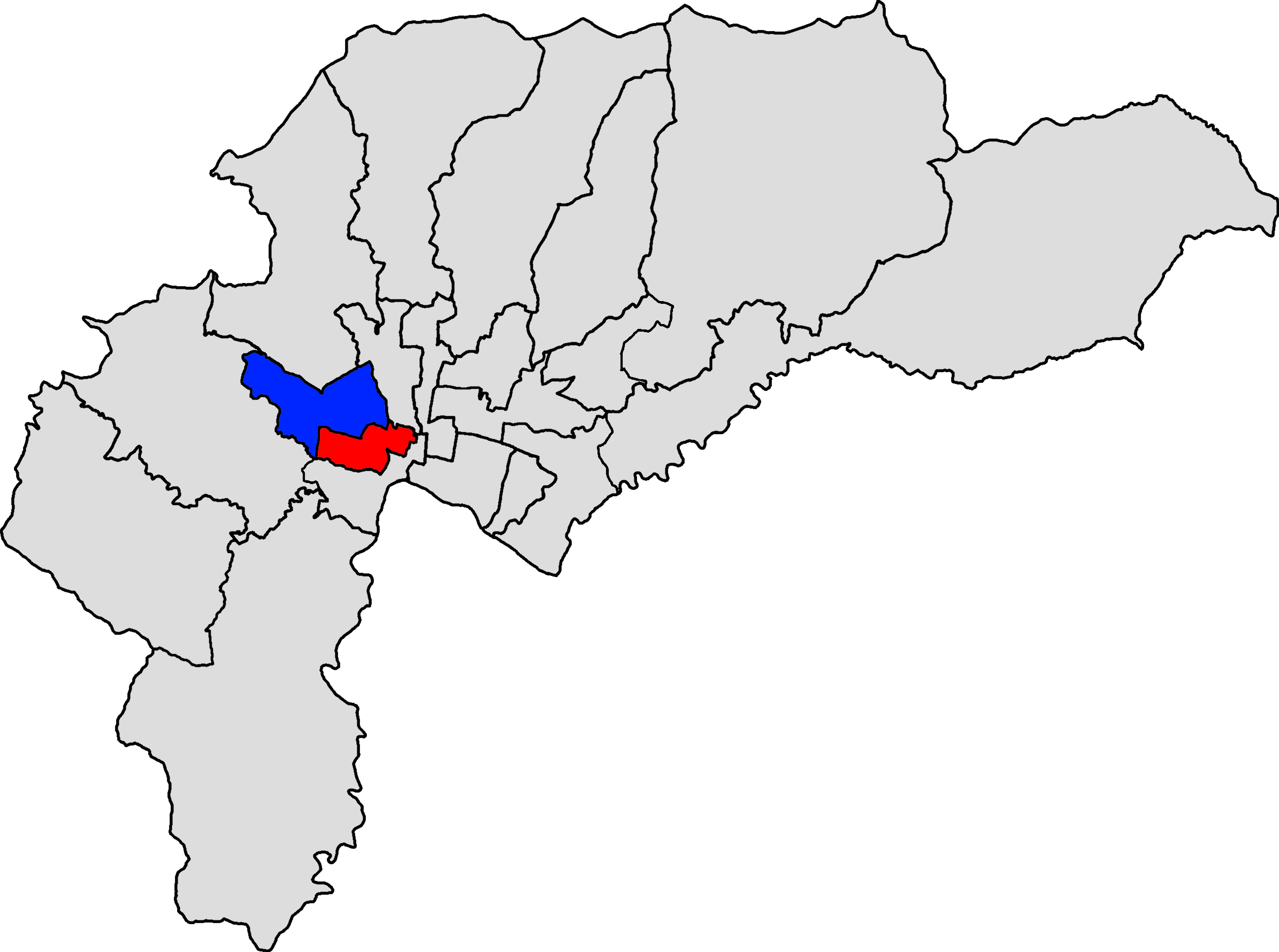
- Assembly segment Kathmandu 8(A) (red) and Kathmandu 8(B) (blue) within Kathmandu District
- Province: Bagmati Province
- District: Kathmandu District
- Electorate: 50,088

Current constituency
- Created: 2008
- Party: Rastriya Swatantra Party
- Member of Parliament: Biraj Bhakta Shrestha

Kathmandu 8 is one of 10 parliamentary constituencies of Kathmandu District in Nepal. This constituency came into existence on the Constituency Delimitation Commission (CDC) report submitted on 31 August 2017.

== Incorporated areas ==
Kathmandu 8 parliamentary constituency consists of wards 13, 15, 19, 20, 23 and 24 of Kathmandu Metropolitan City and wards 4 and 5 of Nagarjun Municipality.

== Assembly segments ==
It encompasses the following Bagmati Province Provincial Assembly segment

- Kathmandu 8(A)
- Kathmandu 8(B)

== Members of Parliament ==
=== Parliament/Constituent Assembly ===
Election	Member	Party
2008	Nabindra Raj Joshi	Nepali Congress
2017	Jeevan Ram Shrestha	CPN (Unified Marxist–Leninist)
May 2018	Jeevan Ram Shrestha	Nepal Communist Party
March 2021	Jeevan Ram Shrestha	CPN (Unified Marxist–Leninist)
August 2021	Jeevan Ram Shrestha	CPN (Unified Socialist)
2022	Biraj Bhakta Shrestha	Rastriya Swatantra Party
2026	Biraj Bhakta Shrestha	Rastriya Swatantra Party

=== Provincial Assembly ===
==== 8(A) ====
Election	Member	Party
2017	Rajesh Shakya	CPN (Unified Marxist–Leninist)
May 2018	Rajesh Shakya	Nepal Communist Party

==== 8(B) ====
Election	Member	Party
2017	Astha Laxmi Sakya	CPN (Unified Marxist–Leninist)
May 2018	Astha Laxmi Sakya	Nepal Communist Party

== Election results ==
=== Election in the 2020s ===
==== 2026 general election ====
Candidate	Party	Votes	%
Biraj Bhakta Shrestha	Rastriya Swatantra Party	24,592	67.54
Suman Sayami	Nepali Communist Party	3,217	8.83
Sapana Raj Bhandari	Nepali Congress	2,835	7.79
Nabin Shahi	Rastriya Prajatantra Party	1,909	5.24
Rajesh Shakya	CPN (UML)	1,909	5.24
Others		1,951	5.36
Total		36,413	100.00
Majority		21,375	
Rastriya Swatantra Party hold			

==== 2022 general election ====
Candidate	Party	Votes	%
Biraj Bhakta Shrestha	Rastriya Swatantra Party	10,112	32.97
Suman Sayami	Hamro Nepali Party	6,179	20.14
Jeevan Ram Shrestha	CPN (Unified Socialist)	4,881	15.91
Prakash Rimal	Rastriya Prajatantra Party	4,388	14.31
Shiva Sundar Rajvaidya	CPN (UML)	3,891	12.69
Others		1,223	3.99
Total		30,674	100.00
Majority		3,933	
Rastriya Swatantra Party gain			

=== Election in the 2010s ===
==== 2017 legislative elections ====
Party	Candidate	Votes
CPN (Unified Marxist–Leninist)	Jeevan Ram Shrestha	13,397
Nepali Congress	Nabindra Raj Joshi	12,963
Bibeksheel Sajha Party	Pukar Bam	4,414
Others		1,327
Invalid votes		9,80
Result	CPN (UML) gain	
Source: Election Commission

==== 2017 Nepalese provincial elections ====
===== Kathmandu 8(A) =====
Party	Candidate	Votes
CPN (Unified Marxist–Leninist)	Rajesh Shakya	7,780
Nepali Congress	Rajya Laxmi Shrestha	6,176
Bibeksheel Sajha Party	Anil Tuladhar	3,257
Others		1,507
Invalid votes		439
Result	CPN (UML) gain	
Source: Election Commission

===== Kathmandu 8(B) =====
Party	Candidate	Votes
CPN (Unified Marxist–Leninist)	Astha Laxmi Sakya	5,169
Nepali Congress	Dev Ratna Dangol	3,669
Rastriya Prajatantra Party	Prakash Rimal	2,621
Bibeksheel Sajha Party	Shyam Krishna Shakya	1,273
Others		542
Invalid votes		345
Result	CPN (UML) gain	
Source: Election Commission

==== 2013 Constituent Assembly election ====
Party	Candidate	Votes
Nepali Congress	Nabindra Raj Joshi	13,774
CPN (Unified Marxist–Leninist)	Jeevan Ram Shrestha	6,367
Rastriya Prajatantra Party Nepal	Prakash Rimal	4,938
UCPN (Maoist)	Mukti Narayan Pradhan	2,765
Federal Socialist Party, Nepal	Pabitra Bajracharya	2,492
Nepa Rastriya Party	Naresh Bir Shakya	1,556
Others		2,391
Result	Congress hold	
Source: Election Commission

=== Election in the 2000s ===
==== 2008 Constituent Assembly election ====
Party	Candidate	Votes
Nepali Congress	Nabindra Raj Joshi	11,005
CPN (Unified Marxist–Leninist)	Astha Laxmi Sakya	6,878
CPN (Maoist)	Sarbottam Dangol	6,573
Nepa Rastriya Party	Naresh Bir Shakya	3,975
Rastriya Prajatantra Party Nepal	Bikram Bahadur Thapa	2,093
Others		2,424
Invalid votes		1,550
Result	Congress gain	
Source: Election Commission

== See also ==
- List of parliamentary constituencies of Nepal
