= Begging (Prohibition) Act, 1962 =

Law in Nepal

The Begging (Prohibition) Act, 1962 is a piece of Nepalese legislation. It was passed on by Parliament on 11 April 1962 and prohibits people from begging or encouraging children who are under the age of 16 to beg. The law came into effect in 2018. If a person is caught breaking the law, they can be fined up to रू70 Nepali rupees (NPR) (equivalent to US$0.55 in 2020) or face imprisonment for three months.

The act will not apply to someone if "it requires begging alms as per the religious rites and rituals or custom in any festival, or religious ceremony or festivity". When a person makes a complaint and fails to give sufficient evidence to prove they are guilty, they might be fined up to रू40 NPR (equivalent to US$0.30 in 2020), or be jailed for about one and a half months or both. The act's preamble reads: "Whereas, it is expedient to prohibit the tradition of beggary in order to maintain good conduct and morality of general public".

In 2014, there were about 5,000 beggars in the capital of Nepal. In 2019, Kathmandu Metropolitan City's mayor Bidya Sundar Shakya made an announcement to shelter vagabonds and homeless people in ashrams located in Kathmandu to make the streets free from beggars. In 2014, Dipak Bayalkoti of The Kathmandu Post wrote that by not enforcing this act, it created a rapid population of beggars, especially in Kathmandu. In 2017, the Act Relating to Rights of Persons with Disabilities, 2074 listed that "no person shall engage a person with [a] disability in begging". In August 2018, the Government of Nepal passed a new version of the Criminal Code and Criminal Procedures Code that bans people from begging and encouraging someone to beg in the streets. The charges include being jailed for one month to a year to someone if they are found begging in public areas.
