= Kathmandu 6 =

Parliamentary constituency in Nepal

- Parliamentary constituency for the House of Representatives
- Kathmandu 6 in Bagmati Province

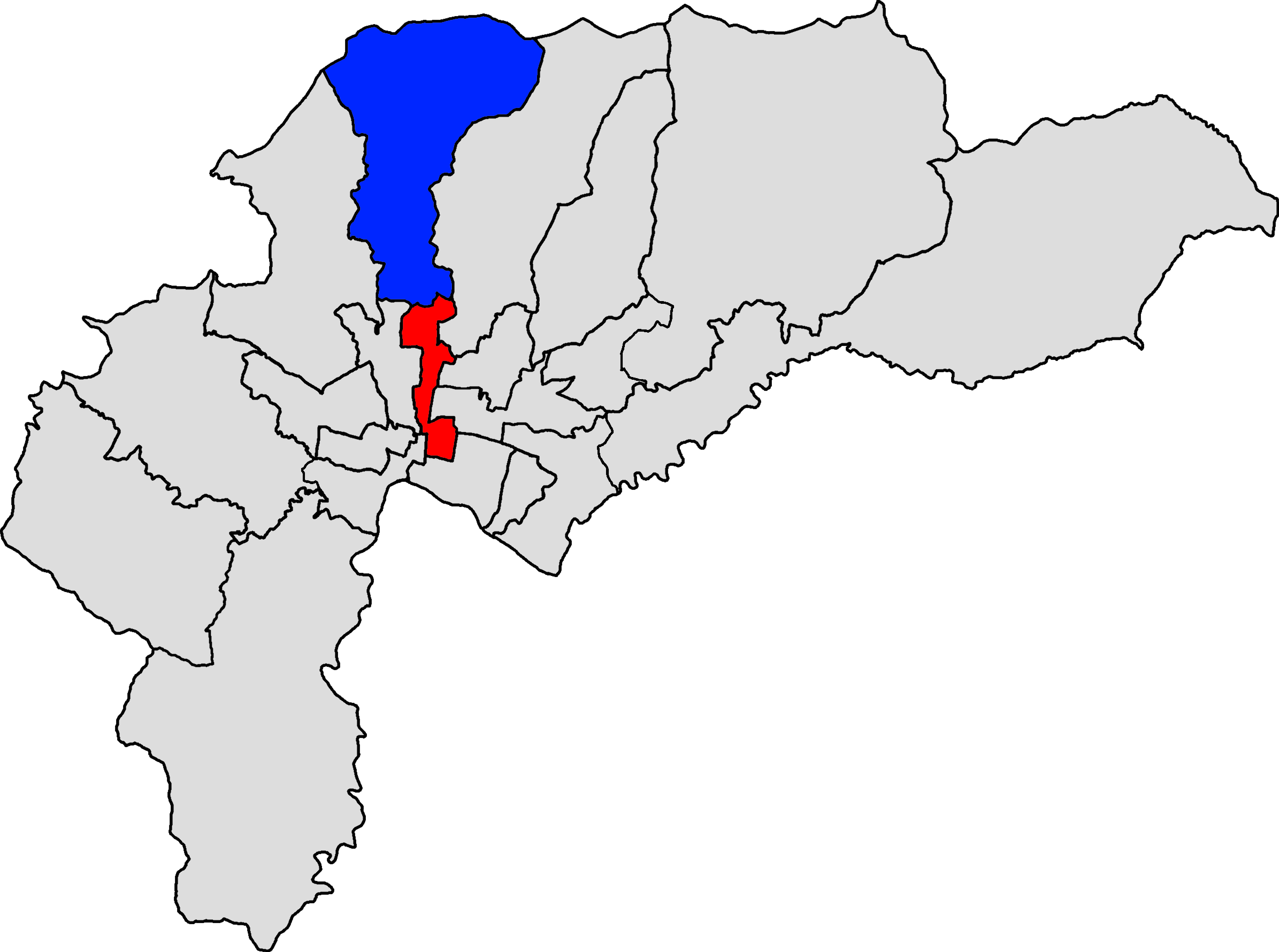
- Assembly segment Kathmandu 6(A) (red) and Kathmandu 6(B) (blue) within Kathmandu District
- Province: Bagmati Province
- District: Kathmandu District
- Electorate: 58,187

Current constituency
- Created: 1994
- Party: Rastriya Swatantra Party
- Member of Parliament: Shishir Khanal

Kathmandu 6 is one of 10 parliamentary constituencies of Kathmandu District in Nepal. This constituency came into existence on the Constituency Delimitation Commission (CDC) report submitted on 31 August 2017.

== Incorporated areas ==
Kathmandu 6 parliamentary constituency consists of wards 26, 27 and 28 of Kathmandu Metropolitan City, wards 1, 8, 9, 10 and 11 of Tokha Municipality and wards 1, 2, 6, 7, 8, 9, 10 and 11 of Tarakeshwar Municipality.

== Assembly segments ==
It encompasses the following Bagmati Province Provincial Assembly segment

- Kathmandu 6(A)
- Kathmandu 6(B)

== Members of Parliament ==
=== Parliament/Constituent Assembly ===
Election	Member	Party
1994	Sahana Pradhan	CPN (Unified Marxist–Leninist)
March 1998	Sahana Pradhan	CPN (Marxist–Leninist)
1999	Astha Laxmi Sakya	CPN (Unified Marxist–Leninist)
2008	Hit Man Shakya	CPN (Maoist)
January 2009	Hit Man Shakya	UCPN (Maoist)
2013	Bhimsen Das Pradhan	Nepali Congress
2022	Shishir Khanal	Rastriya Swatantra Party
2026	Shishir Khanal	Rastriya Swatantra Party

=== Provincial Assembly ===
==== 6(A) ====
Election	Member	Party
2017	Keshav Sthapit	CPN (Unified Marxist–Leninist)
May 2018	Keshav Sthapit	Nepal Communist Party

==== 6(B) ====
Election	Member	Party
2017	Yogendra Raj Sangroula	CPN (Unified Marxist–Leninist)
May 2018	Yogendra Raj Sangroula	Nepal Communist Party

== Election results ==
=== Election in the 2020s ===
==== 2026 general election ====
Candidate	Party	Votes	%
Shishir Khanal	Rastriya Swatantra Party	27,916	61.98
Krishna Baniya Chhetri	Nepali Congress	6,751	14.99
Aman Kumar Maskey	CPN (UML)	4,518	10.03
Uddav Raj Bhetuwal	Rastriya Prajatantra Party	1,321	2.93
Hem Lal Sharma	Nepali Communist Party	1,260	2.80
Others		3,276	7.27
Total		45,042	100.00
Majority		21,165	
Rastriya Swatantra Party hold			

==== 2022 general election ====
Candidate	Party	Votes	%
Shishir Khanal	Rastriya Swatantra Party	14,221	38.01
Sarbendra Khanal	CPN (UML)	8,917	23.84
Bhimsen Das Pradhan	Nepali Congress	8,812	23.55
Bishnu Prasad Acharya	Rastriya Prajatantra Party	2,185	5.84
Others		3,276	8.76
Total		37,411	100.00
Majority		5,304	
Rastriya Swatantra Party gain			

=== Election in the 2010s ===
==== 2017 legislative elections ====
Party	Candidate	Votes
Nepali Congress	Bhimsen Das Pradhan	16,785
CPN (Maoist Centre)	Jhakku Prasad Subedi	15,485
Bibeksheel Sajha Party	Ramesh Chiluwal	4,225
Others		2,773
Invalid votes		1,187
Result	Congress hold	
Source: Election Commission

==== 2017 Nepalese provincial elections ====
===== Kathmandu 6(A) =====
Party	Candidate	Votes
CPN (Unified Marxist–Leninist)	Keshav Sthapit	8,022
Nepali Congress	Nhuchhe Narayan Manandhar	5,149
Bibeksheel Sajha Party	Bimala Devi Adhikari Ghimire	2,301
Others		1,025
Invalid votes		358
Result	CPN (UML) gain	
Source: Election Commission

===== Kathmandu 6(B) =====
Party	Candidate	Votes
CPN (Unified Marxist–Leninist)	Yogendra Raj Sangroula	12,812
Nepali Congress	Bishnu Bhakta Timilsina	7,914
Bibeksheel Sajha Party	Ajit Khadka	1,354
Others		1,022
Invalid votes		469
Result	CPN (UML) gain	
Source: Election Commission

==== 2013 Constituent Assembly election ====
Party	Candidate	Votes
Nepali Congress	Bhimsen Das Pradhan	14,151
CPN (Unified Marxist–Leninist)	Yogesh Bhattarai	12,874
UCPN (Maoist)	Hem Lal Sharma	5,945
Rastriya Prajatantra Party Nepal	Sanjay Man Shrestha	2,385
Federal Socialist Party, Nepal	Keshav Sthapit	1,050
Others		2,821
Result	Congress gain	
Source: Election Commission

=== Election in the 2000s ===
==== 2008 Constituent Assembly election ====
Party	Candidate	Votes
CPN (Maoist)	Hit Man Shakya	10,768
Nepali Congress	Bhimsen Das Pradhan	10,058
CPN (Unified Marxist–Leninist)	Yogesh Bhattarai	9,089
Nepa Rastriya Party	Subarna Kesari Chitrakar	1,320
Others		3,779
Invalid votes		1,469
Result	Maoist gain	
Source: Election Commission

=== Election in the 1990s ===
==== 1999 legislative elections ====
Party	Candidate	Votes
CPN (Unified Marxist–Leninist)	Astha Laxmi Shakya	16,307
Nepali Congress	Marshal Julum Shakya	14,107
Rastriya Prajatantra Party	Jog Mehar Shrestha	7,166
CPN (Marxist–Leninist)	Sahana Pradhan	5,129
Others		2,149
Invalid Votes		1,041
Result	CPN (UML) hold	
Source: Election Commission

==== 1994 legislative elections ====
Party	Candidate	Votes
CPN (Unified Marxist–Leninist)	Sahana Pradhan	18,466
Nepali Congress	Damodar Gautam	10,615
Rastriya Prajatantra Party	Jog Mehar Shrestha	9,867
Others		1,655
Result	CPN (UML) hold	
Source: Election Commission

== See also ==
- List of parliamentary constituencies of Nepal
