= 2017 Kathmandu municipal election =

Local election in Nepal

2017 Kathmandu municipal elections
- 14 May 2017

162 seats to Kathmandu Metropolitan City Council 82 seats needed for a majority

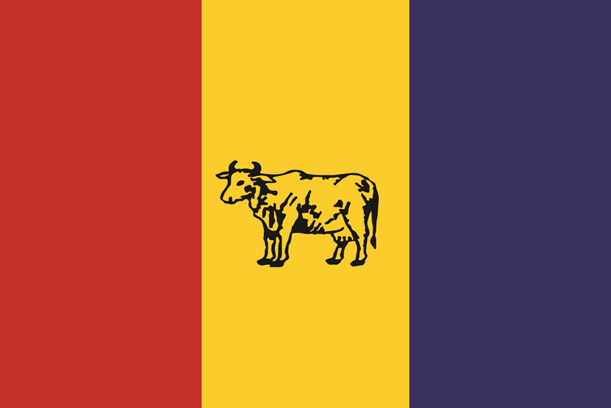
	First party	Second party	Third party
Party	CPN (UML)	Congress	RPP
Seats won	93	65	1
Percentage	57.4%	40.1%	0.6%
Council control before election
RPP
Rajram Shrestha
before Mayor
Council control after election
CPN (UML)
Bidya Sundar Shakya
Elected Mayor

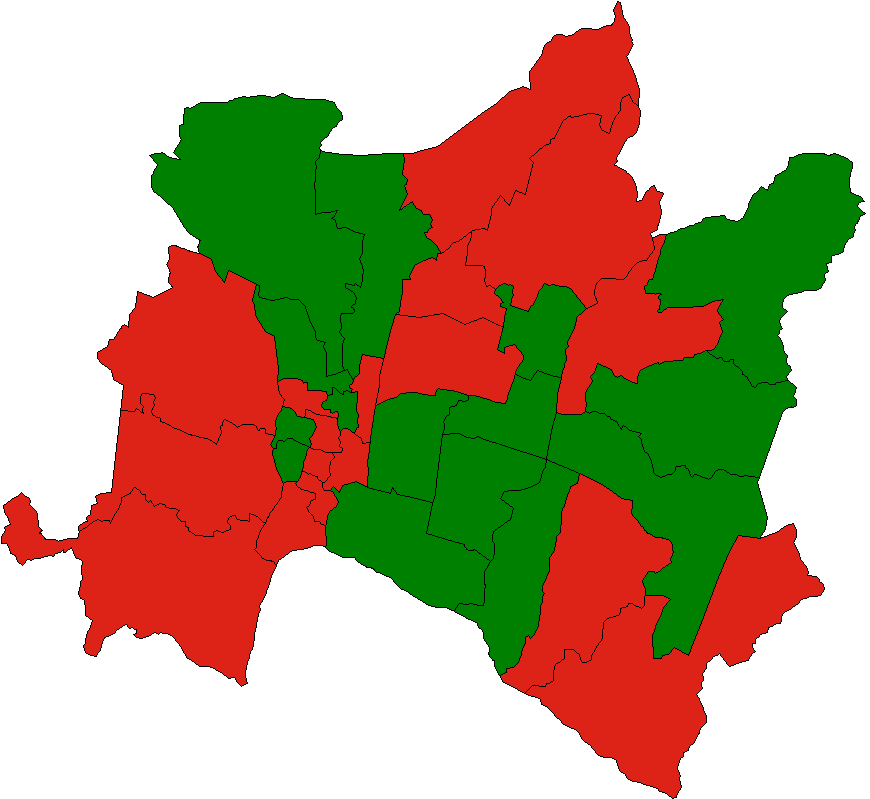
party colour of winning ward chairman

Municipal election for Kathmandu, capital of Nepal was held on May 14, 2017, for the position of Mayor, a Deputy Mayor, 32 Ward Chairmen and Ward Members. All positions are for a period of 5 years. A secondary election is to be held for municipal executive which will elect 5 women from the elected ward members and 3 members who must be from the Dalit and minority community. The electorate for this election will the 159 members chosen direct election.

== Background ==
Elections were last held in 2006 and since then the city has been without an elected executive. With the passing of a new constitution, a commission was formed to restructure the existing local levels into more powerful and autonomous local bodies. The city limits of Kathmandu remained unchanged during this restructuring but the number of wards was decreased from 35 to 32. Electors in each ward will elect a ward chairman and 4 ward members. Out of 4 ward members, 2 must be female and one of the 2 females must belong to the Dalit community.

== Issues ==
- Pollution
- Transport Infrastructure
- Urban Planning & Development
- Earthquake Reconstruction

== Candidates for Mayoral Election ==
=== Bidya Sundar Shakya ===
Shakya is a former ward chairman and will be supported by Rastriya Prajatantra Party in exchange for support to the Deputy-mayor candidate Rajaram Shrestha. Shakya is the current secretary of CPN-UML's Kathmandu District Committee. He won the ward chairperson post in then Ward No. 21 in 1992 and 1997 local elections. Remarks to his work ethics, He is believed to be one of the most corrupted politician. He have also been widely criticized for his disregards to health care workers during covid and one of the laziest mayor assigned in the history of Kathmandu. After his term ended, the citizens of Nepal united to chant the change of "Never Again".

=== Sarbottam Dangol ===
Sarbottam Dangol is a former student leader who was detained for two years without charge or trial in 1985, including two months of incommunicado detention. He took part in Constituent Assembly Election, 2008 as a candidate from Kathmandu Constituency no. 8 and became third with 6,573 votes.

=== Kishor Thapa ===
Thapa is a former civil servant who retired from the post of Secretary. He is currently standing as an independent candidate but is associated with Sajha Party Nepal founded by former BBC reporter Rabindra Mishra.

=== Ranju Neupane (Ranju Darsana) ===
Neupane is a central committee member and media coordinator of Bibeksheel Nepali party. She was elected as central member by first general convention of the party in late 2015.

== Mayoral Results ==
Summary of Kathmandu mayoral election, 2017
Party	Candidate	Votes	%
CPN (Unified Marxist–Leninist)	Bidya Sundar Shakya	64,913	32.91
Nepali Congress	Raju Raj Joshi	45,269	22.95
Bibeksheel Nepali	Ranju Darshana	23,439	11.88
Independent	Kishore Thapa	18,496	9.38
Communist Party of Nepal (Maoist Centre)	Sarbottam Dangol	7,906	4.01
Naya Shakti	Pabitra Bajracharya	6,050	3.07
Others		1,213	0.62
Invalid/blank votes		29,941	15.18
Total		197,227	100
Registered voters/turnout		271,221	72.72

Summary of Kathmandu deputy-mayoral election, 2017
Party	Candidate	Votes	%
Nepali Congress	Hari Prabha Khadgi	58,952	29.89
Rastriya Prajatantra Party	Raja Ram Shrestha	34,854	17.67
Independent	Nirupama Yadav	11,533	5.85
Communist Party of Nepal (Maoist Centre)	Sushila Kumari Poudel	10,448	5.30
Naya Shakti	Sabina Aryal (Dawadi)	3,493	1.77
Others		1,483	0.75
Invalid/blank votes		76,464	38.77
Total		197,227	100
Registered voters/turnout		271,221	72.72

== Ward results ==
Summary of Partywise Ward chairman and Ward member seats won, 2017
Party	Chairman	Members
CPN (Unified Marxist–Leninist)	18	74
Nepali Congress	14	50
Rastriya Prajatantra Party	0	1
Total	32	125

3 candidates (2 from Nepali Congress and 1 from CPN-UML) for Ward Members were elected unopposed under Dalit woman reserved seats. 3 Ward Member seats reserved for Dalit women were left unfilled due to lack of candidates.

=== Results by ward ===
Position	1	2	3	4	5	6	7	8	9	10	11	12	13	14	15	16	17	18	19	20	21	22	23	24	25	26	27	28	29	30	31	32
Ward Chairman																																
Ward Member																																
Ward Member																																
Female Member																																
Female Dalit Member																																
Source: Election Commission

== See also ==
- 2017 Nepalese local elections
- 1953 Kathmandu municipal election
- 2017 Lalitpur municipal election
