= Integration of UPI (India) and NPI (Nepal) =

Bilateral remittances between India and Nepal

- Short name: UPI-NPI linkage
- Location: India and Nepal
- Launched: 7 June 2026
- Currency: Indian and Nepali Rupees

The integration of UPI (India) and NPI (Nepal) refers to the linking of the payment interfaces of the countries India and Nepal for allowing cross-border remittances between the citizens of both nations. It gives access to the people of the both nations to remit funds uninterruptedly between the two countries. It was launched to deepen the financial connectivity between the two culturally tied nations. The aim of the linking is to make the historical, cultural, and economic ties between the two nations stronger forever. It is a bilateral financial relation between the two countries India and Nepal for cross-border digital payments. The agreement of linking the two digital payment interfaces of the both nations, is to fulfill faster remittances between the two countries.

The linkage between UPI and NPI was launched jointly by the two external affairs ministers S Jaishankar and Shishir Khanal of India and Nepal respectively. It was launched on 7 June 2026 in New Delhi, during the official visit of the external affairs minister Shishir Khanal of Nepal, in India. The integration of the two payment interfaces of the both nations was launched to facilitating cross-border personal remittances.

== Description ==
The service of UPI-NPI linkage was established through the technical integration of the Nepal Clearing House Limited (NCHI) and the National Payments Corporation of India (NPCI).

In the first phase, the service is open for person to person fund transfers, in which initially the migrant citizens of the both nations are eligible for the service.

== History ==
On 15 February 2024, the central banks Reserve Bank of India and Nepal Rashtra Bank of the two nations, signed a pact for the linkage of UPI and NPI.

In the collaboration of the two central banks, the terms of reference to integrate the fast payments systems of the both countries were finalised. After that the pact for the integration of the UPI-NPI systems was signed between the two central banks Reserve Bank of India and Nepal Rashtra Bank. The integration aims to enables instant and low-cost fund transfers between the users of the two systems.
