= Prem Lal Singh =

Nepali politician (1936 or 1937 – 2024)

House of Representatives of Nepal
- In office 1999–2008
- Preceded by: Padma Ratna Tuladhar
- Succeeded by: Suprabha Ghimire
- Constituency: Kathmandu 4

11th Mayor of Kathmandu
- In office 1992–1997
- Deputy: Nabindra Raj Joshi
- Preceded by: Haribol Bhattarai
- Succeeded by: Keshav Sthapit

Personal details
- Born: 1936 or 1937 Kathmandu, Nepal
- Died: 16 December 2024 (aged 87)
- Party: Nepali Congress
- Occupation: Politician

Prem Lal Singh (Nepal Bhasa/Nepali:प्रेमलाल सिंह; 1936 or 1937 – 16 December 2024) was a Nepalese politician. He was elected to the Pratinidhi Sabha in the 1999 election on behalf of the Nepali Congress. Singh died from stomach disease on 16 December 2024, at the age of 87.
