= Sunita Dangol =

Acting Deputy Mayor of Kathmandu

Mayor of Kathmandu
- Acting
- Assumed office 18 January 2026
- Deputy: Herself
- Preceded by: Balendra Shah

Deputy Mayor of Kathmandu
- Incumbent
- Assumed office 30 May 2022
- Mayor: Balendra Shah
- Preceded by: Hariprabha Khadgi

Personal details
- Born: 18 May 1993 (age 33) Kathmandu, Nepal
- Party: CPN (UML)
- Parents: Satu Dangol (father); Sangita Dangol (mother)
- Education: MA Social Work (TU); Bsc. Biotechnology (SANN Int'l College, PU)
- Profession: Activist; Politician

Sunita Dangol (Nepali: सुनिता डंगोल, born 18 May 1993) is a Nepalese politician, Newar heritage conservationist, language activist, and media professional. She is currently serving as the acting deputy mayor of Kathmandu metropolitan city, the capital city of Nepal since 18 January 2026, following the resignation of Mayor Balendra Shah. She assumed office of deputy mayor on 30 May 2022, under mayor Shah.

== Career ==
=== Early career ===
Dangol began her public career through beauty pageants and won Miss Newa in 2011. She later worked as a radio and television presenter and became involved in education and public speaking.

Dangol has also been involved in the promotion and preservation of Nepal Bhasa, Ranjana script and Newar cultural heritage. She worked with Callijatra and participated in language and script education programmes.

=== Political career ===
Dangol joined the Communist Party of Nepal (CPN-UML) and was selected as its candidate for Deputy Mayor of Kathmandu in the 2022 Nepalese local elections. She was elected with 68,612 votes and took office on 30 May 2022.

As deputy mayor, Dangol has worked on municipal administration, cultural affairs, youth programmes and other local government activities. She has served alongside independent Mayor Balendra Shah.

Dangol has served as Acting Mayor of Kathmandu since January 2026 after Shah resigned as mayor to take a leading role in the Rastriya Swatatra Party (RSP) for the 2026 Nepalese general election.

== 2022 Kathmandu municipal election ==
Dangol initially declared her candidacy for the position of Mayor as an independent candidate for the 2022 Kathmandu municipal election. However, she joined the CPN (UML) and competed for the position of deputy mayor with Keshav Sthapit in the mayor's post. She was elected with 68,612 votes while Rameshwar Shrestha of the coalition's Unified Socialists polled 23,806 votes.

Deputy mayoral elections result
Party	Candidate	Votes	%	±%
CPN (UML)	Sunita Dangol	68,612	53.2%	New
Unified Socialist	Rameshwar Shrestha	23,806	18.5%	New
Independent	Bidhya Shrestha (Maharjan)	13,695	10.6%	New
RPP	Binita Magaiya	12,141	9.4%	−8.3%
Independent	Benji Singh Maharjan	6,555	5.1%	New
Bibeksheel Sajha	Kirti Kansakar	2,590	2.0%	New
Others		1,576	1.2%	
Total votes		128,975	100.0%	
Rejected ballots		62,211	32.54%	
Turnout		191,186	63.68%	−9.04%
Registered electors		300,242		+10.7%
CPN (UML) gain from Congress		Swing	+41.6%	
