= Jeevan Ram Shrestha =

Nepali politician

- जीवन राम श्रेष्ठ
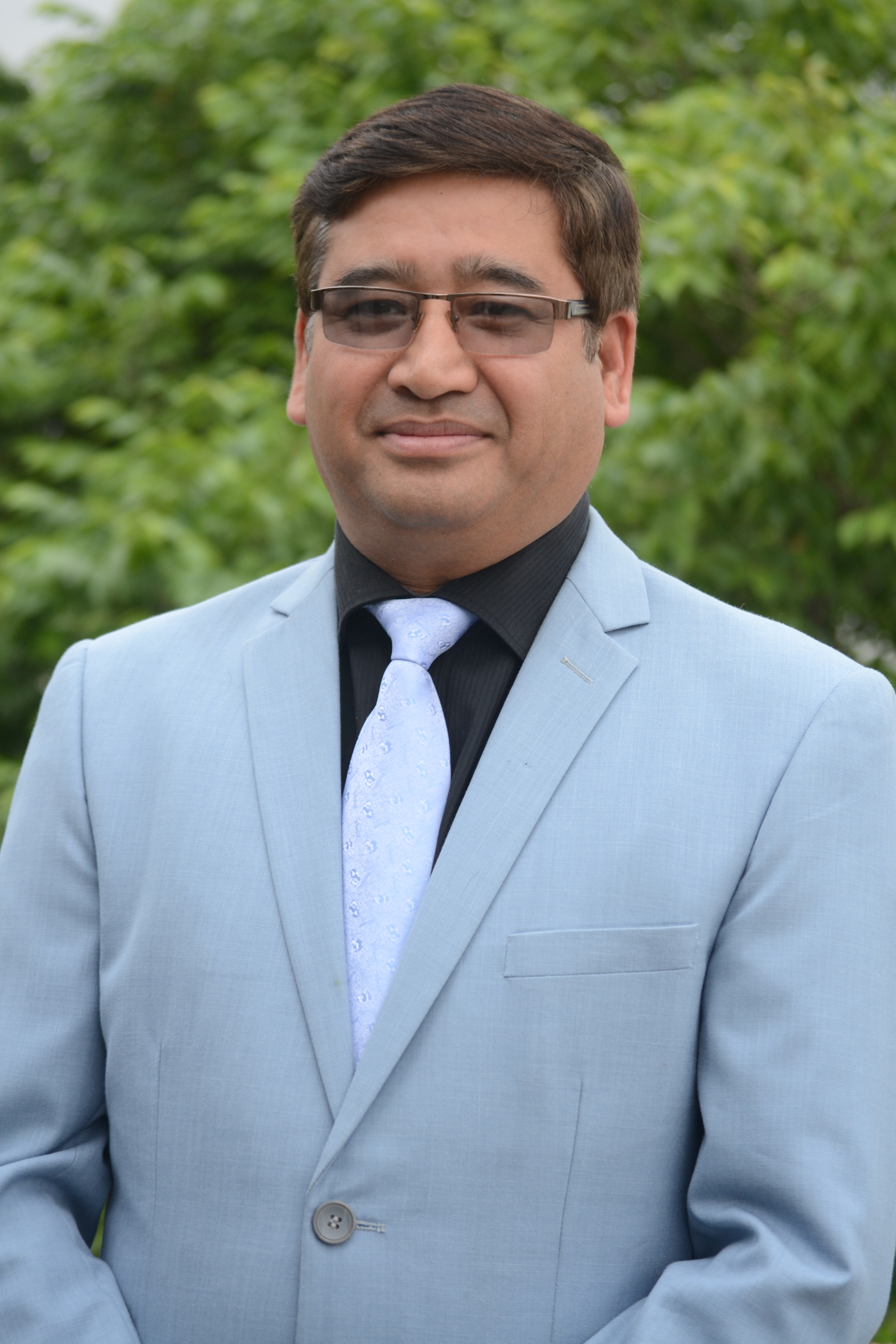

Minister of Culture, Tourism and Civil Aviation
- In office 27 June 2022 – 26 December 2022
- President: Bidhya Devi Bhandari
- Prime Minister: Sher Bahadur Deuba
- Preceded by: Prem Ale
- Succeeded by: Sudan Kirati

Member of Parliament, Pratinidhi Sabha
- In office 4 March 2018 – 18 September 2022
- Preceded by: Nabindra Raj Joshi
- Succeeded by: Biraj Bhakta Shrestha
- Constituency: Kathmandu 8

Chair of Nepal Olympic Committee
- Incumbent
- Assumed office 1 October 2015

Personal details
- Born: 30 December 1965 (age 60) Kathmandu-15, Nepal
- Party: CPN (United)
- Other political affiliations: CPN (Unified Socialist); CPN (UML)
- Education: Tribhuvan University

Jeevan Ram Shrestha (Nepali: जीवन राम श्रेष्ठ; born December 30, 1965) is a Nepali politician, who served as the Minister of Culture, Tourism and Civil Aviation in the ruling coalition government led by Prime Minister and Nepali Congress President Sher Bahadur Deuba.

He is a member of the newly formed CPN (United). His political engagement started from his college life as a student leader at Saraswoti Campus in Lainchaur. Jeevan Ram Shrestha was the elected president of Nepal Olympic Committee (NOC). He was an Ex-Secretary General of Nepal Olympic Committee. He has attended many events and actively made many plans on behalf of Nepal Olympic Committee. He is also the president of Nepal Ski Association. Shrestha grew up in a middle-class family in Kathmandu.

== See also ==
- CPN (United)
