= Nabindra Raj Joshi =

Nepalese politician (1964–2021)

- नविन्द्रराज जोशी

Minister of Industry
- In office August 2016 – September 2017
- President: Bidhya Devi Bhandari
- Prime Minister: Sher Bahadur Deuba
- Preceded by: Som Prasad Pandey
- Succeeded by: Sunil Bahadur Thapa

Member of Parliament, Pratinidhi Sabha
- In office 2008–2017
- Succeeded by: Jeevan Ram Shrestha
- Constituency: Kathmandu 8

12th Deputy Mayor of Kathmandu
- In office 1992–1997
- Mayor: Prem Lal Singh
- Preceded by: Tirtha Ram Dangol
- Succeeded by: Bidur Mainali

Personal details
- Born: 8 January 1964
- Died: 26 March 2021 (aged 57) Kathmandu, Nepal
- Party: Nepali Congress
- Education: Tribhuvan University

Nabindra Raj Joshi (Nepali: नविन्द्रराज जोशी; 8 January 1964 – 26 March 2021) was a Nepali politician and minister for industry. Joshi joined politics as a student, becoming the general secretary of Nepal Students Union in 1986. After the re-establishment of democracy, he was elected deputy mayor of Kathmandu, serving from 1992 to 1997. After the 2006 revolution, he was twice elected to the constituent assembly, in 2008 and 2013. He was the minister of industry from 2016 to 2017 in the coalition government of the Communist Party of Nepal (Maoist Centre) and Nepali Congress under the leadership of Pushpa Kamal Dahal. In the 2017 general election, he lost to Jeevan Ram Shrestha of CPN UML whom he had defeated in the previous elections.

== Career ==
Joshi entered politics as a student, joining the fight against the Panchayat regime as a member of Nepal Students Union, the student wing of Nepali Congress. He was elected the general secretary of the union in 1986.

After the restoration of democracy following the 1990 revolution, Joshi was elected deputy mayor of Kathmandu in 1992. Aged 27, Joshi was the youngest ever to serve as an office bearer. He held the office until 1997.

Joshi was elected to both the 2008 and 2013 constituent assemblies from Kathmandu constituency no. 8. In the 2008 election, he received 11,005 votes. He defeated Jeevan Ram Shrestha of CPN UML to be elected to the second constituent assembly in 2013, receiving 13,774 votes to Shrestha's 6,106.

He became the minister of industry of the second Dahal cabinet in 2016. He held the office until September 2017. Revival of Nepal Drug Limited, the publicly-owned drug-maker, was among the achievements of his term.

Joshi was unsuccessful in his bid for election to federal parliament in the 2017 general election. As a candidate for the House of Representatives from Kathmandu-8 constituency, he received 12,953 votes, losing by 444 votes to Jeevan Ram Shrestha of CPN UML.

Joshi served as the spokesperson of his party, Nepali Congress, from 2008 to 2013. He was a central committee member of Nepali Congress when he died in 2021. He was the founder and president of Ganeshman Singh Adhyayan Pratisthan.

== Personal life ==
Joshi was a native of Kathmandu. He had a wife and a daughter.

=== Illness and death ===
Joshi had suffered a minor heart attack in 2017 from which he recovered following an angioplasty.

Joshi was rushed to Bir Hospital at 3:00 am on 26 February 2021, and later moved to Norvic Hospital. He underwent surgery that same day, having suffered brain haemorrhage in the right part of his brain due to stroke. Kept under ventilator support for a month, he died on 26 March.

Nepali Congress president Sher Bahadur Deuba remembered Joshi as "an excellent organiser" and "an honest and faithful leader". The party called an emergency meeting on 27 March. It decided to fly the party's flag at half-mast for three days, and to postpone all party activities except mourning programmes for the same duration. Joshi's body was laid in state at the party's head office in Sanepa where Deuba draped his body in the party's flag, and various politicians of major political parties paid their respects. He was cremated by his family at the Pashupati Aryaghat the same day.
