= Balen Shah =

Prime Minister of Nepal since 2026

- वालेन शाह

Prime Minister of Nepal
- Incumbent
- Assumed office 27 March 2026
- President: Ram Chandra Paudel
- Vice President: Ram Sahaya Yadav
- Preceded by: Sushila Karki (interim)
Additional portfolios
Incumbent
Assumed office 27 March 2026
Ministries and Departments	Office of the Prime Minister and Council of Ministers; Ministry of Defence

Leader of the House of Representatives
- Incumbent
- Assumed office 26 March 2026
- Deputy: Ganesh Parajuli
- Preceded by: Position established

Member of the House of Representatives
- Incumbent
- Assumed office 26 March 2026
- Preceded by: K. P. Sharma Oli
- Constituency: Jhapa 5

Mayor of Kathmandu
- In office 30 May 2022 – 18 January 2026
- Deputy: Sunita Dangol
- Preceded by: Bidya Sundar Shakya
- Succeeded by: Sunita Dangol (acting)

Personal details
- Born: Balendra Shah; 27 April 1990 (age 36) Naradevi, Kathmandu, Nepal
- Party: Rastriya Swatantra (since 2026)
- Spouse: Sabina Kafle (m. 2018)
- Children: 1
- Education: Kathmandu University (PhD); Visvesvaraya Technological University (M.Tech); Purbanchal University (BE)
- Website: Government website

Balendra Shah (Note: Nepali and Maithili: वालेन्द्र शाह, romanized: Bālendra Shāh, pronounced [/baːlendra ʃaːh/], BAA-len-dra-SHAH) (Note: Balendra Shah is widely known as Balen Shah, a shortened form of his birth name, which was originally his stage name during his involvement in the music industry before entering politics; it now serves as his public and political identity.) (born 27 April 1990) is a Nepali politician, structural engineer, and rapper who has served as the prime minister of Nepal since 2026. At age 36, he is the world's youngest serving state leader. He assumed office following his party's landslide victory in the 2026 general election. Shah is the member of parliament for Jhapa 5 and was the mayor of Kathmandu from 2022 to 2026, the first independent politician to hold that office.

Shah, a structural engineer and rapper, entered politics in 2022 as mayor of Kathmandu. He emerged as a prominent political figure during the 2025 Gen Z protests and in January 2026, he resigned as Mayor of Kathmandu and joined the Rastriya Swatantra Party (RSP) to contest the 2026 general election as the party's prime ministerial candidate. He defeated former prime minister K. P. Sharma Oli in Jhapa 5 ending the latter's long-term dominance in the constituency.

Under Shah's premiership, the RSP government has initiated a "100-Point Charter of Governance", restructured the administration, and prioritized service delivery and anti-corruption. Despite criticism regarding his refusal to address the public, Shah remains a popular figure with over three-fourths of participants in an OnlineKhabar survey rating his government's performance over the first 100 days positively.

== Early life and education ==
Shah was born on 27 April 1990 in the Naradevi area of Kathmandu to a Maithil family from Ekdara, Mahottari District. He is the youngest of three children born to Dhruva Devi Shah, a housewife from Dhanusha District, and Dr. Ram Narayan Shah, an ayurvedic physician who worked at the Naradevi Ayurvedic Hospital. Shah's family prioritized education and discipline, while his father encouraged his interest in creative activities like music.

Shah attended Jaljala Secondary School and Alliance Academy, where he completed his primary and secondary education, respectively. He later attended V.S. Niketan Higher Secondary School and completed his intermediate science studies. It was during this time that he developed an interest in hip hop and began writing his own songs in Nepali and English. Shah went on to study civil engineering at Himalayan WhiteHouse International College, pursuing a Bachelor of Engineering (BE) degree. He later moved to Bengaluru, India, where he attended Nitte Meenakshi Institute of Technology (NITTE), affiliated with Visvesvaraya Technological University. He received a Master of Technology (M.Tech) in structural engineering in 2018.

After returning to Nepal, Shah worked as a structural engineer and was involved in infrastructure projects in the Kathmandu Valley. He later became a PhD research fellow at Kathmandu University where his research was based on the conservation of traditional Newa architecture and sustainable tourism. His doctoral studies were suspended when he began pursuing politics full-time.

== Early career ==
=== Music ===
Shah entered Nepal's underground Nep-hop scene in the early 2010s. His first single, "Sadak Balak" (Street Kid), was recorded in 2012 from lyrics he had written while in school. The track addressed urban social issues in Kathmandu and gained attention within Nepal's underground hip-hop scene.

In 2013 he participated in Raw Barz, a YouTube battle-rap series featuring emerging Nepali artists. His participation increased his visibility within the Nepali hip-hop scene. Over the following years he released songs addressing political corruption, social inequality, and urban life.

Shah frequently incorporated political and social themes into his music and online commentary.

In 2024 he wrote, composed, and performed "Nepal Haseko…" for the film Laaj Sharanam.

== Mayor of Kathmandu (2022–2026) ==
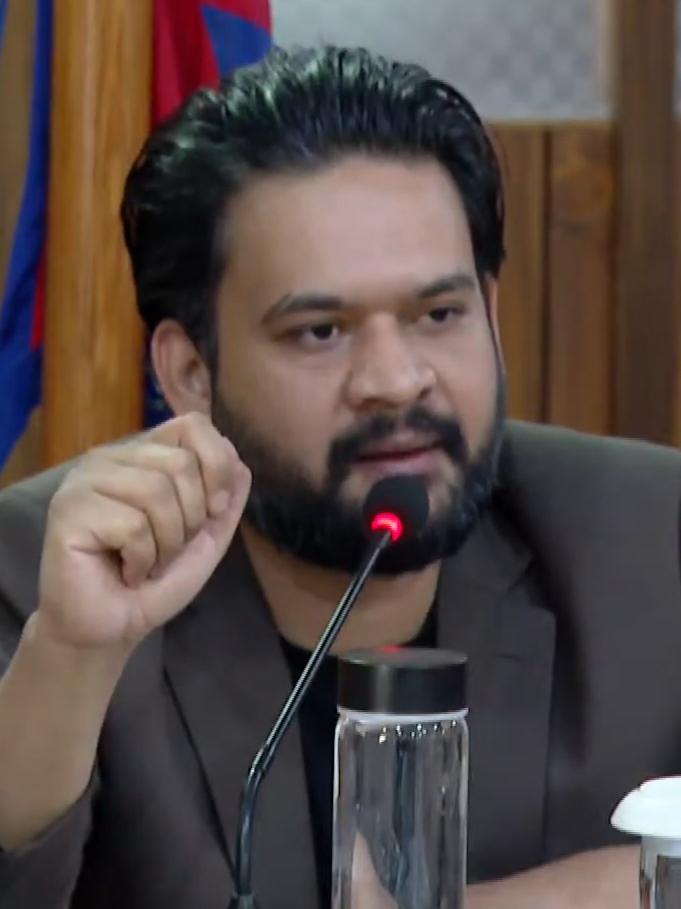
Shah in 2024

Shah had been discussing the idea of entering local politics since 2020. On 17 December 2021, he used his Facebook page to announce that he would contest the upcoming mayoral election as an independent. The move was treated by many as a curiosity—an entertainer dabbling in politics—but his campaign quickly gathered momentum. His core message revolved around waste management, traffic reform, transparent public services, anti-corruption measures, and the protection of Kathmandu's built heritage.

His styling was deliberately distinct from career politicians. He wore dark sunglasses, carried a wooden walking stick (lauro), and moved through the capital's narrow alleys on foot, stopping to talk to shopkeepers and street vendors. Young volunteers, many of them first-time voters, ran much of his ground campaign, and his rallies blended street theatre with hip-hop performances.

On 26 May 2022, he won the election with 61,767 votes (38.6%), defeating Nepali Congress candidate Sirjana Shrestha and former mayor Keshav Sthapit by a margin of more than 23,000 votes. He was sworn in on 30 May 2022 and immediately began a series of measures that defined his tenure.

His rise drew comparisons with the late Ujwal Thapa, the founder of Bibeksheel Nepali, who had spent years trying to break the hold of traditional parties. Several veterans of the Bibeksheel movement joined Shah's mayoral campaign, and his election was widely framed as a delayed harvest of seeds Thapa had planted before his death from COVID-19 in June 2021.

=== Infrastructure and public services ===
Within days of taking office Shah reached an agreement with the Ministry of Urban Development to restart garbage collection, which had been stalled for weeks. By August 2022 private companies were contracted to handle solid waste disposal following a four-point pact with local residents' committees.

His administration installed tactile paving along major footpaths to assist visually impaired pedestrians, and constructed falcha-style bus shelters modelled on traditional Newari rest houses. New bus routes were introduced, stops were upgraded, and a smart ticketing system was piloted on several corridors.

=== Transparency ===
Shah made the proceedings of Kathmandu's municipal council publicly accessible for the first time by introducing live telecasts of meetings. An online building permit system was rolled out and digital signatures were introduced to cut paperwork and reduce opportunities for bribe-taking.

=== Education and healthcare ===
Shah launched the "Textbook-Free Friday" programme in community schools, setting aside one day a week for technical skills and extracurricular activities. He also instructed private schools to offer scholarships to at least 10% of their students, enforcing a long-ignored legal provision. In healthcare, Rs 90 million was allocated to equip modern operating theatres at Kanti Children's Hospital, upgrade outpatient facilities at Tribhuvan University Teaching Hospital, and improve coronary care at Manmohan Transplant Centre.

=== Cultural heritage ===
His office expanded support for the Living Kumari, Bhairav, and Ganesh festivals. Cooperation agreements were signed with Tribhuvan University to modernise municipal services and conserve the city's traditional stone water spouts known as hiti.

=== Demolitions and evictions ===
Shortly after taking office, Shah launched a demolition campaign against structures he said had encroached on public land. Bulldozers were sent to commercial buildings including the Alfa Beta Complex in Baneshwor, the RB Complex in Khichapokhari, and the Suraj Arcade on New Road. Businesses were given 35 days' notice before enforcement began. The initial wave of demolitions was supported by some residents who had long resented the encroachments, but the campaign later drew criticism for its implementation and the absence of follow-up rebuilding.

The drive also targeted the buried Tukucha (Ikshumati) River. Part of the Jai Nepal Cinema Hall was torn down to uncover a section of the waterway, but a stay order from the Patan High Court halted further work. The court later ruled that while the river deserved protection, private property rights had to be respected as well. By early 2026 the exposed section remained visible but no additional conservation had been carried out.

In November 2022, attempts to evict squatters from the Bagmati riverbanks turned violent when municipal police clashed with residents, leaving 21 people injured. Squatters and activists demanded alternative accommodation before any relocation.

Shah's crackdown on street vendors also attracted international criticism. Human Rights Watch accused the city of using disproportionate force, citing videos that showed municipal police chasing and beating vendors. Small protests erupted, led by activists who argued that nearly half of Nepal's economy relied on informal businesses and that the city offered no safety net for those displaced. In September 2023 the activist known as Iih staged a 199‑hour vigil outside city hall; the protest ended with a commitment from the city to explore temporary permits and return confiscated goods.

=== Comment inciting violence against Singha Durbar ===
In September 2023, Shah posted on Facebook that he would "set Singha Durbar on fire" if municipal vehicles were stopped again, after his wife Sabina Kafle was halted at a police checkpoint while travelling in a car with government plates. The post drew criticism from political commentators and members of the public. An aide initially claimed Kafle had been rushing to hospital in labour, but it later emerged that she had already given birth a week earlier. The incident resurfaced in September 2025 when Gen Z protesters did set fire to Singha Durbar; Shah denied any connection to his earlier statement and urged the public to avoid rumours.

=== Map of Greater Nepal and ban on Indian films ===
In June 2023, Shah placed a map of "Greater Nepal" in his office—a map showing territories controlled by Nepal before the 1816 Treaty of Sugauli that are now part of India. The gesture was widely interpreted as a response to the display of an "Akhand Bharat" map in India's new Parliament.

The same month, he banned the screening of all Indian films in Kathmandu after the Bollywood release Adipurush included dialogue stating that "Sita is a daughter of India"—a line that generated controversy in Nepal, who regard Sita as having been born in Janakpur. The Patan High Court ordered the ban lifted; Shah refused to comply and publicly labelled the judiciary and central government "Indian slaves", though he later complied with the court order.

=== Offensive posts and the 2025 Gen Z protests ===
In November 2025 a late‑night Facebook post by Shah used an profanity directed at India, China, the United States, and all major Nepali political parties. Though the post was deleted within minutes, screenshots circulated widely and drew criticism from political commentators and social media users.

During the 2025 Nepalese Gen Z protests in September 2025, the student wing of the Nepali Congress filed a police complaint accusing Shah of inciting violence and withholding fire engines from burning government buildings. He rejected the allegations, insisting that city crews worked "around the clock" to protect public infrastructure.

== Prime Minister of Nepal ==
=== 2026 general election ===
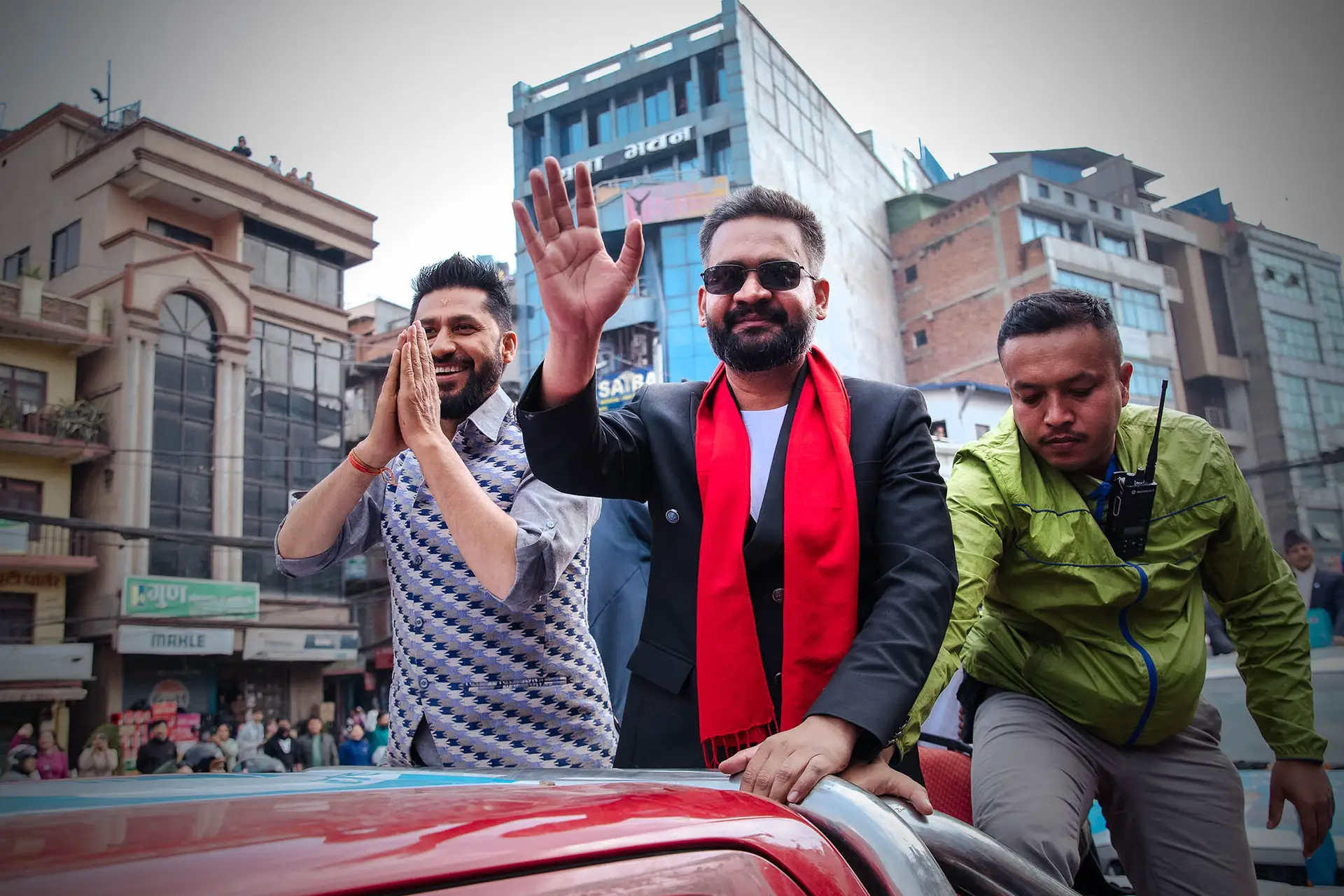
Balen Shah and Rabi Lamichhane during Kathmandu Valley election rally held by RSP for 2026 General Election.

On 28 December 2025, Shah formally joined the Rastriya Swatantra Party (RSP), stepping down as Mayor of Kathmandu on 18 January 2026 to contest the 2026 general election. He was immediately projected as the party's prime‑ministerial candidate. His arrival significantly increased public attention toward the RSP, which had been struggling under the weight of founder Rabi Lamichhane's legal troubles. Political observers noted that the presence of widely trusted figures such as Shah and Kul Man Ghising had given the party a renewed political momentum.

Shah chose to contest Jhapa 5, the stronghold of four‑time former prime minister K. P. Sharma Oli, who had held the seat almost continuously since 2008. The decision was seen as politically significant, a deliberate attempt to prove that the old guard could be beaten on its own turf. His rallies drew large crowds of young supporters, many of whom had never participated in a formal campaign before. When votes were counted on 5 March 2026, the RSP led in more than 90 constituencies, and in Jhapa‑5 Shah defeated Oli by a margin of 49,614 votes—68,348 to 18,734—one of the largest reported victory margins in a Nepali parliamentary election. On 7 March he received his victory certificate and formally became a member of the House of Representatives.

=== Appointment ===
As the parliamentary leader of the largest party, Shah was appointed Prime Minister by President Ram Chandra Paudel on 27 March 2026, and later announced members of his cabinet. At 35 years old he became the youngest prime minister in the history of the Federal Democratic Republic of Nepal.

=== Foreign visits ===
==== United Nations General Assembly ====
Shah with UN Secretary-General António Guterres in 2026

In September 2026, Shah led the Nepali delegation to the 81st session of the United Nations General Assembly in New York, marking his first international visit as Prime Minister. He left Kathmandu on 22 September, leading the delegation that included Foreign Minister Shisir Khanal, Chief Advisor Kumar Byanjankar, and Foreign Secretary Amrit Bahadur Rai. Shah addressed the General Debate on 24 September, focusing on climate justice and the impact of the recent 2026 Nepal–Tibet floods and other climate-related disasters in Nepal.

In his speech, he described climate disasters as a "development emergency" and called for stronger international climate financing and support for countries that are disproportionately affected by climate change despite contributing very little to global emissions. During his visit, he also held a bilateral meeting with United Nations Secretary-General António Guterres on 25 September before returning to Kathmandu on 26 September.

==== Visit to India ====
On 22 November 2026, Shah departed Kathmandu for a two-day state visit to India at the invitation of Indian Prime Minister Narendra Modi, marking his second international visit after attending United Nations General Assembly in the United States. He led a 35-member delegation that included Finance Minister Swarnim Wagle, Foreign Minister Shishir Khanal, and Chief Advisor Kumar Byanjankar. He travelled to New Delhi on a commercial Nepal Airlines flight, without a ceremonial military guard of honour at his departure. Upon arrival, he was received by Indian Union Minister Jitin Prasada and welcomed by soldiers of the Gorkha Regiments and performers presenting a traditional dance.

His schedule included a meeting with Indian External Affairs Minister S. Jaishankar and participation in the Nepal–India Business Forum. On 23 November, he is scheduled to hold high-level talks with Prime Minister Modi on energy cooperation, trade, digital and physical connectivity, air routes, and economic partnerships. The visit also includes the exchange of memorandums of understanding and a courtesy call on Indian President Droupadi Murmu.

== Tenure as Prime Minister (2026–present) ==
=== 100-point reform agenda ===
On 27 March, Shah's first day as prime minister, the government launched a 100-point reform agenda under a Delivery-Based Governance model to modernize Nepal's state institutions. The plan requires every ministry to operate under measurable targets, deadlines, and public performance monitoring. Major measures include reducing federal ministries from 22 to 17, banning party-affiliated unions in the civil service and education sector, establishing an Asset Investigation Commission to audit the wealth of senior public officials from 2048 BS onward, strengthening anti-money-laundering controls, creating a paperless, integrated government system with home delivery of passports, licenses, and national ID cards. The agenda also removes partisan student wings from schools, abolishes internal exams up to Grade 5, enforces a requirement that hospitals provide 10% of beds free of charge to disadvantaged patients, among many other reforms.

=== Fortnightly salary system ===
On 20 April 2026, the government announced that all civil servants, police, and military personnel would be paid every 15 days instead of monthly. Finance Minister Dr Swarnim Wagle said the change was intended to improve cash flow and economic liquidity, and that bi‑weekly payment cycles were common in developed countries. Nepal became the first South Asian country to adopt such a pay cycle for government staff.

=== Enforcement of tariff on Indian goods ===
From 19 April 2026, Nepal began stricter enforcement of tariff rules on goods worth over NPR 100 brought in from India. The move was aimed at curbing small-scale cross‑border shopping that bypassed formal tax channels and at boosting domestic trade. Border markets on the Indian side reported a steep drop in customers, while Nepali traders generally welcomed the policy. Residents in border areas, however, complained about the sudden rise in the cost of daily essentials.

=== Squatter settlement ===
On 23 April 2026, Balen Shah's government decided to begin the first phase of squatter settlement clearance in Thapathali, Manohara, Sinamangal and Gairigaun in Kathmandu with the help of local government and security force. The move was aimed at re-settling the illegal settlements residing alongside the riverbanks of Kathmandu to new houses and shelters in various places in the valley. This decision was highly criticised and objected to by human rights organizations, activists, and opposition parties citing that there are not enough places built yet that can hold all the people and that the government is making decisions irrationally without any proper plans.

=== Re-structuring of Ministries ===
On 13 May 2026, the government decided to reduce the number of federal ministries from 22 to 18, with the main objective of maintaining administrative reform and frugality, reducing unnecessary current expenditure, and making the work performance more effective and swift. The decision to merge some of the ministries faced criticism from former bureaucrats and senior officials about rationale behind the mergers, renaming and redistribution of portfolios.

== Personal life ==
Shah married Sabina Kafle, a public health professional, in 2018. The couple have one daughter and live in the Gairigaun neighbourhood of Tinkune, Kathmandu.

== Electoral history ==
=== 2022 Kathmandu mayoral election ===
Mayoral elections result
Party	Candidate	Votes	%	±%
Independent	Balendra Shah	61,767	38.6%	New
Congress	Sirjana Singh	38,341	24.0%	+1.1%
CPN (UML)	Keshav Sthapit	38,117	23.8%	−9.1%
Independent	Suman Sayami	13,770	8.6%	New
RPP	Madan Das Shrestha	5,770	3.6%	New
Others		2,141	1.3%	
Total valid votes		159,906		
Rejected ballots		31,280		
Turnout		191,186	63.68%	−9.04%
Registered electors		300,242		+10.7%

=== 2026 Jhapa-5 parliamentary election ===
Parliamentary elections result
Party	Candidate	Votes	%	±%
RSP	Balendra Shah	68,348	66.79%	+54.27%
CPN (UML)	KP Sharma Oli	18,734	18.31%	−37.3%
Shram Sanskriti	Samir Tamang	9,233	9.02%	New
Congress	Mandhara Chimariya	1,821	1.78%	−23.51%
Others		4,202	4.10%	−2.36%
Total valid votes		102,338		
Rejected ballots		4,230		
Turnout		106,568	63.68%	
Registered electors		163,379		

== Recognitions ==
Time magazine included Shah in its "The 100 Most Influential People of 2023", citing his independent victory as a challenge to Nepal's established party system. He was again listed in the Time 100 for 2026, recognition of his political rise and his influence on political change following the 2025 Gen‑Z protests.

Notable records and distinctions attributed to Shah include:

- Youngest serving state leader in the world from 27 March 2026 to present.
- Youngest serving Prime Minister of the Federal Democratic Republic of Nepal.
- First Independent Mayor of Kathmandu (2022).
- Mayor of the Year (2025): Recognized by the International Democracy Community for his governance of Kathmandu.
- Kathmandu University (KU) Research Fellowship (2023): Awarded a PhD research fellowship by KU's Civil Engineering Department for Shah's posal on the conservation of the traditional Newar architecture and sustainable tourism.

== See also ==
- 2025 Nepalese Gen Z protests
- Karki interim cabinet
- 2026 Nepalese general election
- Balen Shah cabinet
- Premiership of Balen Shah

== Citations ==
==== References ====
House of Representatives of Nepal
Preceded by K. P. Sharma Oli	Member of Parliament for Jhapa 5; 2026–present	Incumbent
Political offices
Preceded by Sushila Karki; Interim	Prime Minister of Nepal; 2026–present	Incumbent
Preceded by Bidya Sundar Shakya	Mayor of Kathmandu; 2022–2026	Succeeded by Sunita Dangol; Acting
