= Mayor of Kathmandu =

Executive head of Kathmandu Metropolitan City

Mayor of Kathmandu Metropolitan City
- काठमाडौँ महानगरपालिकाका नगर प्रमुख
- Flag of Kathmandu
- Incumbent; Sunita Dangol; Acting since 18 January 2026
- Style: No courtesy or style ascribed
- Type: Executive Head
- Seat: Office of Municipal Executive, Kathmandu
- Appointer: Electorate of Kathmandu
- Term length: Five years, renewable once
- Constituting instrument: Constitution of Nepal
- Inaugural holder: Singha Shumsher Jung Bahadur Rana
- Formation: 1932; 94 years ago
- Salary: रु 46,000
- Website: kathmandu.gov.np

The Mayor of Kathmandu is the head of the municipal executive of Kathmandu Metropolitan City. The officeholder is elected for a five-year term and limited to serving no more than two terms. The role was first created in 1932 during the Rana regime.

The current acting mayor is Sunita Dangol since 18 January 2026, who was elected as deputy mayor in the 2022 election and took office on 30 May 2022. The position has been held by fifteen people in a permanent capacity since its creation.

The city of Kathmandu is scrutinized by the Kathmandu Metropolitan City Municipal Assembly and the mayor is supported by the Municipal Executive which consists of ward chairs of all 32 wards of Kathmandu.

== History ==
Kathmandu was first declared as a municipality in 1932 after the formulation of the Kathmandu Municipality Sabal act. It was founded as a waste management department and Singha Shumsher Jung Bahadur Rana was appointed as the first 'Mayor Man' of Kathmandu municipality in the same year by the government of Chandra Shumsher.

In 1947, the first municipal elections were held in Kathmandu. Gehendra Shumsher Thapa was appointed as the chairman of Kathmandu by the Rana regime and Shankar Dev Pant was elected as his deputy from the common people.

In the first democratic elections since the fall of the Rana regime in 1953, Janak Man Shrestha was elected as mayor of Kathmandu by the council in an indirect election and became the city's first elected mayor. After King Mahendra's coup d'teat in 1960, the position of mayor was abolished and the Pradhan Panch (Council Head) would be the elected head of Kathmandu municipality.

Kathmandu municipality was declared as a metropolitan city by mayor Prem Lal Singh in 1995 and Keshav Sthapit was elected as the first mayor of the metropolitan city in 1997.

== Power and functions ==
Local government in Nepal has authority over the local units pursuant to Schedule 8 of the Constitution of Nepal. The mayor derives its power from the Local Government Operation Act, 2017.

The main functions of the mayor are:

- Summon and chair meetings of the municipal assembly and the municipal executive.
- Table agendas and proposals to the municipal assembly and the municipal executive.
- Prepare and present the annual programme and budget.
- Enforce the decisions of the assembly and the executive.
- Oversee the work of committees and sub-committees of the municipality and ward committees.

The mayor of Kathmandu is also a member of the Kathmandu District Assembly, and an ex-officio member of the Pashupati Area Development Trust, the Boudhanath Area Development Committee, the senate of the National Academy of Medical Sciences and the chairman of the Valley Municipal Forum.

== List of mayors ==
=== Rana regime (1932–51) ===
#	Mayor	Term of office	
1	Singha Shumsher Jung Bahadur Rana	1932	Unknown
2	Gehendra Shumsher Thapa	1947	1953

=== Transition period (1953–60) ===
#	Mayor	Term of office		Political party
3	Janak Man Shrestha	1953	1954	Communist Party of Nepal
4	Prayagraj Singh Suwal	1957	1960	Nepali Congress

=== Panchayat era (1966–90) ===
#	Pradhan Pancha	Term of office	
5	Ganesh Man Shrestha	1966	1971
6	Rajendra Man Suwal	1971	1976
7	Basudev Dhungana	1976	1981
8	Prem Bahadur Shakya	1981	1983
9	Kamal Chitrakar	1983	1987
10	Haribol Bhattarai	1988	1992

=== Constitutional monarchy era (1990–2008) ===
#	Portrait	Mayor	Term of office		Political party
11		Prem Lal Singh	1992	1997	Nepali Congress
12		Keshav Sthapit	1997	2006	CPN (UML)
13		Rajaram Shrestha	2006	2007	Rastriya Prajatantra Party

=== Federal Democratic Republic of Nepal (2017–present) ===
#	Portrait	Name	Term of office		Elected	Political party
14		Bidya Sundar Shakya	31 May 2017	19 May 2022	2017	CPN (UML)
15		Balendra Shah	30 May 2022	18 January 2026	2022	Independent
—		Sunita Dangol	18 January 2026	Incumbent; Acting Mayor	—	CPN (UML)

== See also ==
- History of Kathmandu
