= Biraj Bhakta Shrestha =

Minister of Energy, Water Resources and Irrigation of Nepal since 2026

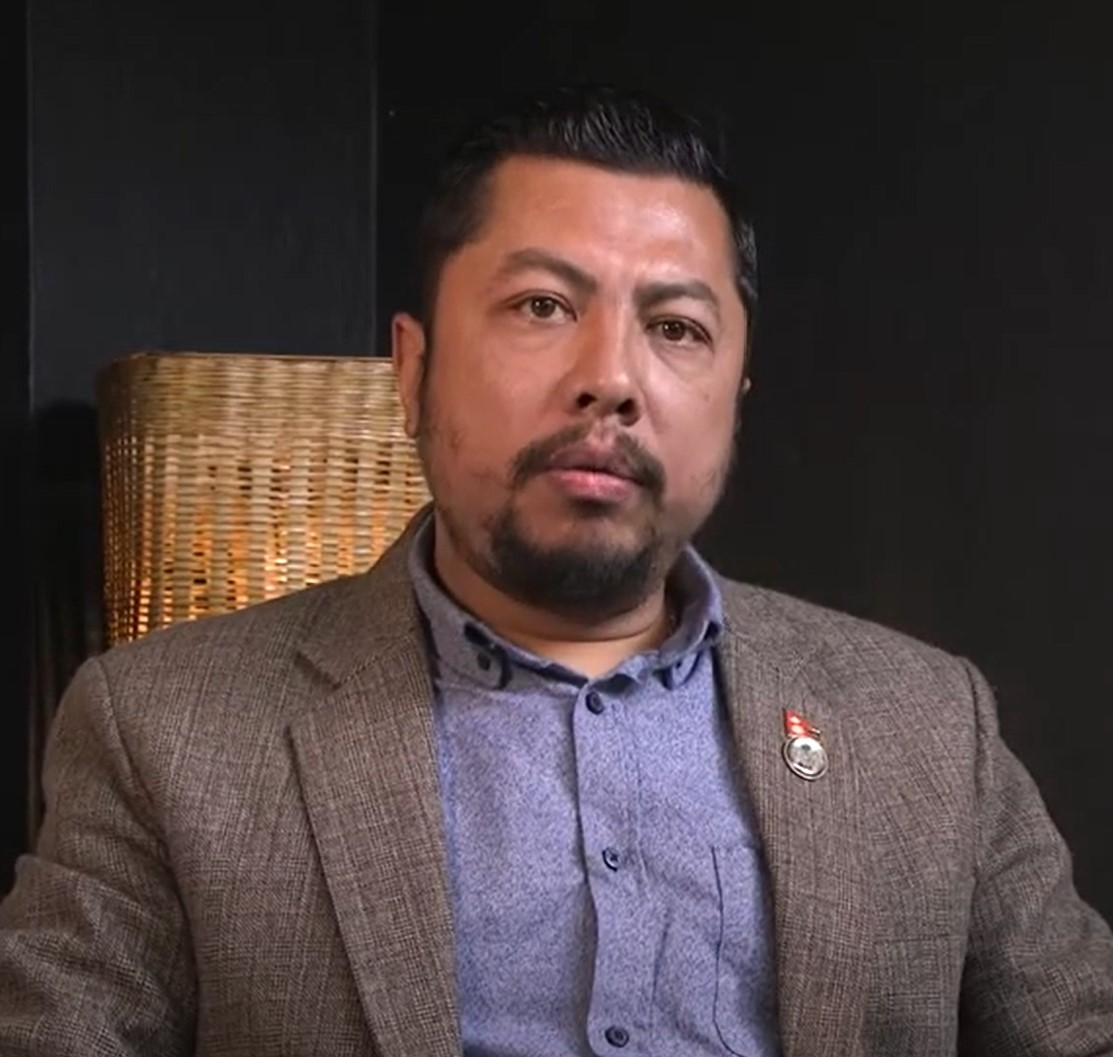
- Biraj Bhakta Shrestha in 2020

Minister of Energy, Water Resources and Irrigation
- Incumbent
- Assumed office 27 March 2026
- President: Ram Chandra Poudel
- Prime Minister: Balendra Shah
- Preceded by: Anil Kumar Sinha

Minister of Youth and Sports
- In office 6 March 2024 – 15 July 2024
- President: Ram Chandra Poudel
- Prime Minister: Pushpa Kamal Dahal
- Preceded by: Dig Bahadur Limbu
- Succeeded by: Teju Lal Chaudhary

Member of Parliament, Pratinidhi Sabha
- Incumbent
- Assumed office 26 March 2026
- Preceded by: Himself
- Constituency: Kathmandu 8
- In office 22 December 2022 – 12 September 2025
- Preceded by: Jeevan Ram Shrestha
- Succeeded by: Himself
- Constituency: Kathmandu 8

Personal details
- Born: 8 May 1981 (age 45) Kathmandu, Nepal
- Party: Rastriya Swatantra (since 2022)
- Other political affiliations: Bibeksheel Sajha (before 2022)
- Spouse: Shristi Singh Bhandari
- Relatives: Sharat Singh Bhandari (father-in-law)
- Website: birajbhakta.com

Biraj Bhakta Shrestha (Note: Nepali: विराजभक्त श्रेष्ठ) (born 8 May 1981) is a Nepalese politician and the current Minister for Energy, Water Resources and Irrigation. He is a member of Rastriya Swatantra Party. He was elected to the House of Representatives from Kathmandu 8 in the 2022 general elections. He secured victory over the runner-up candidate by a margin of approximately five thousand votes.

In the 2026 Nepalese general election, which took place after the Gen Z revolutions, He won decisively in Kathmandu-8 with 24,592 votes. His nearest rival, Suman Sayami of the Nepali Communist Party, received only 3,217 votes, failing to cross the vote threshold, and all other candidates forfeited their election deposits.

He previously served as a member of the inaugural Bagmati Provincial Assembly from the Bibeksheel Sajha party list.

== Electoral History ==
=== 2026 Kathmandu-8 Parliamentary Election Result ===
Party	Candidate	Votes	Percent (%)
RSP	Biraj Bhakta Shrestha	24592	67.52
Nepali Communist Party	Suman Sayami	3217	8.83
Nepali Congress	Sapana Rajbhandari	2835	7.78
CPN (UML)	Rajesh Shakya	1909	5.24
RPP	Nabin Shahi	1909	5.24
Others		1958	5.38

== See also ==
- Bibeksheel Sajha Party
