= Shisir Khanal =

Nepalese Minister of Foreign Affairs since 2026

- शिशिर खनाल
- Khanal in 2026 at Asia Society

Minister of Foreign Affairs
- Incumbent
- Assumed office 27 March 2026
- President: Ram Chandra Paudel
- Prime Minister: Balen Shah
- Preceded by: Bala Nanda Sharma

Minister of Education, Science and Technology
- In office 17 January 2023 – 5 February 2023
- Prime Minister: Pushpa Kamal Dahal
- Preceded by: Devendra Paudel
- Succeeded by: Ashok Rai

Member of Parliament, Pratinidhi Sabha
- Incumbent
- Assumed office 22 December 2022
- Preceded by: Bhimsen Das Pradhan
- Constituency: Kathmandu 6

Personal details
- Born: 30 December 1978 (age 47) Kathmandu, Nepal
- Party: Rastriya Swatantra Party
- Spouse: Achyuta Adhikari
- Education: MIPA (UW-Madison); BA in IPE and Diplomacy (University of Bridgeport)
- Alma mater: University of Wisconsin–Madison; University of Bridgeport
- Website: shisirkhanal.com

Shisir Khanal (Note: Nepali: शिशिर खनाल, romanized: Śhiśir Khanāl, Nepali pronunciation: [sisiɾ kʰʌnal]) is a Nepalese politician who has served as the Minister of Foreign Affairs since 2026. A senior member of the Rastriya Swatantra Party (RSP), Khanal is a two-term member of parliament from Kathmandu 6, having been first elected in 2022 and re-elected in the 2026 general election amid the RSP's landslide victory.

He briefly served as Minister of Education, Science and Technology in 2023 before the RSP withdrew from the coalition government.

Khanal is a co-founder of Teach For Nepal and has been active in RSP's leadership, including as head of its foreign affairs and tourism departments, a central secretariat member, and a key negotiator in post-election alliances. He had been mentioned as a potential candidate for Foreign Minister in the new RSP-led government.

== Early life and education ==
Khanal was born on 30 December 1978 in Kathmandu, Nepal. He earned a Bachelor of Arts (BA) in International Political Economy and Diplomacy from the University of Bridgeport and a Master of International Public Affairs (MIPA) from the Robert M. La Follette School of Public Affairs at the University of Wisconsin–Madison in 2005.

== Early career ==
Before entering politics, Khanal co-founded Teach For Nepal in 2012 and led reconstruction efforts via the Sarvodaya Shramdan movement in Sri Lanka and Haiti.

== Political career ==
He entered politics with the Rastriya Swatantra Party and won the Kathmandu 6 seat in the 2022 general election. He served as the Education Minister from 17 January to 5 February 2023.

In the 2026 general election, following widespread Gen Z protests and political upheaval, Khanal was re-elected with a decisive margin of 27,719 votes, contributing to Rastriya Swatantra Party's overwhelming mandate. He has emphasized responsibility for good governance and prosperity, and Rastriya Swatantra Party's role in the new government was under discussion post-election.

As Minister of Foreign Affairs, he attended the eighty-first session of the United Nations General Assembly, where he addressed the G7 Development Ministers' meeting and urged for greater cooperation and collaboration to address climate change and natural disasters.
