= V.S. Niketan Higher Secondary School =

Secondary school in Tinkune, Nepal

Coordinates: 27°41′09″N 85°20′35″E

V.S. Niketan Secondary School
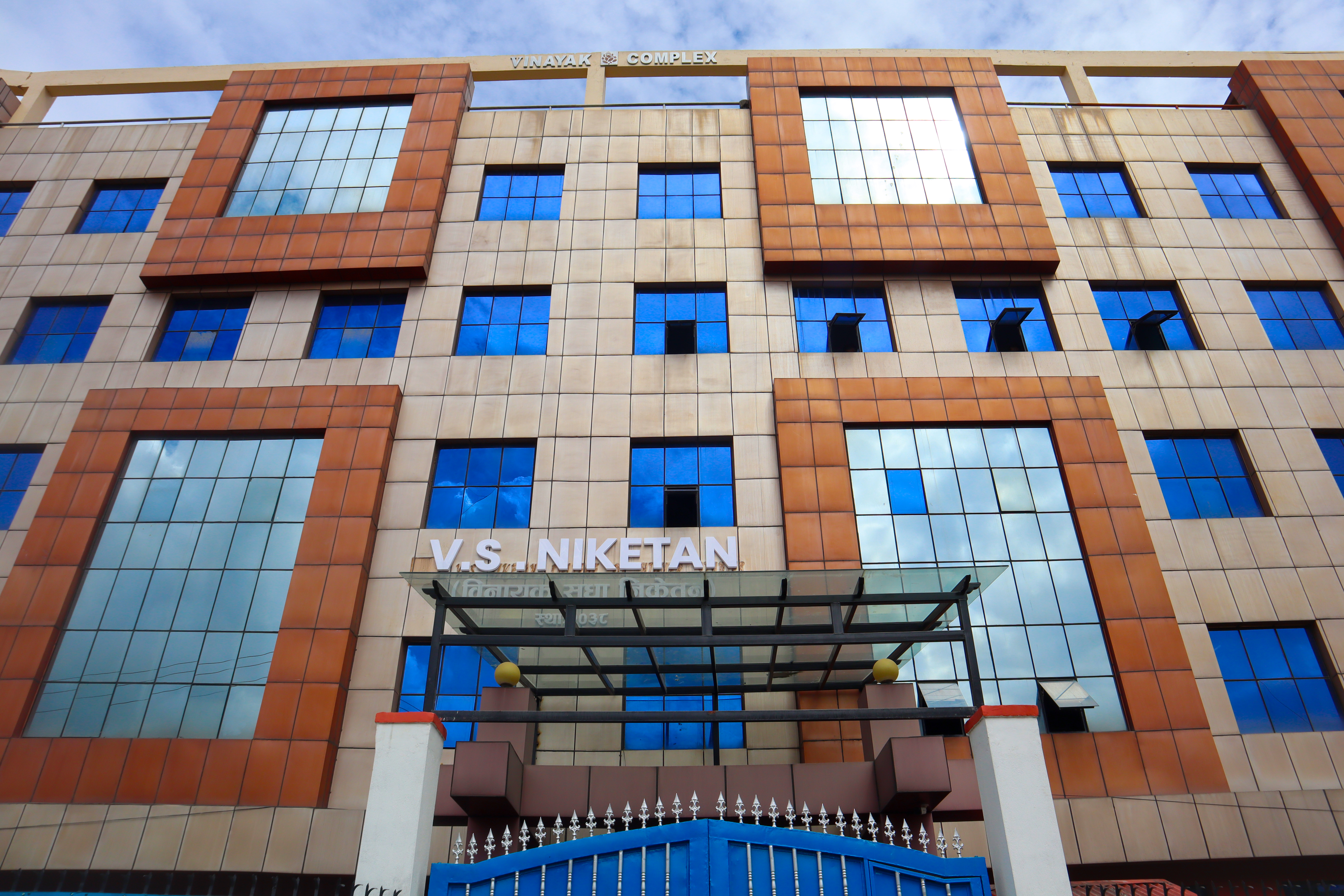
- Tinkune; Nepal

Information
- Other name: VSN
- Motto: "Dedicated to Excellence in Education"
- Established: 1981 AD
- Founder: Late Dr. Babu Ram Pokharel
- School district: Kathmandu
- Chairperson: Mrs. Urmila Pokharel
- Director: Dr. Baibhav Pokharel
- Enrollment: ~4000
- Houses: Red/Blue/Yellow/Green
- Website: vsniketan.edu.np

V.S. Niketan Secondary School is located in 32-Tinkune, Kathmandu, Nepal, and schools above 4000 current students. V.S. Education Foundation is the outcome of the expansion of an education system aiming to coordinate all the educational activities of the institution so that the entity established at V.S. Niketan is uniformly maintained in all levels of teaching and learning under the same roof. The institution function form Pre-Primary to Bachelor's Levels of education. It has been awarded the "Best School of Nepal" for two times, recently.

Established in the year 2039 B.S. (1981 AD) by Founder Principal Late Dr. Babu Ram Pokharel. It accommodates the Lower-Secondary level SEE and Higher-Secondary level HSEB qualifications to the students and guides its alumni to the College Education.

== Curriculum ==
The school delivers a curriculum designed to meet the needs of each student through the application of Nepal's National Curriculum. The Curriculum is taught through the Developmental Interactive Approach. English is the medium of instruction.

The primary curriculum includes the core areas of learning and experience, these are: English and Nepali Language and Literacy, Mathematics, Science, Social Studies, Health and Physical Education, Creative and Expressive Arts, Information and Communications Technology and Vocational Education. Students go out of school to extend their knowledge and experience through educational field trips. This provides direct first-hand experience in learning as well as providing a stimulus for work in the classroom.

In teaching English a high priority is placed on all aspects of literacy; speaking, listening, reading and writing, spelling and handwriting. Art, music and drama rooms develop a student's creativity and confidence. VSN places an emphasis on increasing student's performance skills. Each term during Curriculum Night parents is informed of their child's grade curriculum. At the end of each school year a Curriculum Committee reviews each grade level curriculum in relation to “Best Teaching Practices” used throughout the year and student academic performance. Changes to the curriculum are made accordingly.

The Primary School consists of classes 1 to 5. In addition to oral work, activities, games, practicals, excursions, etc., students are taught subjects like English, Nepali, Mathematics, Science, Social Studies, Computer Studies, Moral Science, General Knowledge and Health Education. They are taught gymnastics and swimming. Co-curricular activities such as singing, dance and instrumental music are taught.

The Lower Secondary School consists of classes 6 to 8. Besides English, Nepali, Mathematics, Science, Social Studies, Computer Studies, Moral Science, General Knowledge, the students are introduced to advanced level Mathematics and H.P.E. (Environment Health & Population) Co-curricular activities also include Club activities.

The Secondary School consists of classes 9 and 10. The HMG (S. L. C.) curricular is followed in these classes. The students, however, take part in co-curricular activities and club activities. They are also introduced to a course in Advanced Level English.

The Higher Secondary School consists of classes 11 and 12. The HSEB curricular is followed in between commerce and science subjects. The students of this level take part in various co-curricular activities.

== Services & Facilities ==
=== Classrooms ===
Each classroom has a capacity of

=== Hostel ===
The school has accommodation for its students in a hostel, close to the school building.

=== Cafeteria ===
Food is provided by the school cafe. Hot and cold drinks are available and snacks.

=== Transportation ===
Bus services are available from Kathmandu, Bhaktapur and Lalitpur

== Extracurricular Activities (ECA) ==
=== Sports ===
Sports activities include, basketball. table tennis and other indoor games. For sports like cricket and football

=== Educational Trips ===
Field trips are arranged to nearby places. An annual picnic is held to give opportunities for students’ socialization.

== Internal Evaluation ==
Monthly progress reports on homework, note presentation, and classroom performance are sent to parents.

VSN has three terminal examinations in a session before the board exam (including preboard).

== Physical Structure ==
V.S. Niketan complex is located at Tinkune, Kathmandu.

- The complex is divided into 9 different blocks:
1. Pre-Primary Block 'G'
2. Primary Block 'F'
3. Lower Secondary and Secondary Block 'H'
4. Higher Secondary (10+2) Science Block 'B'
5. Higher Secondary (10+2) Management and Humanities Block 'C'
6. Bachelor's Level (BBA) Block 'D'
7. Main Administrative Block 'A'
8. School Administrative and Activities Block 'E'
