= Bhimsen Das Pradhan =

Nepali politician

Honourable Bhimsen Das Pradhan
- भिमसेन दास प्रधान

Defence Minister of Nepal
- In office 26 July 2017 – 15 February 2018
- President: Bidya Devi Bhandari
- Prime Minister: Sher Bahadur Deuba
- Preceded by: Bal Krishna Khand
- Succeeded by: Ishwor Pokharel

Member of Parliament, Pratinidhi Sabha
- In office 4 March 2018 – 18 September 2022
- Preceded by: Himself (as Member of the Constituent Assembly)
- Succeeded by: Shishir Khanal
- Constituency: Kathmandu 6

Member of the Constituent Assembly
- In office 21 January 2014 – 14 October 2017
- Preceded by: Hitman Shakya
- Succeeded by: Himself (as Member of Parliament)
- Constituency: Kathmandu 6

Personal details
- Born: July 17, 1953 (age 72)
- Party: Nepali Congress

Bhimsen Das Pradhan (Nepali: भिमसेन दास प्रधान) was a member of 2nd Nepalese Constituent Assembly. He won Kathmandu–6 seat in 2013 Nepalese Constituent Assembly election from Nepali Congress. On 26 July 2017, he was appointed Defence Minister of Nepal by Prime Minister Deuba.
