= Bidya Sundar Shakya =

Nepali politician

Bidhya Sundar Shakya
- बिद्या सुन्दर शाक्य
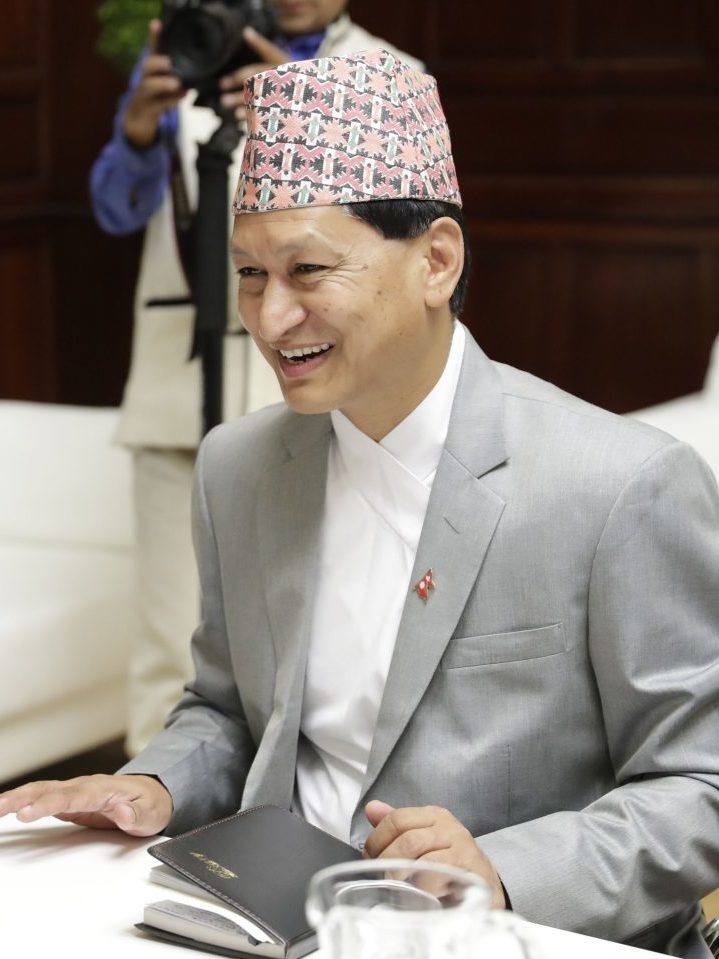

14th Mayor of Kathmandu
- In office 31 May 2017 – 19 May 2022
- Deputy: Hari Prabha khadki
- Preceded by: Rajaram Shrestha
- Succeeded by: Balendra Shah

Personal details
- Born: 23 May 1963 (age 63) Lagan, Kathmandu
- Party: Nepal Communist Party
- Spouse: Suchita Shakya
- Children: 2
- Education: Shankar Dev Campus

Bidya Sundar Shakya (Nepali: विद्या सुन्दर शाक्य) is a Nepalese politician, who served as 14th Mayor of Kathmandu Metropolitan City. Shakya previously also served as Chairman of Ward No. 21 for two terms. He is also the Central Committee Member of CPN UML.

== See also ==
- 2017 Kathmandu municipal election
- Kathmandu Metropolitan City

Political offices
Preceded by Rajaram Shrestha	Mayor of Kathmandu; 2017–2022	Succeeded by Balendra Shah
