= 1953 Kathmandu municipal election =

1953 Local election

Local elections to a municipal council for Kathmandu, the capital of Nepal, (Nepali: काठमाडौ नगरपालिका चुनाव सन् १९५३) were first held on September 9, 1953. Candidates nominated by the illegal Communist Party of Nepal got 50% of the total votes cast. Out of a total of 19 seats, six were won by communists, four by Nepali Congress, four by Praja Parishad, one by Gorkha Parishad and four by independents.

Amongst the elected communists was the chairman of the council, Janak Man Singh. However, his tenure became short. A jurisdictional dispute emerged between the municipal council and the national government. A no-confidence vote removed Singh from his office and the national government banned him from entering the municipal council office. Singh was arrested when attempting to enter the office, and was jailed.
