= Keshav Sthapit =

Nepalese politician

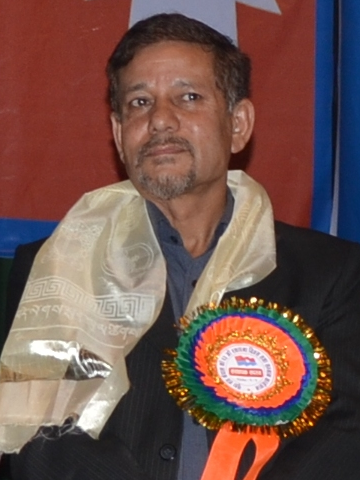

Minister for Physical Infrastructure Development of Bagmati Province
- In office 12 February 2018 – 2 November 2018
- Governor: Anuradha Koirala
- Chief Minister: Dormani Poudel
- Preceded by: Constitution created
- Succeeded by: Rameshwor Phuyal

Member of Provincial Assembly of Bagmati Province
- In office 2017–2022
- Constituency: Kathmandu 6

12th Mayor of Kathmandu
- In office 1997–2006
- Deputy: Bidur Mainali
- Preceded by: Prem Lal Singh
- Succeeded by: Rajaram Shrestha

Personal details
- Born: 1956 (age 69–70) Kathmandu, Nepal
- Party: CPN (UML)
- Occupation: Politician

Keshav Sthapit is a former mayor of Kathmandu metropolitan city. He also held the position of minister in Bagmati Pradesh and is a former member of the province's Assembly. Keshav Sthapit was elected as the mayor of Kathmandu in 1997. After the royal takeover in 2005, he was appointed the Mayor of Kathmandu by the Monarch. In year 2005 he was top finalist for world best mayor. After the return of democracy, he was appointed a Commissioner of Kathmandu Valley Development Authority after joining Unified Communist Party of Nepal (Maoist) but was removed from the post after only nine months. He was a candidate for Member of Parliament from Kathmandu 6 in 2017, but came in fifth place under the ticket of Federal Socialist Party. He returned to CPN-UML and became a Provincial Minister but was sacked by Chief Minister Dormani Poudel after misbehaving during cabinet meetings. There have been multiple allegations of sexual assault against Sthapit.

== Electoral history ==
=== 2013 Constituent Assembly election ===
Kathmandu 6
Party	Candidate	Votes
Nepali Congress	Bhimsen Das Pradhan	14,151
CPN (Unified Marxist–Leninist)	Yogesh Bhattarai	12,874
UCPN (Maoist)	Hem Lal Sharma	5,945
Rastriya Prajatantra Party Nepal	Sanjay Man Shrestha	2,385
Federal Socialist Party, Nepal	Keshav Sthapit	1,050
Others		2,821
Result	Congress gain	
Source: Election Commission

== See also ==
- Nepali Congress
