= Sarbottam Dangol =

Sarbottam Dangol सर्वोत्तम डंगोल
- Born: Sarbottam Dangol; 30 August 1955 (age 71); Kathmandu, Nepal
- Education: Tribhuvan University (Bachelor of Science, Master of Management)
- Occupations: Former Headmaster and Former Politician
- Years active: 1980 to 2019
- Political party: Former prominent politician at United People's Front of Nepal, retired from Communist Party of Nepal (Maoist-Centre), and formerly affiliated with Nepal Communist Party
- Spouse: Shanta Dangol (m. 1988)
- Parents: Dwarika Das Dangol (father); Jambuwati Dangol (mother)

Sarbottam Dangol (Nepali: सर्वोत्तम डंगोल) (Born on 30 August 1955 in Kathmandu, Nepal), politically known as 'Kailash' (Nepali: कैलाश), is a retired politician, former central committee member of Communist Party of Nepal (Maoist-Centre), and former prominent leader of United People's Front of Nepal (Samyukta Jan Morcha). He stood as a candidate for the mayor post of Kathmandu Metropolitan City in May 2017. He also stood for the election in 2008 Nepalese constituent Assembly from Kathmandu area no. 8.

He belongs to Newar community of Nepal.

== Personal life, education and early career ==
Sarbottam Dangol was born on 30 August 1955 to his father Dwarika Dangol (also a Nepalese communist leader, known as "Kisan neta", Nepali: "किसान नेता") and his mother Jambuwati Dangol, as an eighth child in Kathmandu, the capital city of Nepal in a middle-class family. He received a Bachelor of Science and Master of Management from Tribhuvan University, Kathmandu, Nepal. He also worked as a school headmaster till 1985 and worked as a communist political leader of United People's Front of Nepal.

== Political career ==
His active and most important participation in Nepalese politics was during the late 80s and early 90s, when he worked as a student leader, who threatened the then royal government and resulted in his arrest by the former royal government in May 1985 and detention for two years without charge or trial, including two months of incommunicado detention. Amnesty International strongly demanded his release to the then-royal government after the reports of torture had been revealed. His participation was notably important during the People's movement of anti-monarchy for Republic establishment in 1990, and he was imprisoned several times until the establishment of multi-party democracy in 1990. During the anti-panchayat movement, he was disappeared by the state for 84 days and jailed for over two years.

He joined the United People's Front of Nepal in 1991, Communist Party of Nepal (Maoist-Centre) in 2007, and subsequently Nepal Communist Party and currently retired from politics. He is a former political representative at Kathmandu Metropolitan City.
