= Gul (name) =

Gul ګل
- Pronunciation: /ɡʊl/
- Gender: Unisex
- Language: Swedish, Danish, Norwegian, Persian, Pashto, Kurdish, Yazidi, and Turkish

Origin
- Meaning: "Yellow" in Swedish, Danish and Norwegian. "Rose" in Turkish. "Flower" in Persian, Pashto and Kurdish.
- Region of origin: Europe and Central Asia

Gul is a common name in Persian (گل Gol) and Turkish (Gül) languages, meaning rose. Gul is used as a family name in Europe, Central and South Asia.

It is also a Nordic given name, used in Swedish, Danish, and Norwegian languages as a short form of Guðólfr (Godwulf).

The name is also an abbreviation used in the medieval and early modern periods for William (derived from French Guillaume), for example in the signature "Gul: Ebor" for William Dawes, Archbishop of York.

== Given name ==
=== Males ===
- Gul Bakhsh, Bengali poet
- Gul Hameed Bhatti, Pakistani journalist
- Gul Chaman, Afghan prisoner of the United States at Guantanamo Bay Naval Base
- Gul Haider, Afghan politician
- Gul Mohammed Jangvi, Afghan Taliban field commander
- Haji Alam Gul Kuchi, Afghan politician
- Gul Mohammad, Indian/Pakistani cricketer
- Gul Mohammed, Guinness world record holder as the shortest human being
- Gul Mudin (1994–2010), Afghan child premeditatedly murdered by United States troops
- Gul Rahman, Afghan torture victim
- Gul Hameed Khan Rokhri, Pakistani politician
- Gul Agha Sherzai, Afghan politician
- Gul Mohamad Zhowandai, Afghan poet
- Gul Rahman Qazi, Pashtun Afghan scholar, peace activist and politician

=== Females ===
- Gül Gölge (born 1981), Turkish model and actress
- Gul Panag (born 1979), Indian Bollywood actress
- Gul Panra (born 1989), Pakistani Pashto singer
- Gul Rukhsar, Pakistani Pashto Singer
- Gulalai Wazir, Pashtun Politician
- Gulalai Ismael, Human Rights Activist
- Gul Wareenah, a common pashtun girl name

== Surname ==
Notable people with the surname Gul or Gül include:

- Abdullah Gül (born 1950), Turkish politician and 11th President of Turkey
- Aftab Gul (born 1946), Pakistani cricketer
- Ajab Gul (born 1984), Pakistani actor-turned-director
- Amir Gul (born 1986), Pakistani footballer
- Awal Gul, Afghan prisoner of the United States at Guantanamo Bay Naval Base
- Dawd Gul, Afghan prisoner of the United States at Guantanamo Bay Naval Base
- Fahim Gul (born 1956), Pakistani squash player
- Faruk Gül, Turkish American economist
- Gerardus Gul (1847–1920), Dutch bishop of the Old Catholic Church of the Netherlands
- Hamid Gul (1936–2015), former Director General of Pakistan's Inter-Services Intelligence
- Khi Ali Gul, Afghan prisoner of the United States at Guantanamo Bay Naval Base
- Meirchion Gul, 5th-century king of Rheged (modern-day northern England)
- Mohammad Gul, Afghan prisoner of the United States at Guantanamo Bay Naval Base
- Roman Gul (1896–1986), Russian émigré writer
- Sahar Gul (born 1998), Afghan child bride tortured by her husband's family
- Sajjad Gul, Pakistani CEO
- Şifanur Gül (born 1997), Turkish actress
- Shabnum Gul (born 1963), Pakistani writer
- Umar Gul (born 1982), Pakistani cricketer
- Yekta Yılmaz Gül (born 1978), Turkish Greco-Roman wrestler

== See also ==
- Gul (disambiguation)
- Gull (surname)
- Gülmira/Gulmira/Gol Mir (ru:Гульмира)
- Gülnur/Gulnur
- Nurgül/Nurgul/Nurgyul
- Gülnar/Gulnar/Gulnara
- Nazgul
- Gulnaz
- Gulzhan/Guljan
- Gulzhanat
- Aygül/Aigul
- Songül
