= Naz =

Naz or NAZ may refer to:

- Naz (name)
- NAZ (studio), Japanese animation studio
- Naz, Iran, a village in Hormozgan Province, Iran
- Naz, Vaud, a former municipality in the canton of Vaud, Switzerland
- Naaz islands, a set of tidal islands in the Persian Gulf, south of Iran
- Nakhchivan Automobile Plant, an automobile manufacturer in Azerbaijan
- Nederlandse Artikelendatabank voor de Zorg, a Dutch healthcare database
- A peak in the Alborz mountain range of Iran

== See also ==
- Naaz (disambiguation)
- Nazz (disambiguation)
- Nas (disambiguation)
- Natz-Schabs (Naz-Sciaves), a municipality in South Tyrol, Italy
