= Gull (disambiguation) =

A gull is a bird in the family Laridae.

Gull or gulls may also refer to:

== Other animals ==
- Cepora, a genus of butterflies commonly called the Gulls
- Gull Dong, a breed of dog
- Gull Terrier, a breed of dog

== Business ==
- Gull Petroleum
- Gull (record label), a UK record label active between 1974 and 1984

== Geography ==
- Gull Glacier
- Gull Island (disambiguation)
- Gull Lake (disambiguation)
- Gull River (disambiguation)
- Gull (geology), a valley-side chasm associated with cambering

== People ==
- Gull (surname), list of people with this name
- Ernests Gulbis, a Latvian tennis player nicknamed "The Gull"

== Sports ==
- Salt Lake City Gulls, a former AAA minor league baseball team (1975–84)
- Newport Gulls, a summer collegiate baseball franchise currently in the NECBL
- San Diego Gulls (disambiguation), five different minor league hockey franchises
- Sylvan Lake Gulls, baseball team in the Western Canadian Baseball League
- Gull (dinghy), a small sailing boat

== Transportation ==
- Gull (dinghy), a sailing dinghy designed by Ian Proctor, in 1956
- Bonney Gull, an airplane with folding wings designed by Leonard Warden Bonney
- Gull wing, an aircraft's wing configuration with a prominent bend somewhere along the span, similar to that of a gull
- HMAS Gull, a ton class minesweeper
- Percival Gull, a British low-wing, wood-and-fabric monoplane
- The Gull, an international passenger train
- USS Gull, three ships in the United States Navy

== Other uses ==
- NRK Gull, a defunct Norwegian radio station
