= Gull River =

There are several places named Gull River:

Canada

- Gull River (Balsam Lake), Kawartha Lakes, Ontario, empties into Balsam Lake on the Trent-Severn Waterway
- Gull River (Lake Nipigon), Thunder Bay District, Ontario, flows east into Gull Bay on the western side of Lake Nipigon
- Gull River Formation, a geological formation in Ontario, Canada
- Gull River 55, a reserve of the Gull Bay First Nation in Ontario, Canada
- Former name for the town of Minden, Ontario

United States

- Gull River (Cass County), Cass County, Minnesota
- Gull River (Crow Wing River tributary), Minnesota
- Gull River (Turtle River tributary), Minnesota
- Gull River (Beltrami County), Beltrami County, Minnesota

== See also ==
- Gull (disambiguation)
- Gull Lake (disambiguation)
- Gull Island (disambiguation)
- Gull Glacier
- Sea Gull River in the U.S. state of Minnesota
