= Gol Mir =

Gol Mir (Persian: گل مير) may refer to:

- Gol Mir, Hirmand
- Golmir, Hirmand County
- Gol Mir, Zabol, a location in Sistan and Baluchestan Province, Iran

== See also ==
- Gol Mirak
- Gulmira (disambiguation)
