= Vocal sac =

Noise-producing organ in frogs and toads

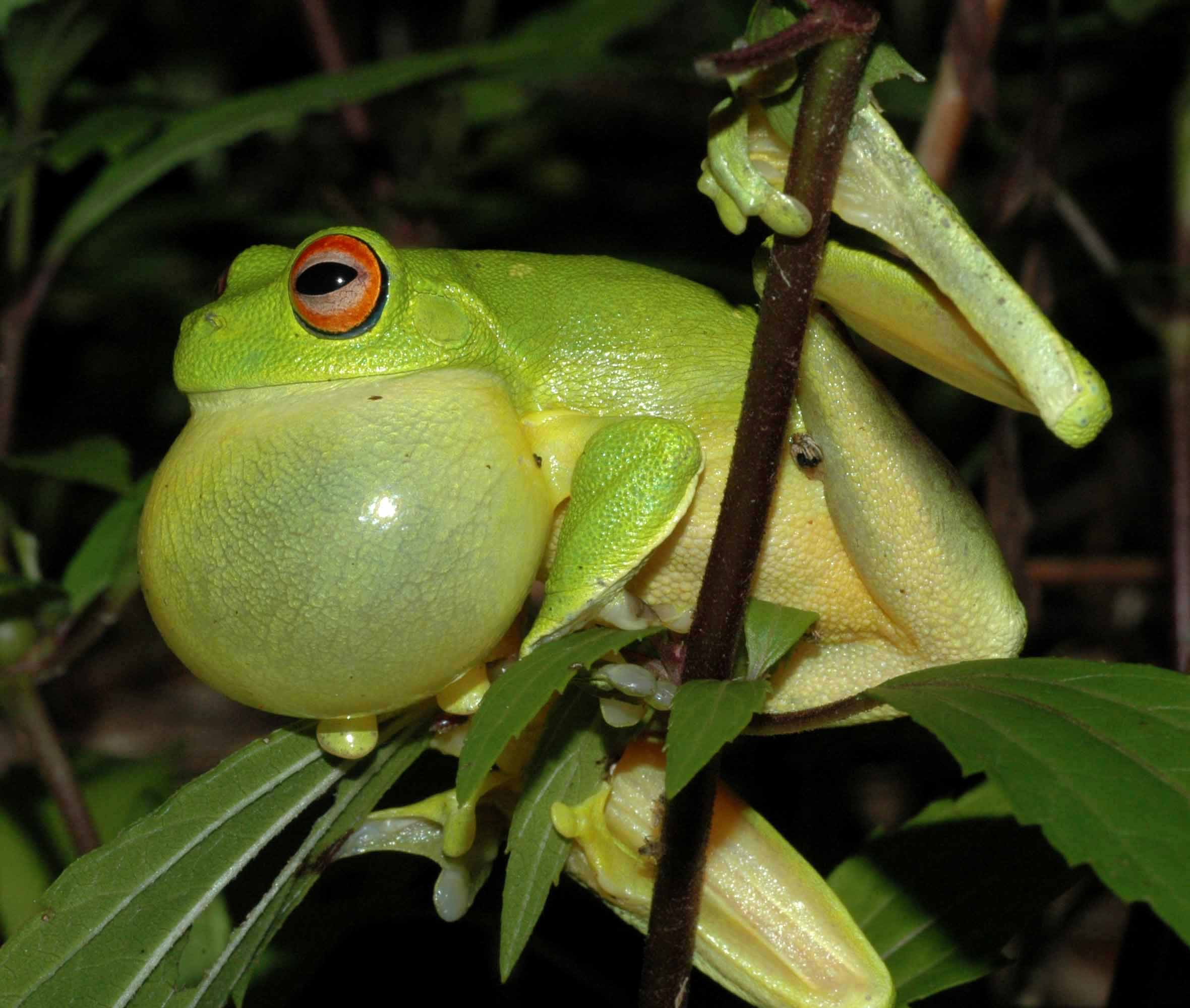
A fully distended vocal sac in an Australian red-eyed tree frog (Litoria chloris)

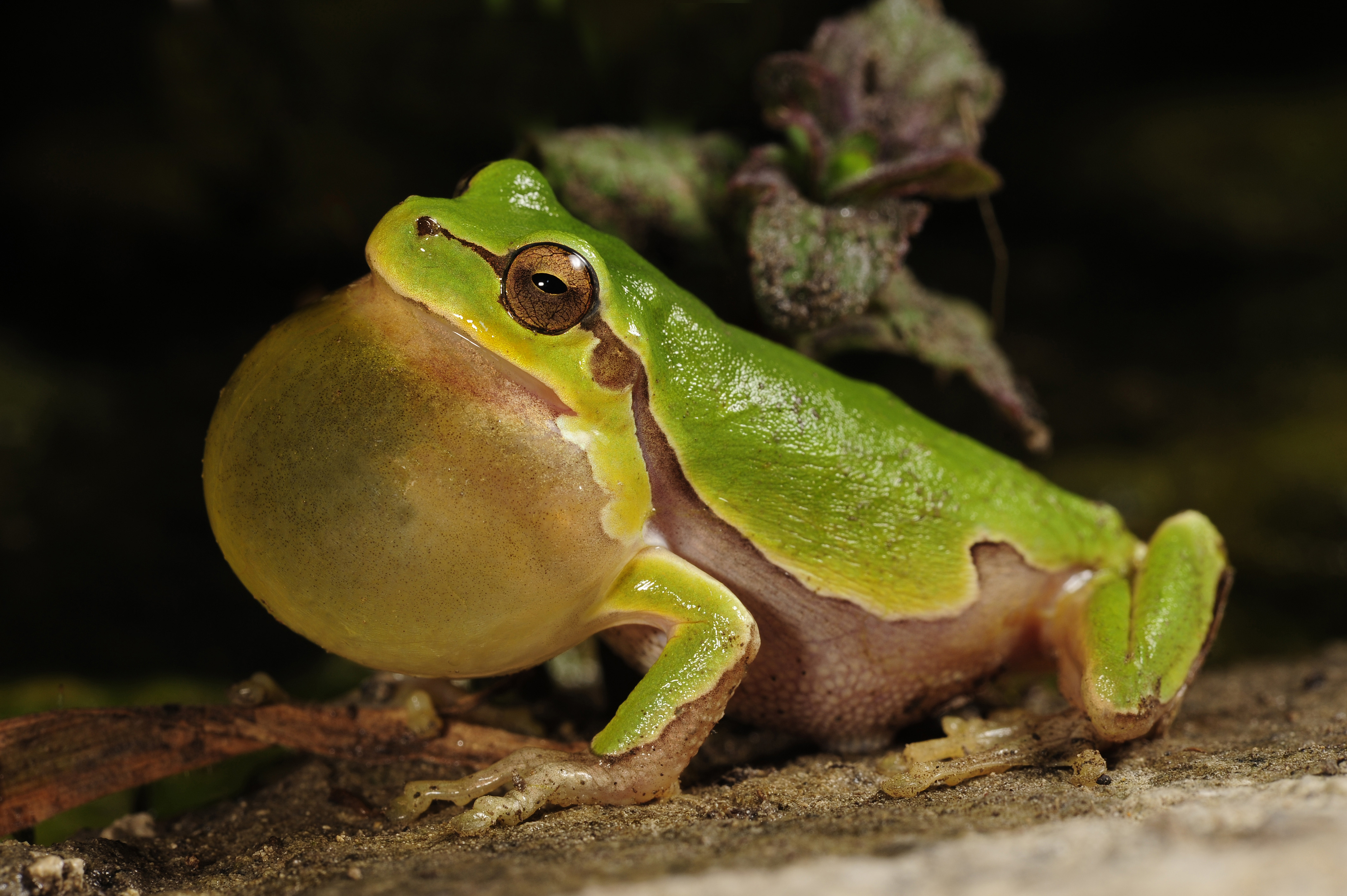
Italian tree frog (Hyla intermedia) with an inflated vocal sac

The vocal sac is the flexible membrane of skin possessed by most male frogs and toads. The purpose of the vocal sac is usually as an amplification of their mating or advertisement call. The presence or development of the vocal sac is one way of externally determining the sex of a frog or toad in many species.

The vocal sac is open to the mouth cavity of the frog, with two slits on either side of the tongue. To call, the frog first inflates its lungs as usual. Then, before expelling the air from its lungs, it shuts its nose and mouth. When it does expel the air through the larynx and into the vocal sac, the vibrations of the larynx emit a sound which resonates on the elastic membrane of the vocal sac. The resonance causes the sound to be amplified and allows the call to carry further. Muscles within the body wall force the air back and forth between the lungs and vocal sac.

== Development ==
The development process of the vocal sac can vary among the different species, but mostly follows the same process. The development of the unilobular vocal sac begins with two small growths on the floor of the mouth. These grow until they form two small pouches, which expand until they meet in the centre of the mouth and form one large cavity, which then grows until it is fully developed.

== Purpose ==
The primary purpose of the vocal sac is to amplify the advertisement call of the male, and attract females from as large an area as possible. Species of frog without vocal sacs may only be heard within a radius of a few metres, whereas some species with vocal sacs can be heard over 1 km (0.62 mi) away. Modern frog species (neobatrachians and some mesobatrachians) which lack vocal sacs tend to inhabit areas close to flowing water. The sound of the flowing water overpowers the advertisement call, so they must advertise by other means.

An alternative use of the vocal sac is employed by the frogs of the family Rhinodermatidae. The males of the two species of this family scoop recently hatched tadpoles into their mouth, where they move into the vocal sac. The tadpoles of Darwin's frog (Rhinoderma darwinii) remain in the vocal sac until metamorphosis, whereas the Chile Darwin's frog (Rhinoderma rufum) will transport the tadpoles to a water source.

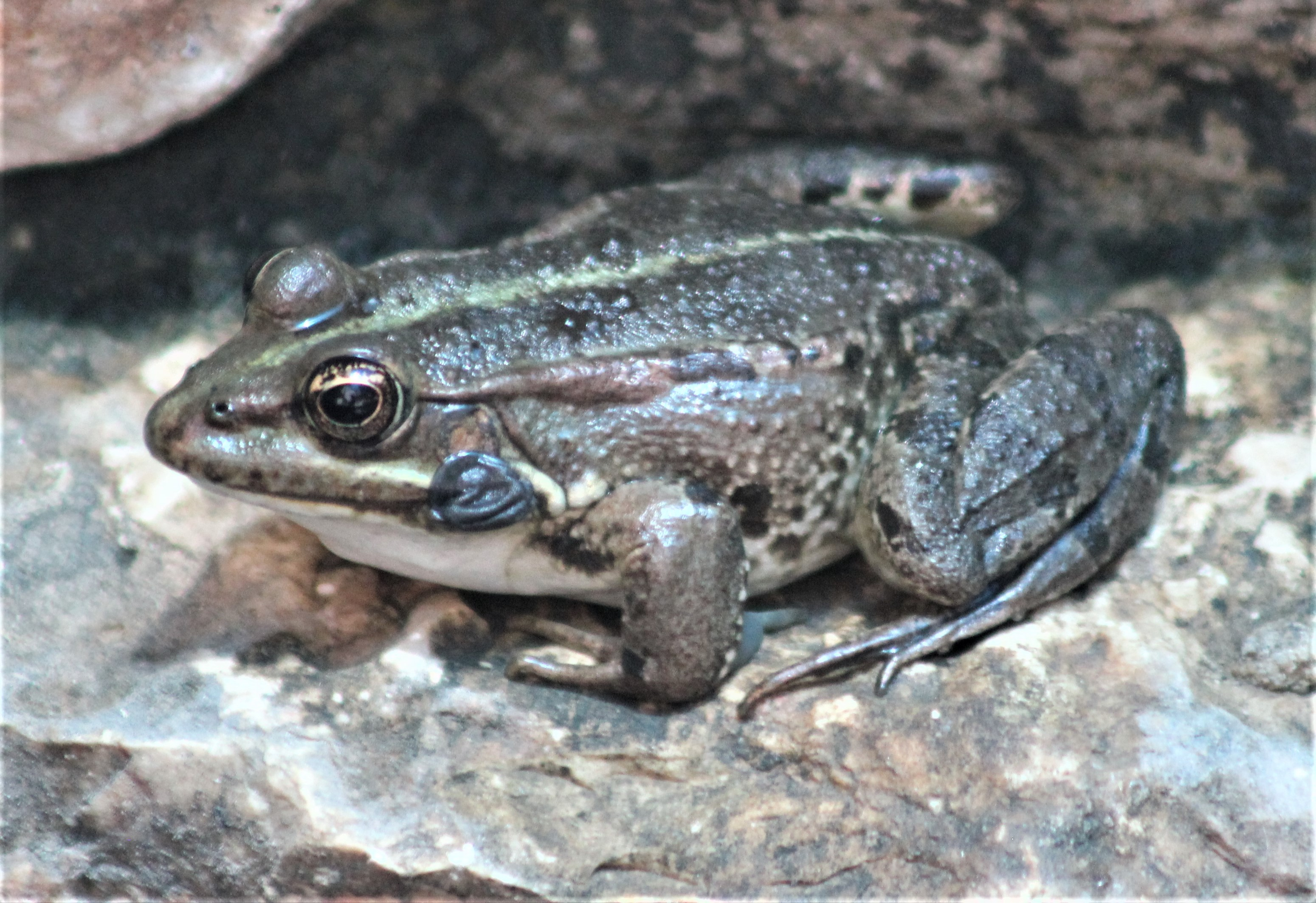
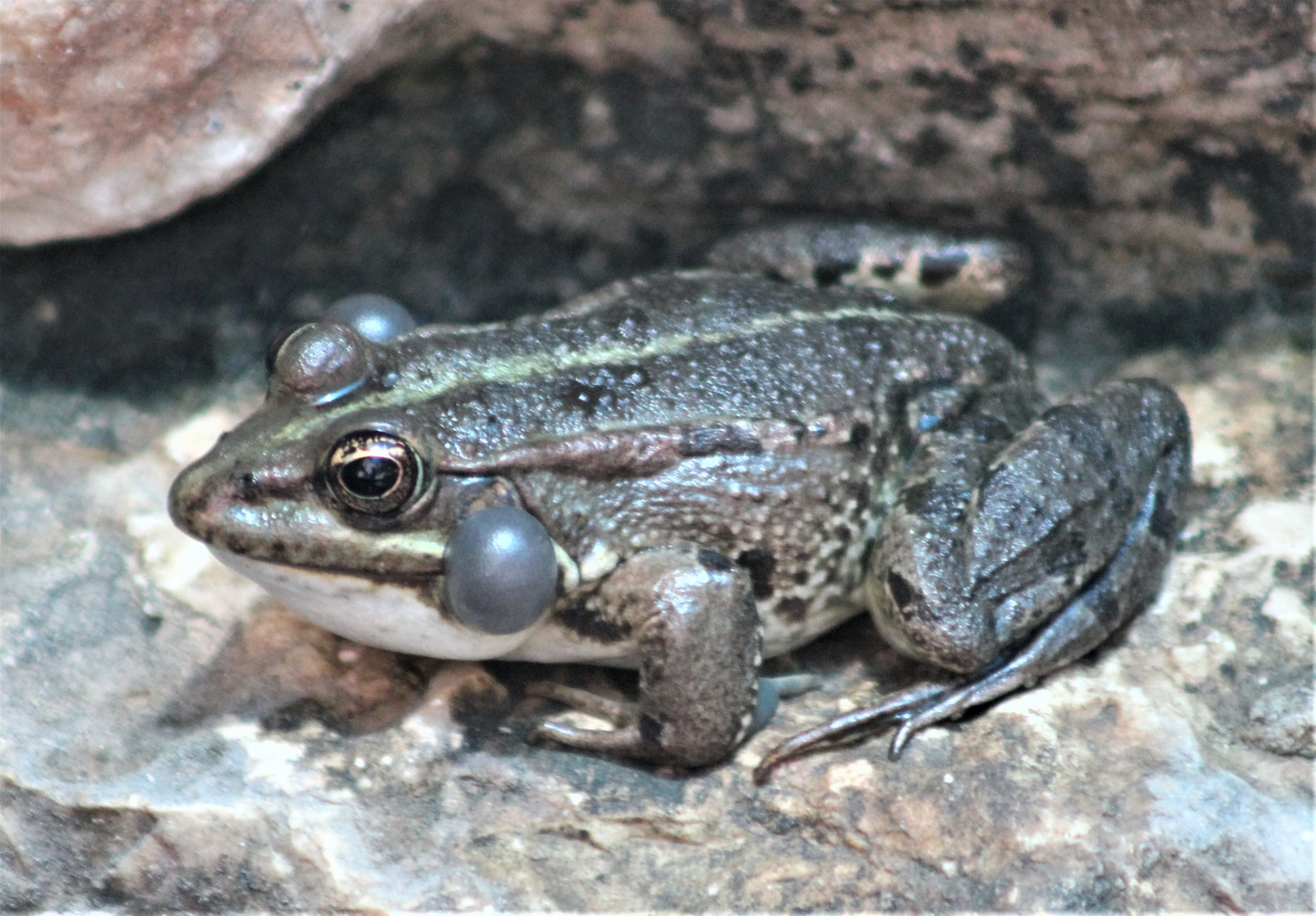
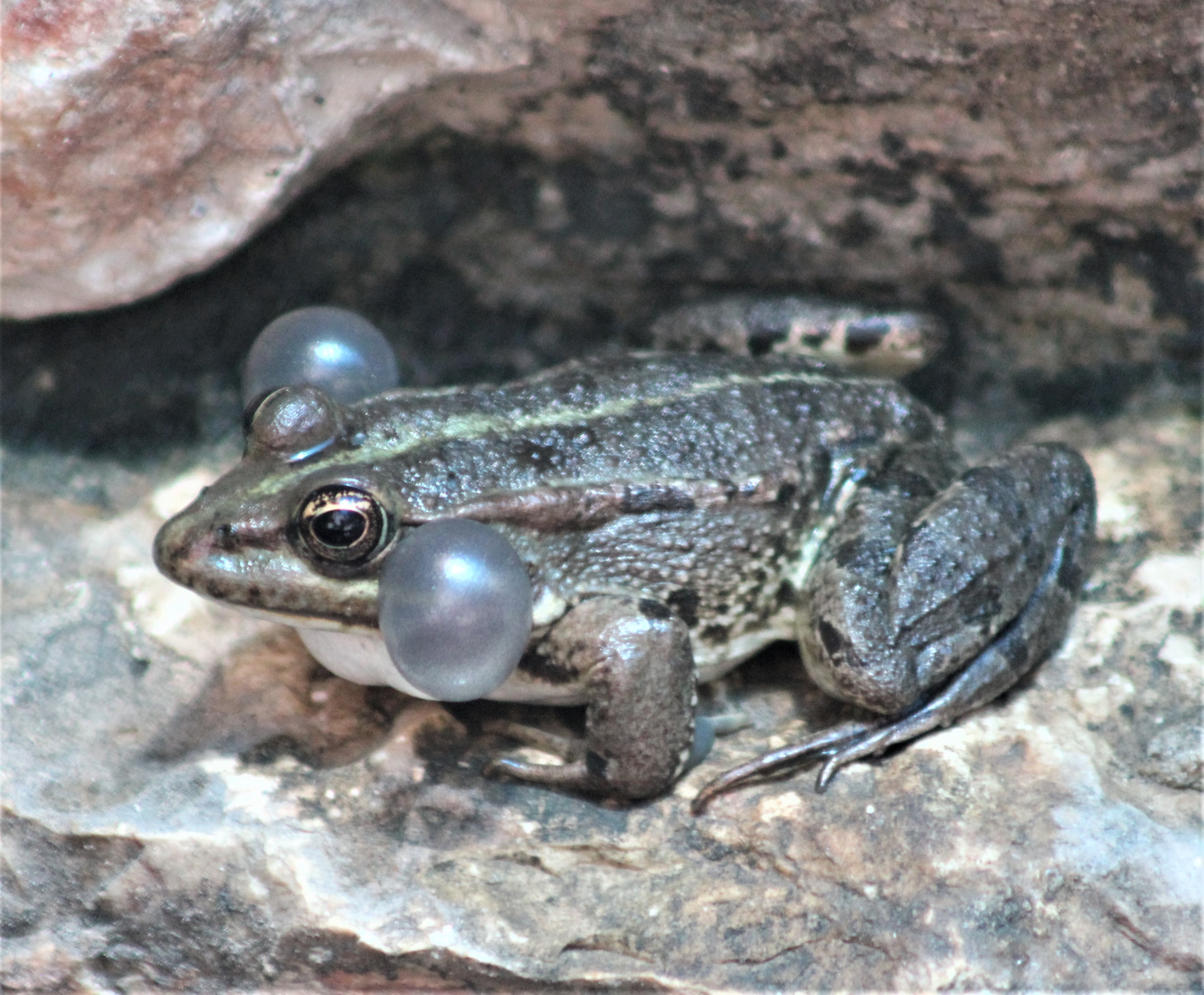
Marsh frog inflating vocal sac

== See also ==
- Animal communication
- Throat sac
