= Gulmira =

- Gender: Female

Origin
- Language: Kazakh

Other names
- Related names: Gul, Gulnur

Gülmira is a female given name. Notable people with the name include:

- Gulmira Dauletova (born 1988), Kazakh chess player
- Gülmira Esimbaeva (born 1957), Kazakh politician
- Gulmira Karimova (1977–2023), Kazakh teacher and politician

== See also ==
- Gul
- Gulnur
- Gol Mir
