= Ghandruk =

Ghandruk घान्द्रुक
- Traditionial Gurung Village
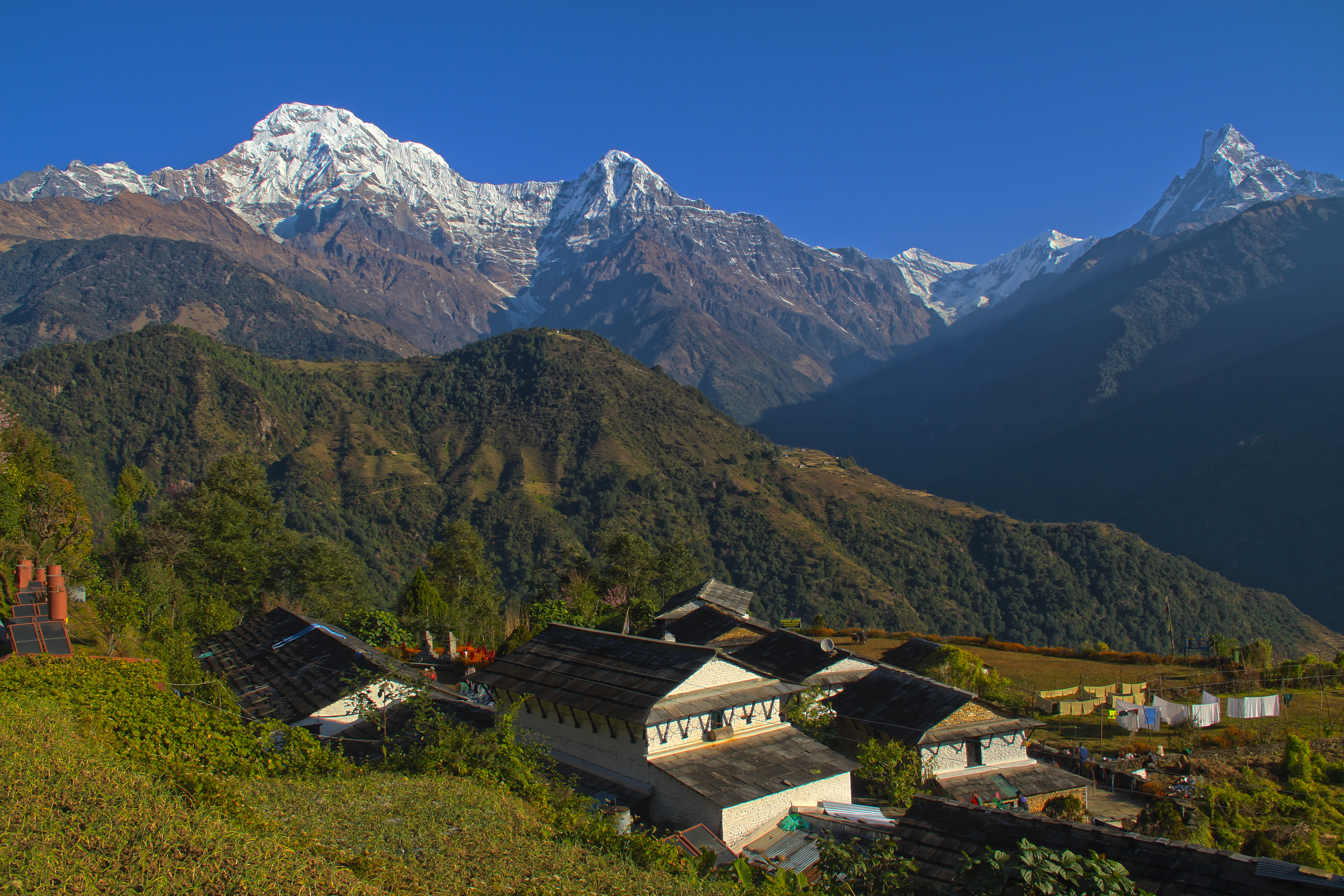
- A view of Annapurna range includes Annapaurna South (far left), Himchuli (Heuchuli), Gangapurna and Macchapucchre (Fishtail, dog or tiger) on far right from Ghandruk
- Nickname: Konda
- Location in Nepal Ghandruk (Nepal)
- Coordinates: 28.377°N 83.807°E
- Country: Nepal
- Province: Gandaki Province
- Municipality: Annapurna R. Municipality
- Elevation: 2,012 m (6,601 ft)

Population (2021)
  - Total: 5,316
- Time zone: UTC+5:45 (NST)

Ghandruk (Nepali: घान्द्रुक pronounced [ɡʱandɾuk]) is a picturesque traditional village nestled in the Annapurna Rural Municipality, Kaski District of the Gandaki Province of Nepal. Situated 32 km north-west to Pokhara, this traditional Gurung settlement sits at an elevation of 2,012 meters (6,601 ft) and serves as a key stop on several iconic trekking routes, including the Annapurna Base Camp and Annapurna Circuit treks.

The peaks of Mt Annapurna South (7,219 m), Mt Machapuchare (6,993 m), Gangapurna (7,455 m) and Mt Hiunchuli (6,411 m) can be seen from the village, and it is also the gateway to the Poon hill. Gurung communities comprise the major inhabitants of the village. The village is home to Shree Meshrom Baraha Secondary School, a government school which provides education to children aged 5–18. Local attractions include the Gurung Cultural Museum and Meshram Baraha temple. During festivals, locals celebrate with music, dance, and rituals that makes a blend of animist beliefs with Buddhist and Hindu traditions.

The village consists of 5,316 people, as of a population assessment in 2021. It is among the most substantial and established of Gurung communities in Nepal.

== Administrative Changes ==
Before 2015 Ghandruk was a separate VDC, now this village is in the Annapurna Rural Municipality. At the time of the 2021 Nepal census, it had a population of 5,316 residents in 1,228 individual households.

== Gallery ==
Sunrise in Ghandruk

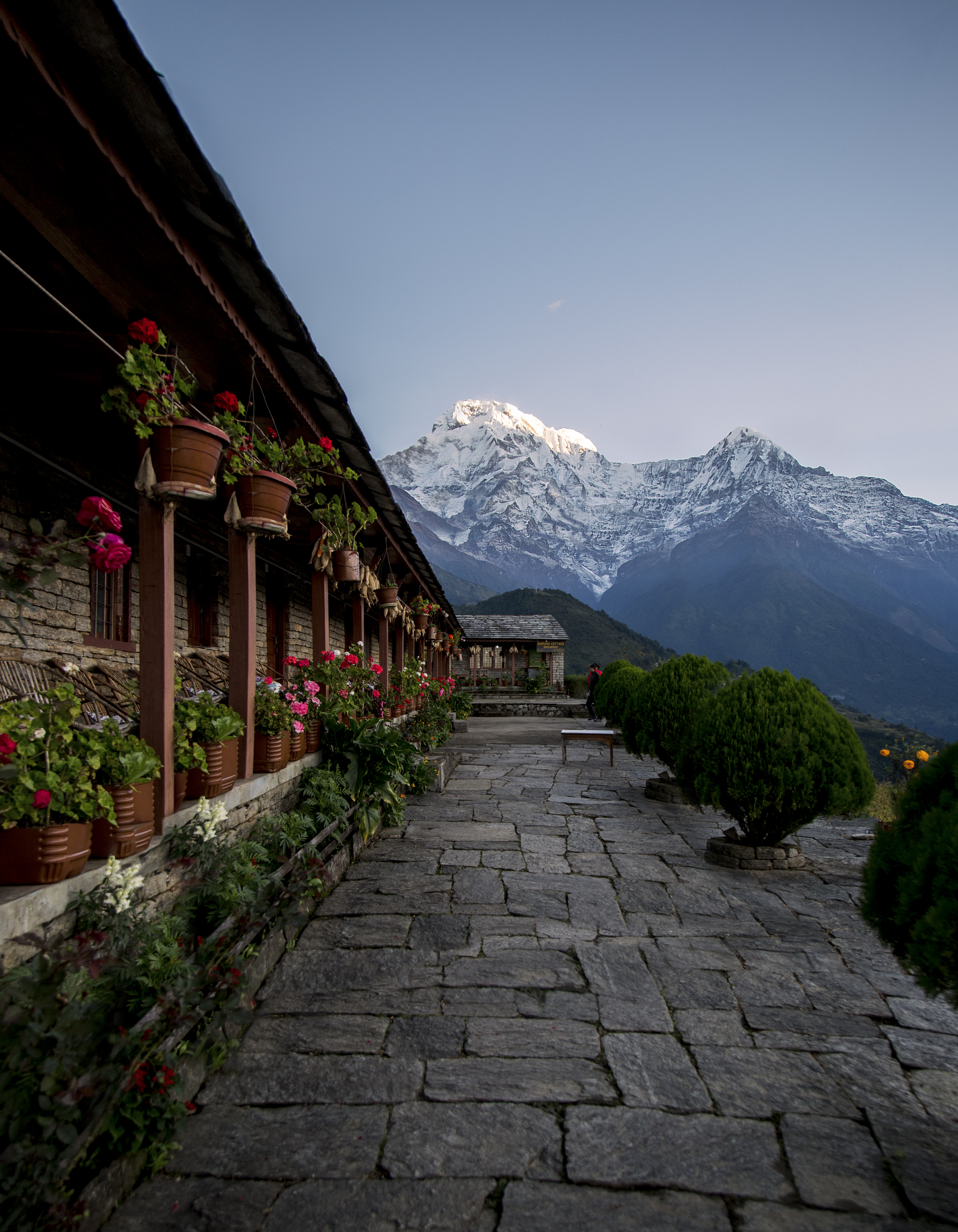
View from Ghandruk

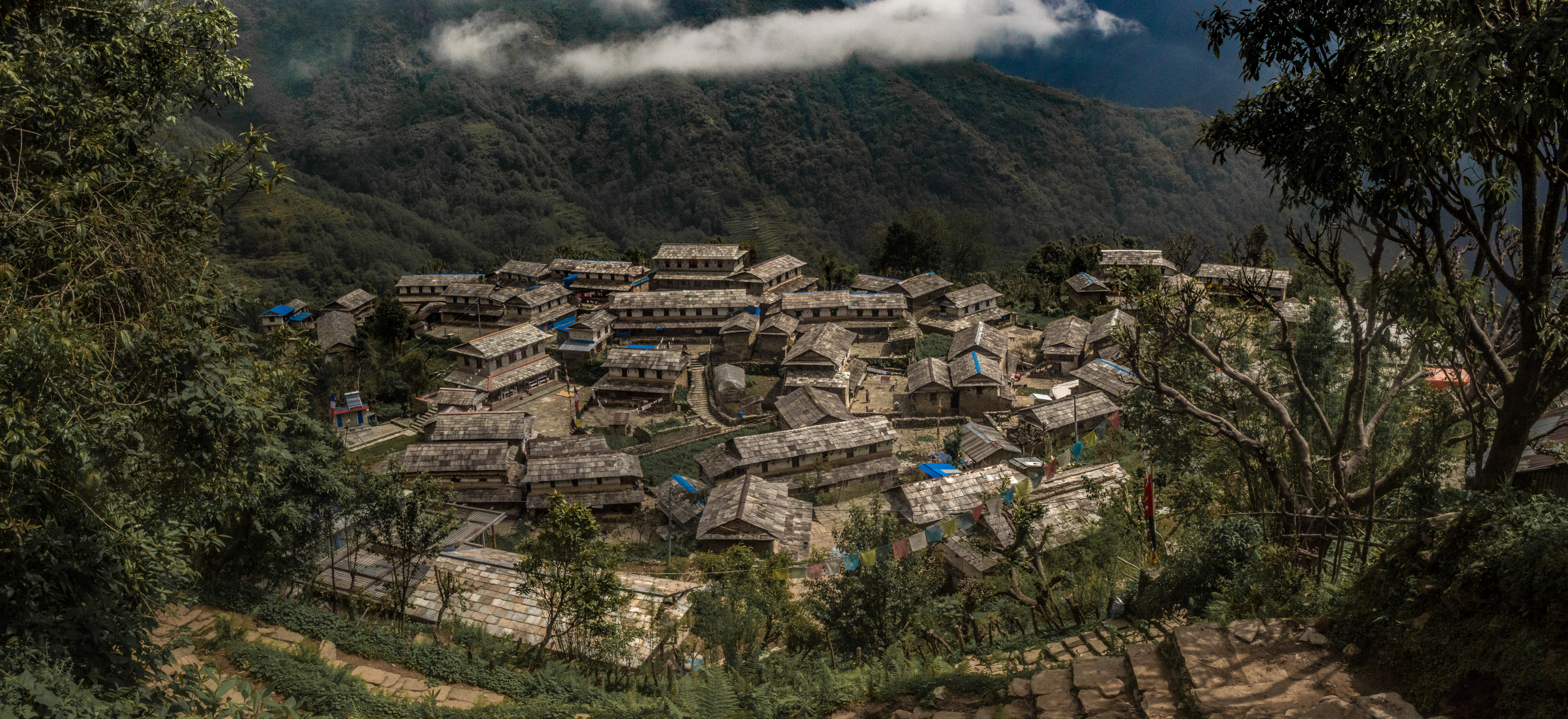
Top view of Ghandruk

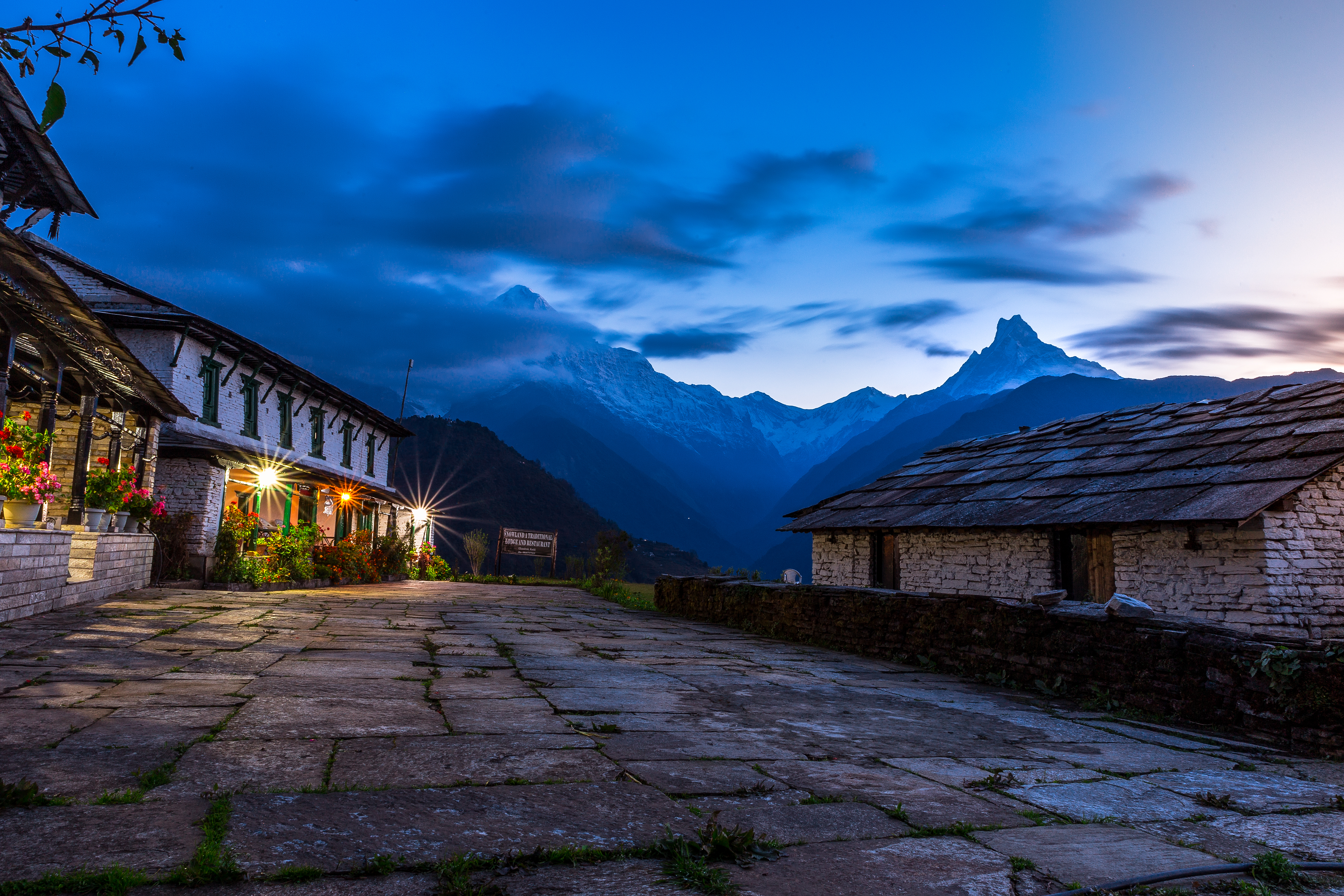
Dawn at Ghandruk

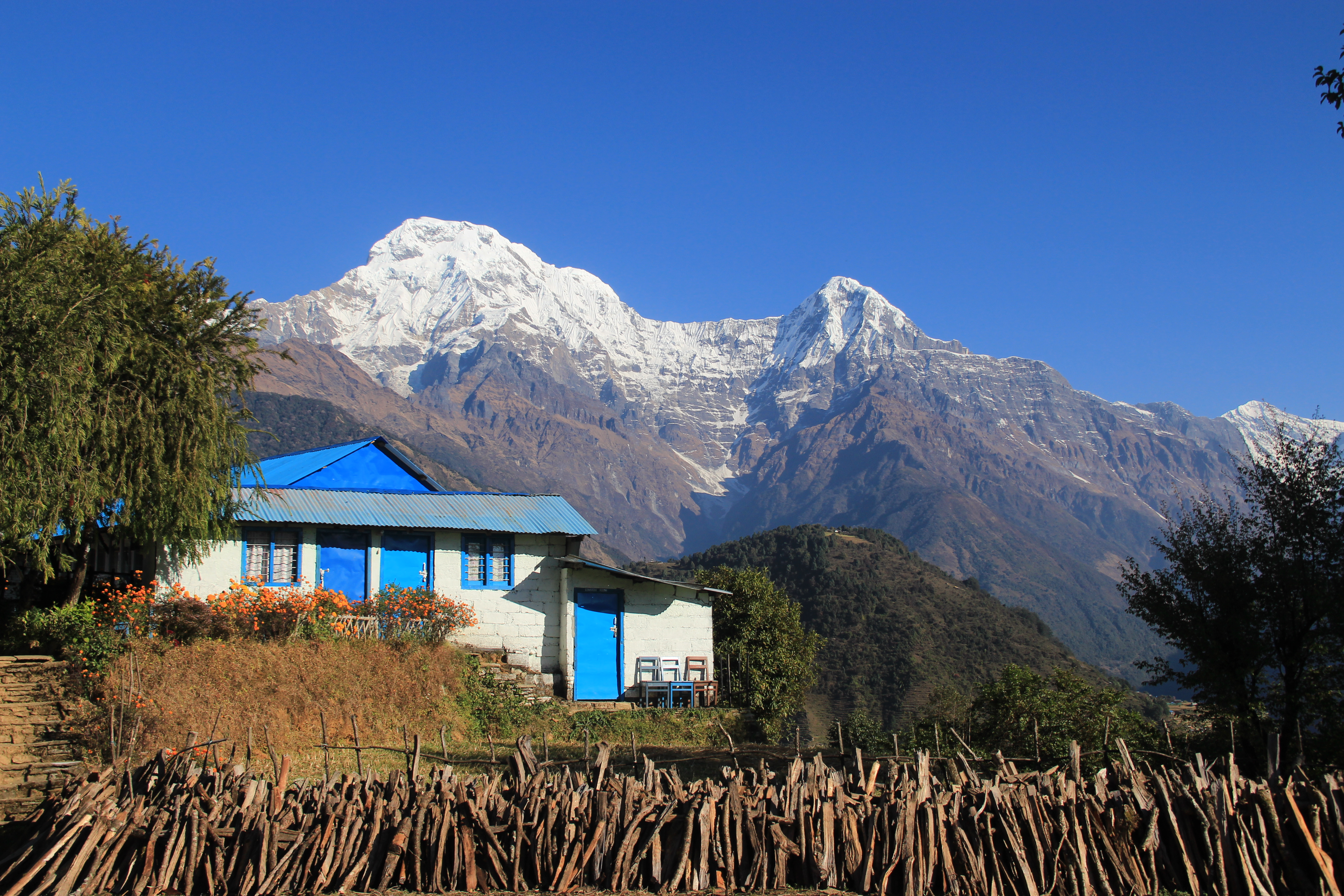
View from Ghandruk

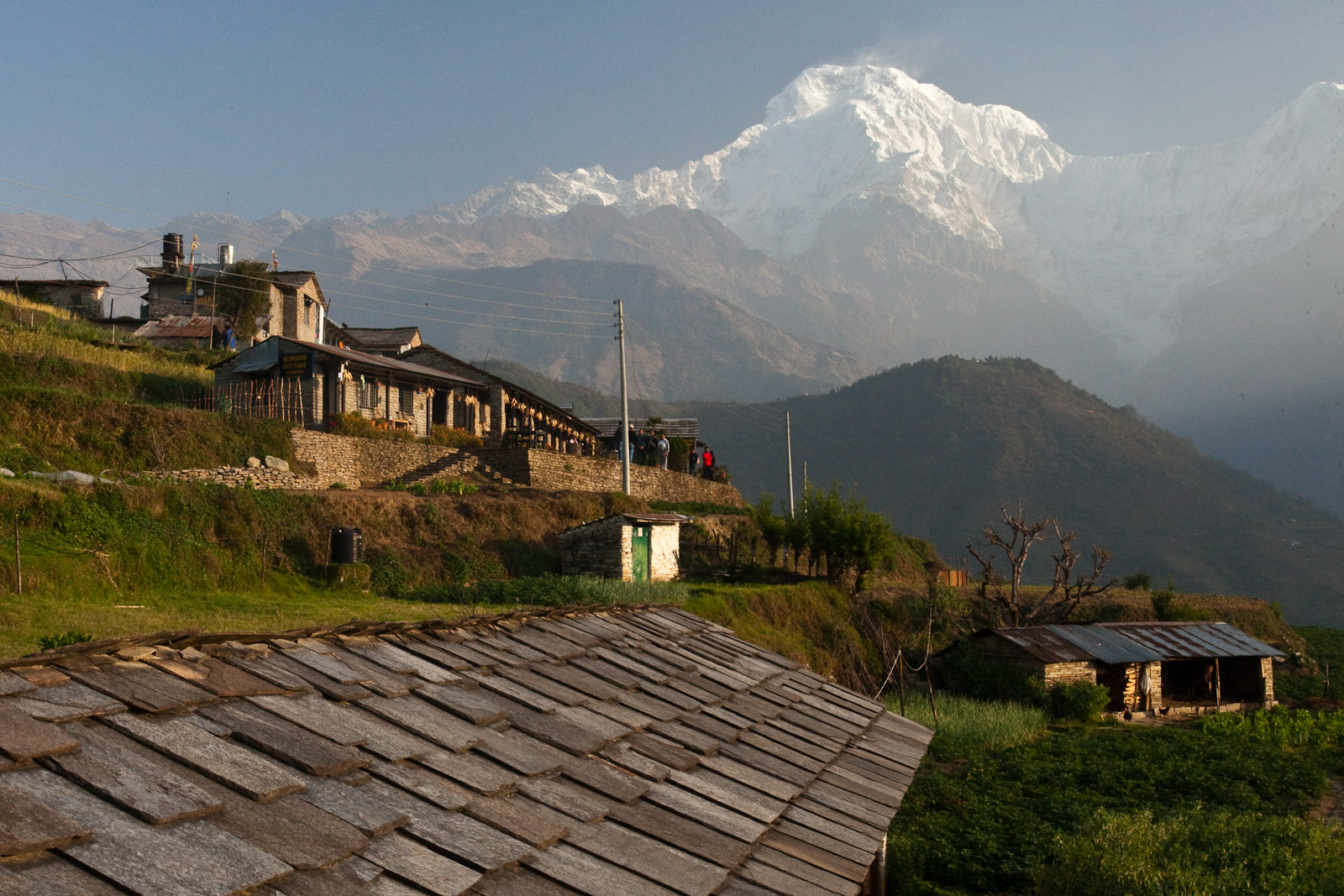
Annapurna South from Ghandruk

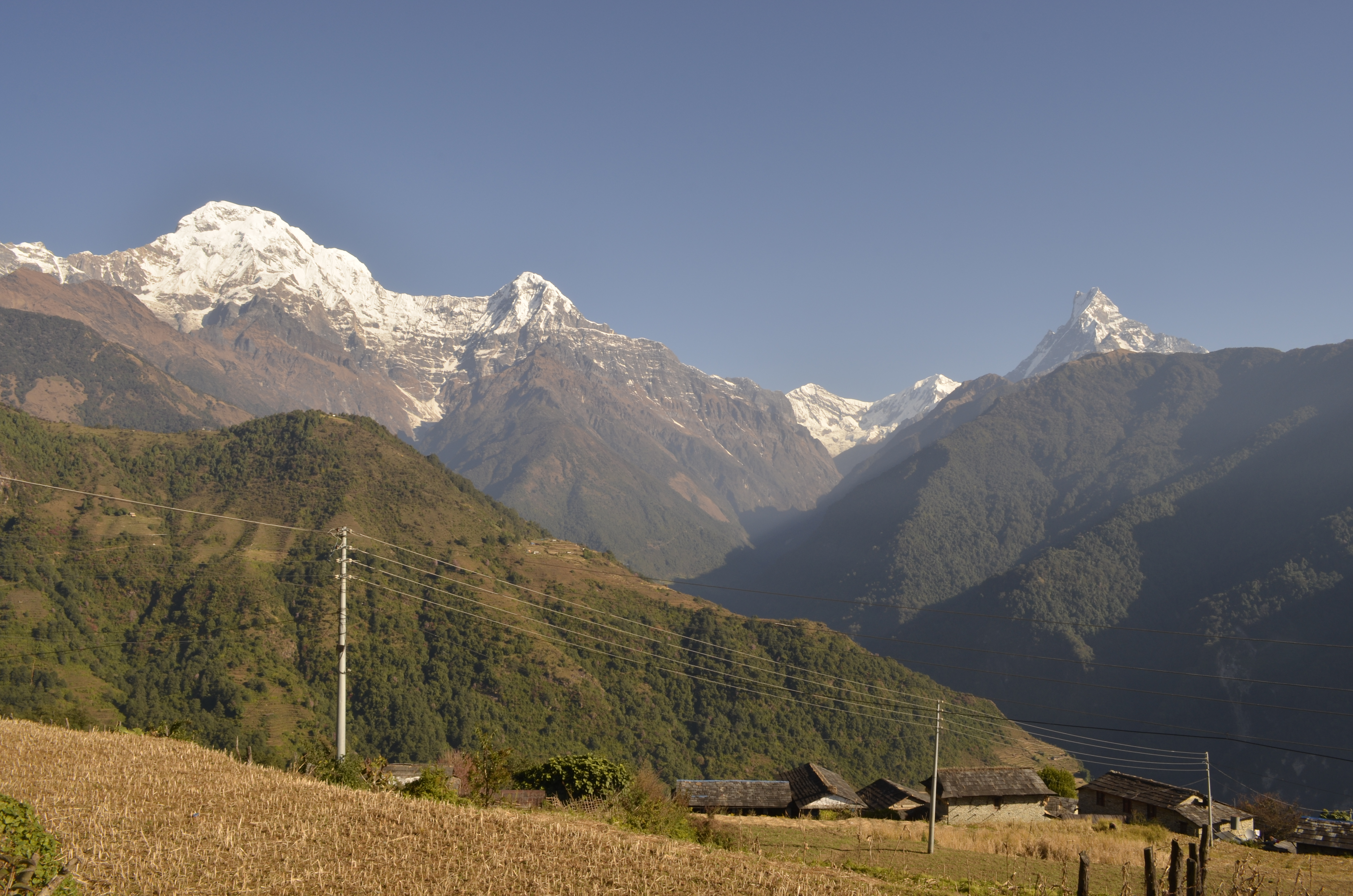
Annapurna South and Machapuchare from Ghandruk

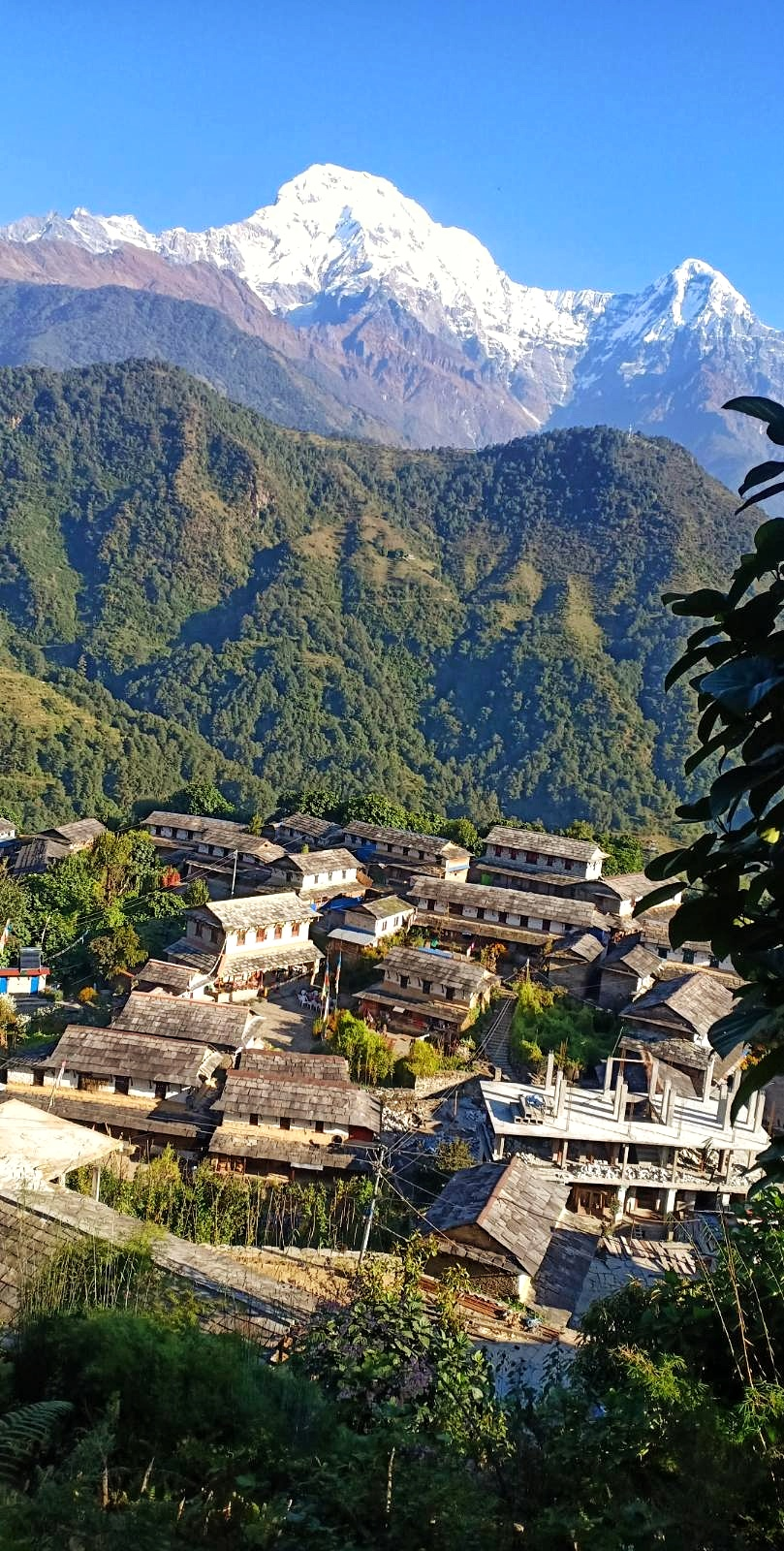
Ghandruk village
