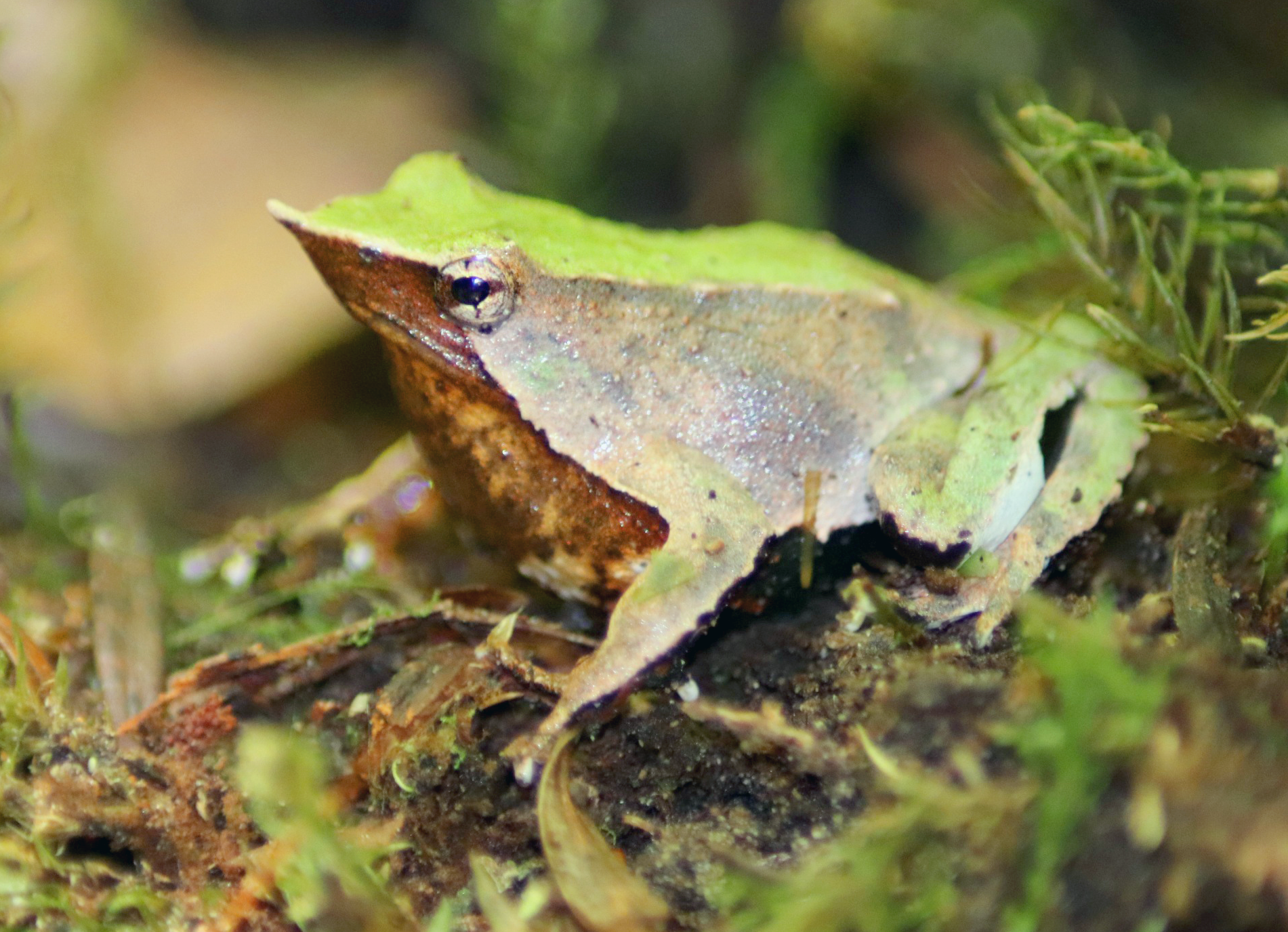

Conservation status
- Endangered (IUCN 3.1)

Scientific classification
- Kingdom: Animalia
- Phylum: Chordata
- Class: Amphibia
- Order: Anura
- Family: Rhinodermatidae
- Genus: Rhinoderma
- Species: R. darwinii

Binomial name
- Rhinoderma darwinii (Duméril & Bibron, 1841)
- Range in Chile in red (also occurs in adjacent southwestern Argentina)

= Darwin's frog =

Species of amphibian

Darwin's frog (Rhinoderma darwinii), also called the Southern Darwin's frog, is a species of frog of the family Rhinodermatidae. It was discovered by Charles Darwin during his voyage on HMS Beagle on a trip to Chile. In 1841, French zoologist André Marie Constant Duméril and his assistant Gabriel Bibron described and named Darwin's frog. The diet of R. darwinii consists mostly of herbivore invertebrates. R. darwinii is currently classified as an endangered species by the International Union for Conservation of Nature.

Darwin's frog has an unusual method of brooding, in which the male will facilitate development of his tadpoles inside his vocal sac. This male brooding may make R. darwinii unique among extant frog species, as the only other frog that has this behavior is the R. rufum (northern Darwin's frog), which has been presumed extinct since 1981.

== Characteristics ==
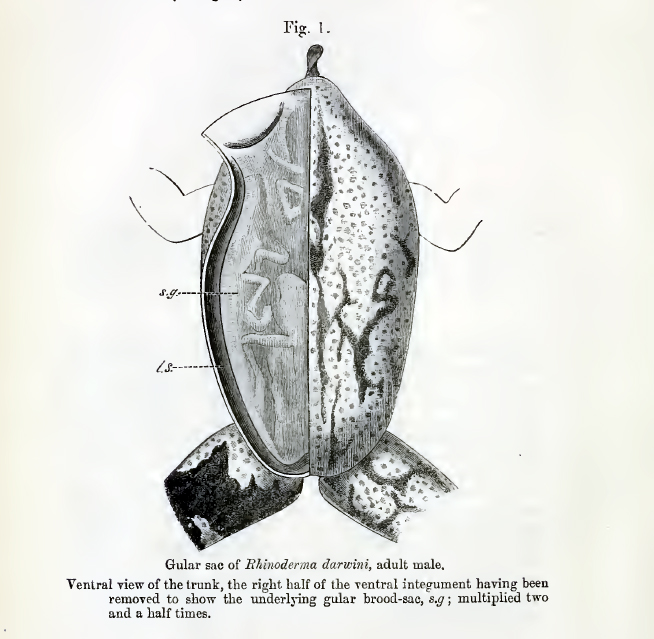
Ventral view of trunk

=== Size ===
Darwin's frog is a small species with a snout–to–vent length of 2.2 to 3.1 cm (0.9 to 1.2 in). The snout is elongated into a fleshy proboscis which gives the head a triangular shape. The limbs are relatively long and slender. The front feet are not webbed, but some of the toes on the back feet usually are.

=== Coloration ===
The upperparts of this species are variably colored in brown or green. Some brown individuals may have weakly defined V-shaped markings on the back, have central upperparts that are distinctly lighter brown than the flanks, or have whitish front limbs. Females are typically brown and tend to stay on substrates that match this color. Males are far more variable and occur on a wider range of substrates; in particular, brooding males often are often partially or completely green above. The throat is brownish and the remaining underparts are black with large white blotches in a pattern that is unique to each individual. In captivity, male R. darwinii have been shown to change color. These frogs that were initially brown changed to green over a year. This change in color is believed to be due to the green color of the environment these frogs were kept in.

== Habitat and distribution ==
Darwin's frog is found in Chile and Argentina at elevations as high as 1350 meters above sea level. R. darwinii is mainly found in the Valdivian Temperate Rain Forest which covers parts of both Chile and Argentina. In Chile, its range extends from Concepción Province to Palena Province and in Argentina from Neuquén Province and Río Negro Province. It is found in glades and forested areas at altitudes of up to about 1,100 m (3,600 ft) above mean sea level, in bogs and near slow-moving streams, and in a variety of vegetation types. It appears that a mixture of grassland, mossy areas, coarse woody debris, and young trees and bushes in a mature native forest provides its optimum habitat requirements. Short vegetation increases the retention of water while decreasing the temperature of the soil and providing concealment from predators. The population is fragmented and this frog has poor dispersal ability.

The Valdivian (their typical habitat) is decreasing in the north due to pine and eucalyptus agriculture expansion. This is removing some of the habitat of R. darwinii and forcing them south. The south Valdivian is more protected and is suitable for R. darwinii inhabitance.

Dispersal-constrained species distribution models have shown a decrease of up to 40% in habitat for R. darwinii over the years 1970 to 2010. The habitat for R. darwinii is expected to increase in the coming years. However, this emerging habitat is not likely to be inhabited by R. darwinii due to its inability to translocate to these new habitats.

Climate change is also expected to play a role in the habitat availability of R. darwinii. In the coming decades, R. darwinii is expected to have a reduced dispersion by up to 56%. This means that R. darwinii will be more localized to certain habitats in the future. R. darwinii populations are especially susceptible to damage due to wildfires. Using climate change models, wildfires are expected to increase at a dramatic rate which will negatively affect the R. darwinii habitat.

This frog has been observed in many protected parks: Lanín National Park and Nahuel Huapi National Park in Argentina and many more in Chile.

== Conservation ==
Darwin's frog has undergone significant population declines due to habitat loss and degradation, largely from conversion of native forests to tree plantations.

Since 2018, the species is classified as Endangered on the IUCN Red List. A 2013 study reported results of a population survey conducted from 2008 to 2012, which found the species at just 36 of 223 previously recorded habitat sites, with small populations at those sites. The recent change in its conservation category in IUCN from Vulnerable to Endangered, arose from the Chile's amphibian reevaluation workshop for the Red List (Soto-Azat et al., 2015). The justification for its current category is due to its limited occupation area (estimated at 264 km^{2}), severe fragmentation of its populations and continued decline.

Since October 2021, R. darwinii has been classified as Critically Depleted by the IUCN Green Status Assessment. It was determined that the survival of the species is highly dependent on conservation activities and its recovery potential is high.

=== Conservation efforts ===
Due to its decline in the wild, captive colonies have been established as a precaution at two zoos in Chile, the National Zoo (working with the US Atlanta Botanical Garden) and Concepción Zoo (working with the University of Concepción and Germany's Leipzig Zoo).

In 2017, the IUCN SSC Amphibian Specialist Group formed a Binational Conservation Strategy that brought together 30 different countries. The goal of this group is to study R. darwinii in order to improve conservation efforts. The group details the unique characteristics (mouth brooding) as one justification for this increased conservation effort. The goal of the group is to understand key aspects of information related to R. darwinii by the year 2028.

== Diet ==
The diet of R. darwinii's consists of detritivore, herbivore, and carnivore invertebrates. It has been observed to consume each type of invertebrate at a percentage consistent with their prevalence in the environment. The percentage at which carnivorous invertebrates are consumed is lower than herbivore or detritivore invertebrates. This difference can be explained because spiders are the predominant type of carnivore invertebrate prey that R. darwinii encounters. These spiders are able to evade the predation of R. darwinii effectively due to their evasion ability.

In the habitats where R. darwinii have been observed, there seem to be relatively high percentages of herbivore invertebrates. This could mean that R. darwinii seek environments with enriched herbivore invertebrates as a food source.

Rhinoderma darwinii style of predation has been characterized as "sit and wait". This method seems to conserve energy and allows R. darwinii to evade predators effectively.

== Reproduction ==
Male R. darwinii will call to attract females in an attempt to mate. It has even been shown that male R. darwinii will call when brooding. R. darwinii use non-linear vocal phenomena (NLP) in order to attract and communicate with mates. Darwin's frog has been shown to have distinct mating patterns based on population and body size. More research needs to be conducted in order to further explore the mating of R. darwinii.

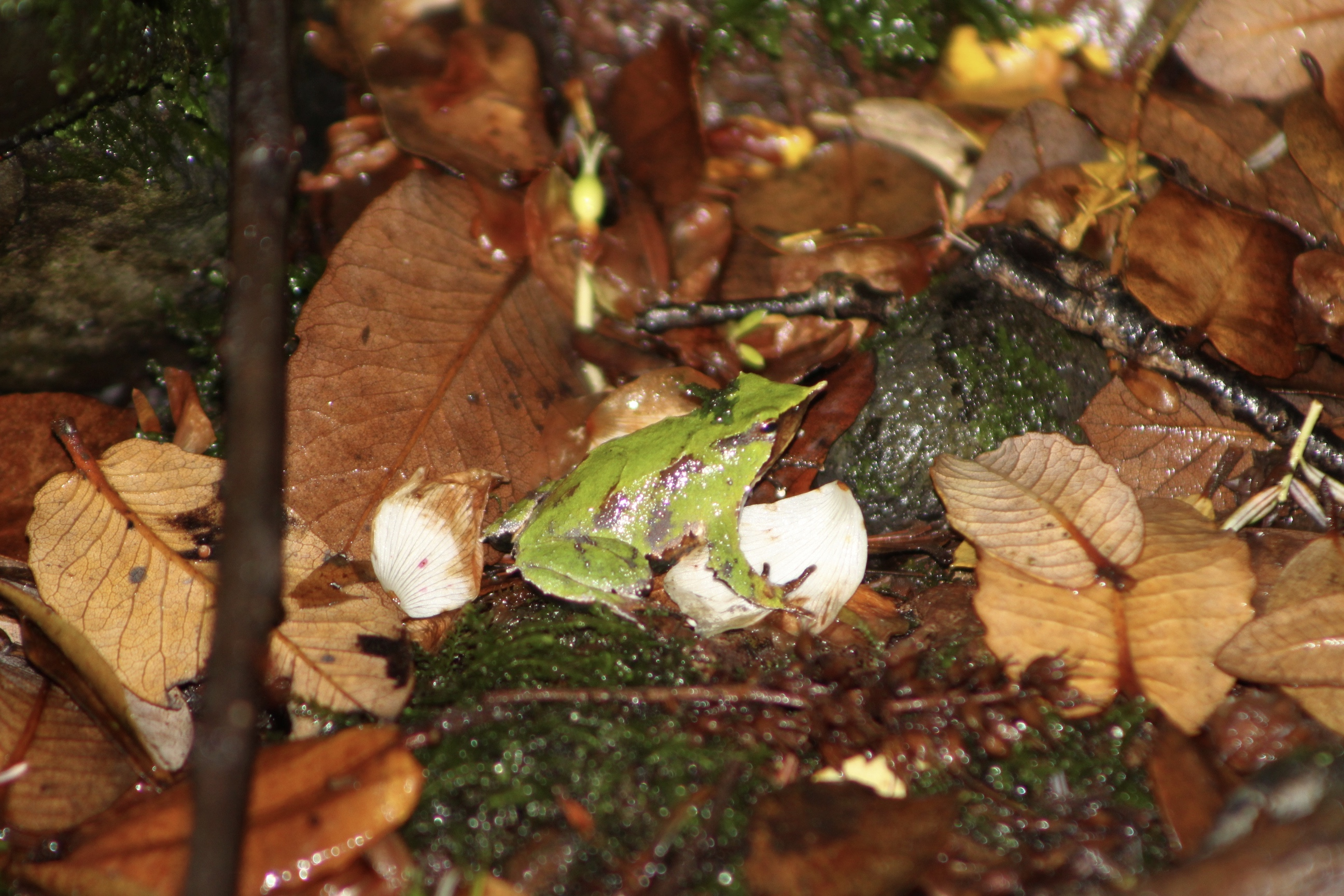
Most green individuals are brooding males.

However, no brooding males have been observed copulating with females.

Additionally, females will generally lay 4–10 eggs at a time. Males can brood 5–8 tadpoles at a time. In certain cases, the female R. darwinii can lay up to forty eggs in a single leaf litter.

== Parental care ==
The male, after about 3 to 4 weeks, notices the developing embryos beginning to move, and then he ingests the eggs and holds them in his vocal sac. Most brooding males are green colored individuals. The eggs hatch about 3 days later and the father continues to carry the tadpoles around in his vocal sac where they feed off their egg yolks and secretions produced by the wall of the sac until metamorphosis. At 6 weeks after tadpole ingestion, it was thought that the adult male does not consume food. However, in 1888 G. B. Howes dissected a brooding male R. darwinii and identified beetles and flies in his stomach. The large intestine of the adult male also resembled that of a normal individual. He concluded "that this extraordinary paternal instinct does not lead up to that self-abnegation." Following this, the small frogs hop out of the male's mouth and disperse.

=== Foster brooding ===
In captivity, R. darwinii parents have been observed to leave the eggs unattended for around 3 weeks (some R. darwinii males will guard the eggs for these 3 weeks). Further, captive males have been shown to exhibit alloparental behavior. Foster males have been shown to take a defensive stance at the eggs (oviposition defense). They will go so far as to defend the eggs from the birth father of the eggs and will subsequently brood the kin of other males. In one experiment, the foster father ingested 8 tadpoles, and after brooding had been completed, the foster father produced 2 frogs. This means that the metamorphosis process is not 100% efficient. This observation is consistent across studies and there exist some proposed explanations for the alloparental behavior, which is especially rare among amphibians.

Two hypotheses for this behavior have been proposed:

1. The first hypothesis is that foster fathers can improve upon their brooding skills by practicing. Improved brooding skills would result in males that can propagate more of their genes into the next generation.
2. The second hypothesis is that foster fathers can exhibit that they have had past breeding success by brooding tadpoles that aren't theirs. This means that these foster fathers are hoping that future mates will see them brooding and be more likely to mate with them.

These hypotheses propose ideas in which there is some advantage for males who brood offspring that are not theirs.

=== Loss of tadpoles in metamorphosis ===
The loss of some tadpoles in the metamorphosis from tadpole to frog is a unique feature of R. darwinii. This observation is likely explained by these hypotheses:

1. The tadpoles that did not survive were converted into nutrition for the foster male and he digested them.
2. The tadpoles died in the vocal sac of the foster male. The nutrients from these dead tadpoles served as sustenance for the surviving tadpoles occupying the vocal sac of the foster male. This phenomenon of one embryo consuming another is termed adelphophagy. The vocal sac of R. darwinii does not seem to have the proper structure to facilitate adelphophagy and thus this proposal is unlikely to explain the incomplete metamorphosis observed.

=== Territoriality ===
R. darwinii exhibit rare behavior in terms of territoriality and parental care. In anuran species, parental care and territoriality are positively related. In R. darwinii, there is high parental care due to the ingestion of tadpoles by fathers. However, there is low territoriality exhibited by these R. darwinii males. In fact, neither females nor males of R. darwinii have been observed guarding eggs. These observations of R. darwinii were used to further develop the relationship between territoriality and parental care by establishing the role of oviposition defense. These observations suggest that anurans will exhibit territoriality with parental care if they defend oviposition sites.

== Threats ==
Rhinoderma darwinii has been shown to be highly susceptible to the amphibian disease chytridiomycosis, caused by Batrachochytrium dendrobatidis fungal infection.

While R. darwinii seems to be less affected by chytridiomycosis when compared to other amphibians, chytridiomycosis can still infect and kill R. darwinii. Previous studies have supported the idea that chytridiomycosis could be somewhat responsible for the decrease in R. darwinii populations observed in Chile and Argentina.

In recent years, studies have shown that R. darwinii have shown variation in chytridiomycosis infection across populations. In populations where there were high infection rates, there are observed to be higher population growth rates. Similarly, in populations with low infection rates, there are observed to be lower population growth rates. Populations with higher infections rates seemed to have the highest reproductive rates. This means that even though many individuals are dying of infection, there are more individuals being born. There exists a positive relationship between infection rate and the number of juvenile individuals for R. darwinii.

This odd feature of chytridiomycosis infection and R. darwinii population growth prompted further investigation. The explanation for this observation is termed the "parasite-induced plasticity" hypothesis. This hypothesis says that individuals will devote more resources towards reproduction as opposed to survival. This increased devotion towards reproduction takes place over a single generation. This plasticity is beneficial to the infected individual because the infection will take over at some point so until that point the individual will try to have as many offspring as possible.

== Use in research ==
Rhinoderma darwinii have been used to study size variation in body size of ectotherms. Previous research supported the hypothesis that larger body sizes were tied to higher seasonality because of an idea termed starvation resistance. Starvation resistance is the idea that the larger the size of an ectotherm, the less likely it is to "starve", as it can use its body's mass for fuel.

However, work done on R. darwinii supports another hypothesis. The name of the hypothesis supported by the experiment that shows greater seasonality leads to longer periods of time in the cold is termed the hibernation hypothesis. These animals in the cold are likely to hibernate and under hibernation will have a lower basal metabolic rate. This will lead to lower amounts of energy expended, and thus less of the ectotherm's body mass will be lost. This explanation offers an alternative to the starvation resistance hypothesis.

Rhinoderma darwinii seem to be chosen in this research due to their broad distribution in the habitats they reside in. This allows for researchers to study the same species in different climates, an important aspect in order to make claims about the relationship between body size and seasonality/climate.

== See also ==
- Gastric-brooding frog

== Sources ==
- Crump, M.L. (2003). Grzimek's Animal Life Encyclopedia, 2nd ed., Vol. 6 Amphibians, 175, Gale.
- Duellman, W.E., ed. (1999). Patterns of Distribution of Amphibians: A Global Perspective, 325, The Johns Hopkins University Press.
- Frost, D.R., ed. (1985). Amphibian Species of the World: A Taxonomic and Geographical Reference, 551, Allen Press, Inc. and the Association of Systematics Collections, Lawrence, Kansas.
