= Gul =

Gul or GUL may refer to:

== Places ==
- Gul, South Khorasan, Iran
- Gul, West Azerbaijan, Iran
- Gul Circle, Singapore

== Other uses ==
- Great Liberal Union (Spanish: Gran Unión Liberal; GUL), a Nicaraguan political party
- Gul (design), a design element in oriental carpets
- Gul (name)
- Gul (toothpaste), a tobacco preparation used in Central Asia and eastern India
- Gul (watersports), a British watersports apparel manufacturer
- Gül Mosque, in Istanbul, Turkey
- Gül Train, a freight train service between Pakistan and Turkey via Iran
- Gul, a fictional Cardassian military rank in the Star Trek franchise
- Goulburn Airport, IATA airport code "GUL"

== See also ==
- Ghoul (disambiguation)
- Gular (disambiguation)
- Gull (disambiguation)
- Gulmohar (disambiguation)
