= Throat (disambiguation) =

The throat is the anterior part of the neck.

Throat or Throats may also refer to:

- Throat, the corner at the front of the head of a four-sided sail
- Throat, the constricted or narrow part of a passage, especially a pipe
- Throat, as in the freebore of a firearm.
- "Lump in one's throat", see Globus pharyngeus
- Throat halyard, after that part of the sail it acts on
- Camera lens throat, inner diameter of a camera lens mount
- Throat singing (disambiguation)

== See also ==
- Gular (disambiguation)
