= Gull wing (disambiguation) =

A gull wing is an aircraft wing configuration.

Gull wing, gull-wing or gullwing may also refer to:

== Places ==
- Gull Wing Bridge, a bascule bridge in Lowestoft, England
- Gullwing Lake, a freshwater lake near Dryden, Ontario, Canada

== Transportation ==
- Gull-wing door, a car door that is hinged at the roof
- Mercedes-Benz 300 SL, the "Gullwing", a car

== Other uses ==
- Gull wing, a format for leads of a small outline integrated circuit
- Gull-wing deformity of erosive osteoarthritis
- The Gullwings (Japanese: カモメ団, romanized: Kamome Dan, lit. 'Seagulls'), a fictional group from Final Fantasy X; see Characters of Final Fantasy X and X-2

== See also ==
- Wing (disambiguation)
- Gull (disambiguation)
