= Naaz =

Naaz may refer to:

== People ==
- Falaq Naaz (born 1991), Indian television actress
- Farha Naaz (born 1968), Bollywood actress
- Kumari Naaz, a stage name of Bollywood actress Salma Baig (1944–1995)
- Ruhi Naaz, Nepali politician
- Shafaq Naaz (born 1993), Indian television actress
- Naaz Joshi (born 1984), Indian trans rights activist and motivational speaker
- Naaz Khialvi (1947–2010), Pakistani lyricist and radio broadcaster
- Naaz Mohammed (born 1998), stage name Naaz (singer), Dutch–Kurdish singer
- Meena Kumari (1933–1972), Indian film actress, singer and poet who used the pen name Naaz

== Other uses ==
- Naaz Islands, in the Persian Gulf

== See also ==
- Naz (disambiguation)
