= Nazgul (disambiguation) =

Nazgûl are fictional undead men from The Lord of the Rings.

Nazgûl may also refer to:

- Nazgûl, a fictional rock and roll band in George R. R. Martin's novel The Armageddon Rag

== People ==
Nazgul is a given name, a compound of Naz (name) and Gul (name) is a common Persian and Turkish feminine given name meaning "Shy rose". Notable people with the name include:

- Nazgul Kenzhetay (born 1995), Kazakh journalist
- Leila Nazgül Seiitbek (born 1979) Kyrgyz rights activist and lawyer

== See also ==
- Gulnaz (disambiguation)
