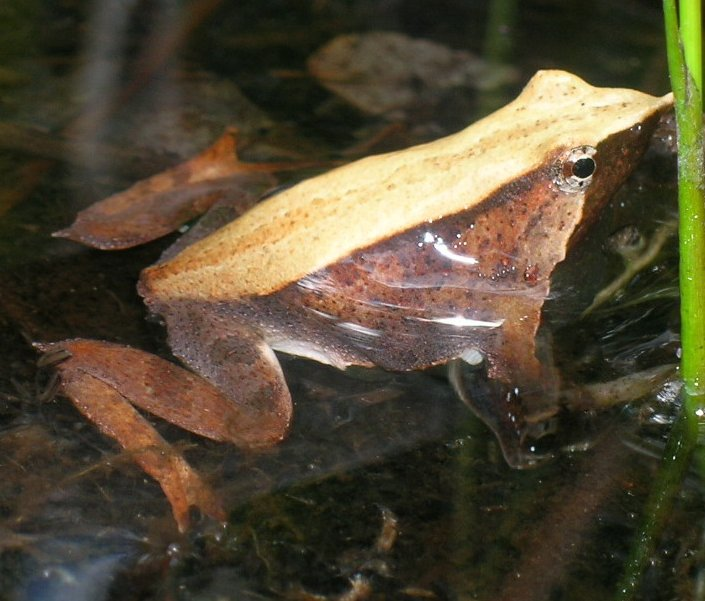
- Darwin's frog (Rhinoderma darwinii)

Scientific classification
- Domain: Eukaryota
- Kingdom: Animalia
- Phylum: Chordata
- Class: Amphibia
- Order: Anura
- Suborder: Neobatrachia
- Superfamily: Hyloidea
- Family: Rhinodermatidae; Bonaparte, 1850
- Genus: Rhinoderma; Duméril & Bibron, 1841

Species
- R. darwinii R. rufum
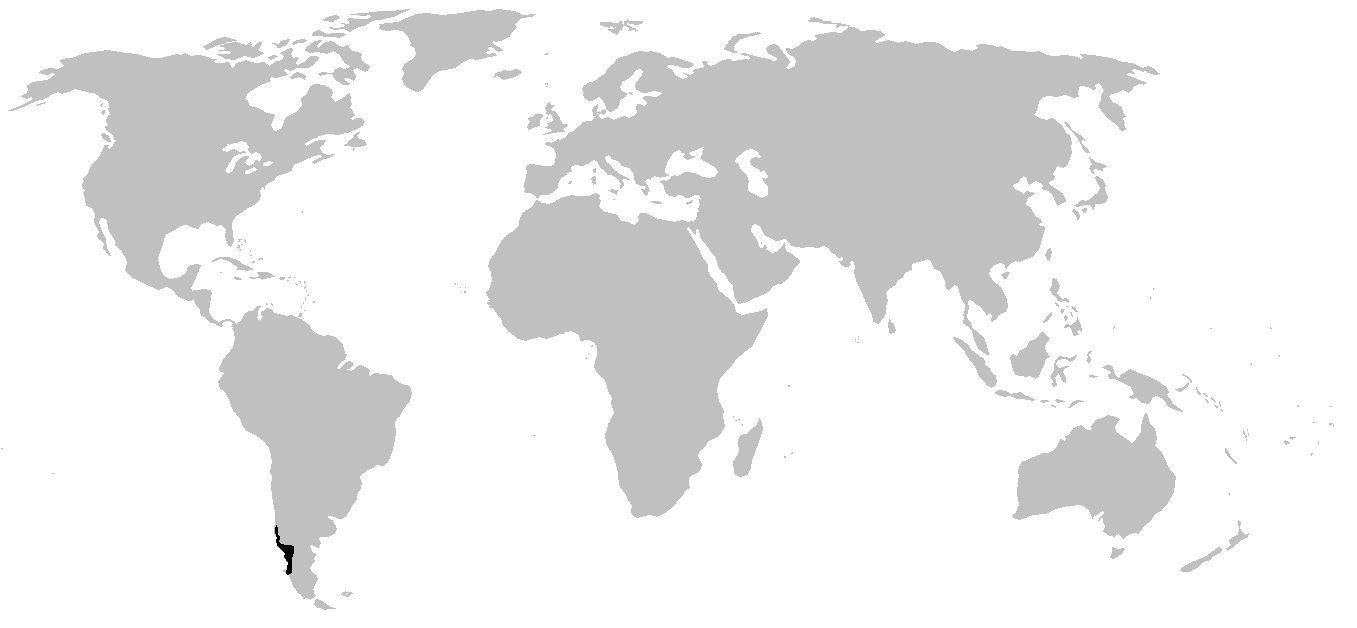
- Distribution of Rhinodermatidae (in black)

= Rhinoderma =

Genus of amphibians

Rhinoderma, commonly known as Darwin's frogs or mouth-breeding frogs, is a genus of small frogs found in Chile and adjacent parts of Argentina. It has just two species, of which the Chile Darwin's frog (R. rufum) is highly endangered or may already be extinct. The better-known Darwin's frog (R. darwinii) is endangered.

Both species are notable for their unusual breeding, with the tadpoles being raised inside the mouths of the males. The eggs are laid on the ground. The male frog guards the eggs for some time. When they are partially developed, he takes them up into his enlarged vocal sac. In the Chile Darwin's frog, the tadpoles remain in the vocal sac until their jaws and digestive organs develop. Then the male releases them into water, where for the duration of their development. The male Darwin's frog secretes viscous substances inside his vocal sac, which provide nourishment for the developing tadpoles. They reside in the vocal sac until they metamorphosize into froglets. Scientists suspect that the Chile Darwin's frog may also provide nourishment in this way, but as of the 2000s, this had yet to be confirmed.

Darwin's frogs are small, reaching a size of only 3 cm (1.2 in) in length. They are predominantly brown or green frogs, and have long, narrow noses. They are primarily terrestrial.

== Species ==
There are two species in this genus:

- Rhinoderma darwinii Duméril and Bibron, 1841
- Rhinoderma rufum (Philippi, 1902)
