= Aigul =

Aigul (Ai (Moon) + Gül (flower), Russian: Айгуль) is a Turkic feminine given name. Notable people with the name include:

== People ==
- Aigul Jeenbekova (born 1968), First Lady of Kyrgyzstan
- Aigul Japarova (born 1973), First Lady of Kyrgyzstan
- Aigul Gareeva (born 2001), Russian racing cyclist
- Aigul Akhmetshina, mezzo-soprano graduated from Ufa State Institute of Arts
- Aigul Kemelbayeva (born 1965), Kazakh writer

== In fiction ==
- Aigul in The Boy's Word: Blood on the Asphalt

== See also ==
- Aygül
