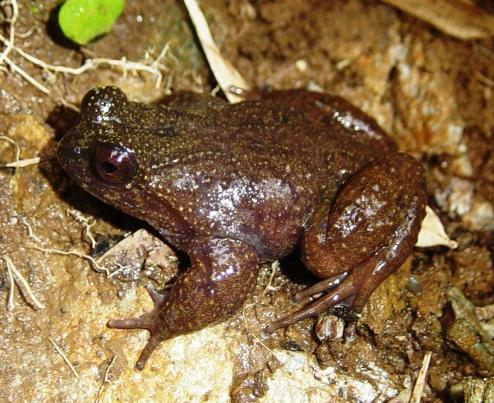

Conservation status
- Endangered (IUCN 3.1)

Scientific classification
- Kingdom: Animalia
- Phylum: Chordata
- Class: Amphibia
- Order: Anura
- Family: Rhinodermatidae
- Genus: Insuetophrynus; Barrio, 1970
- Species: I. acarpicus

Binomial name
- Insuetophrynus acarpicus Barrio, 1970

= Insuetophrynus =

Genus of amphibians

Insuetophrynus is a monotypic genus of frogs in the family Rhinodermatidae. The sole species is Insuetophrynus acarpicus, also known as Barrio's frog. It is endemic to Chile and only known from few localities on the Valdivian Coast Range between Chanchán in the Los Ríos Region in the south and Queule (southernmost Araucanía Region) and Colequal Alto in the north; the fourth locality is Mehuín, which is the type locality. The altitudinal range is 50–486 m (164–1,594 ft) asl.

== Description ==
Adult males measure 41–56 mm (1.6–2.2 in) and females 35–53 mm (1.4–2.1 in) in snout–vent length. The body is sturdy with muscular arms and legs (these frogs are powerful jumpers). The toes are partially webbed and thinner than the fingers which are short, thick, and unwebbed. The head is wider than long, with a broad, rounded snout. The eyes are large, and tympanum is visible but not large. The back is reddish brown with some whitish granulations. The hind legs have transverse, darker bands. The throat is pinkish yellow, and the stomach is pale. Skin is dorsally quite granular or warty. Also ventral region is also very granular, apart from the throat that is fairly smooth.

The tadpoles can reach 61.00 mm in total length by stage 43. The skin of the dorsum is green-brown in color with some mottling. The tail and fins have light brown spots made of melanophores and guanophores. The skin of the ventrum is clear, with the viscera visible to the naked eye.

== Habitat and conservation ==
Insuetophrynus acarpicus inhabits coastal streams in temperate forest. They spend a great deal of time in the water even though they do not swim well. Adults hide under stones during the day, emerging at night to feed along the stream margins. Tadpoles can be found under stones in muddy areas with slow current.

The species has a small area of distribution (its known range extends only 33 km along the coast) and its habitat is threatened by clear cutting and afforestation.
