= Gulmohar (disambiguation) =

Gulmohar is a common name for the flowering plant Delonix regia.

Gulmohar may also refer to these Indian films:

- Gulmohar (2009 film), a Marathi-language film
- Gulmohar (2023 film), a Hindi-language drama film

== See also ==
- Gul (disambiguation)
- Mohur, a former Indian gold coin
