= Gulnaz =

Gulnaz is a given name, a compound of Naz (name) and Gul (name) is a common Persian and Turkish feminine given name meaning "Shy rose". Notable people with the name include:

- Gulnaz (Afghani)
- Gulnaz Badykova (born 1994), Russian cyclist
