= Amrita Agrahari =

Nepali politician

Amrita Devi Agrahari
- अमृता देवी अग्रहरी

Member of Parliament, Pratinidhi Sabha for Rastriya Janata Party list
- In office 4 March 2018 – 18 sept 2022
- Incumbent
- Assumed office 9 Jan 2023 to present Nepal Communist Party

Personal details
- Born: 18 May 1961 (age 65) Kapilvastu District, Kingdom of Nepal
- Party: PSP-N (2020–present)
- Other party: NSP (before 2009); MJFN (until 2009); MJFN (D) (2009–12); RMSP (2013–17); RJPN (2017–2020)
- Spouse: Kundan Prasad Agrahari
- Children: 2

Amrita Devi Agrahari (Nepali: अमृता देवी अग्रहरी) is a Nepalese politician representing People's Socialist Party, Nepal and current member of the House of Representatives. She was elected from the Indigenous peoples group in the party list from the Rastriya Janata Party Nepal.

== Political career ==
Agrahari was the general secretary of Nepal Sadbhawana Party. She was a member of the Madheshi Janaadhikar Forum, Nepal (Democratic) until its split in 2012. She joined the Rastriya Madhesh Samajbadi Party led by Sharat Singh Bhandari after the split.

She was a member of the Industry, Commerce, Labour and Consumer Welfare Committee of the House of Representatives.
