= Nurgül =

- Gender: Female

Origin
- Language: Turkish
- Meaning: "Radiant rose"

Other names
- Related names: Gülnur, Gul

Nurgül is a feminine Turkish given name. It is a compound of the words "nur" meaning light and "gül" meaning rose in Turkish. Therefore, the name can be interpreted as "light rose" or "radiant rose."

== People ==
=== Given name ===
- Nurgül Yeşilçay (born 1976), Turkish actress
- Nurgyul Salimova (Turkish: Nurgül Salimova, born 2003), Bulgarian chess player

== See also ==
- Gül
- Gülnur
