= Naz (name) =

Naz is a Persian word for "coy", "coquettish", "affectation", "cute." It is a popular feminine given name in Iran, Azerbaijan and Turkey. Naz is also used as a synonym for pride.

== Given name ==
- Naz Albayrak (born 2007), Turkish tennis player
- Naz Arıcı (born 1982), Turkish adult figure skater
- Naz Aydemir (born 1990), Turkish volleyball player
- Naz Bohannon (born 1999), American basketball and former American Football player
- Naz Hillmon (born 2000), American basketball player
- Naz Ikramullah, British-Canadian artist
- Naz Osmanoglu (born 1985), British-Turkish comedian
- Naz Reid (born 1999), American basketball player
- Naz Shah (born 1973), British politician
- Naz Shahrokh (born 1969), Iranian-born visual artist

=== Middle name ===
- Anila Naz Chowdhury (born 1975), Bangladeshi singer
- Ayça Naz İhtiyaroğlu (born 1984), Turkish volleyball player
- Ela Naz Özdemir (born 2006), Turkish swimmer
- İdil Naz Başcan (born 1999), Turkish volleyball player

== Surname ==
- Rasheed Naz (1948–2022), Pakistani film and television actor

== Nickname ==
- Naseem Hamed (born 1974), British boxer
- Nazem Kadri, professional ice hockey player

== See also ==
- Gulnaz
- Nazgul (disambiguation)
- Naaz
