= Gulnur =

- Gender: Female

Origin
- Language: Turkic
- Meaning: "Rose radiant"

Other names
- Related names: Nurgül, Gul

Gulnur or Gülnur (gül (flowers) + nur (shine)), is a female given name of Turkic origin. Notable people with the name include:

- Gülnur Muradoğlu (born 1961), British professor of finance
- Gülnur Tumbat (born 1975), Turkish academic and mountaineer
- Gülnur Yerlisu (born 1969), Turkish taekwondo practitioner

== See also ==
- Gül
- Nurgül
