= Gull (surname) =

Gull is an uncommon surname. Spelling variations of this family name include: Gull, Gul, Guil, Guile, Guille, etc.

- Arthur Gull (1867–1951), Australian politician
- Cameron Gull (1860–1922), Liberal Unionist politician from England
- Ilyas Gull (born 1968), Pakistani-born Hong Kong cricketer
- Gustav Gull (1858–1942), Swiss architect
- Jim Gull (1928–2007), Australian rules footballer
- Keith Gull (born 1948), microbiologist
- Mandy Gull-Masty, Canadian politician in Québec
- Robert Gull (born 1991), Swedish motorcycle racer
- Stephen Gull, British physicist
- Stewart Gull (footballer), Australian rules footballer
- Thomas Gull (1832–1878), Australian politician
- Sir William Gull, 1st Baronet, a prominent 19th century English physician

== See also ==
- Meirchion Gul, 5th-century king of Rheged, whose epithet means the Lean
- Gull (disambiguation)
- Gul (name)
