= Gulzhan =

Gulzhan (Gül (flower's) + zhan (soul)) may refer to:

- Gulzhan Issanova (born 1983), Kazakhstani judoka
- Gulzhan Karagusova, Kazakhstani politician, Minister of Labor and Social Protection in the government of Kazakhstan since 2001
- Guljan (site), former Kazakh news website
