= Gull Island =

Gull Island may refer to:

== Australia ==
- Gull Island (Tasmania)

== Canada ==
- Gull Island, Labrador
- Gull Island, Nunavut
- Gull Island, Newfoundland
- Gull Island (Lake Kagawong), Ontario
- Gull Island (Niagara River), Ontario
- Mohawk Island, Lake Erie, Ontario, formerly known as Gull Island
- Gull Island (Lake Ontario), off the Presqu'ile tombolo on the north shore of Lake Ontario
- Gull Island, an island in the Witless Bay Ecological Reserve, Newfoundland

== United Kingdom ==
- Gull Island (Hampshire)

== United States ==
- Gull Island (Prudhoe Bay), Alaska
- Gull Island (Massachusetts), one of the Elizabeth Islands
  - Gull Island Bomb Area
- Gull Island (Michigan), the name of a number of islands
- Gull Island (Wisconsin), one of the Apostle Islands of Lake Superior
- Gull Island Shoal (Lake Erie), Ohio
- Little Gull Island and Great Gull Island, New York
- The former name of Ellis Island, New York and New Jersey
- Sutil Island, near Santa Barbara Islands in the Channel Islands, California; formerly known as Gull Island
- A small island in the Channel Islands National Marine Sanctuary, near Santa Cruz Island, California

== See also ==
- Gull Island vole
- Isle of May, Firth of Forth, Scotland, whose name may derive from "Gull Island"
