= Nazz (disambiguation) =

Nazz was an American rock band.

(The) Nazz may also refer to:

- Nazz (album), the band's 1968 debut
- Nazz, character from the cartoon Ed, Edd n Eddy
- "The Nazz", a 1952 comedy routine by Lord Buckley
