= San Diego Gulls (disambiguation) =

San Diego Gulls most commonly refers to:

- San Diego Gulls, a minor league professional team in the American Hockey League that began play in the 2015–16 season.

San Diego Gulls may also refer to former ice hockey teams based in San Diego, California:

- San Diego Gulls (1966–1974), a minor professional team in the Western Hockey League
- San Diego Gulls (1990–1995), a minor professional team in the International Hockey League
- San Diego Gulls (1995–2006), a minor professional team in the West Coast Hockey League, and later the ECHL
- San Diego Gulls (2008–2015), a junior team founded as the San Diego Surf in 2001 and continuing as the San Diego Sabers since 2015
