= Shabnum Gul =

Fiction writer (born 1963)

- Born: Razia Sultana; July 5, 1963 (age 63); Dadu, Sindh, Pakistani
- Occupation: Writer
- Writing career
- Genres: Fiction, Poetry
- Subjects: Literature, mysticism, psychology

Shabnum Gul (Sindhi: شبنم گل; born on July 5, 1963, in Dadu in District Larkana), is a writer who contributed 15 books on diverse subjects along with several research papers. Shabnum Gul rendered services in the field of education and served various colleges of the Hyderabad region. At present, she is working as an Associate Professor and head of the English department in government, Shah Latif College, Latifabad. She has served as a Secretary at Sindhi language Authority.

== Early life ==
Shabnum Gul was born on 5 July 1963 in Dadu in District Larkana, Sindh. Her family name is Razia Sultana but she is known by her pen name, Shabnum Gul. Her father, Dr. Bashir Ahmed Lashari, was a medical officer posted to different places in Sindh.

Shabnum Gul is an author and scholar who has contributed many works in literature. Her field of interests are psychology, parapsychology, mysticism, social issues etc.. She has worked in different genres such as: short stories, poetry, columns, essays, travelogue, radio and television plays and novels. Her works are comparative studies of Shah Abdul Latif Bhittai and the western poets.

Shabnum Gul contributed 15 books on diverse subjects along with several Research papers on the different subjects. She started writing short stories and columns from a very young age and started her career as a freelance journalist and her columns, features, articles and critique were published in Sindhi, Urdu and English newspapers.

She is also radio, stage and television compare and conducted various literary stage programs till the present. Shabnum Gul rendered valuable services in the field of education and served various colleges of Hyderabad region. She is working at present as an Associated professor and head of English department in Government, Shah Latif College, Latifabad. She is current Secretary of Sindhi language Authority.

She is married to well-known historian, archeologist and author Ishtiaq Ansari and they have two children: Arsum Ishtiaq Ansari and Areen Ishtiaq Ansari.

== Education ==
She received primary and secondary education from Sehwan, Johi and Jamshoro Colony. She did intermediate from Hyderabad Board of intermediate. After that completing graduation from Degree college Thatta. She did Masters in English Literature from English Department, University of Sindh in 1988. She did Masters in Political Science and L.L.B as well.

== Career ==
She joined as lecturer in English in 1991 at Govt. MB & GF Girls College. She served in Government Zubaida Girls College, Government girls degree college, Qasimabad, Govt. Shah Latif Girls College, Latifabad where she served as a head of the English Department for ten years.

She started to work as freelance journalist in Daily Aman Karachi in 1984. She did several interviews of prominent ladies belonged to various professions including art and literature. In 1987/88 she joined Ibrat group of publications.

She is serving as Secretary of Sindhi Language Authority since 2017

== Books ==
Shabnum Gul wrote various books, few of them are:

- Akhri Lafz (آخري لفظ) (poetry) Published by Sugand Publication Larkana. 1994.
- Unjatal shehar jo Naqsho (اڻ ڄاتل شھر جو نقشو) (short stories) Published by New Fields Publication, Hyderabad.
- Muhinjo sooraj mukhi (منھنجو سورج مُکي) (memoirs) Published by Roshani Publication, Kandiaro.
- Makhi Khan Moklani (مکي کان موڪلاڻي) (Novel) Published By My Publication, Sukkur. 2015.
- Khali Hunj jo dukh (خالي ھنج جو ڏُک) (Short Stories) By Popat Publishing House Khairpur 2017.
- Khud Shanasi Jo Johar (خد شناسي جو جوھر) (Articles) By Sindhica Academy Karachi. 2019.
- Dard je Lae (درد جي لاءِ) (Poetry) published By Popat Publishing House Khairpur 2020.
- Piyaasi Lehren (پیاسی لہریں)
- Khuwab Nagar (خواب نگر)
- That-ul-Shaoor ki taqat (تحت الشعور کی طاقت)

== See also ==
- Sindhi literature
