= Gular fold =

Anatomical feature of lizards and other reptiles

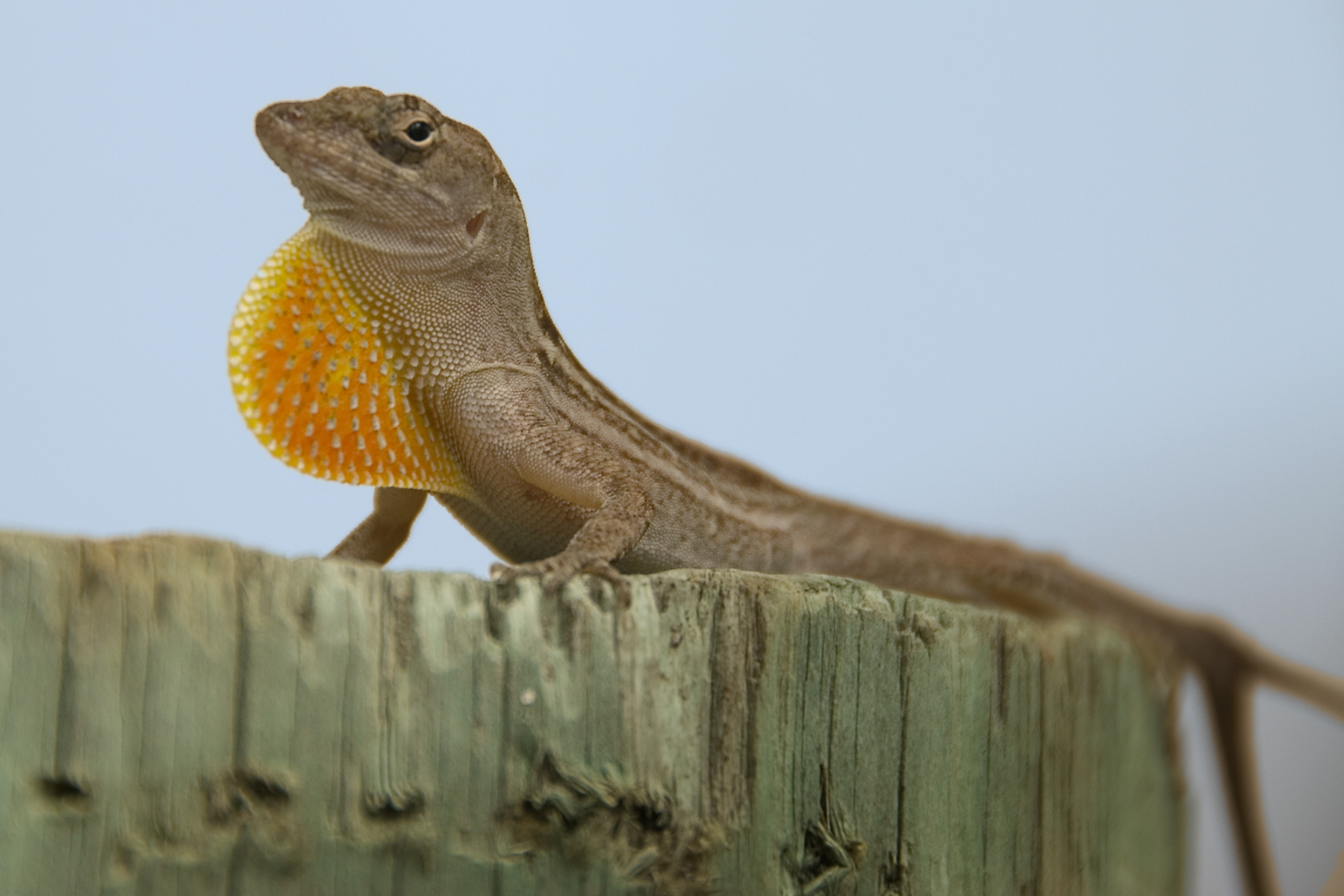
Male anoles have a retractable gular fold, a secondary sexual character, that is also employed to dissuade rivals.

A gular fold is a feature of the body of lizards and many other reptiles. It is a granular fold found on the ventral throat, located immediately in front of the forelegs.

== See also ==
- Gular (disambiguation), gular anatomical formations in other species
