= Chile Darwin's frog =

Conservation status
- Critically endangered, possibly extinct (IUCN 3.1)

Scientific classification
- Kingdom: Animalia
- Phylum: Chordata
- Class: Amphibia
- Order: Anura
- Family: Rhinodermatidae
- Genus: Rhinoderma
- Species: R. rufum

Binomial name
- Rhinoderma rufum (Philippi, 1902)
- Range of Rhinoderma rufum (in red)

Synonyms
- Heminectes rufus Philippi, 1902

Species of amphibian

The Chile Darwin's frog (Rhinoderma rufum), also called the northern Darwin's frog, is a possibly extinct frog, and one of only three members of the family Rhinodermatidae. It is endemic to central Chile.

== Description ==
The Chile Darwin's frog has a snout to vent length of about 32 mm (1.3 in). It has a fleshy proboscis, slender limbs and feet webbed between the first and second, and the second and third toes. The dorsal colour is variable but is usually some shade of brown or green, or a mixture of the two. The ventral surface is mottled in black and white.

== Biology ==
The Chile Darwin's frog is diurnal and feeds on small insects and other invertebrates. The female lays a small clutch of eggs on moist ground. About a week later, when the embryos are beginning to move within the eggs, the male picks them up and stores them in his vocal sac, where they are kept until they have developed a functioning gut and keratinized jaws. The male then transports them to a suitable water body and releases them, where the tadpoles undergo metamorphosis. This development is in contrast to that of the related Darwin's frog (Rhinoderma darwinii) tadpoles, which complete their development in their parent's vocal sac.

== Distribution and habitat ==
The Chile Darwin's frog has a very restricted range in central Chile, being found in Talca Province and southwards to Bío Bío Province, between from 33° 30'S to 37° 50'S. Very little is known about this species, but its natural habitats are probably temperate forests, rivers and swamps. It has been found in wet southern beech forests at altitudes of between 50 and 500 metres (160 and 1,640 ft) above sea level. The species was sympatric with Rhinoderma darwinii in the region surrounding Concepcion, near the southern extremities of the distribution of Rhinoderma rufum.

== Conservation status ==
The Chile Darwin's frog is currently listed as "Critically Endangered or Possibly Extinct" by the IUCN, since there have been no confirmed sightings since around 1981. The main threats it faces are destruction of the pine forests in which it lives and building work but its steep decline is unexplained. It may be the victim of disease such as chytridiomycosis but this had not been reported in Chile when the decline started. If still extant, it is likely to be threatened by habitat loss, pollution, and infection from Batrachochytrium dendrobatidis.

On January 21, 2008, Evolutionarily Distinct and Globally Endangered (EDGE), according to its head, Helen Meredith, identified nature's most weird, wonderful and endangered species: "The EDGE amphibians are amongst the most remarkable and unusual species on the planet and yet an alarming 85% of the top 100 are receiving little or no conservation attention."

== See also ==
- Gastric-brooding frog
- Mouthbrooder
