= Gull Island Shoal (Lake Erie) =

Coordinates: 41°39′35.14″N 82°41′14.38″W

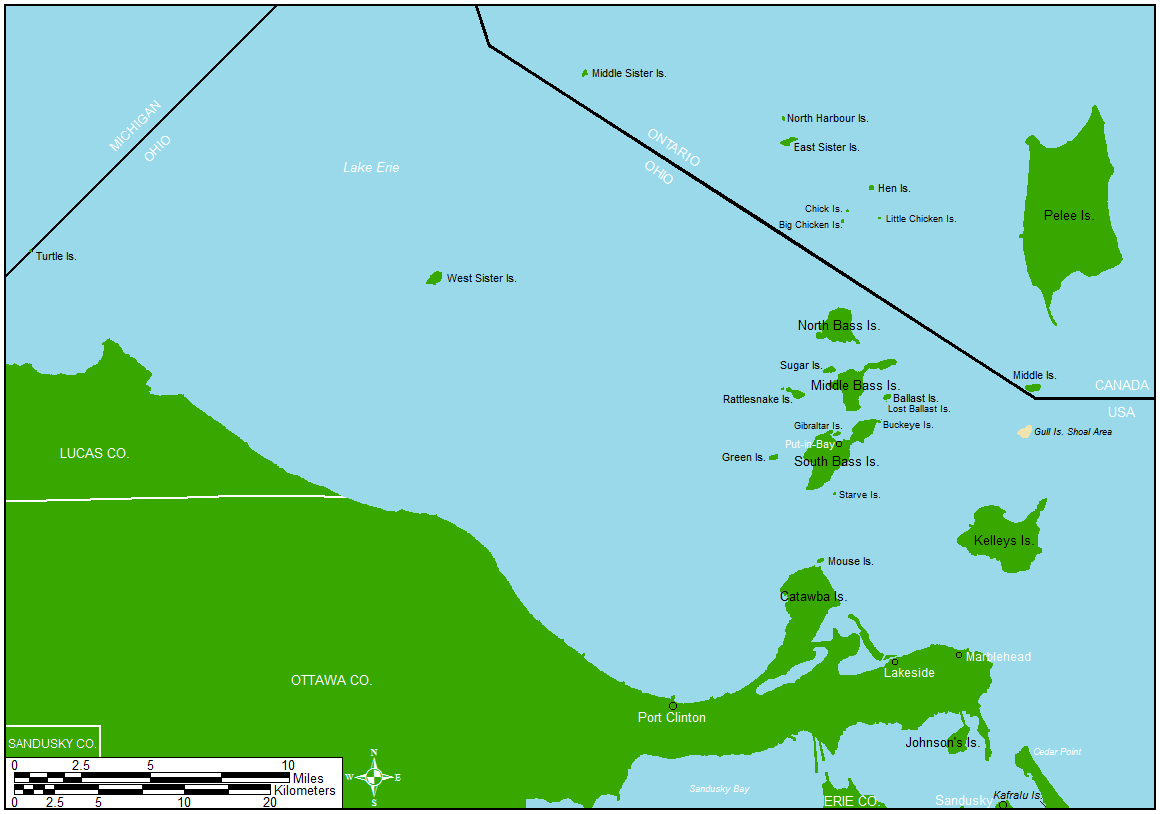
Gull Island Shoal is located between Middle Island and Kelleys Island.

Gull Island Shoal is a former island of the U.S. state of Ohio, located in Lake Erie. Although it still appears on some old maps of Lake Erie as "Gull Island", it is no longer an island, but rather is now just a shoal south of Middle Island. The island was last seen above water 120 years ago.
