= Gular =

Gular may refer to:

== Pertaining to the throat ==
- Gular scales in reptiles
- Gular scute, or gular projection, in turtles and tortoises
- Gular fold in lizards
- Gular skin, or gular sac, in birds and some gibbons

== Other uses ==
- Gular, another name of the village of Guglar in the Zanjan Province, Iran
- Gular (Azerbaijani: Gülər /jy'lær/ – "smiling one"), an Azerbaijani female name
  - Gular Ahmadova, a jailed Azerbaijani politician
- Colloquial name for Ficus racemosa fruit in India

== See also ==
- Gul (disambiguation)
