= Gul Rahman Qazi =

Afghan scholar, peace activist, politician

Professor Gul Rahman Qazi is a Pashtun Afghan scholar, peace activist and politician.

On 6 October 2010, he became the Head of the Public Law Department at Kabul University and in 2011, became the Head of the Supervisory Commission Legal Section on the Implementation of the Constitution.
