= Ruhi Naze =

Nepali politician

Ruhi Naze Mikrani
- रुही नाज मिकरानी

Member of Parliament, Pratinidhi Sabha for Federal Socialist Forum party list
- Incumbent
- Assumed office 4 March 2018

Personal details
- Born: 1971 (age 54–55)
- Party: People's Socialist Party
- Other party: MJF-N; Federal Socialist Forum

Ruhi Naze Mikrani (Nepali: रुही नाज मिकरानी) is a Nepali politician and a member of the House of Representatives of the federal parliament of Nepal. She was elected under the proportional representation system from Federal Socialist Forum, Nepal. Later she joined CPN (Unified Marxist-Leninst) before the 2022 general election.
