= Gull Island, Nunavut =

Island in Nunavut, Canada

Gull Island
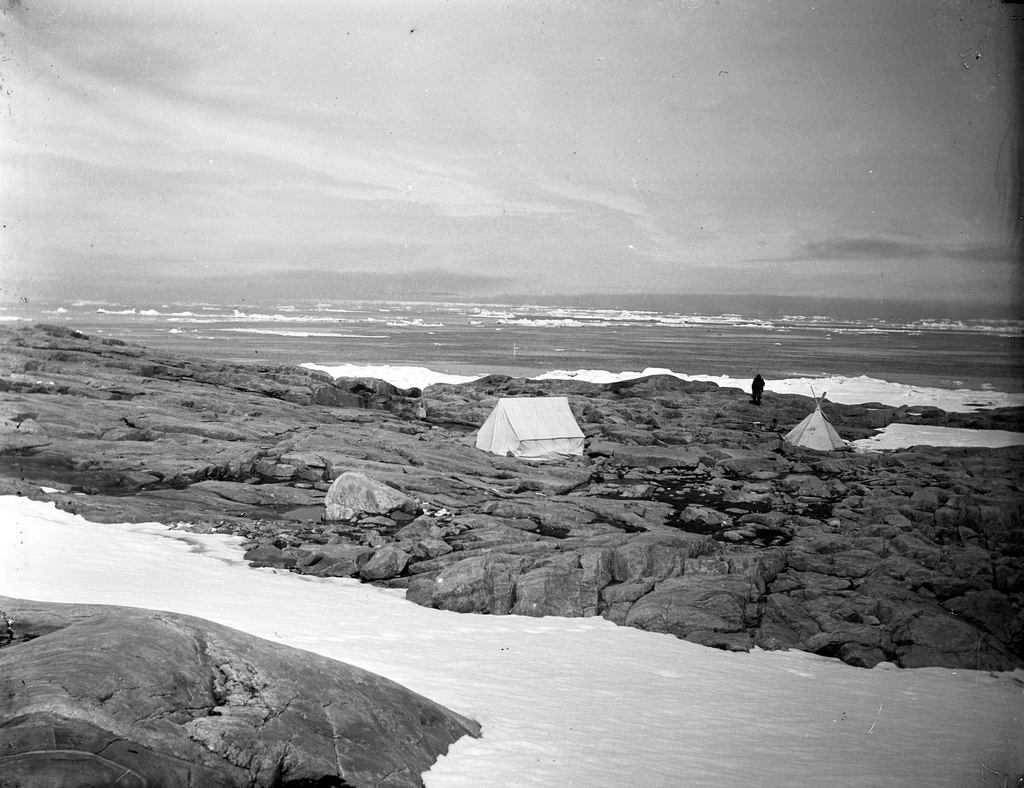
- Camp on Gull island

- Location within Nunavut Location within Canada

Geography
- Location: James Bay
- Coordinates: 52°19′N 79°02′W
- Archipelago: Arctic Archipelago

Administration
- Canada
- Nunavut: Nunavut
- Region: Qikiqtaaluk

Demographics
- Population: Uninhabited
- Ethnic groups: Cree

Gull Island (Cree language: Kee-Yah-Sh-Koh Mah-Nah-Woo-Na-N) is one of the many uninhabited islands in Qikiqtaaluk Region, Nunavut, Canada. It is a Canadian arctic island located within the midsection of James Bay, south of Vieux Comptoir, Quebec (Old Factory, Quebec).

The island is approximately .5 km (0.31 mi) long and 50 ft (15 m) wide. Though it is small and grassy, it has sufficient vegetation to sustain a large seagull colony.
