= Gulnara =

Gulnara is a given name. Notable people with the name include:

- Gulnara Karimova (born 1972), controversial Uzbek businesswoman, designer, singer and diplomat
- Gulnara Mehmandarova (born 1959), architect, researcher, first President of ICOMOS Azerbaijan
- Gulnara Samitova-Galkina (born 1978), Russian middle-distance runner
- Gulnara Vygovskaya (born 1980), Russian long-distance runner who specializes in marathon races

== See also ==
- Gülnar
