= Naz, Iran =

Naz نز
- Village
- Location within Iran
- Coordinates: 26°32′21″N 57°29′05″E
- Country: Iran
- Province: Hormozgan
- County: Minab
- Bakhsh: Senderk
- Rural District: Dar Pahn

Population (2006)
  - Total: 194
- Time zone: UTC+3:30 (IRST)
  - Summer (DST): UTC+4:30 (IRDT)

Naz (Persian: نز, also Romanized as Nāz) is a village in Dar Pahn Rural District, Senderk District, Minab County, Hormozgan Province, Iran. At the 2006 census, its population was 194, in 50 families.
