= Gul Mohammed Jangvi =

- Citizenship: Afghanistan
- Detained at: Bagram Theater detention facility

Mullah Gul Mohammed Jangvi (also known as Gul Mohammed) is a Taliban field commander.

In an article published on June 9, 2006, the Asia Times described Gul Mohammed Jangvi as a former captive in the Bagram Theater detention facility, who had been denounced and captured in 2003, tortured, and forced to join the Jaish Muslim. The Asia Times describes the Jaish Muslim as a "U.S. proxy".

On July 19, 2006, the Asia Times quoted Jangvi about the Taliban's unexpected withdrawal from hostilities and reported that the Taliban had allowed the Sangeen District of Helmand Province to surrender without much of a fight. They also reported that the Taliban felt that they could allow outrage over Israel's recent bombardment of Lebanon to recruit new supporters to their cause.
