= NRK Gull =

Norwegian digital radio station

Coordinates: 59°56′07″N 10°43′07″E

NRK Gull (lit. 'NRK Gold') was a Norwegian digital radio channel operated by NRK. It broadcast programmes from its archives.

== History ==
Created in 2006 as part of an expansion of NRK's DAB network to include three new networks, broadcasting began in October of that year.

On 4 October 2010, it unveiled a new programming formula, in which the programming was repeated daily over a four-hour block. On Sundays, all of the daily blocks were repeated. On certain occasions, the programming block increased. This happened at Christmas where it lasted twelve hours.

In 2013, NRK planned to develop the service. It was later revealed that the station was replaced by NRK P1+ on 2 October 2013.
