= Gulmira Karimova =

Kazakh politician (1977–2023)

- Гүлмира Кәрімова

Member of the Senate of Kazakhstan
- In office 25 January 2023 – 27 January 2023

Personal details
- Born: Gulmira Rainbekovna Karimova; 13 August 1977 Petropavl, Kazakh SSR, Soviet Union
- Died: 27 January 2023 (aged 45) Astana, Kazakhstan
- Party: Independent
- Education: North Kazakhstan State University; Kokshetau State University; Omsk State Technical University
- Profession: Schoolteacher

Gülmira Raiynbekqyzy Kärımova (Kazakh: Гүлмира Райынбекқызы Кәрімова; 13 August 1977 – 27 January 2023) was a Kazakh schoolteacher and politician. An independent, she served in the Senate from 25 to 27 January 2023. Before that, she was Chairman of the Committee of preschool and secondary education of the Ministry of Education and Science from 2021 to 2023.

Karimova died suddenly in Astana on 27 January 2023, at the age of 45, only 2 days into her term as Senator.

== Career ==
Karimova was born on August 13, 1977, in Petropavlovsk.

She graduated in 1998 from the North Kazakhstan State University majoring in "Teacher of primary classes". In 2008, she finished Kokshetau University majoring in "Bachelor of Finance" and in 2016, got her master's degree in "Pedagogical Education" at Omsk State Pedagogical University.

From 1998 to 2017, she served in various teaching and executive jobs at different schools of Petropavl.

From July 2017 to September 2021, Karimova was Head of the Department of Education of the North Kazakhstan region.

From September 2021 to 16 January 2023, she was Chairman of the Committee of preschool and secondary education of the Ministry of Education and Science of the Republic of Kazakhstan.

On January 14, 2023, Gulmira Karimova was elected as a member of the Senate from the North Kazakhstan region. On January 25, the Central Election Commission of Kazakhstan registered Karimova as an elected member of the Senate. She died on January 26, 2023, in Astana.
