= Gol Mir, Hirmand =

Gol Mir گل مير
- Village
- Location within Iran
- Coordinates: 31°10′40″N 61°41′46″E
- Country: Iran
- Province: Sistan and Baluchestan
- County: Hirmand
- Bakhsh: Central
- Rural District: Margan

Population (2006)
  - Total: 36
- Time zone: UTC+3:30 (IRST)
  - Summer (DST): UTC+4:30 (IRDT)

Gol Mir (Persian: گل مير, also Romanized as Gol Mīr; also known as Deh-e Gol Mīr and Gol-e Mīr Karam) is a village in Margan Rural District, in the Central District of Hirmand County, Sistan and Baluchestan Province, Iran. At the 2006 census, its population was 36, in 8 families.
