= Deh-e Gol Mir =

Deh-e Gol Mir ده گل مير
- Village
- Location within Iran
- Coordinates: 31°04′29″N 61°48′47″E
- Country: Iran
- Province: Sistan and Baluchestan
- County: Hirmand
- Bakhsh: Central
- Rural District: Dust Mohammad

Population (2006)
  - Total: 128
- Time zone: UTC+3:30 (IRST)
  - Summer (DST): UTC+4:30 (IRDT)

Deh-e Gol Mir (Persian: ده گل مير, also Romanized as Deh-e Gol Mīr; also known as Golmīr) is a village in Dust Mohammad Rural District, in the Central District of Hirmand County, Sistan and Baluchestan Province, Iran. At the 2006 census, its population was 128, in 27 families.
