= Gulnaz (Afghan) =

Gulnaz is an Afghan woman who was raped by her cousin's husband in 2009. Gulnaz delayed coming forward to avoid social stigma and family conflict, until she experienced early signs of pregnancy. When she did report the rape, she was charged with zina (moral crimes) and sentenced to twelve years in prison. International awareness of her case highlighted the plight of many Afghan women serving similar sentences, and sparked criticism over Afghanistan's post-Taliban human rights record.

== International attention ==
Gulnaz's story was included in a European documentary about Afghan women jailed for zina (moral crimes). However, the European Union blocked the release of the documentary because of concerns for the safety of the women portrayed in the film. Human rights activists wanted to expose injustices meted out to Afghan women, in the name of moral crimes, by the Afghan judicial system. Amnesty International wanted the release of documentary to bring to light one of Afghanistan's most shameful judicial practices.

American lawyer Kimberley Motley represented her and successfully submitted a pardon application to President Hamid Karzai. More than five thousand people also signed a petition for Gulnaz's release. On December 2, 2011 President Karzai signed her pardon.

Despite President Karzai's pardon, government officials pressured her to marry her rapist. She agreed to marry her attacker to secure her freedom and legitimize her daughter, who had been born in jail.

== Accountability for her plight ==
Gulnaz's case not only attracted international attention, but also raised questions about governance in Afghanistan. Speaking to the BBC correspondent Caroline Wyatt, Gulnaz said, "I don't want to have anything to do with Afghanistan government again, because they put innocent people in prison. What kind of government is this? What kind of Afghanistan is this? My attacker committed a crime, and they arrested me!"

== Her future ==
Speaking to BBC correspondent Caroline Wyatt, a local said, "If she went home, her brothers would kill her because of the shame she brought on her family." However, she is willing to marry the rapist to preserve her family's honour. She said, "I'll marry him, if his family finds a wife for my brother and pays dowry to me. There is no other way, if the families can't agree each other, they will become enemies."

Speaking to CNN's correspondent Fareed Zakaria, President Hamid Karzai said her case appeared to be a "misjudgment" which he had resolved by pardoning her. He further added, it's her choice who she marries or who she doesn't marry. He claimed Islam gives her that right.

Karzai also promised the West that he would prevent any miscarriage of justice after the withdrawal of the international forces. His aim was to make the Judiciary distinguish between rape and adultery.

Kimberly Motley, Gulnaz's lawyer, said Afghanistan treats women as second-class citizens. Women are often mistreated by Afghanistan's judicial system, as illustrated with Gulnaz's case. Gulnaz's conservative family cut off ties with her and her child, Masqa, after she married her rapist who was also released from prison.

In 2015, after receiving the president's pardon, government officials forced her to marry her rapist. The latter claims to have rescued her from shame by marrying her.

According to a report by CNN in 2015, she is now, "pregnant with the third child of the man who was once her rapist, accepting a life as his second wife, trapped in his home."

== Criticism ==
According to Heather Barr from Human Rights Watch, who is carrying out research among Afghan female prisoners said that many of the women prisoners were victims of abuse by husbands, relatives and also by those who are supposed to protect them, namely state apparatus including the police and judiciary.

According to Vygaudas Usackas, the EU's Ambassador and Special Representative to Afghanistan, in spite of it having been ten years since the overthrow of the Taliban regime, Afghan women continue "to suffer in unimaginable conditions, deprived of even the most basic human rights".

Bilal Sarwary, from BBC in Kabul, says the recent cases of violence against women in the Afghan region are embarrassing for the government. Afghan women's rights activists are also demanding an end to the culture of impunity.

Muslim women critics are highlighting the negligence of Afghan officials in prosecuting rape cases and beatings suffered by women, in spite of new laws being brought in. They say that indictments were filed on just 155 occasions out of 2,299 incidents of violence against women. They also allege that the reforms and laws brought in to eliminate violence against women are not enforced.

When the CNN correspondent spoke to a spokesman of the prosecutor to comment on the case he replied that "there are hundreds of such cases pending".
