= Songül =

Songül is a Turkish given name for females. "Son+gül" literally means "last rose". It is usually given to the last daughter in a family which expects no more children. In 2014 the general directorate of civil registration and citizenship affairs of Turkey reported that Songül was among 50 most popular female names. In 2021 the newspaper Hürriyet wrote that about 180,000 bear the name.

Notable people with the given name include:

- Songül Dikmen (born 1981), Turkish volleyball player
- Songül Lök (born 2002), Turkish archer
- Songül Mutluer (born 1979), Dutch politician
- Songül Öden (born 1979), Turkish stage and television actress
- Fatma Songül Gültekin (born 1997), Turkish hockey player and former footballer
