= USS Gull =

USS Gull is a name used more than once by the U.S. Navy:

- USS Gull (AM-74), was a fleet minesweeper commissioned 3 December 1940
- USS Gull (AMS-16), was a minesweeper commissioned 28 February 1944
- Gull (AM-399), was to be built by the Defoe Shipbuilding Company in Bay City, Michigan, but the construction contract was canceled by the US Navy on 16 May 1945
