= Federalism in Nepal =

National political system since 2008

Nepal is a country with geographical diversity, which had been practicing a unitary form of government since its unification by Prithvi Narayan Shah. However, this system was not able to achieve the development goals of the country and had been described as an "exclusive form of rule" by its critics. Federalism has been seen as the answer to solving regional inequality and reducing economic, social, and religious discrimination; the country has transformed into a federal structure as a result.

Nepal has been a federal democratic republican state since 28 May 2008 (15th Jestha, 2065 BS). According to the concept of a federal system, Nepal has been divided into 7 provinces, 77 districts and 753 local levels. Now each province has a separate government along with the federal government at the centre.

== History ==
In the aftermath of the 2007 People's Revolt II, the 240-year monarchy was abolished in the 5th amendment of the Interim Constitution of Nepal, 2063. The amendment was the first document to mention Nepal officially as the Federal Democratic Republic of Nepal. It envisioned federalism as a prominent feature for a new Nepal.

The Maoist party was the catalyst for bringing forth federalism and inclusion. Other major parties that supported the move include the Communist Party of Nepal (Unified Marxist–Leninist) and the Nepali Congress, whereas the Rastriya Prajatantra Party, which was only able to enter the parliament under the Proportional Representation scheme, has come out in opposition to the prospect of federalism, as well as in favour of bringing back the monarchy and declaring Nepal as a Hindu nation.

Nepal had been practicing a unitary form of government under the Shah rulers (Prithivi Narayan Shah). However this system was unable to support development of the country and was seen as an "exclusive" form of rule.

== Legislative power ==
The power of the provinces and the federal government are defined by the constitution.

== See also ==
- Provinces of Nepal
- Federal Government of Nepal
