= Aygül =

- Gender: Feminine
- Language: Turkish; Turkmen

Origin
- Language: Turkic

Other names
- Related names: Aigul

Aygül or Aygul is a feminine Turkish and Turkmen given name and a surname. It is composed of two Turkish words: “Ay” meaning "moon" and “Gül” meaning "rose." Together, it can be interpreted as "moon rose" or "rose of the moon."

== Given name ==
- Aygül Berivan Aslan (born 1981), Kurdish-Austrian politician
- Aygul Idrisova (born 1995), Russian draughts player
- Aygül Özkan (born 1971), German politician

== See also ==
- Aigul
