= Gülnur Muradoğlu =

- Born: March 2, 1961 (age 65); Turkey
- Occupation: Academic
- Known for: Professor of behavioural finance

Gülnur Muradoğlu (born March 2, 1961), is a Turkish, naturalised British professor of behavioural finance at Queen Mary University of London. Previously, she was the director of Ph.D. programmes at Cass Business School (City University London).

Muradoğlu has also worked for Manchester School of Accounting and Finance as the Director of the MSc. Finance Program, and for Bilkent University as assistant and associate professor respectively. She has been at the Wharton School of the University of Pennsylvania as a Fulbrighter and Warwick Business School as a visiting fellow.

Muradoğlu has published more than thirty articles in various journals including Journal of Behavioural Finance, Journal of Economics and Business, International Journal of Business, European Journal of Finance, Multinational Finance Journal, Applied Financial Economics, Developing Economies, European Journal of Operational Research, Journal of Forecasting, International Journal of Forecasting, and Applied Economics Letters.
