= Gülnar (disambiguation) =

Gülnar is a district of the Mersin Province in Turkey.

Gülnar or Gulnar may also refer to:

- Gülnar Hatun (731–769), Turkish female hero
- Gülnar Haýytbaýewa, Turkmenistani judoka in the 2012 Summer Olympics

== See also ==
- Gulnara
