= Gull Lake =

Gull Lake may refer to:

== Native American entities ==
- Gull Lake Indian Reservation, located near Brainerd, Minnesota, surrounding Gull Lake
- Gull Lake Band of Mississippi Chippewa, whose descendants are located on the White Earth Indian Reservation

== Lakes ==
=== Canada ===
- Gull Lake (Ontario)
- Gull Lake (Alberta)
- Gull Lake (Newfoundland)
- Gull Lake (Nova Scotia)
- Goéland Lake, Québec (English: Gull Lake)

=== United States ===
- Gull Lake (Michigan)
- Gull Lake (Cass County, Minnesota)
- Gull Lake (McKeever, Herkimer County, New York)

=== South Georgia and the South Sandwich Islands (British Overseas Territory) ===
- Gull Lake, South Georgia

== Places ==
- Gull Lake, Alberta, a summer village in Alberta, Canada
- Gull Lake, Manitoba, a hamlet in Rural Municipality of Alexander, Manitoba, Canada
- Gull Lake, Saskatchewan, a town in Saskatchewan, Canada
  - Rural Municipality of Gull Lake No. 139, the rural municipality that surrounds the town

== Administrative features ==
- Gull Lake (electoral district), a former electoral district in Saskatchewan, Canada
