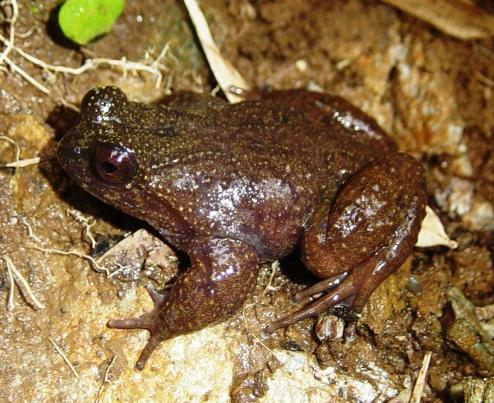
- Insuetophrynus acarpicus

Scientific classification
- Kingdom: Animalia
- Phylum: Chordata
- Class: Amphibia
- Order: Anura
- Superfamily: Hyloidea
- Family: Rhinodermatidae; Bonaparte, 1850

Genera
- Rhinoderma; Insuetophrynus

= Rhinodermatidae =

Family of amphibians

Rhinodermatidae, also known as Darwin's frogs, mouth-breeding frogs or mouth-brooding frogs, is a small family of frogs found in temperate forests of southern Chile and adjacent Argentina.

They are a unique and evolutionary significant group of frogs, being the sister group to all other members of the widespread frog superfamily Hyloidea and having branched from the rest during the Late Cretaceous, just a few million years prior to the Cretaceous-Paleogene extinction event. The two genera, Rhinoderma and Insuetophrynus, are thought to have diverged during the Paleocene. Despite their ancient origins, all three species in the family are now endangered due to habitat destruction, invasive species, and especially the spread of chytridomycosis in their native habitats, and one, the Chile Darwin's frog (Rhinoderma rufum), may already be extinct.

== Genera ==
There are two genera recognised with three species:

- Insuetophrynus Barrio, 1970 (monotypic)
- Rhinoderma Duméril and Bibron, 1841 (2 species)
