= Naaz islands =

Two tidal islands in the Persian gulf, on the shore of Qeshm island

Naaz Islands جزایر ناز
- Island
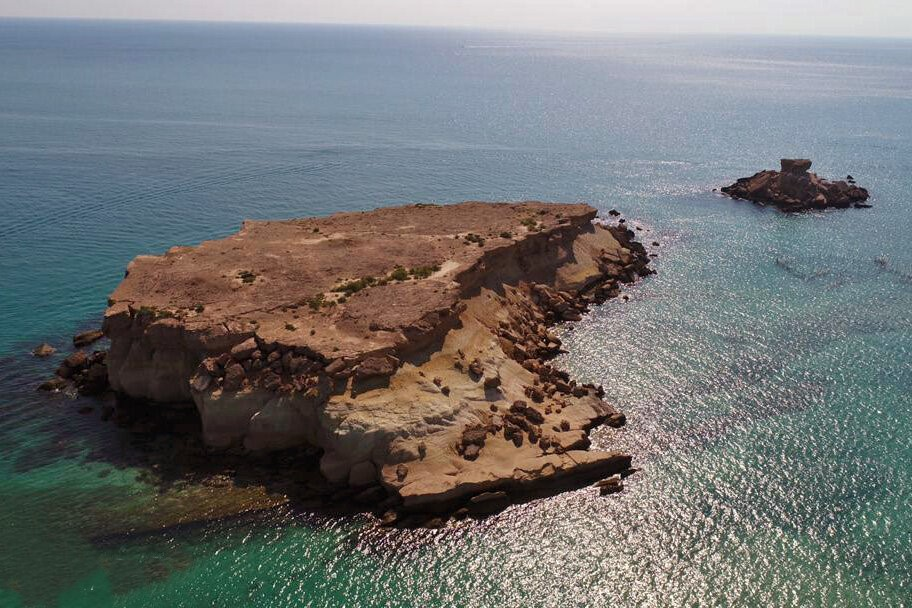
- Naaz Islands
- Interactive map of Naaz Islands
- Coordinates: 26°48′N 56°6′E
- Country: Iran

Area
  - Total: 0.05–0.16 km^{2} (0.019–0.062 sq mi)
- Highest elevation: 6 m (20 ft)

Population
  - Total: 0
- Time zone: UTC+03:30

The Naaz Islands (also spelt Naz Islands, Persian: جزایر ناز) are two tidal islands in the Persian Gulf, on the shore of Qeshm Island.

At low tide, the intertidal zone of Qeshm connects the islands to the shore and at high tide the littoral zone is submerged and two hills become islands. Naaz islands are a tourist attractions of Qeshm Island and the south of Iran.
