= William Gosling =

William Gosling may refer to:

- William Gosling (engineer) (born ca. 1930), British electrical engineer
- William Gosling (VC) (1892–1945), English recipient of the Victoria Cross
- William Gilbert Gosling (1863–1930), Canadian politician, businessman and author
- William Gosling (footballer) (1869–1952), British football player
- William W. Gosling (1824–1883), Victorian landscape painter.
