= Gosling (surname) =

Gosling is an English surname. Notable people with the surname include:

- Armine Nutting Gosling (1861–1942), Newfoundland women's rights activist
- Sir Audley Charles Gosling (1836–1913), British diplomat
- Charles Gosling (1868–1917), British Army officer
- Clint Gosling (born 1960), New Zealand footballer
- Dan Gosling (born 1990), English footballer
- R. Cunliffe Gosling (1868–1922), nineteenth century England football captain
- Harry Gosling (1861–1930), British politician and trade union leader
- Jake Gosling, English producer and songwriter
- Jake Gosling (born 1993), British footballer
- James Gosling (born 1955), Canadian software developer, considered father of Java
- Joanna Gosling (born 1971), British journalist
- John Gosling (disambiguation)
- John Gostling (1644–1733), English singer
- Julia Gosling (born 2001), Canadian ice hockey player
- Katelyn Gosling (born 1993), Canadian ice hockey player
- Lewis Gosling (born 2003), British trampoline gymnast
- Luke Gosling (born 1971), Australian politician
- Mark Gosling (1886–1980), Australian painter and politician
- Mike Gosling (born 1980), United States former Major League Baseball pitcher
- Nicole Gosling (born 2002), Canadian ice hockey player
- Paula Gosling (born 1939), English crime writer
- Ray Gosling (1939–2013), English television presenter, journalist and gay rights activist
- Raymond Gosling (1926–2015), English scientist
- Richard Gosling (born 1974), English strongman
- Ryan Gosling (born 1980), Canadian actor
- Simon Gosling (born 1969), British modeller and propmaker
- William Gosling (1892–1945), English recipient of the Victoria Cross
- William Gosling (born 1932), British electrical engineer
- William Gilbert Gosling (1863–1930), Newfoundland politician, businessman, and author
- William Gosling (footballer) (1869–1952), British footballer
- William W. Gosling (1824–1883), English landscape painter

== See also ==
- Goslinga
