= Gostling =

Gostling is a surname. Notable people with the surname include:

- John Gostling (1644–1733), English singer
- Mildred May Gostling (1873–1962), English chemist
- William Gostling (1696–1777), English clergyman and antiquary
- Brigadier Guy Standish Noakes Gostling (1901 – 1982) , Canadian high ranking army officer during World War II

== See also ==
- Göstling an der Ybbs
- Gosling (disambiguation)
