= Gosling =

Gosling or Goslings may refer to:

- A young goose
- Gosling (surname)

== Places ==
- Gosling Islands, South Orkney Islands, Antarctica

== Music ==
- "The Goslings", song by Frederick Bridge
- The Goslings (band)
- Gosling (band)

== Other ==
- Gosling Brothers, Ltd., a Bermuda rum manufacturer
- Gosling Emacs, Emacs implementation by James Gosling

== See also ==
- Goslings (disambiguation)
- Gosselin (disambiguation), a similar-sounding French surname
