= The Last Day of a Condemned Man =

1829 novella by Victor Hugo

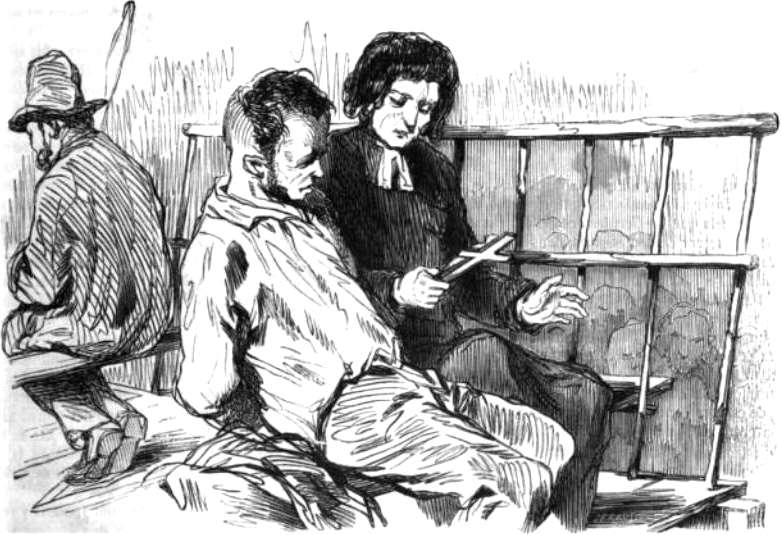
- 1829 illustration from the first edition
- Author: Victor Hugo
- Original title: Le Dernier Jour d'un Condamné
- Language: French
- Genre: Romanticism
- Publisher: Gosselin
- Publication date: 1829
- Publication place: France

The Last Day of a Condemned Man (French: Le Dernier Jour d'un Condamné) is a novella by Victor Hugo first published in 1829. It recounts the thoughts of a man condemned to die. Victor Hugo wrote the novella to express his feelings that the death penalty should be abolished.

== Genesis ==
Victor Hugo witnessed the spectacle of the guillotine several times and was outraged that society coolly gives itself permission to do what it condemns the accused for having done. It was the day after crossing the "Place de l'Hotel de Ville" where an executioner was greasing the guillotine in anticipation of a scheduled execution that Hugo began writing The Last Day of a Condemned Man. He finished very quickly. The book was published in February 1829 by Charles Gosselin without the author's name. Three years later, on 15 March 1832, Hugo completed his story with a long preface and his signature.

== Plot summary ==
A man has been condemned to death by the guillotine in 19th-century France. In Bicêtre, the sentenced man writes down his thoughts, feelings and fears while awaiting his execution. His writing traces his change in psyche vis-a-vis the world outside the prison cell throughout his imprisonment, and describes his life in prison, everything from what his cell looks like to the personality of the prison priest. He does not betray his name or what he has done to the reader, though he vaguely hints that he has killed someone; just a nameless, faceless, irrelevant victim.

The novella also contains a blueprint of Jean Valjean, the hero of Hugo's Les Miserables. As the Condemned is waiting to be executed he meets another condemned man who recounts his life story. The man tells him that he was originally sent to prison for stealing a loaf of bread to save his sister's family. This is the same backstory that Hugo gives for Jean Valjean.

At another point he tries to escape by conning a superstitious guard to give him his clothes. The guard almost does until common sense gets the better of him and he declines exchanging clothes with the Condemned.

On the day that the Condemned is to be executed he sees his three-year-old daughter for the last time, but she no longer recognizes him, and she tells him that her father is dead.

The novel ends just after he briefly but desperately begs for pardon and curses the people of his time, the people he hears outside, screaming impatiently for the spectacle of his decapitation.

== Influence ==
Hugo's text was translated twice into English in 1840. The first translation was published by George William MacArthur Reynolds, author of penny blood novel The Mysteries of London (1844–48), as The Last Day of a Condemned. The second translation in 1840 was completed by Sir P. H. Fleetwood, titled The Last Days of a Condemned. Fleetwood also added his own preface to the book, outlining why it was important that British anti-capital punishment campaigners ought to read it, whereas Reynolds did not add any substantive new material but reprinted Hugo's preface and provided a few footnotes which he signed as 'Trans.'

Though The Last Day of a Condemned Man is lesser known than some of Hugo's other works, the novel had the distinction of being praised as "absolutely the most real and truthful of everything that Hugo wrote” by Fyodor Dostoevsky, who referenced it in both his letters and his novel, The Idiot. Notably, Dostoyevsky had suffered the psychological insight of himself being condemned to death and suffered a mock execution after reprieved. Furthermore, Dostoevsky pays tribute to the novel in the format of The Meek One, citing Hugo's novel as a means of justifying the "fantastic" idea of writing down a person's thoughts at a moment of distress.

Hugo's novel has been made into an opera with music by David Alagna, libretto by David, Roberto, and Frederico Alagna, and starring Roberto Alagna and Adina Aaron
