= Goslings =

Goslings may refer to:

- Goslings Bank, a historical British banking firm, now Barclays Fleet Street branch
- Gosling's Ginger Beer, a brand name for Ginger Beer
- Gosling's Rum, a Bermuda-based brand name
- The Goslings, a drone rock band

== See also ==
- Gosling (disambiguation)
