= Dimoline =

Dimoline is a surname. Notable people with the surname include:

- Harry Kenneth Dimoline (1903–1972), British artillery officer
- William Alfred Dimoline (1897–1965), British army officer
