= Cyril Edward Gourley =

English Victoria Cross recipient (1893–1982)

- Born: 19 January 1893; Wavertree, Liverpool, England
- Died: 31 January 1982 (aged 89); Haslemere, Surrey, England
- Burial place: Grange Cemetery, West Kirby, Merseyside, England
- Military career
- Allegiance: United Kingdom
- Branch: British Army
- Service years: 1914–1919
- Rank: Captain
- Units: Royal Field Artillery
- Conflicts: World War I
- Awards: Victoria Cross; Military Medal; Croix de guerre (France)

Captain Cyril Edward Gourley VC MM (19 January 1893 – 31 January 1982) was a British Army officer and an English recipient of the Victoria Cross (VC), the highest and most prestigious award for gallantry in the face of the enemy that can be awarded to British and Commonwealth forces.

== Early life ==
Cyril Edward Gourley was born in Wavertree, Liverpool and educated at Calday Grange Grammar School and Liverpool University, graduating in 1913.

== First World War service ==
Gourley had joined 7th Lancashire Battery of the IV West Lancashire (Howitzer) Brigade, Royal Field Artillery (Territorial Force) in May 1914. He was mobilised with his unit on the outbreak of war in August 1914 and went with it to the Western Front in September 1915. His battery was transferred to CCLXXVI (276) Brigade in 1916. In September 1917, he was serving near Ypres and was awarded the Military Medal for conspicuous gallantry in putting out a fire near an ammunition dump.

=== Victoria Cross ===
Gourley was 24 years old, and a sergeant in D (Howitzer) Battery of 276th (West Lancashire) Brigade, RFA, when the following deed took place for which he was awarded the VC. (Note: Sergeant Gourley is reputed to be the only Territorial gunner ever to win the VC; in fact, Sergeant William Gosling of the III Wessex Brigade, RFA, TF, was also awarded the VC while serving in a trench mortar battery.)

On 30 November 1917 at Little Priel Farm, east of Epehy, France, during the Battle of Cambrai, Sergeant Gourley was in command of a section of howitzers of the 55th (West Lancashire) Division. During an enemy advance, when their forces were within a few hundred yards of him, both to the front and on one flank, and though plagued by snipers, Sergeant Gourley managed to keep one gun firing. At one point he pulled the gun out of the pit and engaged a machine-gun at 500 yards, knocking it out with a direct hit. All day he held the Germans in check, firing over open sights on enemy parties, thereby saving his guns, which were withdrawn at nightfall.

The citation for his VC reads:

No. 681886 Sjt. Cyril Edward Gourley, M.M., R.F.A. (West Kirby).

For most conspicuous bravery when in command of a section of howitzers. Though the enemy advanced in force getting within 400 yards in front, between 300 and 400 yards to one flank and with snipers in the rear, Sjt. Gourley managed to keep one gun in action practically throughout the day. Though frequently driven off he always returned, carrying ammunition, laying and firing the gun himself, taking first one and then another of the detachment to assist him. When the enemy advanced he pulled his gun out of the pit, and engaged a machine gun at 500 yards, knocking it out with a direct hit. All day he held the enemy in check, firing with open sights at enemy parties in full view at 300 to 800 yards, and thereby saved his guns, which were withdrawn at nightfall. He had previously been awarded the Military Medal for conspicuous gallantry.

— London Gazette, 13 February 1918

Gourley was originally denied an officer's commission due to "defective eyesight", but, after being made a second lieutenant in the RFA, later rose to the rank of captain.

== Post-war ==
From 1919, Gourley worked for Lever Brothers, travelling widely to open up new business for the company. On his retirement a director of the company spoke of "...his quiet, gentle courteousness and his readiness to do all he could for other people. In fact he was a jolly good man to have beside you when you were in trouble". In 1925, the Gourley family moved to Hill Close, School Lane, off Column Road, Grange, West Kirby; the house was later renamed Gourley Grange and the lane renamed Gourley's Lane in his honour. The gardens created by the Gourley family have now been redeveloped as a small housing estate.

During the Second World War, Gourley was a firewatcher in Liverpool, and dealt with many of the air raids on Liverpool.

In 1952, Gourley, "a modest, kindly and courteous gentleman", moved to Haslemere, Surrey, where he died on 31 January 1982, at the age of eighty-nine. He is buried in Grange Cemetery, West Kirby, Wirral. Gourley never married.

The Trustees of The Cyril Edward Gourley Victoria Cross Endowment, Registered Charity 525987, set up in his honour after the First World War from local donations, provide grants to University Students who attended schools, or reside in the Hoylake and West Kirby area, subject to certain conditions.

== The medal ==
His VC, along with his other medals which include the Croix de Guerre, is held by the Royal Artillery Museum.

== Bibliography ==
- The Register of the Victoria Cross. This England. 1997. ISBN 0-906324-03-3.

== Bibliography ==
- Gliddon, Gerald (2004) [2012]. VCs of the First World War: Cambrai 1917. The History Press. ISBN 978-0-75-247668-1.
- Harvey, David (2000). Monuments to Courage. Naval & Military Press Ltd. ISBN 1-84342-356-1.
- Murphy, James (2008). Liverpool VCs. Pen and Sword Books. ISBN 978-1844157808.
- Anon, History of the 359 (4th West Lancs.) Medium Regiment R.A. (T.A.) 1859–1959, Liverpool: 359 Medium Regiment, 1959.
- Rev J. O. Coop, The Story of the 55th (West Lancashire) Division, Liverpool: Daily Post Printers, 1919/Uckfield: Naval & Military Press, 2002, ISBN 978-1843422631.
- Gen Sir Martin Farndale, History of the Royal Regiment of Artillery: Western Front 1914–18, Woolwich: Royal Artillery Institution, 1986, ISBN 1-870114-00-0.
- Norman E. H. Litchfield, The Territorial Artillery 1908–1988 (Their Lineage, Uniforms and Badges), Nottingham: Sherwood Press, 1992, ISBN 0-9508205-2-0.
