= Gosselin (disambiguation) =

Gosselin is a surname.

Gosselin may refer to:

- USS Gosselin (APD-126), a US Navy high-speed transport ship named after Edward W. Gosselin
- Gosselin sextuplets, issue from Jon and Kate
- Gosselin v. Quebec (Attorney General), a Supreme Court of Canada case

== Rivers ==
- Gosselin River (Fortier River tributary), in Mauricie, Quebec, Canada
- Gosselin River (Nicolet River tributary), a river in Quebec, Canada

== Other uses ==
- Mario Gosselin (disambiguation)

== See also ==
- Gosling (disambiguation), a similar-sounding English surname
