= Goslinga =

Goslinga is a surname. Notable people with the surname include:

- Rose Goslinga, South African microinsurer and advocate
- Sicco van Goslinga (1664–1731), Dutch nobleman and politician

== See also ==
- Gosling (surname)
