= 4th Lancashire Artillery Volunteers =

British Army military unit

4th Lancashire Artillery Volunteers 4th West Lancashire Brigade, RFA 59th Medium Regiment, RA 359 Medium Regiment, RA West Lancashire Regiment, RA
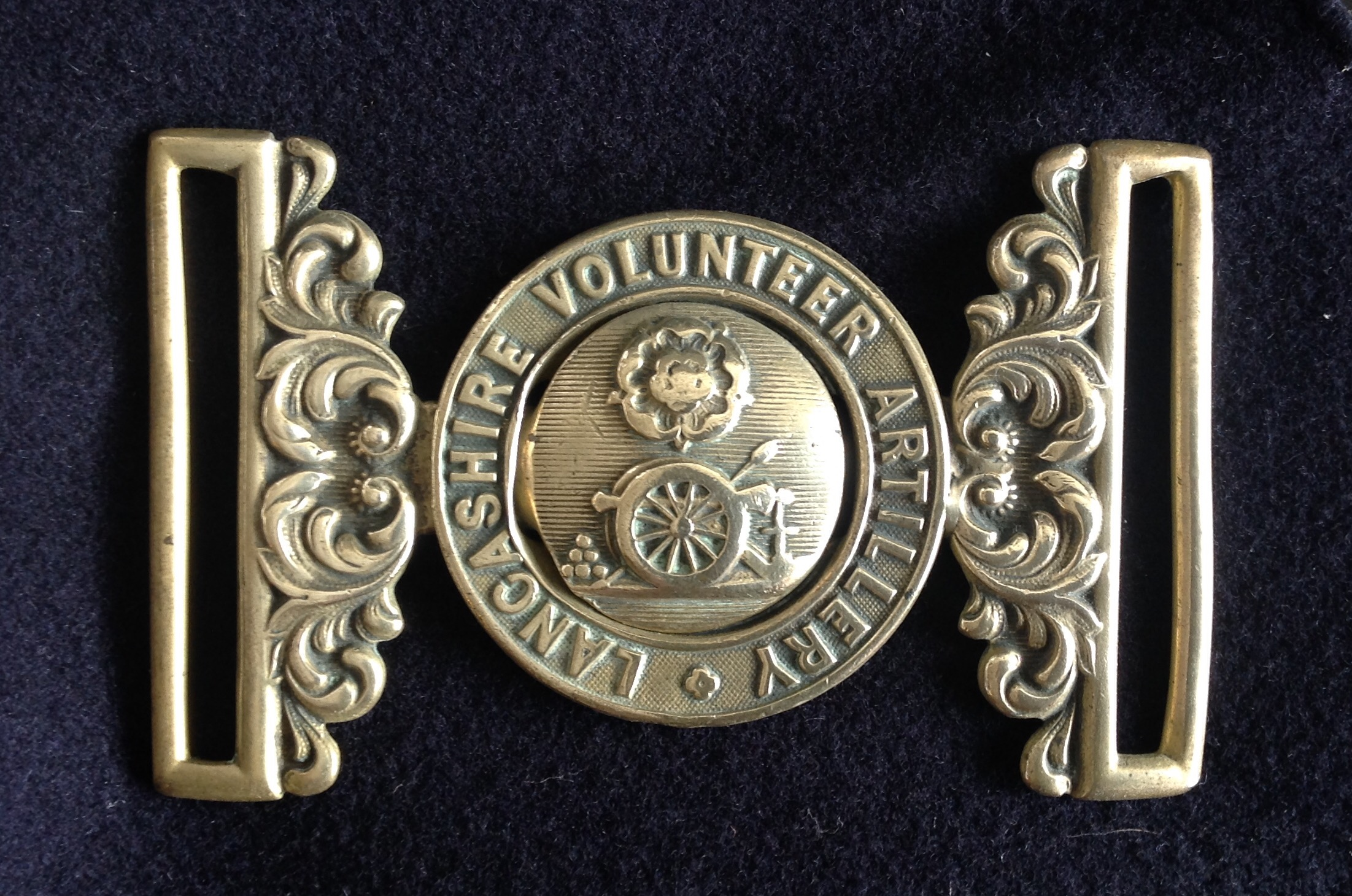
- 19th Century waistbelt of the Lancashire Volunteer Artillery
- Active: 1859–1973
- Country: United Kingdom
- Branch: Territorial Army
- Role: Garrison artillery Heavy artillery Field artillery Medium artillery Anti-tank artillery
- Size: 1–3 Brigades/Regiments
- Garrison/HQ: Liverpool
- Nickname: 'The Old 4th Brigade'
- Engagements: World War I: Somme; Sinai and Palestine; World War II: Dunkirk; Greece; Crete; Keren; Western Desert; Burma; Italy; North West Europe

Commanders
- Notable commanders: Brig H.K. Dimoline; Brig Sir Philip Toosey

The 4th Lancashire Artillery Volunteers, later renamed to the 4th West Lancashire Brigade, known as 'The Old 4th', was a part-time unit of the British Army's Royal Artillery founded in Liverpool in 1859. It served on the Western Front during World War I, one of its members winning the Victoria Cross at Cambrai. Between the world wars the unit pioneered mechanical traction methods. During World War II it formed three regiments that saw action at Dunkirk, in East Africa, on Crete, at Tobruk (where one of its regiments was captured), in Burma, and in the final campaigns in Italy and North West Europe. It continued in the post-war Territorial Army until 1973.

== Volunteer force ==
=== Origin ===
The enthusiasm for the Volunteer movement following an invasion scare in 1859 saw the creation of many units composed of part-time soldiers eager to supplement the Regular British Army in time of need. One of the first and largest such units was the 4th Lancashire Artillery Volunteers, raised by the Liverpool shipowner James Walter and drawing its recruits from clerks and office personnel of firms in that city. Six hundred Volunteers marched from Birchfield Barracks to St George's Hall, Liverpool, on 22 November 1859 to take the oath of allegiance. The unit officially came into existence on 5 December and its first headquarters (HQ) was at the Liverpool and London Insurance Company office in Dale Street, with a store in a private house at 51 Salisbury Street. The first commanding officer (CO) was Lieutenant-Colonel James Bourne (appointed 7 January 1860), a local merchant and colliery owner who was also Lt-Col Commandant of the Royal Lancashire Artillery Militia. The corps had an establishment of a brigade of eight companies, termed batteries from 1861.

By 1862 the 4th Lancashire AV had accepted 50–60 mechanics 'of the highest class' to supplement the middle-class clerks of the original recruits. In 1861 the unit's arms store was moved to 49 Mason Street, and by 1872 its HQ was at 52 Mason Street, where there was a large storage shed. In 1880 it was in Nos 21, 23 and 25 Mason Street and by 1890 at 22 Highgate Street, Edge Hill, Liverpool.

When the Volunteer corps were consolidated in 1880, the unit was offered a more senior number, but chose to retain the proud title of 'The 4th Brigade'.

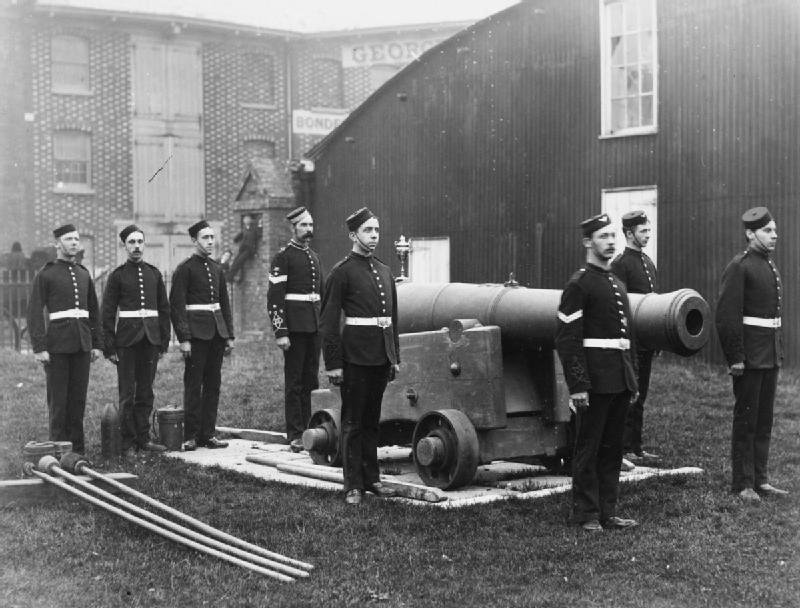
Volunteer artillery with a converted RML 64-pdr in 1895.

=== Equipment ===
The 4th Lancashire AVC began their gun drill using chairs, a stove-pipe and mops, then graduated to wooden models. In September 1861 the War Office (WO) ordered that the unit should be issued with eight 24-pounder guns. These weapons were unserviceable and apparently did not arrive until a year later. The WO refused to supply traversing platforms, so Major George Melly (who became CO in 1863) had two guns mounted on sliding carriages and traversing platforms, and presented them to the unit. An organisation called the Mount Vernon Green Syndicate provided money for the unit to purchase four brass 9-pounder field guns, without carriages or limbers. Equipment varied during the corps' history: in 1878 it had eight 24-pdr and two 32-pdr smooth-bore muzzle-loading (SBML) guns on upright carriages, and one 40-pdr Armstrong rifled breech-loader (RBL). In 1885 it possessed an additional 64-pdr rifled muzzle-loader (RML) converted from a bored-out 8-inch gun and fitted with an inner 'A' tube.

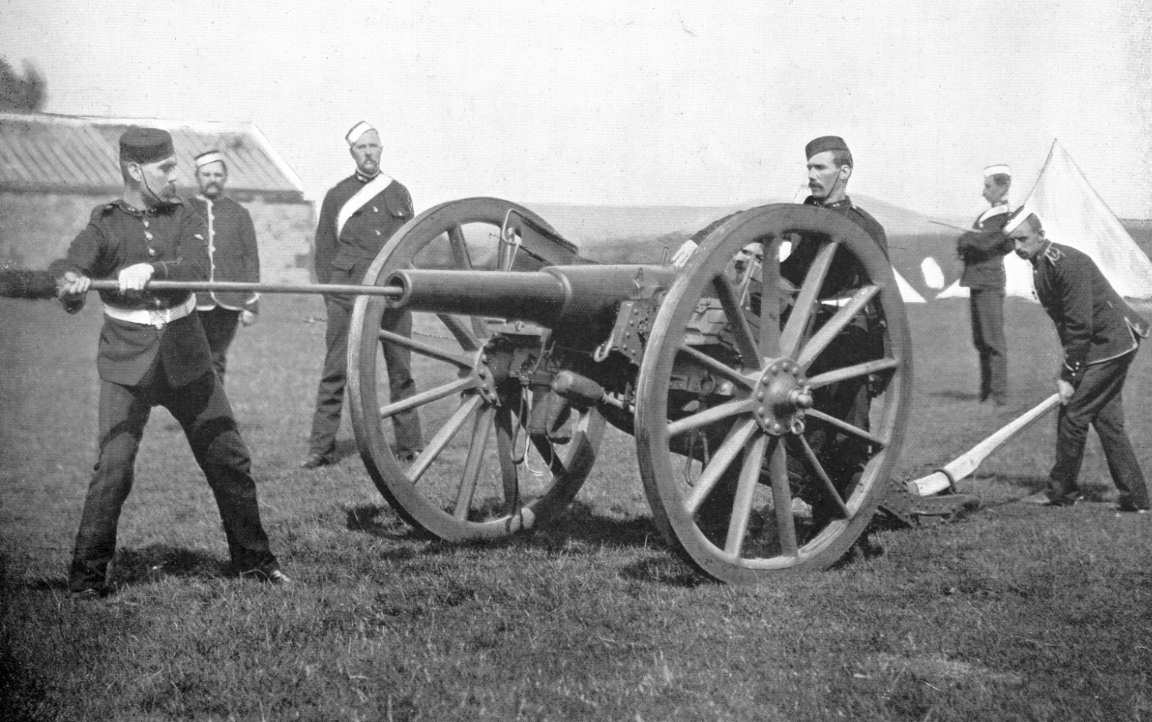
16-Pounder RML gun manned by Artillery Volunteers in 1897.

The AVCs were intended to serve as garrison artillery manning fixed defences, but a number of the early units manned semi-mobile 'position batteries' of smooth-bore field guns pulled by agricultural horses. However, the WO refused to pay for the upkeep of field guns and the concept died out in the 1870s. It was revived in 1888 when some Volunteer batteries were reorganised as 'position artillery' with 16-pounder RML guns to work alongside the Volunteer infantry brigades. The 4th Lancashire AVC was issued with four of these guns in 1889, and the experiment was so successful that within three years the corps had four such batteries.

=== Royal Garrison Artillery ===
In 1882 all the AVCs were affiliated to one of the territorial garrison divisions of the Royal Artillery (RA) and the 4th Lancashires became part of the Lancashire Division. In 1889 the structure was altered, and the corps joined the Southern Division. In 1899 the RA was divided into separate field and garrison branches, and the artillery volunteers were all assigned to the Royal Garrison Artillery (RGA). In 1902 their titles were changed, the Liverpool unit becoming the 4th Lancashire Royal Garrison Artillery (Volunteers), designated as heavy artillery. The following year the position batteries were redesignated as heavy batteries.

In 1900 the 4th Lancashires found a permanent HQ at The Grange, on the corner of Edge Lane and Botanic Road, Liverpool. This was a large old farmhouse to which the unit added a large covered drill shed.

== Territorial Force ==
When the Volunteers were subsumed into the new Territorial Force (TF) under the Haldane Reforms of 1908, the unit transferred to the Royal Field Artillery (RFA) and as the senior West Lancashire unit it was offered the title of I (or 1st) West Lancashire Brigade. Once again it chose to be the IV (or 4th) West Lancashire (Howitzer) Brigade, with the following organisation:

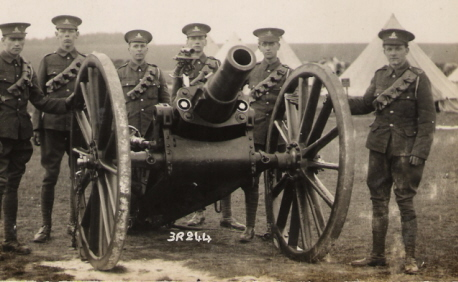
Territorial gunners training with a 5-inch howitzer before World War I.

IV West Lancashire (Howitzer) Brigade, RFA

- HQ: The Grange, Edge Lane, Liverpool
- 7th Lancashire (H) Battery
- 8th Lancashire (H) Battery
- 4th West Lancashire (H) Ammunition Column

The unit formed part of the TF's West Lancashire Division. Its batteries were each equipped with four 5-inch howitzers.

== World War I ==
=== Mobilisation ===
When war broke out on 4 August 1914 the IV West Lancashire Bde was at its annual practice camp at Larkhill under Lt-Col S.Heywood Melly, the fourth member of his family to command it. The brigade was immediately ordered to return to Liverpool to mobilise. Mobilisation equipment was scarce for all units: the IV West Lancs solved its shortage of draught animals by requisitioning tram horses from the Douglas Bay Horse Tramway on the Isle of Man.

The TF was intended for home service, but on 10 August its members were invited to volunteer for overseas service. Almost the whole of the IV West Lancs brigade did so. On 15 August 1914, the WO issued instructions to separate those men who had signed up for home service only, and form these into reserve units. Recruits were also pouring in and on 31 August, the formation of a reserve or 2nd Line unit was authorised for each 1st Line unit where 60 per cent or more of the men had volunteered for overseas service. The titles of these 2nd Line units would be the same as the original, but distinguished by a '2/' prefix. In this way duplicate batteries, brigades and divisions were created from the recruits, mirroring those TF formations being sent overseas.

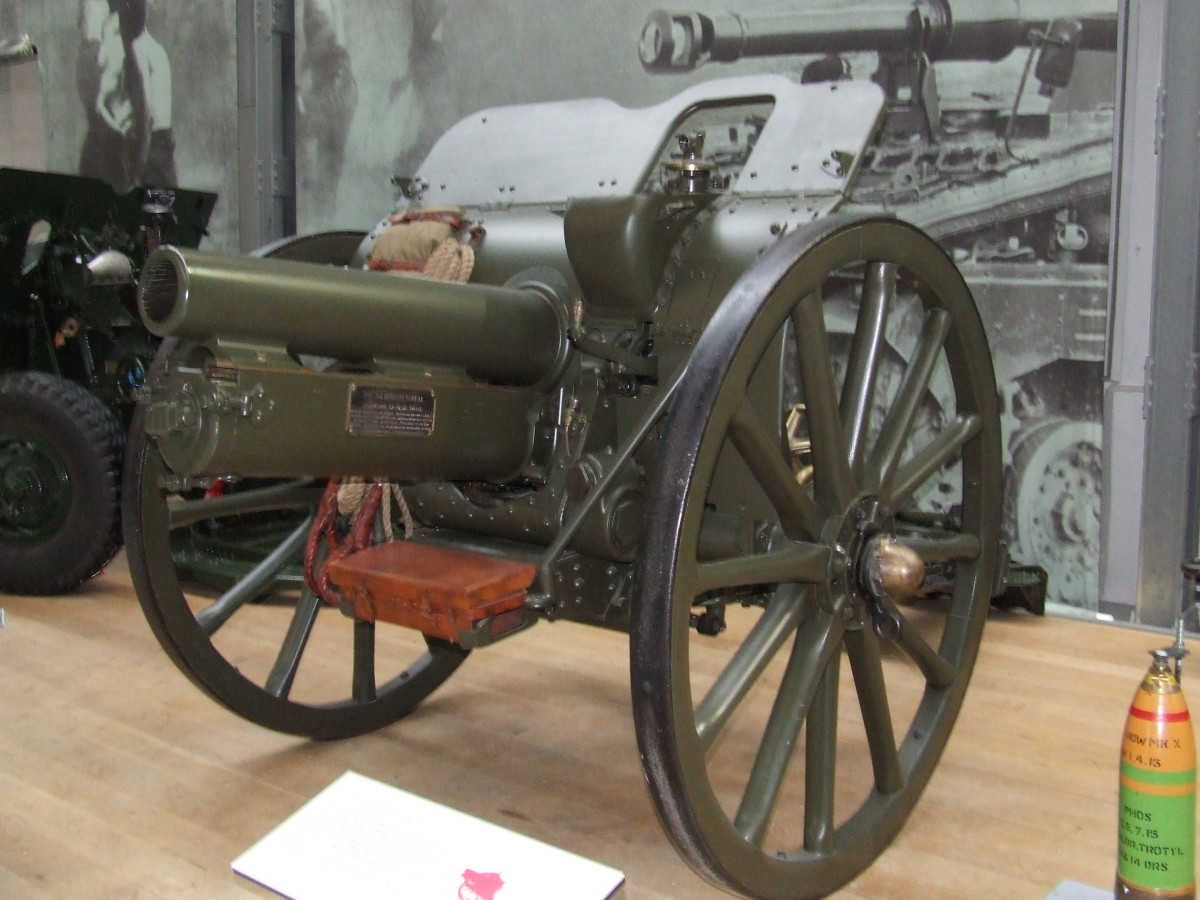
4.5-inch howitzer preserved at the Royal Artillery Museum.

=== 1/IV West Lancashire Brigade ===
Immediately after mobilisation the brigade moved into camp at Allerton for training. On 26 October it went with the West Lancashire Division to Kent and was billeted in villages near Sevenoaks. Between November 1914 and April 1915 all the division's infantry units were posted away to reinforce the British Expeditionary Force (BEF) fighting on the Western Front. The Brigade Ammunition Columns were absorbed into a Divisional Ammunition Column at Ightham, which was then sent to reinforce the troops in Egypt. The rest of the divisional artillery then joined the 2nd West Lancashire Division, which was forming round Canterbury. The 1/IV Bde moved to Thanington Without in May.

In September 1915 the brigade was re-equipped with modern 4.5-inch howitzers (handing the old 5-inch howitzers over to its 2nd Line unit) and ordered to proceed overseas with the rest of the 1st West Lancashire Divisional Artillery, which was to become the divisional artillery for the 2nd Canadian Division. The brigade embarked at Southampton on 28 September, the guns and horses aboard an Elder Dempster liner and the men aboard the Isle of Man packet boat SS Mona's Queen. They disembarked at Le Havre the following day.

==== Western Front ====
The brigade took up old gun positions in the Kemmel sector of the line, with Bde HQ at Locre, 1/7th Bty at Vierstraat and 1/8th Bty at Lindenhoek at the foot of Mont Kemmel. The brigade fired its first rounds on 7 October, though ammunition was restricted to 50 rounds per battery per week. The brigade remained in this 'quiet' sector, suffering only a few wounded, until 12 December when it went into reserve near St Omer before moving to Pont-Remy in the Somme sector on 3 January 1916. The West Lancashire Division (now the 55th (1st West Lancashire) Division was being reformed in France, and its former units concentrated at Pont-Remy.

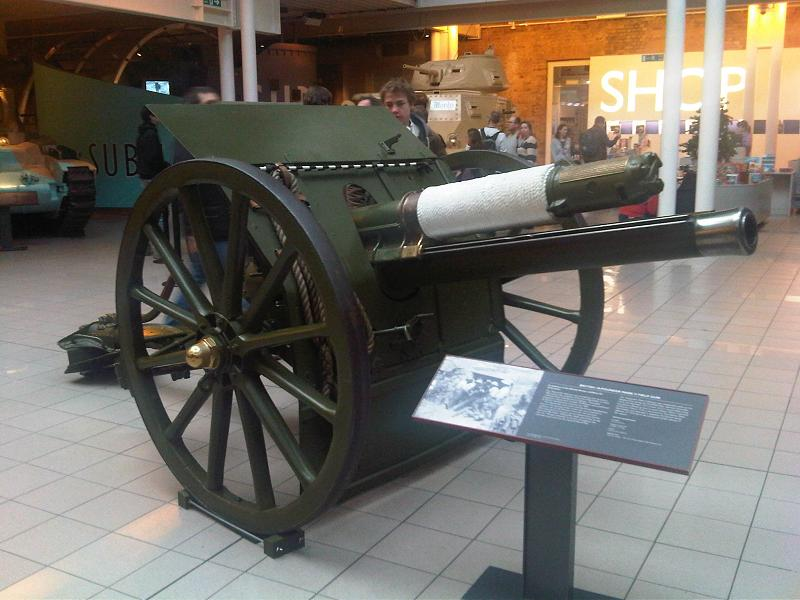
18-pounder preserved at the Imperial War Museum.

The 1/IV West Lancs Bde was brought up to a strength of three batteries on 9 February when B (H) Bty joined from LXXXV Bde ('Kitchener's Army' volunteers from 18th (Eastern) Division) to become C (H) Bty. Then the field artillery of the BEF was reorganised in May 1916: 1/IV West Lancs Bde was numbered CCLXXVIII Bde (278 Bde) and its batteries became A, B and C on 15 May. The three batteries were then distributed to the other brigades within the divisional artillery, so that each had a D (Howitzer) battery: A (1/7th Lancashire) went to CCLXXVI (1/II West Lancs), B (1/8th) to CCLXXV (1/I West Lancs) and C to CCLXXVII (1/III West Lancs). They were replaced in CCLXXVIII by the D batteries of the respective brigades, giving the following organisation:

CCLXXVIII Brigade, RFA

- A Bty – former D/CCLXXV
- B Bty – former D/CCLXXVI
- C Bty – former D/CCLXXVII

These three batteries were recently formed within their respective brigades, and each was equipped with four 18-pounder guns.

==== Somme ====
From February, 55th Divisional Artillery had been deployed in the Crinchon Valley, a quiet sector, but on 20 July the brigades marched south to join in the Battle of the Somme. They went into action on 1 August around Maricourt Wood facing Guillemont village while the front line was under a heavy German bombardment. The batteries found themselves assigned patches of ground devoid of any cover or concealment, except a few captured German dugouts. For two weeks the firing was almost continuous, the gun detachments working in shifts relieved by gunners from the waggon lines. The observation posts (OPs) in the infantry positions were very dangerous and one Forward Observation Officer (FOO) was killed getting to his OP.

The 55th Division launched its first attack on Guillemont at dawn on 8 August, supported by the divisional artillery firing a new-style Creeping barrage. However, the centre of the attack was held up and the barrage had to be brought back. In the end the attack failed with heavy casualties, as did its renewal next morning, when the infantry advanced without a preliminary bombardment but protected by the creeping barrage. The division made a further failed attack on Guillemont on 12 August. The artillery was briefly rested on 15 August, but was back in action for the early September fighting on the Somme: the battles of Guillemont (4–6 September) and Ginchy (9 September). The latter was an afternoon attack after the field artillery had carried out a deliberate bombardment in the morning, followed by firing the now-familiar creeping barrage. The attack was only partially successful, but the division saw better results in its attack on Gueudecourt during the Battle of Morval (25 September). This time the infantry kept close to their barrage and took their first and second objectives with ease. They repeated the success two days later in taking some stubborn German strongpoints and the retreating enemy were caught in the open by the divisional artillery, which also broke up a German counter-attack. Casualties in the artillery brigade during August had been predominantly due to accidents such as premature explosions of faulty ammunition, and in September had been concentrated in the waggon lines, which were bombed nightly. The guns were relieved on 28 September and moved to the Ypres Salient.

There was a further reorganisation of the divisional artillery in October 1916: C Bty of the brigade was broken up between the other two to bring them up to six guns each; then A and B Btys were assigned to CCLXXV and CCLXXVII Bdes respectively. CCLXXVIII (formerly 1/IV West Lancashire) Bde then ceased to exist. The former 1/7th and 1/8th Lancashire Btys continued to serve with their new brigades for the rest of the war.

==== Victoria Cross ====
On 30 November 1917, Sergeant Cyril Edward Gourley of D (H)/CCLXXVI Bty (the former 1/7th Lancashire Bty) won a Victoria Cross (VC). (Note: Sergeant Gourley is reputed to be the only Territorial Gunner ever to win the VC; in fact, Sgt William Gosling of the III Wessex Bde, RFA, TF, was also awarded the VC while serving in a trench mortar battery.) Born in Liverpool and educated at Liverpool University he had joined the IV West Lancashire Brigade in May 1914, and transferred with his battery to CCLXXVI Bde in 1916. He had already won a Military Medal (MM) at Ypres, then on 30 November he was sent up to take over an advanced section of 4.5-inch howitzers at Little Priel Farm during the Battle of Cambrai. Although the enemy got within 400 yards (370 m) of the section's front and flank, and with snipers in their rear, Gourley managed to keep one gun in action all day, firing over open sights at enemy parties in full view. Every time his section were driven from their guns, he went back, carrying ammunition and laying the gun himself, assisted by first one and then another of the detachment. When the enemy advanced he pulled his gun out of its pit and engaged a machine gun at 500 yards (460 m), knocking it out with a direct hit. He successfully withdrew his guns at nightfall. Gourley was awarded the VC and a number of the other gunners from his detachment won the MM.

==== Ammunition Column ====
While the West Lancashire Division was stationed in Kent in 1915 the Brigade Ammunition Columns were absorbed into the Divisional Ammunition Column (DAC), with the men of 1/IV West Lancs Bde forming 4th Section. In May 1915 the DAC was sent to Egypt where it was attached to 42nd (East Lancashire) Division but kept its original name. While in Egypt the DAC sent reinforcements to 42nd Division's batteries fighting at Gallipoli, with a detachment of 4th Section serving at Cape Helles on ammunition duties. The DAC's first active service as a whole was during the Turkish advance on the Suez Canal in July and August 1916, which was defeated at the Battle of Romani. When 42nd Division was sent to the Western Front in February 1917, the West Lancashire DAC remained in Egypt to form Eastern Force Ammunition Unit, organised for desert warfare, supporting 52nd (Lowland), 53rd (Welsh) and 54th (East Anglian) Divisions. It marched across the Sinai desert in time to join in the Second Battle of Gaza, and then served in this role for the rest of the war, though retaining its original title. Throughout, 4th Section was manned by its original IV Brigade men.

=== 2/IV West Lancashire Brigade ===
The 2nd West Lancashire (later 57th (2nd West Lancashire)) divisional artillery suffered from a lack of arms and equipment, which seriously delayed its training. One of the field artillery brigades even had to borrow old Carbines from the Preston Church Lad's Brigade. The gunners trained as best they could at Weeton Camp. Eventually, in July 1915, each brigade received two 15-pounder Mk I guns (without sights). Finally, in September the 2nd Line batteries were able to join the rest of the division in Kent and the 2/IV Bde took over the 5-inch howitzers from its 1st Line who were embarking for France.

Serious training could now begin, and was accelerated in January 1916 when the 2/IV Bde received modern 4.5-inch howitzers. In July 1916 the divisional artillery was reorganised on the same lines as those already in France: 2/IV West Lancs Bde was broken up before it had time to adopt its assigned number (CCLXXXVIII or 288) and 2/7th and 2/8th Lancashire batteries were dispersed among the other brigades.

== Interwar ==
In the autumn of 1919, not long after the demobilised men had returned home, Maj Edward Hemelryk (one of the brigade's prewar officers) advertised for former members of the 'Old 4th' to attend a concert where their former CO, Lt-Col S. Heywood Melly, urged them to join the new Territorial Army (TA) when it was launched to replace the TF. On 21 May 1920, Hemelryk was asked by the commander of 55th (West Lancs) Division to form a new medium artillery brigade from the former 4th West Lancs howitzer brigade and the two heavy batteries of the former Lancashire Heavy Brigade, Royal Garrison Artillery. It was to be designated the 4th West Lancashire Medium Brigade, RGA, and consist of two horse-drawn batteries each of six 6-inch howitzers, and two tractor-drawn batteries, one of six 6-inch howitzers, and one of 60-pounders. Recruitment began well, but was disrupted when a Defence Force was formed in case of trouble during the coal strike of April 1921. Lieutenant-Col Hemelryk was asked to raise a 4.5-inch howitzer battery, which took over The Grange and the brigade's five permanent instructors. The Defence Force battery was stood down after its 90-day term of service, and recruitment and training for the TA brigade resumed.

In November 1921, as part of the renumbering of the TA, the brigade was officially designated 59th Medium Brigade, but after a year of representations from Hemelryk and the West Lancs TA Association over the loss of its 'Old 4th' title, it was changed to 59th (4th West Lancashire) Medium Brigade, RGA with the following organisation:

- RHQ at The Grange
- 233 (West Lancashire) Medium Bty
- 234 (West Lancashire) Medium Bty (Howitzer)
- 235 (West Lancashire) Medium Bty (Howitzer)
- 236 (West Lancashire) Medium Bty (Howitzer)

(Later, only 236 Bty was designated 'Howitzer'.) The brigade was designated 'Army Troops' in 55th (West Lancashire) Divisional Area. The RGA was subsumed into the Royal Artillery (RA) in 1924, and in 1938 the RA changed its standard unit designation from 'brigade' to 'regiment'. In 1933 the Springwood Cadet Battalion became the 59th (4th West Lancs) Cadet Battery, affiliated to the brigade and commanded by one of its officers.

The WO had decided on horse-traction only for TA medium artillery in peacetime, but Lt-Col Hemelryk had other ideas, and by the annual camp at Larkhill in 1923 the batteries were all towed by Fordson agricultural tractors. The Ford Service Depot at Edge Lane demonstrated that two of these tractors could recover a badly ditched gun without assistance. By 1927 the brigade was also hauling its General Service wagons by tractor. The following year the 60-pdrs were hauled by Latil tractors and the 6-inch howitzers by six-wheeled Morris lorries, and in March 1929 the brigade was fully mechanised, with a saving in manpower requirements.

The brigade's batteries regularly excelled in shooting at practice camps and in the biennial King's Cup competition of the National Artillery Association. This culminated in 1935 with 236 Bty under Captain Philip Toosey winning the cup with its 6-inch howitzers despite competing in the fire-and-movement finals against field batteries armed with the handy 18-pounder. 59th (4th West Lancs) was the first medium brigade to win the King's Cup, and it retained the cup by a record margin in 1937.

== World War II ==
=== Mobilisation ===
The TA was doubled in size following the Munich Crisis of 1938, with existing units splitting to form duplicates before the outbreak of World War II. 59th Medium Regiment reorganised in May 1939 as follows:

59th (4th West Lancashire) Medium Regiment, RA

- RHQ at The Grange, Lt-Col H.C. Servaes (CO since December 1936)
- 235 (West Lancashire) Med Bty
- 236 (West Lancashire) Med Bty

68th (4th West Lancashire) Medium Regiment, RA

- RHQ at Green Lane, Liverpool, Lt-Col H.K. Dimoline, MBE, (previously officer commanding (OC) 233 Bty)
- 233 (West Lancashire) Med Bty
- 234 (West Lancashire) Med Bty

By now, batteries consisted of eight 60-pdrs or 6-inch howitzers. Both regiments mobilised in Western Command.

=== 59th (4th West Lancs) Medium Regiment ===
The efficient 59th Med Rgt had been selected as one of the first units in the new British Expeditionary Force. The TA was mobilised on 26 August and the regiment concentrated at Tarporley, and was joined by a detachment of the Royal Corps of Signals (RCS) and a Light Aid Detachment (LAD) of the Royal Army Ordnance Corps by 2 September, the day before war was declared. As well as modern Scammell gun-tractors for its iron-wheeled 1918-vintage guns, it was supplied with a collection of requisitioned civilian trucks and vans. An advance party set out for France on 24 September, and two days later the transport and equipment went to Newport to embark on the Isle of Man packet boat SS Ben-my-Chree. On 3 October the personnel entrained for Southampton. On 5 October the regiment concentrated under Lt-Col Servaes near Laval where it came under II Corps and moved up to the Lille area.

==== Battle of France ====
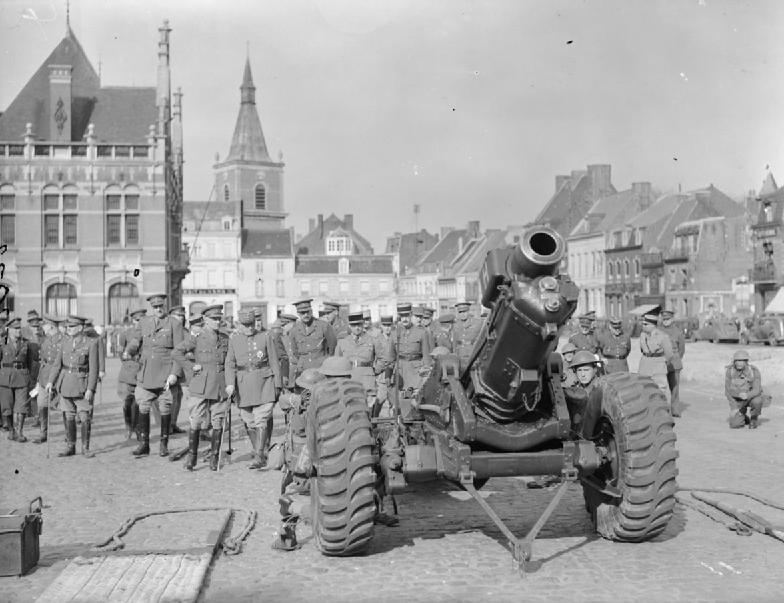
6-inch Howitzer being inspected in France, 1940. (This version has fully pneumatic tyres).

On arrival, RHQ and 235 Bty occupied Herrin and 236 Bty was in Chemy; they stayed in these villages throughout the winter of 1939–40, sending working parties to dig gun pits at Ascq near the Belgian frontier, and continuing with training. On 1 March the regiment moved to the suburb of Fives Lille, and replaced its steel gun wheels with solid rubber tyres. There was a Luftwaffe air raid on Lille on the night of 9/10 May and the Battle of France began the next day with the German invasion of the Low Countries. The BEF responded by executing the pre-arranged Plan D, advancing into Belgium to take up defences along the River Dyle. By 15 May the regiment was with II Corps on the Dyle Front, preparing positions at Bethem to cover Louvain.

However, the Panzers of the Wehrmacht's Army Group A had broken through the Ardennes and threatened the BEF's flank, so on 16 May it began to withdraw to the River Escaut, before the regiment had the chance to occupy the Berthem positions. On 20 May, 59th Med Rgt came into action at Templeuve-en-Pévèle, where the batteries were shelled and suffered their first casualties. On 22 May they pulled back to previously constructed gun pits covering the River Marcq at Flers. On 26 May the regiment retreated along roads jammed with refugees through Ploegsteert to Neuve Eglise, then next day to Killem-Linde. Here it came under the command of 1st Division (Maj-Gen Harold Alexander) and was ordered to destroy unwanted vehicles, and to spike the guns if they could not be got across the canal into the BEF's perimeter round Dunkirk. However, by pushing on, the regiment got all its guns into Dunkirk, the only medium regiment that achieved this.

The regiment was deployed near Ghyvelde, with the batteries either side of a canal, linked by a footbridge; 235 Bty was personally deployed by Maj-Gen Alexander. The batteries fired off a lot of spare ammunition, though OPs were difficult to find in the flat country. 236 Battery came under fire, but shifted 200 yards (180 m) to the flank, while Germans continued to shell their old position. Early on 31 May the regiment was ordered to thin out, leaving just the gun detachments and signallers while the remainder went into Dunkirk to join the evacuation (Operation Dynamo) that was under way. 235 Battery came out of action when its gun positions were inundated by seawater entering the breached dykes; 236 Bty remained in action until 10.00 on 1 June. Then the guns were spiked, the sights removed, and the Scammells driven into the canals, while the exhausted gun detachments made their way to Malo-les-Bains. They waded out to the small boats and were transferred to a Royal Navy minesweeper. The CO, Lt-Col Servaes, had become separated on the road, and was one of the last to leave.

==== Home defence ====
The men returning from Dunkirk were scattered all over England, but 59th Med Rgt soon concentrated at Larkhill and then moved to Wimborne Minster to dig defences and prepare to defend the town with just 40 rifles and three hired trucks. On 5 July the regiment left to take up home defence roles in Eastern Command, RHQ and 235 Bty at Great Dunmow under XI Corps and 236 Bty at Whittlesford under II Corps. By September, RHQ was at Leiston under 55th (West Lancashire) Division and the batteries were deployed with 235 in defences between Lowestoft and Felixstowe and 236 in the GHQ Line of pillboxes along the Rivers Cam and Ouse, a front of 100 miles (160 km) to a depth of by 80 miles (130 km). It was equipped with a variety of obsolete equipment including 4-inch naval guns, 6-pounder naval guns cut down for service in World War I tanks, 6-inch mortars and Lewis guns. On 24 July Lt-Col Servaes was promoted to Brigadier to command the medium artillery in VIII Corps, and on 24 September the regiment provided a cadre to train 902 Home Defence Battery.

The regiment continued in Eastern Command in late 1940. It concentrated at Cambridge in January 1941, where it received four 6-inch howitzers on loan. In March it moved to the South Coast, where it came under IV Corps, affiliated to 55th Division. With RHQ at Battle Abbey School, it prepared gun pits and OPs, although it only had five Mk I 60-pdrs and one 75 mm gun. Its LAD was withdrawn in August. In October the regiment moved to the Cotswolds, 235 Bty at Moreton-in-Marsh and 236 at Stow-on-the-Wold, where it was re-equipped with 4.5-inch howitzers and Quad gun tractors. In December the regiment moved to County Durham in Northern Command, with RHQ at Beamish Hall, 235 Bty at Stanley and 236 Bty at Annfield Plain. In June the following year it moved to Yorkshire, first to Stamford Bridge and Scrayingham and then in August to Selby and Riccall.

By now the regiment was 100 men below strength after sending away training cadres and drafts for units overseas; in July 1942 it was ordered to send another draft of four officers and 150 other ranks to the Middle East, which deprived it of many of its most experienced men. At the end of 1942 it was ordered to undertake the training of a war-formed infantry battalion, 9th Bn, Essex Regiment, to convert it into 11th Medium Regiment, RA. This was done by cross-posting half of the personnel of each regiment for three months. 59th Medium Rgt was stationed at Hunmanby, with 11th Med Rgt five miles away at Rudston. They were re-equipped with the new 5.5-inch medium gun.

In May 1943 the reunited regiment moved to Kent, where it joined 3rd Army Group Royal Artillery (AGRA), part of 21st Army Group training for the Allied invasion of Normandy (Operation Overlord). RHQ was quartered at Hildenborough, 235 Bty at Crockham Hill, and 236 Bty at Four Elms. As well as training, it also acted as a demonstration regiment: in Exercise Breachmine it showed that accurate intensive fire by medium artillery could clear safe lanes through minefields. In another exercise it demonstrated a 'crash action', getting from column of route to firing the first round in 2.5 minutes, to prove that a specialised infantry gun was not required. In May 1944 all space in southern England was required for the concentration of the 'Overlord' assault troops, so the regiment moved to Alnmouth and the practice ranges at Redesdale. It was also issued with M3 Half-track OP vehicles.

==== Normandy ====
The regiment moved to its concentration area at Worthing on 9 June, then to the assembly area at Wanstead Flats, finally embarking aboard two LSTs at Victoria Hard in the Port of London on 25 June. It landed at La Valette on 28 June and concentrated at Lantheuil. The regiment fired its first rounds on 2 July in support of a Canadian attack on Carpiquet Airfield, and supported I Corps in the two-day battle for Caen (Operation Charnwood). On 10 July it moved to Colleville, where it was under fire and on 15 July a direct hit on a gun position killed the second-in-command (Maj W.K Crawford), the OC 235 Bty (Maj Arthur Toosey, brother of Philip) and an entire gun detachment (11 in all). Next day an OP was hit on Hill 112 with further casualties. It stayed for a month in these positions, before moving on 5 August to support the Canadian advance up the River Orne, then firing into the Falaise Pocket as the break-out from the Normandy beachhead began. There followed rapid movements across Northern France and Belgium. Regimental OP parties crossed the Seine with the assault troops of 15th (Scottish) Division, advanced in tanks with 7th Armoured Division, and then the regiment operated as 'Crawforce' (under the CO, Lt-Col D.I. Crawford) with heavy, medium, and anti-tank guns under command. The regiment reached Antwerp Airport with 53rd (Welsh) Division by 11 September.

==== North West Europe ====
'Crawforce', now '59th Med Rgt Group', moved east to support 15th (S) Division at Gheel, where its fire broke up a strong counter-attack against the bridgehead over the Meuse–Escaut Canal. During Operation Market Garden the regiment operated in XXX Corps' 'corridor' with virtually no infantry cover against German troops on the flank, while firing on targets such as Best on the Wilhelmina Canal to assist the advance. Reaching St Oedernrode on 29 September the regiment deployed just off the Nijmegen road under shellfire. It stayed there until 8 October, then crossed Nijmegen Bridge and spent 10 days in 'the island' on the far bank under 3 AGRA supporting 50th (Northumbrian) Infantry Division, and driving off a counter-attack launched against nearby US troops.

On 22 October the regiment took part in Operation Pheasant to clear the approaches to 's-Hertogenbosch, sending forward five OPs in tanks to accompany the attack. The three-day operation led to ammunition shortages. On 30 October the regiment was rushed east to Udenhout, where it was engaged in firing to demolish enemy OPs in church towers. It then operated with 3 AGRA supporting XII Corps in clearing the area towards the Meuse (Dutch: Maas) at Venlo. Near Venlo a single gun was ordered on a 'roving' mission, but took a wrong turning into enemy territory and the whole detachment was killed or captured; the regiment also suffered casualties from incoming fire. Already 38 men short, it was now told that every artillery regiment had to supply a draft of 24 gunners to reinforce the infantry. 59th Medium Rgt took part in the massive artillery concentration to clear Blerick (Operation Guildford). Further operations were halted by winter weather.

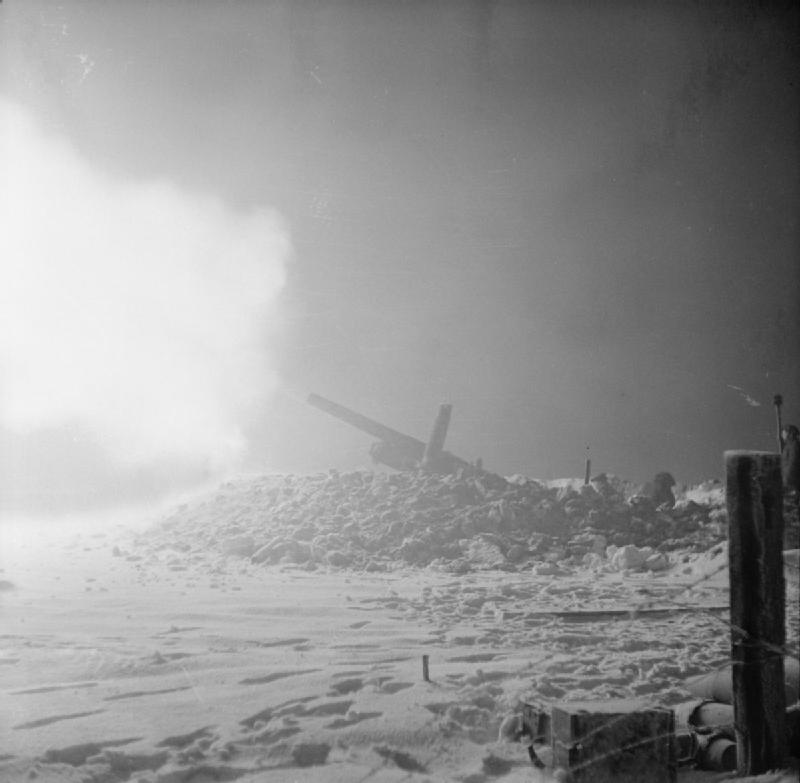
5.5-inch guns of 236 Bty, 59th Medium Rgt, firing at dawn before XII Corps' attack at Sittard, 16 January 1945.

The lull was broken on 22 December when the regiment was rushed to a position north of Louvain due to the German breakthrough in the Ardennes (the Battle of the Bulge). On 29 December it moved near Namur and then on 2 January 1945 began a difficult move into the Ardennes as part of 4 AGRA in support of XXX Corps' advance against the northern edge of the 'Bulge'. After the crisis was over, the regiment was moved north to Sittard to support XII Corps against Roermond in Operation Blackcock on 16 January. Next it moved another 70 miles (110 km) to join the artillery preparation for Operation Veritable to clear the Reichswald. The 59th opened fire at 05.00 on 8 February and continued firing all day (roughly 250 rounds per gun). Following the advancing troops along the forest tracks was a serious problem for the gun tractors and ammunition lorries. Once the regiment closed up to the Maas there were for a time no troops between the guns and the enemy across the river, the gunners having to prepare their own defences.

==== Germany ====
On 24 February the regiment crossed the Meuse (Dutch: Maas) and moved to Bedburg to come under command of 2 Canadian AGRA for Operation Blockbuster, for which 500 rounds per gun had been stockpiled. By the night of 6/7 March the regiment had advanced to the Hochwald Gap, but at dawn found itself under observation from enemy positions. It came under shellfire and suffered casualties while digging in, but did some accurate counter-battery (CB) firing. On 19 March RHQ moved a short distance to its assigned position for Operation Plunder, the assault crossing of the Rhine. The batteries moved in secretly on 23 March, leaving dummy guns at their old positions. The regiment was in close support for 227th (Highland) Brigade of 15th (S) Division, with OPs accompanying 10th Battalion Highland Light Infantry and 2nd Bn Argyll and Sutherland Highlanders. The bombardment started at 18.00 on 23 March and 15th (S) Division began its assault crossing at 02.00 on 24 March. Although some of 227th Bde's troops were landed in the wrong places, the OPs landing on the far back were able to call down effective fire on targets to their front. The guns ceased fire while the airborne forces passed overhead to drop in Operation Varsity, then resumed, breaking up counter-attacks and supporting the advance to link up with the airborne forces across the Issel. On 28 March the regiment crossed the Rhine at Xanten and supported an attack on Bocholt.

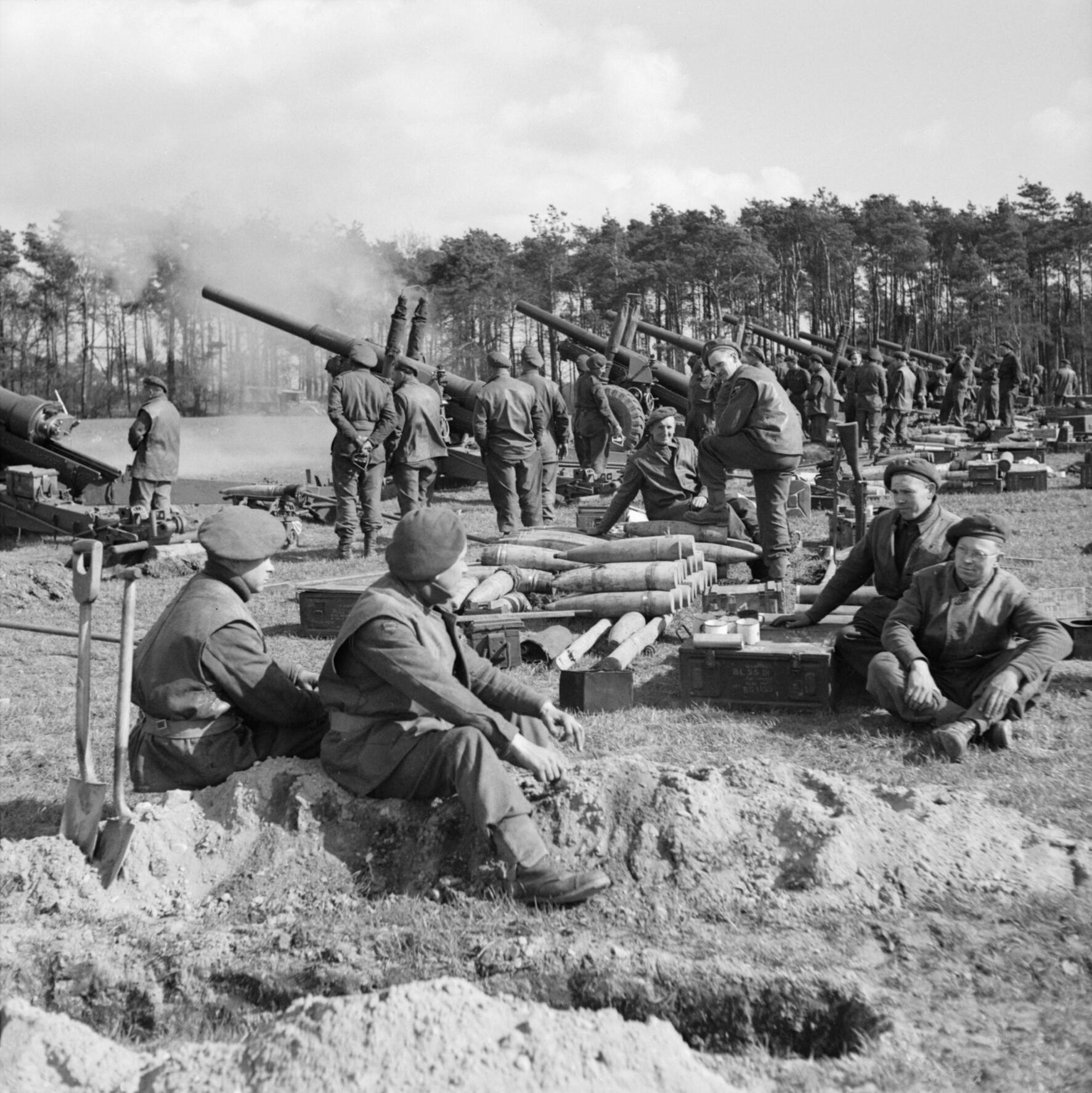
5.5-inch guns of 235 and 236 Btys firing in support of the Rhine crossing, 21 March 1945.

21st Army Group could not support all its troops in the pursuit across North Germany, and on 29 March 59th Medium Regiment was 'grounded'. It re-crossed the Rhine and was rested for two weeks. On 13 April, under the command of 9 AGRA, it crossed the Rhine once more and moved into Germany to begin battlefield clearance and occupation duties. On 28 April the scattered regiment was concentrated and sent forward to support the troops on the Elbe. It fired for the last time (eight rounds per gun) on 2 May, and the German surrender at Lüneburg Heath followed two days later.

The regiment was then used for occupation duties in the Harburg, Hamburg, area, later at Bochum, mounting guards, supervising German working parties engaged on reconstruction, and distributing aid to the displaced persons camps. Demobilisation proceeded through 1945, the guns were handed in during January 1946, and on 1 March the regiment was placed in suspended animation.

=== 68th (4th West Lancs) Medium Regiment ===
On its formation in April 1939, this new regiment established its HQ at Green Lane, Liverpool, and commenced training. On mobilisation it moved to Tattenhall in Cheshire for advanced training with 59th (Staffordshire) Infantry Division, but transport was scarce, and the guns had to be towed by steam lorries belonging to a flour mill. However, the progress of the regiment was so good that it was soon required to spin off a second duplicate, 73rd Medium Regiment, which absorbed a cadre of six officers and 53 trained other ranks from the 68th in January 1940. The 68th also sent drafts of trained men to other regiments, including 18 to a heavy anti-aircraft regiment in the Orkneys.

In March 1940 the regiment left 59th Division and moved to Melksham in Wiltshire to join IV Corps. It fired its guns for the first time at a practice camp at Redesdale in May. On return to Melksham the regiment was ordered to join II Corps with the BEF in France, but this was overtaken by the Dunkirk evacuation, and the regiment spent its time operating a reception area for the returned troops. 68th Medium Rgt then took part in home defence training exercises until 3 September when it received orders for the Middle East. It embarked on the SS Oropesa at Liverpool with eight 6-inch howitzers and eight new 4.5-inch guns (Note: These are reported to be 're-lined' 60-pdrs, but it is more likely that they were 4.5-inch Mk 1 guns, ie the newly designed gun barrel on a 60-pdr carriage.)and sailed on 8 October. The Oropesa berthed at Port Tewfik at Suez on 16 November, and the regiment went into camp at Almaza, near Cairo. The regiment began to prepare for service in the Sudan.

==== 234 (West Lancs) Medium Battery ====
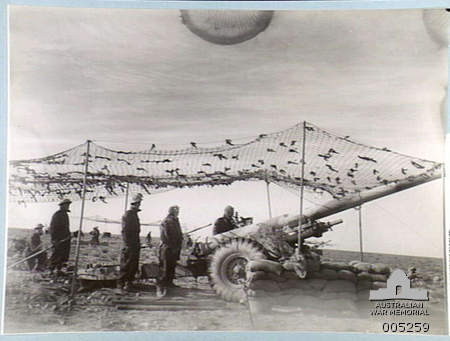
4.5-inch Mk I gun of D Trp, 234 Bty, supporting the Australians at Bardia, 24 December 1940.

On 18 December, 234 Bty was unexpectedly detached and sent with its 4.5-inch guns (at that stage the only ones in the Middle East) to the Western Desert, its vehicles still painted in Sudan camouflage. It was attached to the 60-pdrs of 7th Med Rgt for the Battle of Bardia, which opened with a surprise barrage on 3 January 1941. The long-range 4.5-inch guns were designed for CB fire and an Australian gunnery officer described the barrage: 'Then well to the rear came the frightening sound of the British 4.5-inch Long Toms and the 6-inch howitzers ... on counter-battery tasks'. 7th Medium Rgt and 234 Bty suffered a number of casualties from Italian return fire, but 6th Australian Division launched its attack and secured all its objectives and thousands of prisoners by 08.30. Phase 2 began the next day, and after three days' fighting the force had captured Bardia and 40,000 Italian prisoners.

The British force moved on rapidly to Tobruk, for the capture of which 234 Bty came under the command of 64th (London) Medium Rgt which had arrived with its own 4.5-inch battery, its 6-inch howitzer battery having joined 68th (4th West Lancs) in the Sudan. Again, the 6th Australian Division attacked (on 21 January) behind a heavy barrage with concentrations on the Italian gun positions, and the garrison surrendered on the afternoon of 22 January. Next, 234 Bty was attached to 2/1st Field Rgt, Royal Australian Artillery, as the pursuit headed for Derna and Benghazi. The battery made a fast move of 120 miles (190 km), but due to supply and road difficulties, it was still too late for the Battle of Beda Fomm. While preparing for the next bound forward to Tripoli, the battery was again unexpectedly ordered back to Cairo. Leaving its 4.5s with 7th Med Rgt, it was armed with 6-inch howitzers and attached to 64th (London) Med Rgt.

After refitting, the battery embarked as part of the reinforcements being sent to the Greek campaign. On arrival at Piraeus on 20 March, the Greek Air Force repainted the guns and vehicles in appropriate camouflage, then the battery moved north. At Kozani, the battery (less C Trp) was detached under Greek command, while the rest of 64th Med Rgt continued to Edessa. Once the German invasion began, the Greek forces blew up the road at Kozani and withdrew, so 234 Bty rejoined 64th Med Rgt covering the Florina gap at Vevi, where C Trp was firing effectively on the advancing Leibstandarte SS Adolf Hitler motorised infantry regiment. Before D Trp could get into action the regiment was ordered back behind the Aliakmon Line, where it fired a few shells, then 234 Bty with one troop of 64th Med Rgt's other battery went back via Thermopylae to the coast. Here it was ordered to destroy its guns and embark the personnel for Crete. C Troop followed later, having had a difficult journey with 64th Med Rgt under air attack, and frequently halting to return fire.

C and D Troops were reunited at Suda Bay on Crete, where a week later they were re-equipped with old Italian guns captured in North Africa: five 100 mm howitzers for C Trp and four 75 mm guns for D Trp. They were then moved by tank landing craft, to join 14th Infantry Brigade at Heraklion, with 400 rounds per gun but no transport and only enough men to work the guns and signals; the remainder of the battery stayed at Suda Bay with 64th Med Rgt. At Heraklion the battery dug gun pits and slit trenches under frequent air attack. The guns defended a perimeter, with C Trp facing west and D Trp east. A few days later one of 64th Med Rgt's troops arrived, bringing the number of guns up to 13. The German airborne assault on Crete began on 20 May. The gunners at Heraklion were able to deal with the paratroopers who landed nearby, but isolated pockets of Germans in the fields around the battery position sniped at the gunners all day and the next day, causing a few casualties until 2nd Battalion Leicestershire Regiment drove them out, supported by fire from C Trp. However, largescale parachute landings at Maleme had secured a bridgehead for the Germans, who steadily captured the rest of the island. On 25 May attacks on Heraklion from the west were neutralised with the help of artillery fire – 234 Bty firing about 500 rounds. On 28 May the gunners saw more German troops being flown in and 14th Bde was ordered to leave that night. 234 Battery's men made their way in small parties to Sphakia on the south coast and were evacuated aboard HMS Kimberley and HMS Orion. Orion was damaged by bombs on the way to Egypt, and a large number of 234 Bty were killed.

==== East Africa ====
The rest of 68th (4th West Lancs) Med Rgt (RHQ and 233 Bty) had arrived at Khartoum in the Sudan on 31 December 1940. It then moved to Gedaref and came under 5th Indian Division. On 12 January the regiment moved up to Dora and began moving sections around at night, firing a few shots and moving again, to deceive the Italians as to the number of guns facing them. Soon afterwards the Italian frontier force retreated into Eritrea and 68th Med Rgt was part of the pursuit force with 29th Indian Infantry Brigade, the first engagement occurring on 26 January. The force advanced by way of Teseney, Keru and Aicota to Barentu, which took from 30 January to 4 February to capture, then via Agordat until it reached the strong Keren position where the Italians made a stand. Shortly after arrival, 212 Bty of 64th (London) Med Rgt joined the regiment, which acted as Corps Troops supporting both 4th and 5th Indian Divisions.

The force was already engaged at Keren, having taken 'Cameron Ridge', but the Italian positions above the Dongolaas Gorge were strong and the Battle of Keren dragged on for seven weeks. 212 Battery's 60-pdrs were the most powerful and longest-ranged guns in the battle, but their flat trajectory was a disadvantage in hill country, where the 6-inch howitzers of 233 Bty were needed to reach targets behind crests. Observation from the foot of the hills was poor and cover for the guns was scarce. The regiment's RA and RCS signallers suffered heavy casualties in keeping the telephone lines open. FOOs also had heavy casualties, and in some cases had to lead attacks by infantry who had lost their officers. Obturating rings for the guns ran out, and the LAD had to improvise them from suet.

On 10 February the two batteries took part in a heavy concentration on the Sanchil–Porcuta heights, but the attack failed, as did a second concentration and attack at Acqua Col the following day. This forced a pause until reinforcements and supplies could be brought up. Meanwhile, single guns of 212 Bty were used to 'snipe' enemy mountain guns. At 07.00 on 15 March an artillery concentration on the Sanchil massif preceded a renewed attack, in which 11th Indian Infantry Brigade managed to seize Hog's Back and gain the first OP on the high ground. A night attack by 9th Indian Infantry Brigade on Fort Dologorodoc followed, with the final assault carried out among the falling 60-pdr shells. Progress towards Sanchil the following night was so slow that the infantry were left behind by their artillery barrage and the attack was called off. There were several more days of bitter fighting, but with OPs on the captured heights, Italian counter-attacks could now be destroyed by artillery fire. On 25 March the railway tunnel and gorge were forced, and by 27 March the Keren position had fallen.

==== Western Desert ====
While 233 Bty remained with the pursuit force, RHQ and 212 Bty were ordered back to Egypt with 4th Indian Division. They were sent straight into the Western Desert Campaign, taking up positions in the Bagugh Box facing the Germans at Halfaya Pass. Lieutenant-Colonel Dimoline and RHQ acted as divisional HQ RA, while 212 Bty and a detachment of 233 Bty were under 31st Field Rgt. Each night a Troop went out beyond the wire and minefields into No man's land, firing 40–50 rounds of harassing fire before returning. On 15 May Western Desert Force (WDF) launched Operation Brevity to take the pass; although 22nd Guards Brigade took its first objective it was driven off by a German counter-attack. 4th Indian Divisional HQ was nearly overrun, and the augmented 212 Bty fought a rearguard action – 'perhaps one of the few that were fought in the war by a medium battery'. The motorised infantry detailed to escort the battery back were not prepared to slow to the speed of towed medium guns, so the gunners had to use small arms. It lost two guns, but these were soon recaptured.

Shortly afterwards the regiment was sent back to rest in the Alexandria area with British Troops in Egypt. It was rejoined by 233 and 234 Btys from Eritrea and Crete, and transferred 8 x 6-inch howitzers to re-equip 211 Bty of 64th (London) Med Rgt. The regiment's main role was to lay out defences for Alexandria.

On 31 October the regiment rejoined 4th Indian Division in the WDF, now renamed Eighth Army, at Sidi Hamish. Operation Crusader began on 21 November and the division advanced to Fort Capuzzo and Sidi Omar, where it established itself among the 'Omars', a series of mounds that had previously been entrenched by the Italians. The regiment utilised the good fields of fire from this position, and 233 and 234 Btys both had their first anti-tank shoots, using 6-inch howitzers and 4.5-inch guns against Panzers. The gunners lay down as the tanks approached until at 400 yards (370 m) both batteries, a field regiment and a Bofors gun battery all opened up, destroying at least eight tanks. 234 Battery was especially vulnerable, being outside the defences, but got off the last shots as the Germans retired. After a week at the Omars, 68th Med Rgt moved up to support 2nd South African Divisions' operations against Bardia in December 1941 and January 1942, with Lt-Col Dimoline commanding a mixed artillery group consisting of his own regiment with South African and Polish field artillery. At one point 234 Bty guided by an air OP managed to sink an enemy ship at Bardia. Crusader ended when Bardia surrendered on 17 January, with the enemy driven out of Cyrenaica and the Garrison of Tobruk relieved. (Note: Farndale incorrectly identifies the medium guns fighting the Panzers at Sidi Omar as 65th Med Rgt, which was not present in the theatre.)

68th Medium Rgt was ordered into Tobruk where it dug in and wired up its OPs. During the lull following Crusader, 233 and 234 Btys were on the Gazala Line, running out sniping guns or patrolling Troops during the hours of darkness to fire on known enemy positions, but enemy CB fire was accurate and the gun positions came under frequent air attack. 233 Battery finally replaced its old 6-inch howitzers with US 155 mm guns, also of World War I vintage, but with 1,000 yards (910 m) more range. On 29 March Lt-Col Dimoline was promoted to become Commander Royal Artillery (CRA) for 4th Indian Division and was succeeded as CO by Lt-Col P.J.H. Tuck.

On 26/27 May the Axis forces launched an attack round the southern flank of Eighth Army, bringing on the confused Battle of Gazala. D Troop of 234 Bty under Captain Gillespie was sent south to reinforce one of the defensive 'boxes' south of Tobruk, which was overrun. After firing off all its ammunition D Trp got away to towards Egypt. Meanwhile, 233 and the rest of 234 Bty operated on the fringe of the fighting south of Tobruk, having to shift their positions as often as five time a day. Eventually they were drawn back into the Tobruk perimeter. The Germans attacked Tobruk on 20 June against a badly-organised defence. By the end of the day RHQ and a Troop were moved into the north-west corner of the perimeter. The following morning they were informed that the garrison had surrendered. The regiment felt that earlier warning would have allowed many to escape, as the OP parties in the perimeter were in fact able to do. The regiment destroyed its equipment and was marched off into captivity.

Lieutenants Kelly and Williams with their OP parties escaped with 3rd Battalion Coldstream Guards which broke out of the Axis encirclement and reached Egypt, where they joined D Trp. This was attached to 64th (London) Med Rgt which had lost one of its own Troops, and eventually was transferred to that regiment, taking part in the Battles of Ruweisat and Alamein. After Alamein Lt Kelly was sent to the UK with four NCOs and gunners as the cadre to reform the regiment.

==== Reformed ====
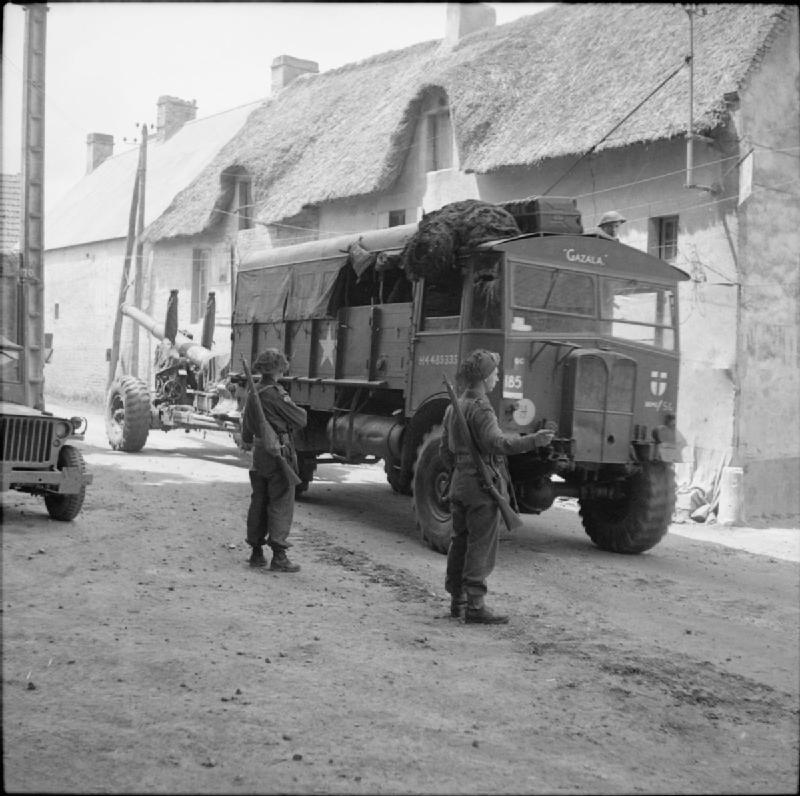
Matador gun tractor and gun from 68th Medium Regiment, Normandy, 1st July 1944. 'Gazala' has been painted onto the vehicle (IWM B6271)

68th (4th West Lancs) Medium Regiment reformed in Home Forces in February 1943 under the command of Lt-Col Maurice Jones, later Henry Dunn, with Lt Kelly promoted to captain to command C Trp and later to major to command 233 Bty. As early as July 1943 the regiment was assigned to 4 AGRA with Second Army, in 21st Army Group, and it joined the AGRA in Yorkshire in October.

In April 1944 the regiment moved into its Overlord concentration area at Colchester and at the beginning of June loaded the vehicles and guns onto two Liberty ships at Tilbury Docks. These sailed on the evening of 5 June and on 8 June (D+1) landed the reconnaissance parties. By D+3 the whole regiment was ashore with its guns positioned in support of I Corps; shortly afterwards it suffered its first casualties. As Army Troops the regiment supported most of the major offensive operations during the Normandy campaign. A particularly intense one was in support of 15th (Scottish), 49th (West Riding) and 11th Armoured Divisions towards Cheux ridge (Operation Epsom). This began with a massive barrage, after which the FOOs rode up in tanks and one was marooned in the middle of a tank battle.

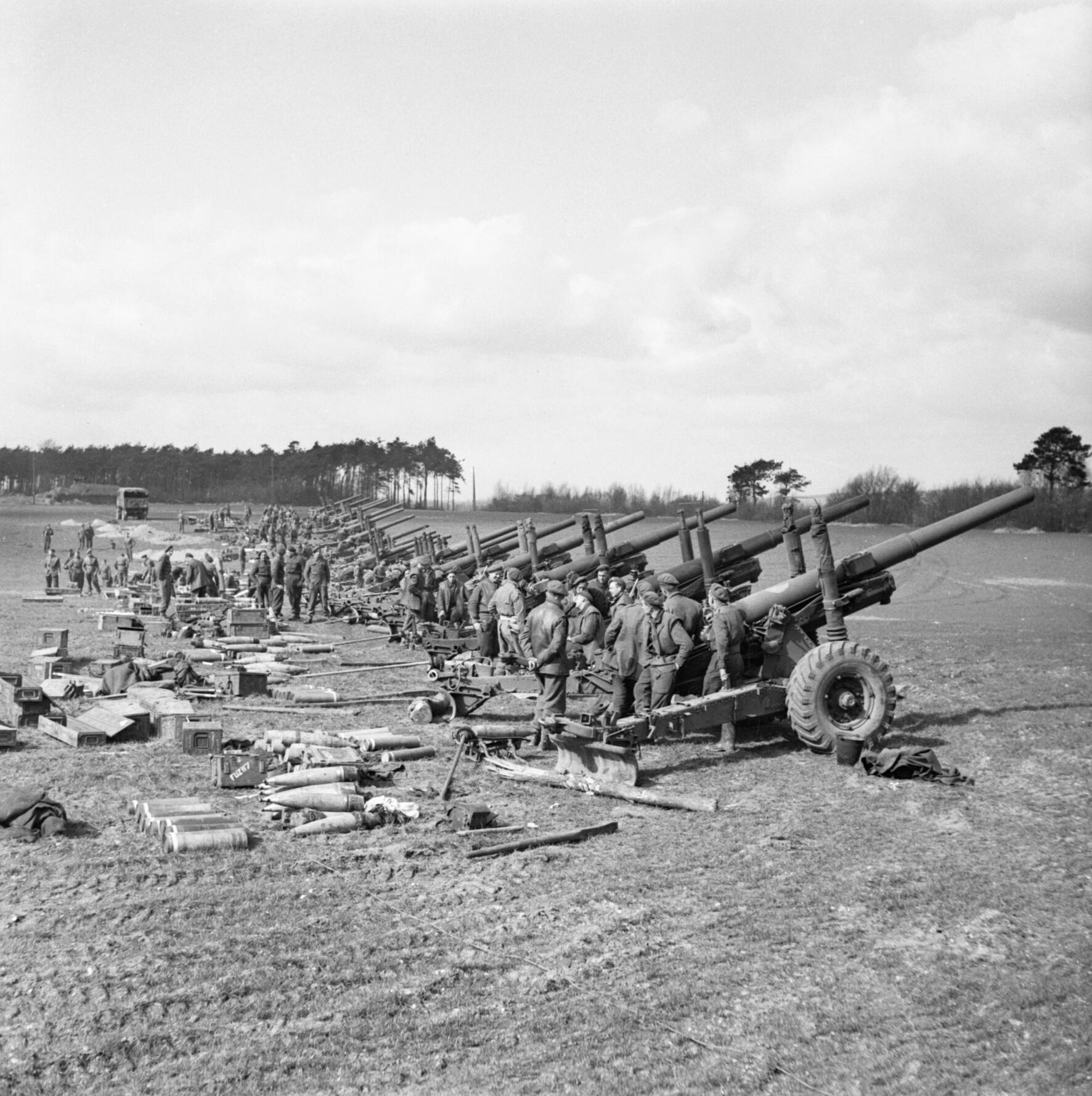
235 and 236 Medium Batteries lined up to support the Rhine crossing, 21 March 1944.

In July 1944 the regiment was allotted to First Canadian Army, fighting down towards Falaise, and then in the Canadian advance along the French coast. It took part in the capture of Le Havre (Operation Astonia), after which it was 'grounded' while all available fuel was used for 21st Army Group's dash on Brussels and Antwerp. The regiment then supported operations around the Scheldt Estuary and to the west of the Nijmegen corridor. In 1945 it continued to support First Canadian Army across the Rhine and into Northern Germany until VE Day.

68th (4th West Lancs) Medium Rgt served in the occupation forces at Osnabrück and later at Oldenburg until it was placed in suspended animation in 1946.

=== 73rd Medium Regiment ===
The regiment was formed with a large cadre from 68th (4th West Lancs) Med Rgt in January 1940, and by the autumn it was serving with its signal section in III Corps in Home Forces. In early 1941 it was in Western Command, then it was chosen as part of the reinforcements for the Middle East. It arrived in Egypt in September 1941.

On arrival it was converted into 95th Anti-Tank Regiment, equipped with 2-pounder A/T guns and organised into A, B, C and D batteries rather than the two batteries of a medium regiment.

==== 'A' Battery in Burma ====
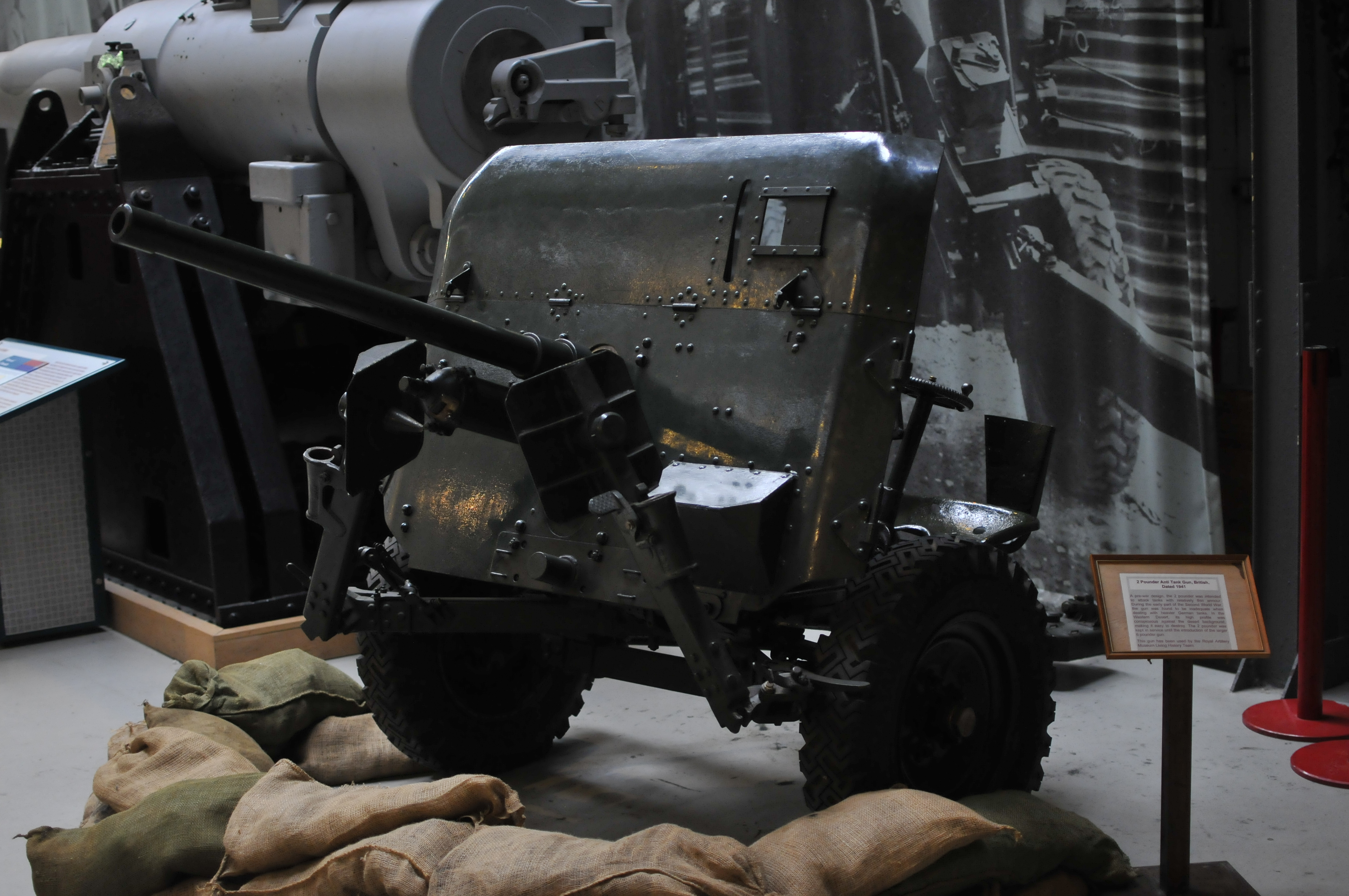
2-pdr Anti-tank gun preserved at the RA Museum.

On 26 December 1941, following the Japanese invasion of Malaya, Prime Minister Winston Churchill ordered Gen Auchinleck to send an armoured brigade to the Far East. Auchinleck sent 7th Armoured Brigade Group, including A Bty, 95th A/T Rgt, under Maj R.A. Hemelryk with three Troops each of four 2-pdr guns. The brigade group could not leave Port Suez until the end of January 1942 and was intended for Java, but that island was captured by the Japanese before it was due to arrive in March. Instead it sailed via Ceylon and landed at Rangoon in Burma on 21 February.

The brigade reached the front just after the disastrous Battle of Sittang Bridge (17–23 February), and deployed around Thanatpin, Payagyi and Waw. By 27 February the Japanese were across the Sittang, and the brigade was pulled back to cover the Rangoon–Pegu road at Tharrawaddy. A counter-attack retook Pegu, but on 6 March the brigade was forced back into Pegu, and then formed the rearguard as Rangoon was burned and the British force retired northwards to Tharrawaddy on 9–10 March. There was bitter fighting round Magwe in March. On 19 March Burma Corps ('Burcorps') was formed, with A Bty becoming corps troops. The retreat continued to Prome and then Mandalay, with rearguard actions along the route. On 27 April the Japanese forces closed up to 7th Armoured Bde, which was at Meiktila, covering the retreat of 17th Indian Division across the Ava Bridge at Mandalay. A Battery 'dealt with the few Japanese tanks which were foolish enough to expose themselves', as the 1/7th and 2/5th Gurkha Rifles held off numerous attacks. The force withdrew across the Irrawaddy on the night of 28/29 April. By 3 May the brigade was covering the withdrawal towards Yeu, and finally the remains of Burcorps crossed the Chindwin to safety at Shwegyin during the night of 11/12 May after the rearguard artillery had fired off all their ammunition and destroyed their guns.

7th Armoured Brigade was sent back to India to rest and reorganise. In August it was ordered to Iraq, where it was to join a new Persia and Iraq Command (Paiforce). On 23 September A Bty sailed for Basra. It left 7th Armoured Brigade on 20 November, and finally returned to its regiment in the Suez Canal Zone in March 1943.

==== Italy ====
95th Anti-Rank Rgt spent most of 1943 and early 1944 with Ninth Army in Palestine, but by mid-1944 it had reverted to its old role and title as 73rd Medium Rgt in Middle East Forces. By October it was serving in Italy with Eighth Army.

73rd Medium Rgt was disbanded in September 1945

=== Prisoners of war ===
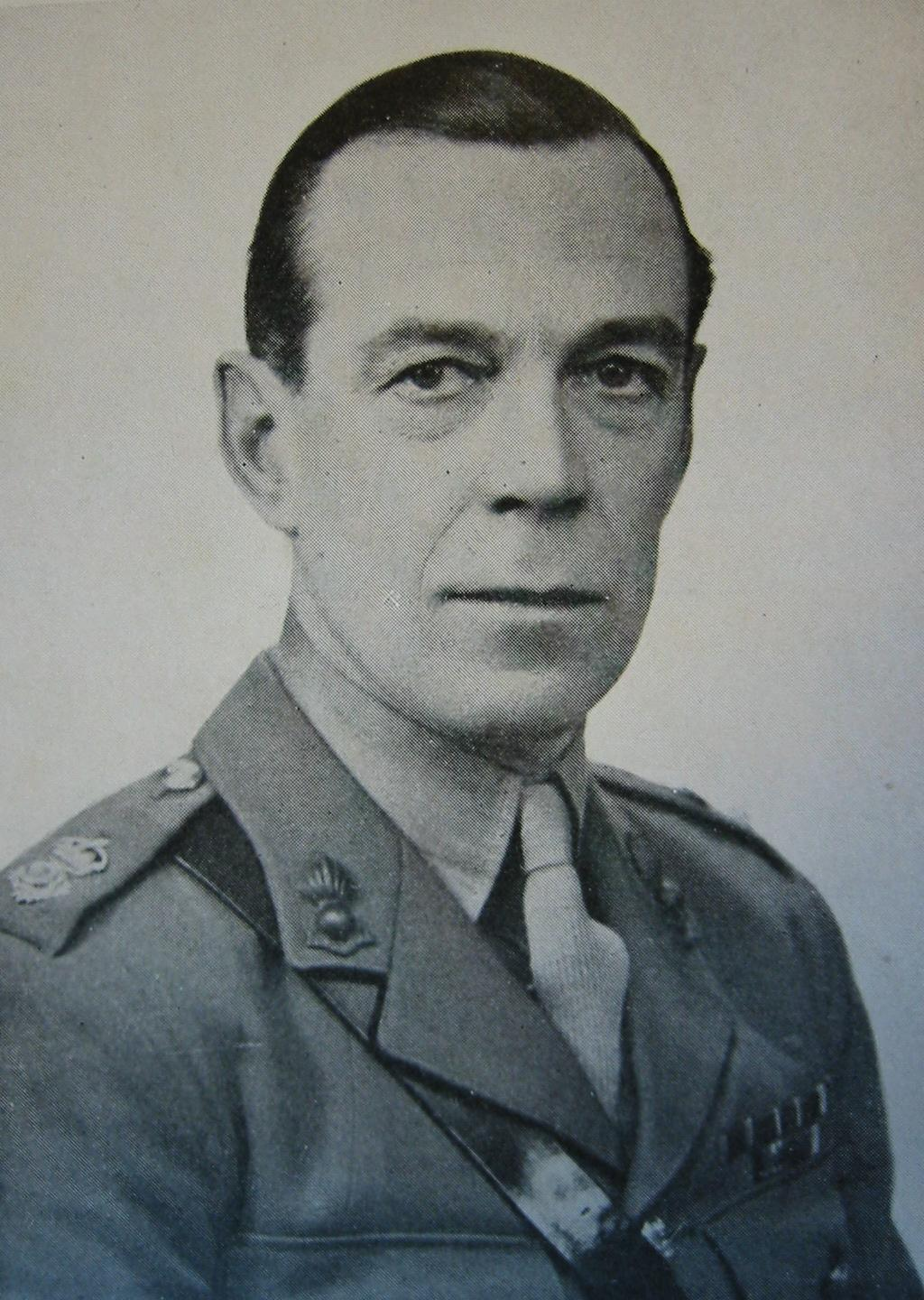
Lt-Col (later Brig Sir) Philip Toosey

Major Philip Toosey, OC 236 Bty in the King's Cup and during the Battle of France, who then trained 902 Home Defence Bty, was second-in-command of 59th Med Rgt in 1941 when he was selected to command 135th (Hertfordshire Yeomanry) Field Rgt in 18th Division. The CRA of the division was 59th Rgt's former CO, Brigadier Servaes. 18th Division was sent to the Far East and was captured at the Fall of Singapore. Toosey became famous for his efforts to relieve the sufferings of the prisoners building bridges on the Burma Railway (later fictionalised in the film The Bridge on the River Kwai). Postwar he commanded 368th Med Rgt and 87 AGRA, and became Brigadier Sir Philip Toosey, DSO. After his death in 1975 the TA barracks on Aigburth Road in Liverpool were named in his honour.

Gunner Laurence Holmes of 68th Med Rgt was captured at Tobruk and sent to a PoW camp in Italy. He made five unsuccessful attempts to escape before the Allied invasion of Italy, when the Italian government signed an Armistice and the Italian PoW guards began to desert. On 13 September 1943 Gnr Holmes and some comrades broke out and tried to make their way to the coast. Hearing that the Allies had reached the Sangro, they turned south to try to join them, but were captured by a German patrol, on the north bank of the river on 26 November. On 28 February 1944 Holmes and a comrade broke out from a moving train but were captured the following day by armed Fascists. On 3 March Holmes and two other made another break from a train, but were picked up on the outskirts of Rome, after which he was sent to PoW camps in Germany. Holmes made his ninth and last escape on 9 March 1945 from a PoW column being marched from Nuremberg to Munich. Together with six companions he hid in a haystack and they reached American lines a few days later. Holmes was awarded the Military Medal (MM) for his efforts.

== Postwar ==
When the TA was reconstituted in 1947, both 4th West Lancs regiments were reformed:

- 359 (4th West Lancs) Medium Regiment at The Grange, under the command of Lt-Col J.D.R.T. Tilney
- 368 (4th West Lancs) Medium Regiment at Upper Warwick Street, Liverpool, under the command of Lt-Col Philip Toosey.

Both regiments were in 87 AGRA, the former HQ RA, 55th (West Lancashire) Division) based in Liverpool and commanded by Brigadier D.I. Crawford, 59th Med Rgt's former CO. In 1949 Lt-Col Toosey was promoted to command 87 AGRA, which position he held until 1954.

In 1949, 359 Med Rgt began rebuilding its crumbling drill hall at The Grange, and the new building was opened in 1953. In 1955, 368 Med Rgt absorbed 533 (Liverpool Welsh) Heavy Anti-Aircraft Rgt, which became Q (Liverpool Welsh) Med Bty. Then on 31 October 1956, 359 and 368 merged as 359 (4th West Lancs) Med Rgt. 87 AGRA was disbanded on 1 May 1961, and some of its personnel were incorporated into 359 Med Rgt.

When the TA was reduced into the TAVR in 1967, the regiment merged with 287 (1st West Lancashire) Fd Rgt, 5th Bn King's Regiment (Liverpool) and 1st Bn Liverpool Scottish, to form:

The West Lancashire Regiment

- RHQ & Q Bty (4th West Lancashire) – from 359 Med Rgt
- P Bty (1st West Lancashire) – from 287 Fd Rgt
  - A Troop (Lancashire Hussars)
  - B Troop (Liverpool Rifles)
- R Bty (The King's) – from 5th King's
  - G Troop (The Liverpool Scottish) – from 1st Liverpool Scottish

However, in 1969 the West Lancashire Regiment was reduced to a cadre sponsored by 103 (Lancashire Artillery Volunteers) Light Air Defence Rgt, with part of Q (4th West Lancs) Bty absorbed into 59 (West Lancashire) Signal Squadron, 33 (Lancashire and Cheshire) Signal Regiment. In 1973 the remaining cadre was absorbed into 208 (3rd West Lancs) Bty of 103 (LAV) Rgt.

== Uniform and insignia ==
55th Division's Red Rose badge

The 600 original Volunteers who marched through Liverpool in November 1859 wore civilian clothes with a red and blue Cockade on the chest. Their first official uniform was a blue Shell jacket with scarlet facings and blue trousers with a red stripe, the headdress being an artillery Busby. The Lancashire AVCs all seem to have worn the same badge on the 'bomb'-shaped busby plume holder and waistbelt clasp: this consisted of a cannon with a pile of cannonballs to the left and a Lancashire rose above, surrounded by a circle bearing the words 'LANCASHIRE VOLUNTEER ARTILLERY' (see above).

All ranks are reported to have worn a Red Rose of Lancaster badge in the 1930s (this was probably the 55th (West Lancashire) Division shoulder patch). From ca 1963 the regiment was authorised to wear as an arm badge the Red Rose with green stem and leaves on a khaki square (formerly the formation badge of 55th (West Lancashire) Division and then of 87 AGRA).

== Commanding officers ==
The following served as commanding officer of 4th Lancashire Artillery Volunteers and its successor units:

- Lt-Col James Bourne, 1860
- Maj George Melly, 1863
- Lt-Col T.A. Bushby, 1867
- Lt-Col Henry H. Hornby, 1869
- Maj James Walter, 1873
- Lt-Col W.M. Belcher, 1874 and 1881
- Capt Sam Lett, 1876
- Maj William Turner, 1877
- Lt-Col A.F. Braun, 1896
- Lt-Col J.G. Williams, 1898
- Lt-Col H.M. Melly, 1900
- Lt-Col Albert Melly, VD, 1906
- Lt-Col S.Heywood Melly, TD, 1914
- Lt-Col S.P. Morter, DSO, TD, 1916

59th and 359

- Lt-Col E.V. Hemelryk, DSO, TD, 1921
- Lt-Col A.C. Tod, OBE, TD, 1925
- Lt-Col L.M. Synge, TD, 1929
- Lt-Col V.E. Cotton, OBE, TD, 1933
- Lt-Col H.C. Servaes, TD, 1936
- Lt-Col D.I. Crawford, 1940
- Lt-Col G.F. Lushington, 1945
- Lt-Col J.D.R.T. Tilney, TD, 1947
- Lt-Col A.I. Crawford, MC, TD, 1949
- Lt-Col C.H. Elston, TD, 1952
- Lt-Col A.S. Eccles, MBE, TD, 1956 (from 368th)
- Lt-Col H.D. Beazley, TD, 1957

68th and 368

- Lt-Col H.K. Dimoline, DSO, MBE, TD, 1939
- Lt-Col P.J.H. Tuck, 1942
- Lt-Col M. Jones, 1943
- Lt-Col H.Dunn, DSO, TD, 1944
- Lt-Col P.D. Toosey, DSO, OBE, TD, 1947
- Lt-Col J.M. Harrison, TD, 1949
- Lt-Col N.A.H. Kitchener, OBE, TD, 1952
- Lt-Col A.S. Eccles, MBE, TD, 1955

== Honorary colonels ==
The following served as honorary colonel of the unit:

- 1867–74: Col James Bourne, former CO
- 1874–96: Col Henry H. Hornby, one of the original officers and former CO
- 1896–1914: Col W.M. Belcher, VD, former CO
- 1914–17: Lt-Gen Edward Bethune, CVO, CB, former GOC West Lancashire Division
- 1920–42: Lt-Gen Sir Hugh Jeudwine, KCB, KBE, TD, former GOC 55th (West Lancashire) Division
- 1939–55 (68th/368): Col Sir Alan Tod, CBE, TD, former CO
- 1951–56 (359): Brig D.I. Crawford, CB, DSO, TD, former CO
- 1955–? (359): Brig H.C. Servaes, TD, the first new officer commissioned after World War I, and CO 1936–39
- 1965 (359 and West Lancs Rgt): Brig Sir Philip Toosey, CBE, DSO, TD

== Memorials ==
The regiment's World War I memorial to the 1st, 2nd and 3rd Lines of the 4th West Lancs (How) Brigade and No 4 Section West Lancs DAC was unveiled at The Grange in 1922. A World War II Memorial was later added. Both memorials were moved to Brigadier Philip Toosey Barracks in 1980.

On 14 October 1951 the Liverpool Group of Royal Artillery Memorial Homes for disabled gunners were opened in Allerton Road. One of these houses, named The Grange, was paid for by former members of 59th and 68th Med Rgts, and another, Collerton, in memory of Maj W.K. Crawford was paid for by his former employers.

== External Sources ==
- Mark Conrad, The British Army, 1914 (archive site)
- British Artillery in World War 2
- Imperial War Museum, War Memorials Register
- Lancashire Record Office, Handlist 72
- The Long, Long Trail
- Orders of Battle at Patriot Files
- The Regimental Warpath 1914–1918 (archive site)
- Land Forces of Britain, the Empire and Commonwealth – Regiments.org (archive site)
- Royal Artillery 1939–1945
- Graham Watson, The Territorial Army 1947
- British Army units from 1945 on
