= Adel Souto =

American writer and musician

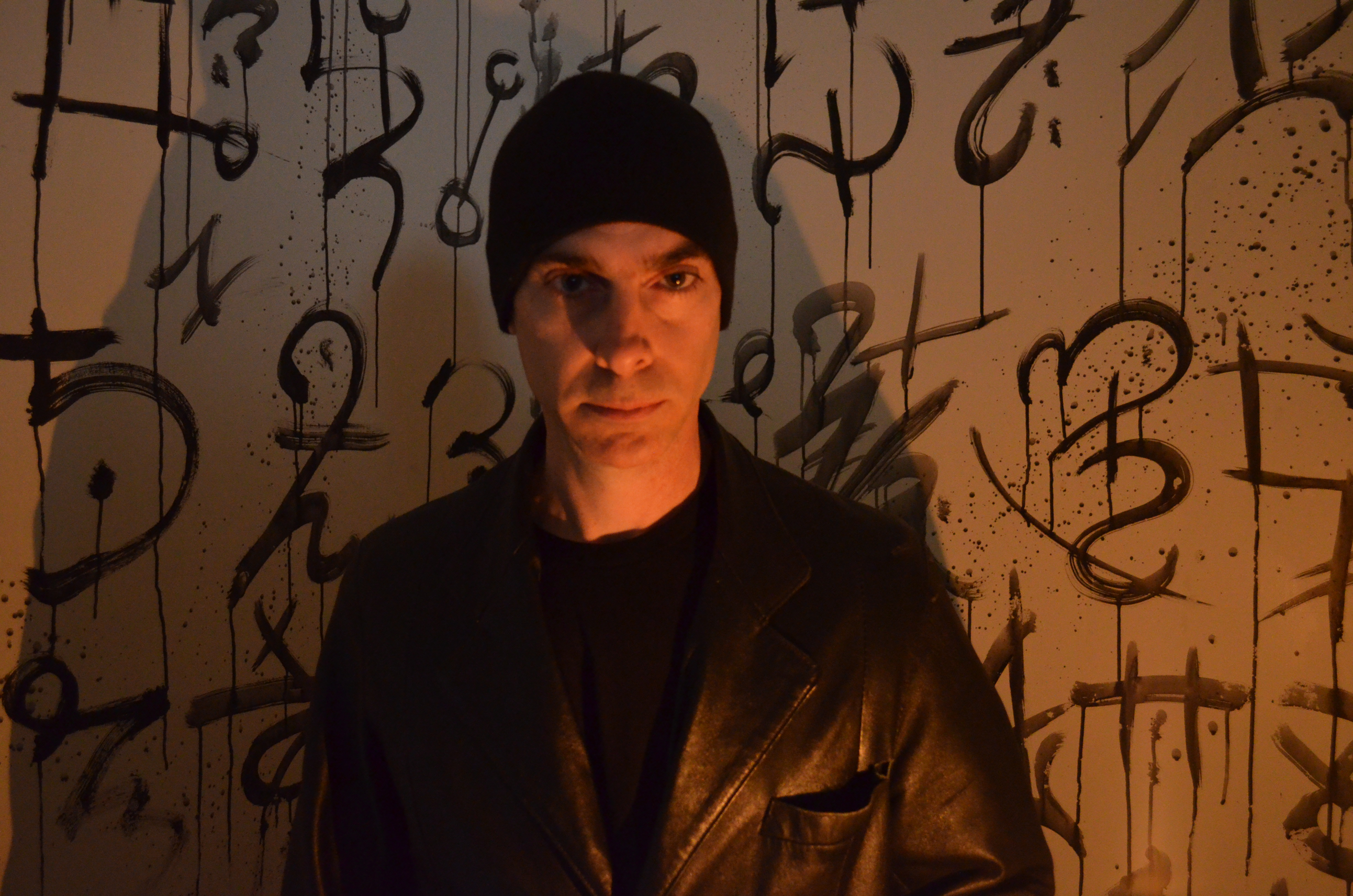
- Born: November 29, 1969 (age 56); Havana, Cuba
- Other name: Adel 156
- Known for: Writer, musician

Adel Souto (born November 29, 1969), who took the stage name "Adel 156" in 1990, is an American writer and musician. He is best known for his fanzine-turned-website Feast of Hate and Fear and the metalcore outfit Timescape Zero.

== Early life ==
Adel Souto was born in Havana, Cuba, in 1969 to Mariaestela and Arsenio Souto. After his birth, his parents moved back to Spain until Francisco Franco left power in 1975, at which time the family moved to the United States. Souto went to high school at Hialeah-Miami Lakes Senior High. He attended some college courses at Miami-Dade Community College, but quickly dropped out.

== Creative work ==
=== Music ===
In 1985, Souto formed Gangbangang (no releases), playing bass, and later joined Mourning Breath (no releases), still on bass, while in Miami. Adel replaced the original vocalist in Miami's first straight edge band, Violent Deed, in 1987 (one cassette demo, one live demo). In 1991, he began an experimental noise project in Denver named Dääb-Soul Destruction (one cassette demo). Upon returning to Miami, he replaced the vocalist for Hangman, in 1992, changing their name to Timescape Zero (two cassette demos, one split 7-inch, and two LPs).

He formed Shroud in 1992 as an improvisational jazz-doom-punk outfit (one cassette demo / repressed on CD, and one bootleg 7-inch). He joined metalcore sludge band None Dare Call It Treason, on vocals, in 2001 (one CDr demo). He began Martini Kulture as an experimental tape collage project in 2003 (one CDr demo). Souto joined Sound 4 Sound from 2003 to 2007, and again in 2009 (three CDr demos). He has contributed vocals to a track on DNME's Last of A Dying Breed LP, and played drums on The Goslings’ Grandeur of Hair LP and Hunter's Moon EP.

Adel currently plays in the industrial junkyard outfit 156 (one CD EP, four cassette EPs), which released a 10-inch EP in 2016, titled Memento Mori, where the music was made entirely out of human bones, such as skulls, femur, and Tibetan kangling.

=== Discography ===
- Violent Deed – self-titled, cassette demo (1988)
- Dääb-Soul Destruction – "God Killing Himself: Volume One”, cassette demo (1991)
- Timescape Zero – “Welcome to the Kaliyuga”, cassette demo (1992)
- Shroud – “Suicide Mission”, cassette demo (1992), 7-inch EP (bootleg, 1993), CD repress (2011)
- Timescape Zero – “Life In Sodom”, cassette demo (1993)
- Timescape Zero / Subliminal Criminal – split 7-inch EP (1993)
- Timescape Zero – “Born With the Fear of Dreaming”, 12-inch LP and cassette LP (1994)
- Timescape Zero – “Total War”, CD LP (1997)
- None Dare Call It Treason – “Preparing for the Quiet Wars”, CDr demo (2002)
- Martini Kulture – “God Killing Himself: Volume Two”, CD EP (2003)
- Sound 4 Sound – self-titled, CDr demo (2004)
- Sound 4 Sound – “The Rat Bastard Recordings”, CDr demo (2005)
- The Goslings – “Hunter’s Moon”, CDr EP (2005)
- The Goslings – “Grandeur of Hair”, CD LP (2005)
- 156 – self-titled, CD EP (2010)
- 156 – “Frontyard / Backyard”, cassette EP (2012)
- 156 – “Eight Steps In the Dance”, cassette EP (2012)
- 156 – “My Deed Is Love”, CDr EP w/ DVDr (2012)
- 156 – "A Life Lived As If In Hell", cassette EP (2013)
- 156 – "Taking A Look At A Moment Lost", cassette EP (2013)
- 156 – "Memento Mori", 10-inch vinyl EP (2016)
- 156 – "The Beehive Suite", 5×7″ one song postcard record (2019)
- 156 – "Music For the Bardo", 7-inch vinyl EP (2020)
- 156 - "The Art of Dying: The Complete Memento Mori Sessions", CD LP (2023)

=== Writing ===
Souto began writing for his own fanzine in 1987, with his first being Evolution (one issue, dedicated to the punk and hardcore music scene, complete with band interviews), and later the more occult-oriented work, To the Left (1988 – 1990, four issues). In 1990, he began publishing the fanzine-turned-magazine Feast of Hate and Fear, which became the FHF website in 2001.

Since 1992, Adel has written for several magazines, including Maximumrockandroll, and Psychology Today. He has also been published in the first volume of the Antibothis anthologies. He has published We Shall Not Celebrate the Death of the White God (a translation of a work by Chilean poet Miguel Serrano) and a collection of Feast of Hate and Fear articles titled Some Words.

In 2014, he released a limited-edition art book on a 30-day vow of silence, titled The Least Silent of Men, and, in 2015, released a chapbook of his "throwaway poems", titled Throne Out.

In 2021, Souto released a collection of articles touring New York City odd spots and morbid sites, titled This Hidden City. The book collected 63 entries, covering all five boroughs, mentioning over 200 landmarks, complete with photos, and maps. Two years later, he released a compendium based on his Know-It-All blog, covering over 300 bizarre true stories in the fields of art, music, literature, hoaxes, religion, and lifestyles. The book's cover was designed by drummer Chuck Loose.

=== Bibliography ===
- We Shall Not Celebrate... (by Miguel Serrano – 2009, Souto served as English translator)
- Some Words: The Best of Feast of Hate and Fear Fanzine (2010)
- Schizotypal (2011)
- The Least Silent of Men (2014)
- Throne Out (2015)
- This Hidden City; A Tour of New York City's Esoteric Side (2021)
- Encyclopedia Obscurum (2023)

=== Photography ===
Souto has also released several books and fanzines containing his photography from 2011 through 2020

- Ready For War (a collection of his battle jacket photography, 2018)
- Ready For War: The Florida Edition (a collection of his battle jacket photography from his home state of Florida, 2019)
- Ad Removal As Modern Art (a collection of photographs of unintentional artwork created by the destruction of advertisements, 2020)
- Forgotten Rides (a collection of photographs of unintentional artwork created by the abandonment of bicycles, 2023)

=== Film ===
- A Female Sacrifice (2007) – short film shot on a cellphone to help quit smoking.
- Four Throwaways (2012) – short film documenting four of Souto's free poems, which he called “throwaways”.
- Where Even Fools Often Fear to Tread (2012) – short film in homage to the NYC subway system.
- Staring At the Ground (2012) – short film used to show the ubiquity of advertising.
- Max Neuhaus' Times Square (2012) – short documentary on the Times Square sound installation by Max Neuhaus.
- Video montages for Robert Turman, Jason Lascalleet, The Waterford Landing, as well as his musical project 156.
- Acted in the short film Consumption of the Heart by Dayton, Ohio underground film maker Andy Copp.

=== Television ===
- Adel appeared four times on the Miami TV show, Kenneth's Frequency, on WAMI-DT 69.
- Adel filmed a TV show for Brooklyn public access in 2011 called Brooklyn's Alright… If You Like Saxophones, which airs on BCAT, Brooklyn Public Access, and is currently in season two.
