= Timescape Zero =

- Origin: Miami, Florida
- Genres: Metalcore, hardcore punk
- Years active: 1991–1998
- Labels: X-Ray Records, Feast of Hate and Fear

Timescape Zero is an American metalcore band from Miami formed in 1991. They are seen as one of the lesser known bands which helped start the metalcore scene. The band formed after the break-up of Hangman (who released only one song on a 7-inch compilation on Youthbus Records), when they replaced the original lead singer with Adel Souto of Feast of Hate and Fear fanzine. Lyrical themes include social issues, religion, politics, mental illness, individualism and self-awareness. Their influences include late 80s straight edge hardcore, Sheer Terror, Killing Time, Sick of It All, Vision, Charles Manson and Anton LaVey.

They broke up in 1998 but played reunion shows in 2004 and again in 2010.

== Discography ==
- Welcome to the Kaliyuga - Demo cassette - 1991
- Life in Sodom - Demo cassette - 1992
- split 7-inch with Subliminal Criminal on Feast of Hate and Fear - 1993
- Born with the Fear of Dreaming - 12-inch LP on Hefty Records / cassette on Feast of Hate and Fear - 1994
- Total War - CD on X-Ray Records - 1997 / re-released on Feast of Hate and Fear - 2001
- Everything Short of Total War (early years discography) - CD - 2004
