= Feast of Hate and Fear =

Feast of Hate and Fear was a print fanzine from 1990 through 1998. The fanzine contained articles on subjects such as social and political issues to film, books and the music scene. It also ran many pirated comics, and republished rare and out-of-print (though copyrighted) material, with the usual underground music, video and fanzine reviews, plus the cut-n-paste artwork and layout found in so many desktop published zines of the late 1970s through today.

Feast of Hate and Fear was created by Miami, Florida local, and vocalist for the metalcore outfit Timescape Zero, Adel Souto. FHF began in 1990, after two earlier fanzines (Evolution, 1987, and To the Left, 1987–1989) gained him a bit of press in other fanzines such as Maximum RocknRoll and Flipside. Though he officially brought Feast of Hate and Fear to a halt in 1998, its last printed issue was released in 1997.

In 2001, Souto opted to place much of what was in the fanzine on the internet. The Feast of Hate and Fear website holds a huge virtual library of rare texts and manifestos, many - though not all - of Souto's original FHF, as well as newer articles, plus current music and DVD reviews, free outsider music downloads and the Ever-Increasing Interview Project, which is an ongoing project to get as many people involved in film and music to answer the same ten philosophical questions.

Issues of the original print fanzines can be found in the Austin Zine Library as well as the New York City Fanzine Museum Collective (NYCFMC).

== Issues ==
- Issue 1 (1990) 100 copies
- Issue 2 (1992) 300 copies
- Issue 3 (1993) 500 copies, came with Timescape Zero / Subliminal Criminal split 7-inch record
- Issue 4 (1994) 500 copies
- Issue 5 (1995) lost by contracted printer, never issued
- Issue 6 (1996) 1000 copies
- Issue 7 (1997) 1000 copies
- Issue 8 (1998) designed, but never issued
