= Gosselin =

Gosselin is a surname. Notable people with the surname include:

- Béatrice Gosselin (born 1958), French politician
- Constance Gosselin (1793-?), French ballet dancer, sister of Geneviève
- David Gosselin (born 1977), Canadian ice hockey player
- Derrick Gosselin (born 1956), Belgian aristocrat, engineer and economist
- Geneviève Gosselin (1791–1818), French ballet dancer, the first ballerina who raised on pointes
- Jean-François Gosselin (born 1975), Canadian politician
- Jon Gosselin (born 1977), American television personality
- Juliette Gosselin (born 1991), Canadian actress
- Kate Gosselin (born 1975), American television personality
- Lisa Gosselin, American politician
- Mario Gosselin (hockey player) (born 1963), Canadian ice hockey player
- Mario Gosselin (racecar driver) (born 1971), Canadian racecar driver
- Martin Gosselin (1847–1905), British aristocrat and diplomat
- Nathalie Gosselin (born 1966), Canadian judoka
- Nicholas Gosselin (died 1917), British military officer and intelligence agent
- Phil Gosselin, baseball player
- Robert Gosselin (1951–2023), American politician
- Simon Gosselin (born 1988), French-Canadian drag queen
- Théodore Gosselin aka G. Lenotre (1855–1935), French historian
- YaYa Gosselin (born 2009), American actress

== See also ==
- Gosling, a similar-sounding English surname
