= Mario Gosselin =

Mario Gosselin may refer to:

- Mario Gosselin (ice hockey) (born 1963), Canadian former ice hockey goaltender
- Mario Gosselin (racing driver) (born 1971), Canadian racing driver

== See also ==
- Mario (disambiguation)
- Gosselin (disambiguation)
