= Harry Dimoline =

Brigadier Harry Dimoline CBE DSO TD CPM
- Born: 6 September 1903; Wallasey, Cheshire, England
- Died: 15 November 1972 (aged 69); Mere, Wiltshire, England
- Relatives: Major General William Dimoline (brother)
- Military career
- Allegiance: United Kingdom
- Branch: Territorial Army
- Service years: 1921–1951
- Rank: Brigadier
- Service number: 22420
- Commands: Royal Artillery, 17th Indian Infantry Division (1944–1945); Royal Artillery, 47th (London) Infantry Division (1944); Royal Artillery, 4th Indian Infantry Division (1942–1944); 68th (4th West Lancashire) Medium Regiment (1939–1942)
- Conflicts: Second World War: East African Campaign; North African campaign; Italian Campaign; Burma campaign
- Awards: Commander of the Order of the British Empire; Distinguished Service Order; Territorial Decoration; Colonial Police Medal; Mentioned in Despatches (3)

Brigadier Harry Kenneth Dimoline, CBE, DSO, TD, CPM (6 September 1903 – 15 November 1972) was an officer in the Royal Artillery during the Second World War and a police officer in Malaya during the Malayan Emergency.

== Second World War ==
A part-time officer in the 59th (4th West Lancashire) Medium Brigade, Royal Artillery of the Territorial Army (TA) during the 1920s and 1930s, Dimoline had risen to be second-in-command of the regiment by 1939. He was then charged with raising and commanding a duplicate regiment as the TA rapidly expanded just before the outbreak of the Second World War. He commanded the 68th (4th West Lancashire) Medium Regiment at the Battle of Keren in East Africa and then in the Western Desert. In March 1942 he was promoted to Commander, Royal Artillery (CRA) in 4th Indian Infantry Division, serving with it in North Africa, Tunisia and Italy; he was also acting commander of the 4th Indian Division during the Second Battle of Monte Cassino. He then served as CRA with 47th (London) Infantry Division in the United Kingdom before taking up the same role with 17th Indian Infantry Division in Burma.

== Post-war ==
Dimoline served as Honorary superintendent Auxiliary Police, Federation of Malaya, during the Malayan Emergency.

== Career summary ==
- Commissioned into 59th (4th West Lancashire) Medium Brigade, Royal Garrison Artillery, Territorial Army as second lieutenant (19 October 1921)
- Promoted lieutenant (19 October 1923)
- Promoted captain (1 July 1926), initially a provisional rank, later confirmed
- Promoted major (29 May 1931)
- Promoted lieutenant colonel commanding 68th (4th West Lancashire) Medium Regiment, RA (5 May 1939)
- Commander Royal Artillery 4th Indian Division, North Africa – Italy (1942–1944)
- Acting major general (6 February 1944 – 9 March 1944)
- Acting General Officer Commanding 4th Indian Division, Italy (1944)
- Commander Royal Artillery 47th (London) Infantry Division (1944)
- Commander Royal Artillery 17th Indian Infantry Division, Burma (1944–1945)
- Substantive colonel (11 April 1945)
- Supernumerary colonel and honorary brigadier (20 December 1945)
- Transfer to Territorial Army Reserve of Officers (13 February 1951)
- Retired (6 September 1961)

== Personal ==
Dimoline was educated at Sedbergh School and his elder brother was Major General William Dimoline.
