= John Gosling =

John Gosling may refer to:

- John Gosling (The Kinks musician) (1948–2023), British keyboardist in The Kinks
- John Gosling (Psychic TV musician) (born 1963), British big beat and industrial musician
- John Gosling (cricketer, born 1833) (1833–1882), English cricketer
- John Gosling (cricketer, born 1921) (1921–1994), Fijian cricketer
- John A. Gosling (1928–2004), American conductor of classical music
- John T. Gosling (1938–2018), American physicist
