= Nicholas Gosselin =

Irish military officer and intelligence agent

- Born: 12 February 1839; Plymouth, Devon, England
- Died: 4 February 1917 (aged 77); West Malling, Kent, England
- Occupations: Military officer, Intelligence agent
- Known for: Leading the newly formed Special Irish Branch for British Home Office

Major Sir Nicholas Gosselin (12 February 1839 – 4 February 1917) was an Irish military officer and intelligence agent.

== Life ==
Gosselin was born in Plymouth, Devon, the second son of Major Nicholas Gosselin of County Cavan, Ireland. He entered the British Army at the age of 16, serving in the 39th (Dorsetshire) Regiment of Foot and the Royal Welch Fusiliers before becoming the adjutant of the Cavan Militia.

He was appointed a resident magistrate in the West of Ireland 1882. In May 1883, he was seconded to the Home Office and given control of the newly formed Special Irish Branch, with the initial remit of gathering intelligence on Fenian organisations operating in Glasgow and northern England.

He remained nominally a magistrate during his time at the Home Office – described officially as "employment on special duty" – but did not carry out any of the associated duties nor was he paid for the post. He retired in 1904 and died in West Mailing, Kent, aged 77.

== Family ==
On 2 Feb 1865 he married Catherine Rebecca 'Kate' Haslett, eldest daughter of William Haslett, Esquire, J.P. Londonderry and of Carrownaffe Lodge, Moville.
