= Rose Goslinga =

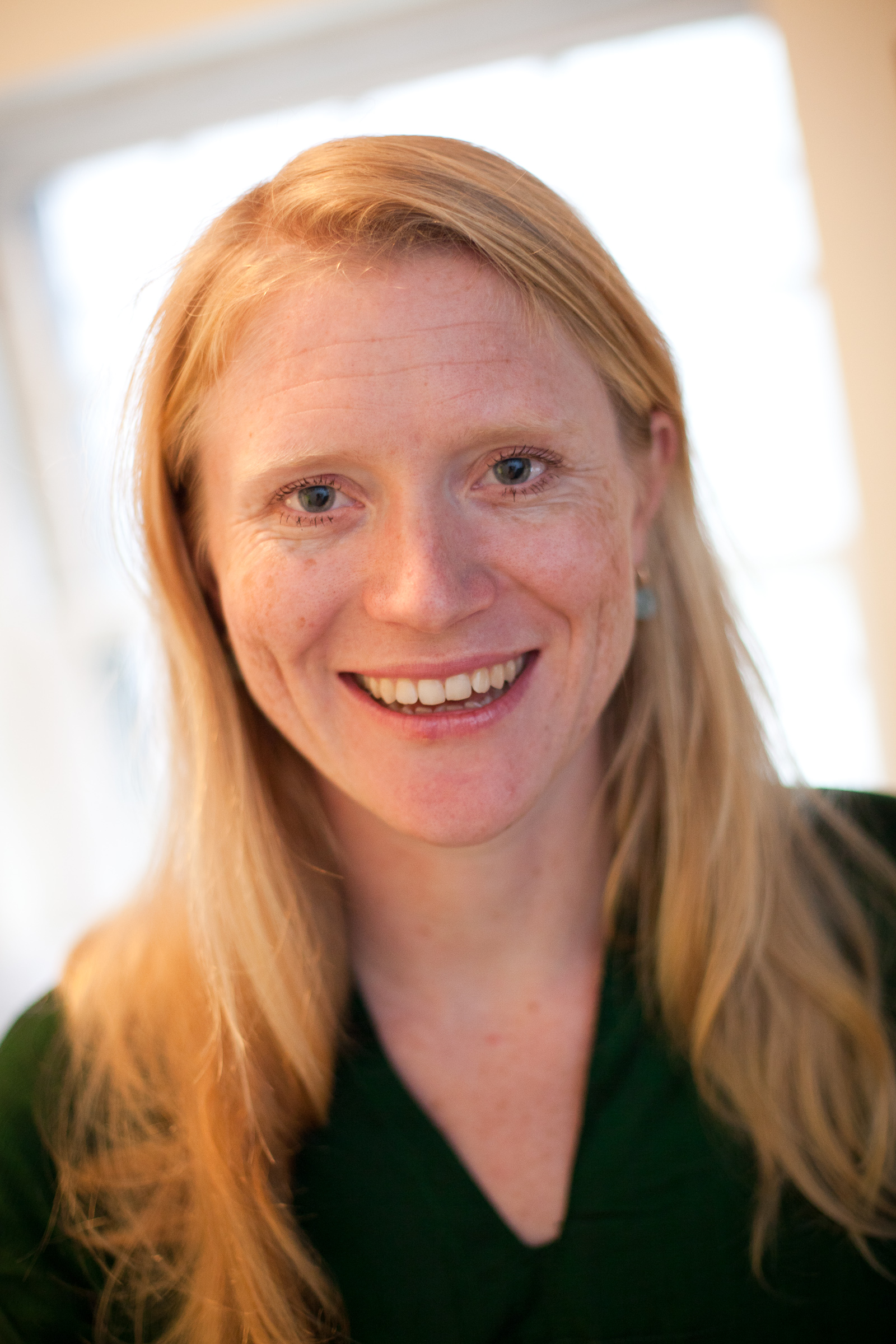

Rose Goslinga is a microinsurer and advocate for creating insurance for small-scale farmers in Africa. Goslinga led the development of the Syngenta Foundation's Kilmo Salam (Swahili for "safe farming) program which provides lost cost insurance to nearly 200,000 farmers in Kenya and Rwanda. In 2012, Goslinga became a fellow at the Mulago Foundation.

Goslinga founded Pula Advisors in 2015, an insurance advisory service for African farmers. Pula works in eight countries, supporting programs in Kenya, Rwanda, Uganda, Nigeria, Ethiopia, and Malawi.
