= William W. Gosling =

English painter

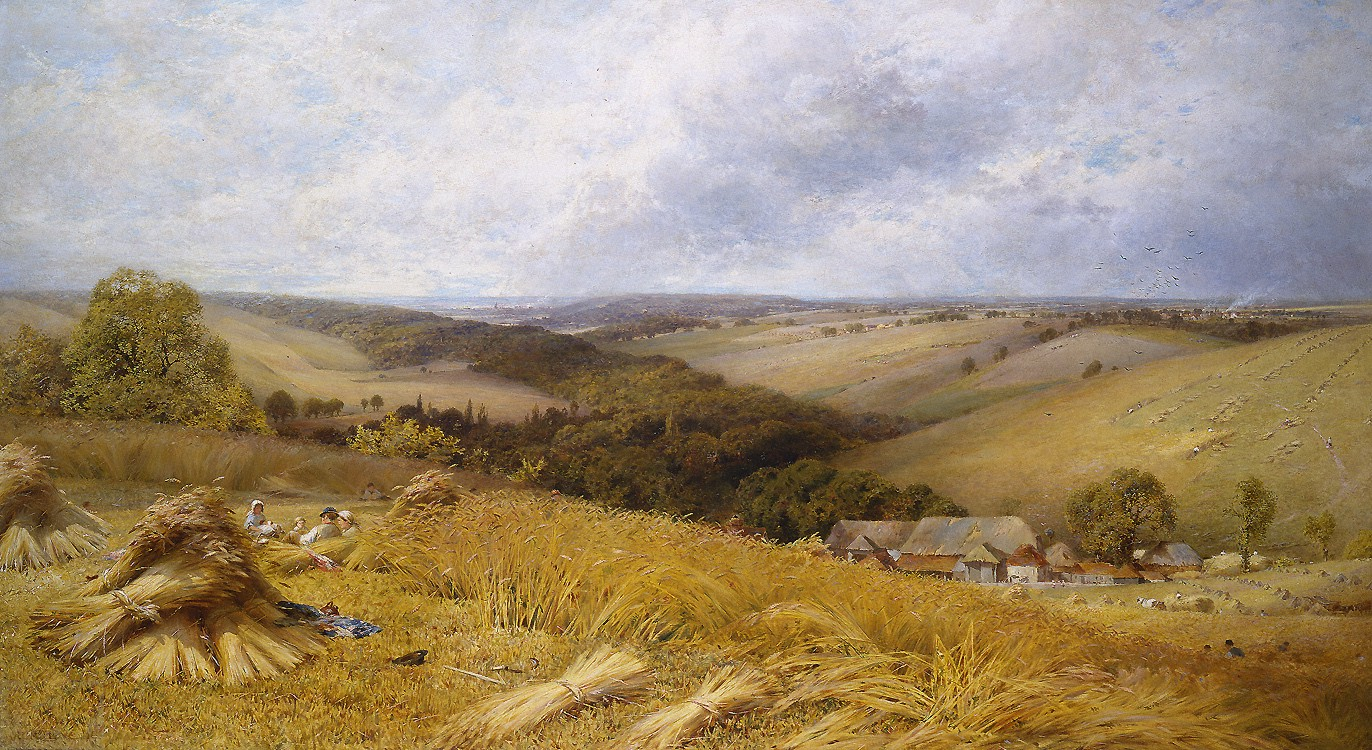
A Hot Day in the Harvest Field

William W. Gosling (1824–1883) was a Victorian landscape painter.

== Career ==
Gosling was one of the early painters showing influence from the Impressionists. He exhibited 13 works at the Royal Academy between 1849 and 1883, 23 at the British Institute between 1851 and 1883), and 176 at Suffolk Street at the gallery of the Society of British Artists. He was elected a member of the Royal Society of British Artists in 1854.

Some of his works may be found at the Victoria and Albert Museum and the Reading Museum.
