= William Gosling (engineer) =

British electrical engineer (born 1932)

William Gosling (September 1932- August 2024) was a British electrical engineer, Emeritus Professor of Electrical Engineering at the University of Bath, and pioneer of system design in electrical engineering.

== Biography ==
Gosling received his ARCS at the Imperial College in London in 1953 under George Paget Thomson, and spent his career both in industry and education. Early 1960s he wrote a series of books, which contributed to the establishment of systems design and systems engineering.

In 1967, Gosling became Professor of Electrical Engineering at the Swansea University. From 1969 to 1971, he was Chair of the Design Research Society. In 1974, he became Professor of Electronic Engineering at the University of Bath, where he remained affiliated for the rest of his career. In the 1970s, he also became Technical Director of Plessey, a British-based international electronics, defence and telecommunications company. Here he managed a division with over fifteen hundred scientists and engineers.

In 1978, he was elected President of EUREL (Convention of National Societies of Electrical Engineers in Western Europe). The next year as president of the Institution of Electronic and Radio Engineers he helped to merge the society into the Institution of Electrical Engineers.

== Publications ==
Gosling wrote some eleven books and over fifty scientific papers. A selection:

- 1962. The design of engineering systems. New York, Wiley
- 1964. Field effect transistor applications. New York, Wiley
- 1965. Mechanical system design. With Wolfgang Ernst Eder
- 1967. The genesis of electrical engineering: Inaugural Lecture Delivered at the College on 24th January, 1967. University College of Swansea
- 1968. An introduction to microelectronic systems. New York, McGraw-Hill
- 1975. A First Course in Applied Electronics. London, The Macmillan Press Ltd
- 1978. Microcircuits, Society and Education
- 1999. Radio Antennas and Propagation, 1st Edition': Radio Engineering Fundamentals
- 2020. Culture’s Engine. London, Palgrave Macmillan
