= The Goslings =

US musical group

- Origin: Florida
- Genres: Drone rock, noise rock
- Years active: 2002–2009, 2025–present
- Labels: No Not Fun Records, Crucial Blast Records, Archive Recordings
- Past members: Leslie Soren; Max Soren

The Goslings are an American drone rock and noise rock band from Florida, United States, with releases on labels such as Not Not Fun Records, Crucial Blast Records, and Archive Recordings. The core members of the band are husband and wife duo Leslie Soren (vocals) and Max Soren (guitar), with a rotating roster of drummers which included Brendan Grubb, Adel Souto, Rick Smith (also of Torche), Paul Leroy and Steve Carrera.

The Goslings' sound is often characterized as "lo-fi," noisy, and heavy, but also beautiful and psychedelic. The group have self-recorded all of their albums on cassette or reel-to-reel tape, are somewhat reclusive and have never toured. They have issued a number of releases since forming in 2002 but their signature album is considered to be Grandeur of Hair (released on Archive Recordings, 2006 and re-pressed in 2009).

The Goslings went on hiatus following the 2009 release of a limited edition double cassette, Sister and Son / Death Garage. Both Leslie and Max remained musically inactive until 2025, when the group released a new album featuring "early recordings finally finished", Plexuses, Planes, with a second volume expected to follow.

== Discography ==
=== Albums ===
- Heaven of Animals (2005)
- Between the Dead with Roxanne Jean Polise (2005)
- Grandeur of Hair (2006)
- Occasion (2008)
- Plexuses, Planes (2025)

=== EPs ===
- Perfect Interior (2003)
- Spaceheater (2004)
- Full Hunters Moon (2005)
- Sister and Son / Death Garage (2009)
- Then & Now (2025)

=== Compilations ===
- Spaceheater / Perfect Interior (2006)

=== Other ===
- Split 7" with Yellow Swans (2007)

=== Compilation appearances ===
- You Already Have Too Many CDRS, Asaurus Records, 2005 - 3 Disc Label Comp. (contributed three tracks: "Untitled", "Compass Rose", "Knocking On Heavens Door")
- For Whom The Casio Tolls, Asaurus Records, 2004 - Label Comp. (contributed one track: "Panopticon")
- Watermelons Should Last Forever, Asaurus Records, 2003 - Label comp. (contributed one track: "Herons")
- Finally Something to Replace Bowling, Asaurus Records, 2002 - Label comp. (contributed one track: "Green Figurine")
- Il Programma Di Religione, Boyarm, 2005 - Label comp. (contributed one track: "Gregory XVI (1831-1846)")
- Songs for the End of the World, 2002 - Label comp. (contributed one track: "CMBR")

== Side projects ==
- Gorgon EP, Tin Cans and Twine, 2005
- Oleta EP, Tin Cans and Twine, 2004 (feat. Max Soren)
