= William Gosling (VC) =

Recipient of the Victoria Cross

- Born: 15 August 1892; Wanborough, Wiltshire, England
- Died: 12 February 1945 (aged 52); Wroughton, Wiltshire, England
- Burial place: St John & St Helen's Churchyard Cemetery Extension, Wroughton, England
- Military career
- Allegiance: United Kingdom
- Branch: British Army
- Rank: Major
- Service number: 645112
- Units: Royal Artillery; Home Guard
- Conflicts: World War I World War II
- Awards: Victoria Cross

Major William Gosling VC (15 August 1892 – 12 February 1945) was an English recipient of the Victoria Cross, the highest and most prestigious award for gallantry in the face of the enemy that can be awarded to British and Commonwealth forces.

William Gosling was born in Wanborough, Wiltshire, one of four children to farmer Albert Gosling and his wife Elizabeth. After his education in the village school he worked alongside his father as a wheat farmer. Following his father's death in a farming accident, the family relocated to Wroughton where Elizabeth, assisted by William and his two elder brothers, took up tenancy of Artis Farm.

In 1908, Gosling enlisted with the Territorial Force. At the age of 18 he emigrated to Canada, where he worked on grain silos before becoming a fireman on the Canadian Pacific Railway.

Following the outbreak of the First World War, he paid for his passage home and enlisted with the 3rd Wessex Brigade, Royal Field Artillery. He departed for France on 6 May 1915 where his battalion was attached to the 51st (Highland) Division, stationed near Arras.

During the precursor bombardment to the Battle of Arras, on 5 April 1917 Gosling was a battery sergeant in charge of several heavy trench mortars. A bomb was fired from a Stokes Mortar of Sergeant Gosling's battery. The citation for his VC, which appeared in The London Gazette in June 1917, reads as follows:

For most conspicuous bravery when in charge of a heavy trench mortar.

Owing to a faulty cartridge the bomb, after discharge, fell 10 yards from the mortar.

Sjt Gosling sprang out, lifted the nose of the bomb, which had sunk into the ground, unscrewed the fuze and threw it on the ground, where it immediately exploded.

This very gallant and prompt action undoubtedly saved the lives of the whole detachment.

For this action he was awarded the VC and was presented with the award by King George V outside Buckingham Palace on 21 July 1917.

After the war, Gosling returned to his home village of Wroughton to take up the tenancy of Summerhouse Farm. He was vice-president of the Wroughton branch of the Royal British Legion and served as a Parish Councillor for 14 years between 1922 and 1936. During World War II, the decorated war hero served as a major in the Home Guard.

Gosling managed and worked his dairy farm in Wroughton for the remainder of his life. He died at his home on 12 February 1945, aged 52. He is buried in the churchyard of St John the Baptist & St Helen's parish church.

== Bibliography ==
- Gliddon, Gerald (2012) [1998]. Arras and Messines 1917. VCs of the First World War. Stroud, Gloucestershire: The History Press. ISBN 978-0-7524-6604-0.
