= Gull Island vole =

Conservation status
- Presumed Extinct (1897) (NatureServe)

Scientific classification
- Domain: Eukaryota
- Kingdom: Animalia
- Phylum: Chordata
- Class: Mammalia
- Order: Rodentia
- Family: Cricetidae
- Subfamily: Arvicolinae
- Genus: Microtus
- Species: M. pennsylvanicus
- Subspecies: †M. p. nesophilus

Trinomial name
- †Microtus pennsylvanicus nesophilus Bailey, 1898

Extinct subspecies of rodent

The Gull Island vole (Microtus pennsylvanicus nesophilus) is an extinct subspecies of the meadow vole that was endemic to Great Gull and Little Gull Islands in New York.

== Extinction ==
A ground-dwelling coastal beach grass herbivore, it presumably disappeared after habitat destruction of sand dunes for naval fortifications in August 1898 for the Spanish–American War, only 9 or 10 years after its discovery in 1888. It was last seen in 1897. Predation by feral cats was also partly responsible in its decline. It is known from fifteen specimens in Washington, D.C.
