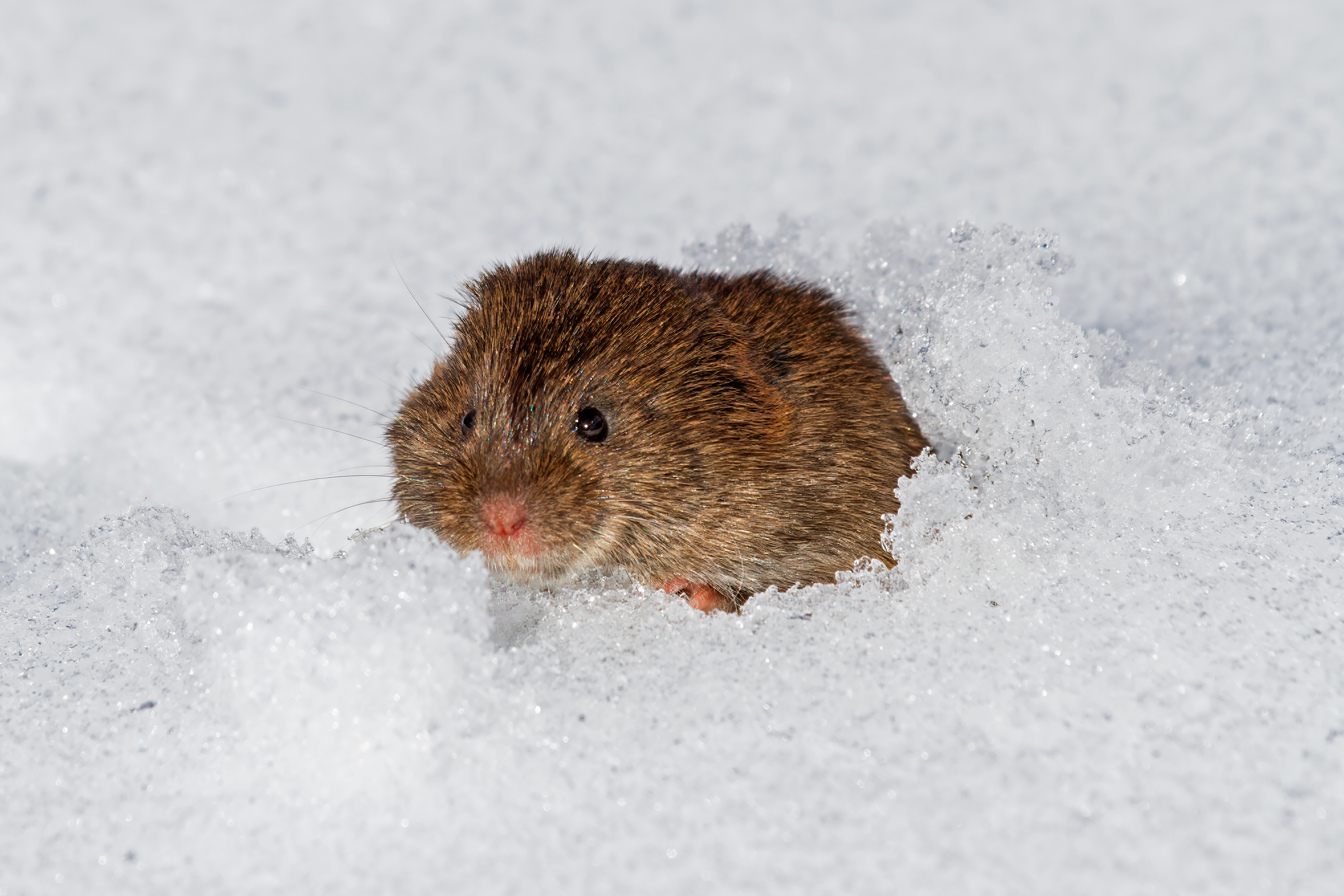
- A meadow vole emerging from a "runway" in the snow.

Conservation status
- Least Concern (IUCN 3.1)

Scientific classification
- Kingdom: Animalia
- Phylum: Chordata
- Class: Mammalia
- Order: Rodentia
- Family: Cricetidae
- Subfamily: Arvicolinae
- Genus: Microtus
- Subgenus: Mynomes
- Species: M. pennsylvanicus

Binomial name
- Microtus pennsylvanicus (Ord, 1815)
- Range (includes western meadow vole, Florida salt marsh vole, and beach vole)

= Eastern meadow vole =

Species of mammal

The eastern meadow vole (Microtus pennsylvanicus), sometimes called the field mouse or meadow mouse, is a North American vole found in eastern Canada and the United States. Its range extends farther south along the Atlantic coast.

The western meadow vole, Florida salt marsh vole, and beach vole were formerly considered regional variants or subspecies of M. pennsylvanicus, but have all since been designated as distinct species.

The eastern meadow vole is active year-round, usually at night. It also digs burrows, where it stores food for the winter and females give birth to their young. Although these animals tend to live close together, they are aggressive towards one another. This is particularly evident in males during the breeding season. They can cause damage to fruit trees, garden plants, and commercial grain crops.

== Taxonomy ==
The species was formerly grouped with the western meadow vole (M. drummondii) and the Florida salt marsh vole (M. dukecampbelli) as a single species with a very large range, but genetic evidence indicates that these are all distinct species.

== Distribution ==
The eastern meadow vole is found throughout eastern North America. It ranges from Labrador and New Brunswick south to South Carolina and extreme northeastern Georgia; west through Tennessee to Ohio. West of Ohio, it is replaced by the western meadow vole. Several subspecies are found on eastern islands, including the beach vole (M. p. breweri) and the extinct Gull Island vole.

== Plant communities ==
Eastern meadow voles are most commonly found in grasslands, preferring moister areas, but are also found in wooded areas.

In east-central Ohio, eastern meadow voles were captured in reconstructed common cattail (Typha latifolia) wetlands. In Virginia, eastern meadow voles were least abundant in eastern red cedar (Juniperus virginiana) glades and most abundant in fields with dense grass cover.

== Habits ==
Eastern meadow voles are active year-round and day or night, with no clear 24-hour rhythm in many areas. Most changes in activity are imposed by season, habitat, cover, temperature, and other factors. Eastern meadow voles have to eat frequently, and their active periods (every two to three hours) are associated with food digestion. In Canada, eastern meadow voles are active the first few hours after dawn and during the two- to four-hour period before sunset. Most of the inactive period is spent in the nest.

== Reproduction ==
Gestation lasts 20 to 23 days. Neonates are pink and hairless, with closed eyes and ears. Fur begins to appear by three days, and young are completely furred except for the belly by seven days. Eyes and ears open by eight days. Weaning occurs from 12 to 14 days. Young born in spring and early summer attain adult weight in 12 weeks, but undergo a fall weight loss. Young born in late summer continue growing through the fall and maintain their weight through the winter. Maximum size is reached between two and 10 months.

Typical eastern meadow vole litters consist of four to six young, with extremes of one and 11 young. On average, 2.6 young are successfully weaned per litter. Litter size is not significantly correlated with latitude, elevation, or population density. Fall, winter, and spring litters tend to be smaller than summer litters. Litter size was positively correlated with body size, and is not significantly different in primiparous and multiparous females. Primiparous females had fewer young per litter than multiparous females. Litter size was constant in summer breeding periods at different population densities. Female eastern meadow voles reach reproductive maturity earlier than males; some ovulate and become pregnant as early as three weeks old. Males are usually six to eight weeks old before mature sperm are produced. One captive female produced 17 litters in one year for a total of 83 young. One of her young produced 13 litters (totalling 78 young) before she was a year old.

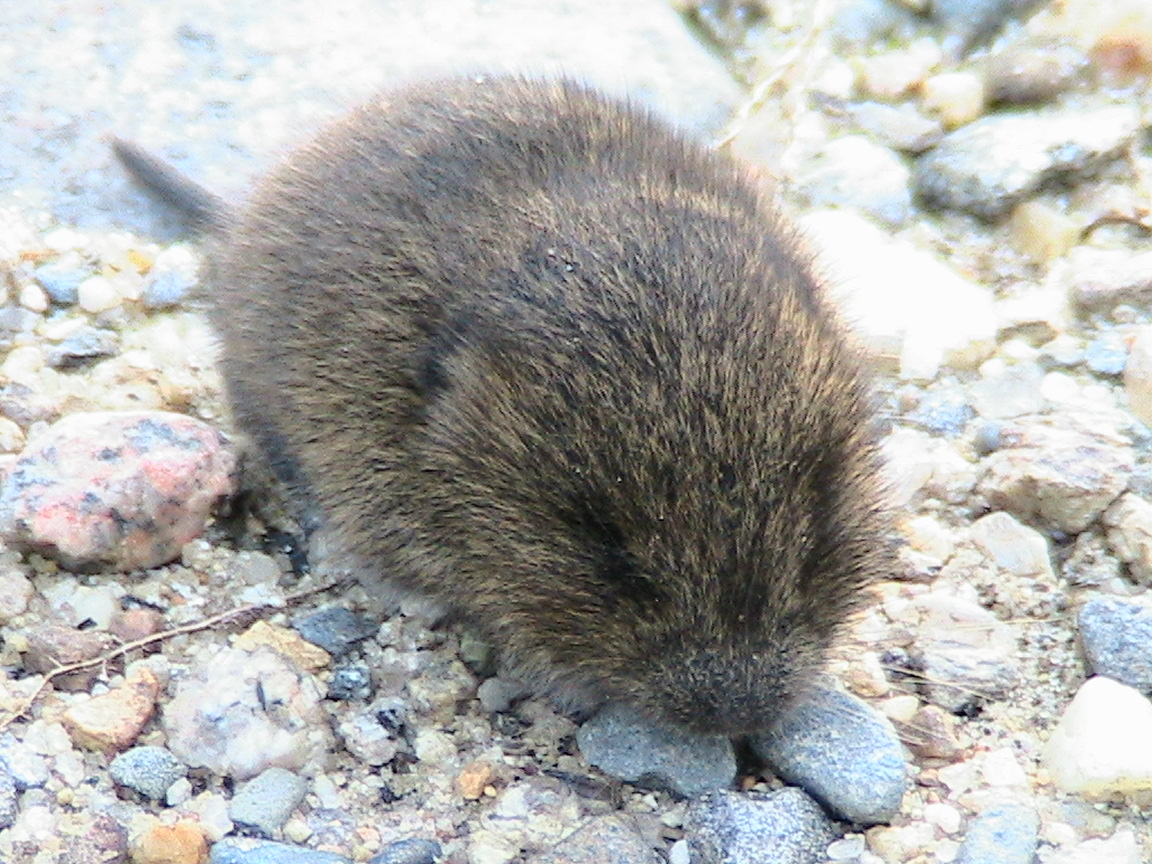
Juvenile in the open

Patterns of mortality apparently vary among eastern meadow vole populations. The average eastern meadow vole lifespan is less than one month because of high nestling and juvenile mortality. The average time adults are recapturable in a given habitat is about two months, suggesting the average extended lifespan (i.e. how much time adult eastern meadow voles have left) is about two months, not figuring in emigration. Mortality was 88% for the first 30 days after birth. and post-nestling juveniles had the highest mortality rate (61%), followed by young adults (58%) and older age groups (53%). Nestlings were estimated to have the lowest mortality rate (50%). Estimated mean longevity ranges from two to 16 months. The maximum lifespan in the wild is 16 months, and few voles live more than two years.

Eastern meadow vole populations fluctuate annually and also tend to reach peak densities at two- to five-year intervals, with population declines in intervening years. Breeding often ceases in January and starts again in March. Over the course of a year, eastern meadow vole populations tend to be lowest in early spring; the population increases rapidly through summer and fall.

In years of average population sizes, typical eastern meadow vole population density is about 15 to 45 eastern meadow voles per acre in old-field habitat. In peak years, their population densities may reach 150 per acre in marsh habitat (more favorable for eastern meadow voles than old fields). Peak eastern meadow vole abundance can exceed 1,482 eastern meadow voles per hectare (600/acre) in northern prairie wetlands. Eastern meadow voles in optimal habitats in Virginia (old fields with dense vegetation) reached densities of 983/ha (398/ac); populations declined to 67/ha (27/ac) at the lowest point in the cycle. Different factors influencing population density have been assigned primary importance by different authors. Reich listed the following factors as having been suggested by different authors: food quality, predation, climatic events, density-related physiological stress, and the presence of genetically determined behavioral variants among dispersing individuals.

Normal population cycles do not occur when dispersal is prevented; under normal conditions, dispersers have been shown to be behaviorally, genetically, and demographically different from residents. A threshold density of cover is thought to be needed for eastern meadow vole populations to increase. Above the threshold amount, the quantity of cover influences the amplitude and possibly the duration of the population peak. Local patches of dense cover could serve as source populations or reservoirs to colonize less favorable habitats with sparse cover.

Eastern meadow voles form extensive colonies and develop communal latrine areas. They are socially aggressive and agonistic; females dominate males and males fight amongst themselves.

== Habitat ==
Optimal eastern meadow vole habitat consists of moist, dense grassland with substantial amounts of plant litter. Habitat selection is largely influenced by relative ground cover of grasses and forbs; soil temperature, moisture, sodium, potassium, and pH levels; humidity; and interspecific competition. Eastern meadow voles are most commonly associated with sites having high soil moisture. They are often restricted to the wetter microsites when they occur in sympatry with prairie voles (Microtus ochrogaster) or montane voles.

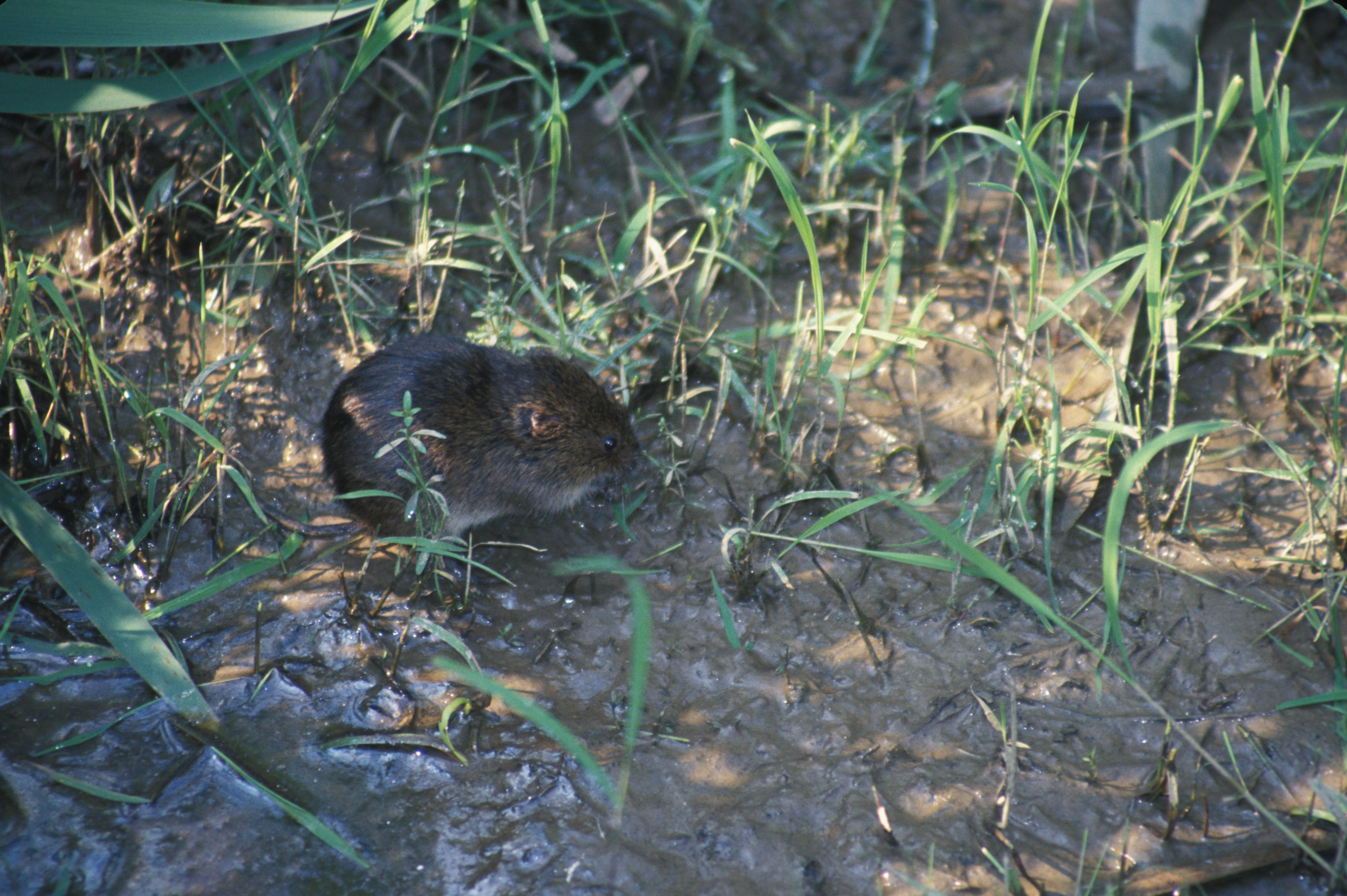
On the ground amid strands of grass in Virginia, US

In eastern Massachusetts, eastern meadow vole density on a mosaic of grassy fields and mixed woods was positively correlated with decreasing vertical woody stem density and decreasing shrub cover. Density was highest on plots with more forbs and grasses and less with woody cover; eastern meadow voles preferred woody cover over sparse vegetation where grassy cover was not available.

In West Virginia, the only forested habitats in which eastern meadow voles were captured were seedling stands.

In Pennsylvania, three subadult eastern meadow voles were captured at least 1.6 miles (2.6 km) from the nearest appreciable suitable eastern meadow vole habitat, suggesting they are adapted to long-distance dispersal.

In Ohio, the effects of patch shape and proportion of edge were investigated by mowing strips between study plots. The square plots were 132 feet per side (40 m x 40 m), and the rectangular patches were 52.8 feet by 330 feet (16 m x 100 m). Square habitat patches were not significantly different from rectangular patches in eastern meadow vole density. Edge effects in patches of this size were not found, suggesting eastern meadow voles are edge-tolerant. Habitat patch shape did affect dispersal and space use behaviors. In rectangular patches, home ranges were similar in size to those in square patches, but were elongated.

Eastern meadow voles tend to remain in home ranges and defend at least a portion of their home ranges from conspecifics. Home ranges overlap and have irregular shapes. Home range size depends on season, habitat, and population density: ranges are larger in summer than winter, those in marshes are larger than in meadows, and are smaller at higher population densities. Home ranges vary in size from 0.08 to 2.3 hectares (0.32–0.9 ac). Females have smaller home ranges than males, but are more highly territorial than males; often, juveniles from one litter are still present in the adult female's home range when the next litter is born. Female territoriality tends to determine density in suboptimal habitats; the amount of available forage may be the determining factor in female territory size, so determines reproductive success.

== Cover requirements ==
Nests are used as nurseries, resting areas, and as protection against weather. They are constructed of woven grass; they are usually subterranean or are constructed under boards, rocks, logs, brush piles, hay bales, fenceposts, or in grassy tussocks. Eastern meadow voles dig shallow burrows, and in burrows, nests are constructed in enlarged chambers. In winter, nests are often constructed on the ground surface under a covering of snow, usually against some natural formation such as a rock or log.

Eastern meadow voles form runways or paths in dense grasses.

== Diets ==
Eastern meadow voles eat most available species of grasses, sedges, and forbs, including many agricultural plant species. In summer and fall, grasses are cut into match-length sections to reach the succulent portions of the leaves and seedheads. Leaves, flowers, and fruits of forbs are also typical components of the summer diet. Fungi, primarily Endogone spp., have been reported in eastern meadow vole diets. They occasionally consume insects and snails, and occasionally scavenge on animal remains; cannibalism is frequent in periods of high population density. Eastern meadow voles may damage woody vegetation by girdling when population density is high.

In winter, eastern meadow voles consume green basal portions of grass plants, often hidden under snow. Other winter diet components include seeds, roots, and bulbs. They occasionally strip the bark from woody plants. Seeds and tubers are stored in nests and burrows. Evidence of coprophagy is sparse, but thought to occur.

In an old-field community in Quebec, plants preferred by eastern meadow voles included quackgrass (Elytrigia repens), sedges, fescues (Festuca spp.), wild strawberry (Fragaria virginiana), timothy (Phleum pratense), bluegrasses (Poa spp.), and bird vetch (Vicia cracca).

== Predators ==
Eastern meadow voles are important prey for many hawks, owls, and mammalian carnivores, and are also taken by some snakes. Almost all species of raptors take microtine (Microtus spp.) rodents as prey. Birds not usually considered predators of mice do take voles; examples include gulls (Larus spp.), northern shrike (Larius borealis), common raven (Corvus corax), American crow (C. brachyrhynchos), great blue heron (Ardea herodias), and American bittern (Botaurus lentiginosus). In Ohio, eastern meadow voles comprised 90% of the individual prey remains in long-eared owl (Asio otus) pellets on a relict wet prairie, and in Wisconsin, eastern meadow voles comprised 95% of short-eared owl (A. flammeus) prey. Most mammalian predators take microtine prey. The American short-tailed shrew (Blarina brevicauda) may be a predator; eastern meadow voles avoid areas frequented by short-tailed shrews. Other major mammalian predators include the badger (Taxidea taxus), striped skunk (Mephitis mephitis), weasels (Mustela spp.), marten (Martes americana), domestic dog (Canis familiaris), domestic cat (Felis catus) and mountain lion. Other animals reported to have ingested voles include trout (Salmo spp.) and garter snake (Thamnophis spp.).

In Florida, eastern meadow voles may be eaten by some growth stage of invasive snakes like Burmese pythons, reticulated pythons, Southern African rock pythons, Central African rock pythons, boa constrictors, yellow anacondas, Bolivian anacondas, dark-spotted anacondas, and green anacondas.

== Management ==
Eastern meadow voles are abundant in agricultural habitats. The list of crops damaged by eastern meadow voles includes root and stem crops (asparagus, kohlrabi), tubers, leaf and leafstalks, immature inflorescent vegetables (artichoke, broccoli), low-growing fruits (beans, squash), the bark of fruit trees, pasture, grassland, hay, and grains. Eastern meadow voles are listed as pests on forest plantations. In central New York, colonization of old fields by trees and shrubs was reduced due to seedling predation by eastern meadow voles, particularly under the herb canopy.

Management of eastern meadow vole populations in agricultural areas includes reduction of habitat in waste places such as roadsides and fencerows by mowing, plowing, and herbicide application. Predators, particularly raptors, should be protected to keep eastern meadow vole populations in check. Direct control methods include trapping, fencing, and poisoning; trapping and fencing are of limited effectiveness. Poisons are efficient. Repellents are largely ineffective at present. Plastic mesh cylinders were effective in preventing seedling damage by eastern meadow voles and other rodents. Properly timed cultivation and controlled fires are at least partially effective in reducing populations.

Ecto- and endoparasites have been reported to include trematodes, cestodes, nematodes, acanthocephalans, lice (Anoplura), fleas (Siphonaptera), Diptera, and ticks and mites (Acari).

Human diseases transmitted by microtine rodents include cystic hydatid disease, tularemia, bubonic plague, babesiosis, giardiasis and the Lyme disease spirochete Borrelia burgdorferi.

== Ecological importance ==
As with many other small mammal species, M. pennsylvanicus plays important ecological roles. The eastern meadow vole is an important food source for many predators, and disperses mycorrhizal fungi. It is a major consumer of grass and disperses grass nutrients in its feces. After disruptive site disturbances such as forest or meadow fires, the meadow vole's activities contribute to habitat restoration. It prefers open, nonforest habitats and colonizes such open areas created by fire or other clearing disturbances. Very few eastern meadow voles are found in forest or woodland areas. In newly opened areas, it is quite abundant. In these new open areas, the vole quickly becomes a food source for predators.

== Threats ==
While it is a common and wide-ranging species throughout eastern North America, insular populations on the eastern periphery of the species' range are at risk from invasive species, with the extinction of the Gull Island vole being a notable example of this. In addition, due to its dependence on mesic habitats, populations of the species on the mainland periphery of its range in the Southeastern United States may be at potential risk from climate change-induced aridification.
