= John Baverstock Knight =

English land surveyor and painter (1785–1859)

John Baverstock Knight (1785 – 1859) was an English painter.

== Life ==
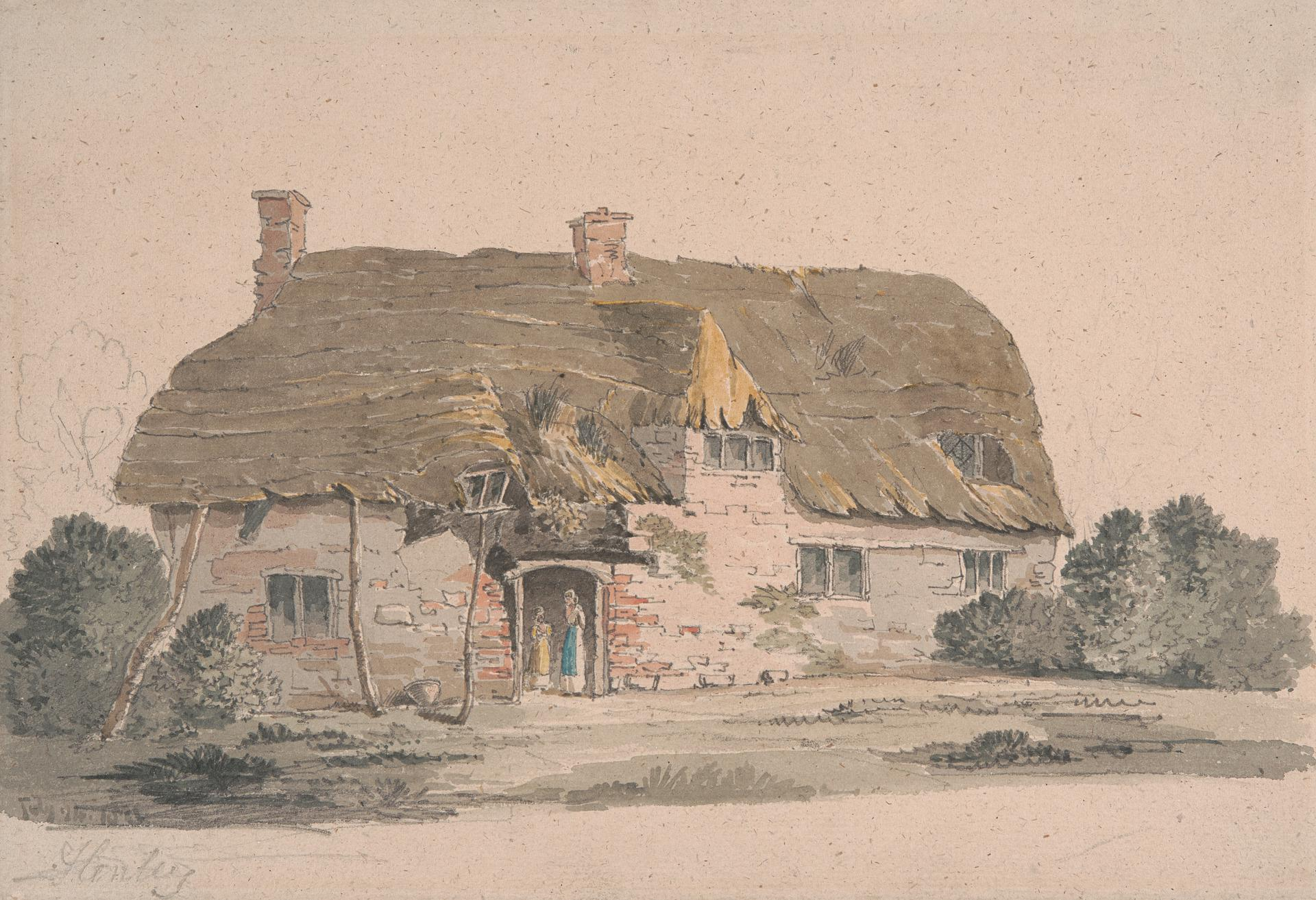
Thatched Cottage near Henley (1821)

John Baverstock Knight, born at the parsonage, Langton, near Blandford, Dorset, on 3 May 1785, was second son of John Forster Knight, land-agent, and Sophia his wife. He was educated at home and in a commercial school at Child Okeford. He became assistant to his father as land surveyor and agent, but from a love of art, which his father encouraged, took to water-colour painting. His careful studies from nature brought him much local reputation, and he exhibited one or two architectural subjects at the Royal Academy. In 1816 he published some etchings of old buildings in Dorset, one of which, a view of Bradford Abbas Church, was published in the Gentleman’s Magazine for 1818.

After the death of his father and his own marriage, the care of his mother and younger brother devolved on Knight, and this, coupled with increasing bad health, led him to abandon art as a profession. He died at West Lodge, Piddle Hinton, Dorset, on 14 May 1859. His works were favourably noticed by Henry Fuseli, Sir Thomas Lawrence, and other competent authorities. A neighbour and intimate friend of Knight's was Thomas Rackett the antiquary, rector of Spetisbury, Dorset.

== Bibliography ==
- Bendall, Sarah (2004). "Knight, John Baverstock (1785–1859), land surveyor and painter". In Oxford Dictionary of National Biography. Oxford University Press.
- Cust, Lionel Henry (1892). "Knight, John Baverstock" . In Lee, Sidney (ed.). Dictionary of National Biography. Vol. 31. London: Smith, Elder & Co. p. 257.
- MacColl, D. S. (1919). "John Baverstock Knight". The Burlington Magazine for Connoisseurs, 34(194), 171–173.
- Oliver, Valerie Cassel, ed. (2011). "Knight, John Baverstock". In Benezit Dictionary of Artists. Oxford University Press.
