= John Gostling =

British singer

John Gostling (1644–1733) was a 17th-century Church of England clergyman and bass singer famed for his range and power. He was a favourite singer of Charles II and is particularly associated with the music of Henry Purcell.

== Background ==
John Gostling was the son of Isaac Gossling, a Canterbury mercer, or chandler. He was educated in Rochester and at St John's College, Cambridge, where he sang in the choir. He was a Gentleman and later Priest of the Chapel Royal and was subsequently a Minor Canon of Canterbury, Vicar of Littlebourne in Kent, Subdean of St Paul's and Prebendary of Lincoln. He is buried in Canterbury Cathedral cloisters.

In 1679 the young Henry Purcell wrote an anthem, the name of which is not known, for the Chapel Royal. From a letter written by Thomas Purcell, and still extant, we learn that this anthem was composed for the exceptionally fine voice of Gostling, then at Canterbury, but afterwards a gentleman of His Majesty's chapel. Purcell wrote several anthems at different times for his extraordinary voice, a basso profondo, which is known to have had a range of at least two full octaves, from D below the bass staff to the D above it. The dates of very few of these sacred compositions are known; perhaps the most notable example is the anthem "They that go down to the sea in ships". In thankfulness for a providential escape of the King from shipwreck, Gostling, who had been of the royal party, put together some verses from the Psalms in the form of an anthem, and requested Purcell to set them to music. The work is a very difficult one, including a passage which traverses the full extent of Gostling's voice, beginning on the upper D and descending two octaves to the lower.

== Gostling Manuscript ==
One of the important sources for Purcell's music is the Gostling Manuscript, a collection made by Gostling in 1706, which contains sixty-four anthems: seventeen by Purcell, twenty-three by John Blow, three by Matthew Locke, four by Pelham Humfrey, four by William Turner, and one by William Child, one by Henry Aldrich, three by Thomas Tudway, four by Jeremiah Clarke, Isaac Blackwell and a few others.

== See also ==
- William Gostling, his son

== Bibliography ==
- The Gostling Manuscript. Foreword by Franklin B. Zimmerman. Author: Gostling, John, comp. Purcell, Henry, 1659-1695 (Austin, Texas UP, 1977). "Reproduced in facsim. from a 17th-18th cent. ms. in the Humanities Research Center, University of Texas at Austin." ISBN 0-292-72713-5.
