= Brian Mayes =

Brian Mayes may refer to:

- Brian Mayes (British Army officer) (1934–2019), British general in the Royal Army Medical Corps
- Brian Mayes (cricketer) (born 1950), English cricketer
- Brian Mayes, Winnipeg City Councillor first elected in 2010, see Winnipeg City Council

== See also ==
- Brian May (born 1947), British musician
- Brian May (Australian composer) (1934–1997)
