= Albertus Bryne =

English organist and composer

Albertus Bryne (variants: Albert Bryan; Albert Brian) (ca. 1621 – 2 December 1668) was an English organist and composer.

== Biography ==
His teacher was John Tomkins, organist of St Paul's Cathedral, a role in which he succeeded his teacher in 1638. He was dismissed from the post by the Puritans and, during the Commonwealth, taught the harpsichord. He returned to St Paul's at the Restoration but was not granted a request to be made organist of the Chapel Royal, Whitehall. He took up a post at Westminster Abbey after the Great Fire of London, and was succeeded by John Blow upon his death in 1668. He continued to receive a salary from St. Paul's until his death. According to Anthony Wood, he was buried in the cloisters at Westminster Abbey, but his grave has not been found.

He was respected in his time as 'that famously velvet fingered Organist' (J. Batchiler, The Virgin’s Pattern, 1661) and 'an excellent musician (Wood). He was one of the finest English harpsichord composers of the time and exerted a significant influence on later composers. His suites are among the earliest surviving English examples with four movements.

=== Albertus Bryne II ===
His son, also called Albertus, worked with him at St Paul's Cathedral until January 1671, and was organist at Dulwich College from 1671 to 1677. It was probably he who was organist of All Hallows-by-the-Tower from 1676 until his death in 1713, though he was referred to as 'Mr Bryan'. Bryne (II) is not known to have composed.

== Compositions ==
=== Choral ===
- Short Service in G, SATB and organ
- 3 full anthems, SATB and organ
- 2 verse anthems

=== Harpsichord ===
All published in Albertus Bryne – Keyboard Works for Harpsichord and Organ Edited by T. Charlston (Oslo, 2008)

- 5 dance movements, (1678)
- 3 suites
- 2 suites
- 1 suite
- 2 movements
- 4 suites published in Recent Researches in the Music of the Baroque Era LXXXI (Madison, Wisconsin, 1997)
- Voluntary for organ (doubtful)

== Sources ==
- B.A.R Cooper: 'Bryne [Bryan, Brian], Albertus [Albert]', Grove Music Online ed. L. Macy (Accessed 2007-07-05), http://www.grovemusic.com/

Cultural offices
Preceded by John Tomkins	Organist of St Paul's Cathedral; 1638-1642 and 1660-1668	Succeeded by Isaac Blackwell
Preceded by Christopher Gibbons	Organist of Westminster Abbey; 1666-1668	Succeeded by John Blow
