= Ebenezer Forrest =

English attorney.and writer

Ebenezer Forrest (fl. 1774), was an English attorney.

Forrest resided at George Street, York Buildings, London, and was intimate with William Hogarth and John Rich, proprietor of the Lincoln's Inn Theatre. He was the father of Theodosius Forrest.

== Works ==
Forrest's opera Momus turn'd Fabulist, or Vulcan's Wedding, was first performed at the Lincoln's Inn Theatre on 3 December 1729 and on several subsequent nights. He also authored An Account of What Seemed Most Remarkable in the Five Days' Peregrination of the Five Following Persons, viz. Messrs. Tothall, Scott, Hogarth, Thornhill, and Forrest, which chronicles a journey that took place from 27 to 31 May 1732. The work was published in London in 1782 and includes illustrations by Hogarth. A reprint, accompanied by William Gostling's Hudibrastic adaptation, was issued in London in 1872.
