= Isaac Blackwell =

British musician

Isaac Blackwell (died 1699) was a composer and English Cathedral organist, who served at St. Paul's Cathedral.

== Background ==
His compositions are not well known.

Amongst his madrigal output are:

- “Give me thy youth”
- I saw fair Cloris walk alone.

An anthem "O Lord our Governor" was included in the Chapel Royal Partbooks., and "Bow down thine ear, O Lord" in the Gostling Partbooks.

== Career ==
Organist of:

- St Dunstan-in-the-West 1674–1699
- St Michael, Cornhill 1684–1699
- St. Paul's Cathedral 1687–1699

Cultural offices
Preceded by none	Organist of St Michael, Cornhill; 1684-1699	Succeeded by Walter Holt
Preceded by Albertus Bryne	Organist of St. Paul's Cathedral; 1687-1699	Succeeded by Jeremiah Clarke
