= William Gostling =

English clergyman and antiquary

William Gostling (January, 1696 – 9 March, 1777) was an English clergyman and antiquary, known as a historian of Canterbury.

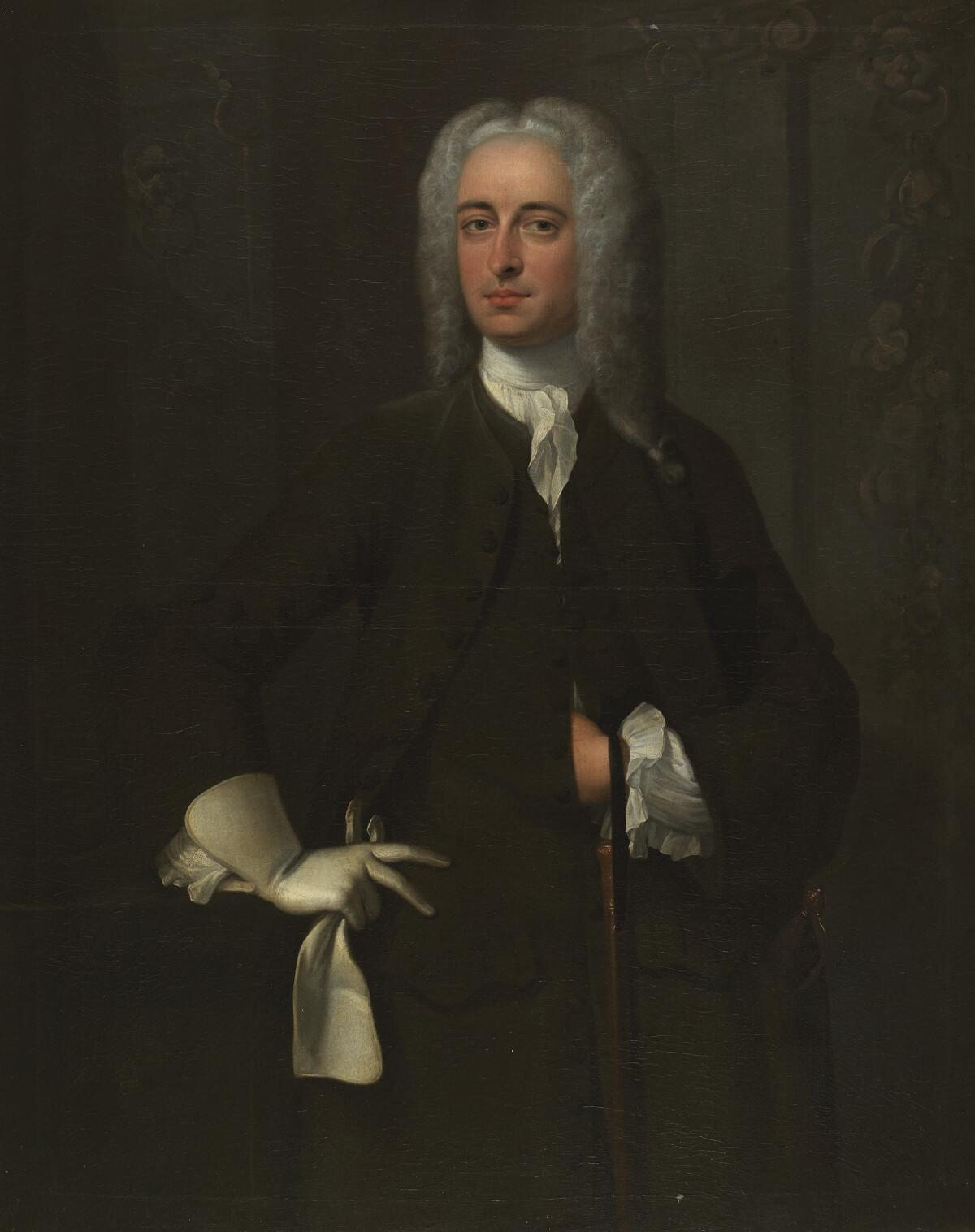
William Gostling c.1740

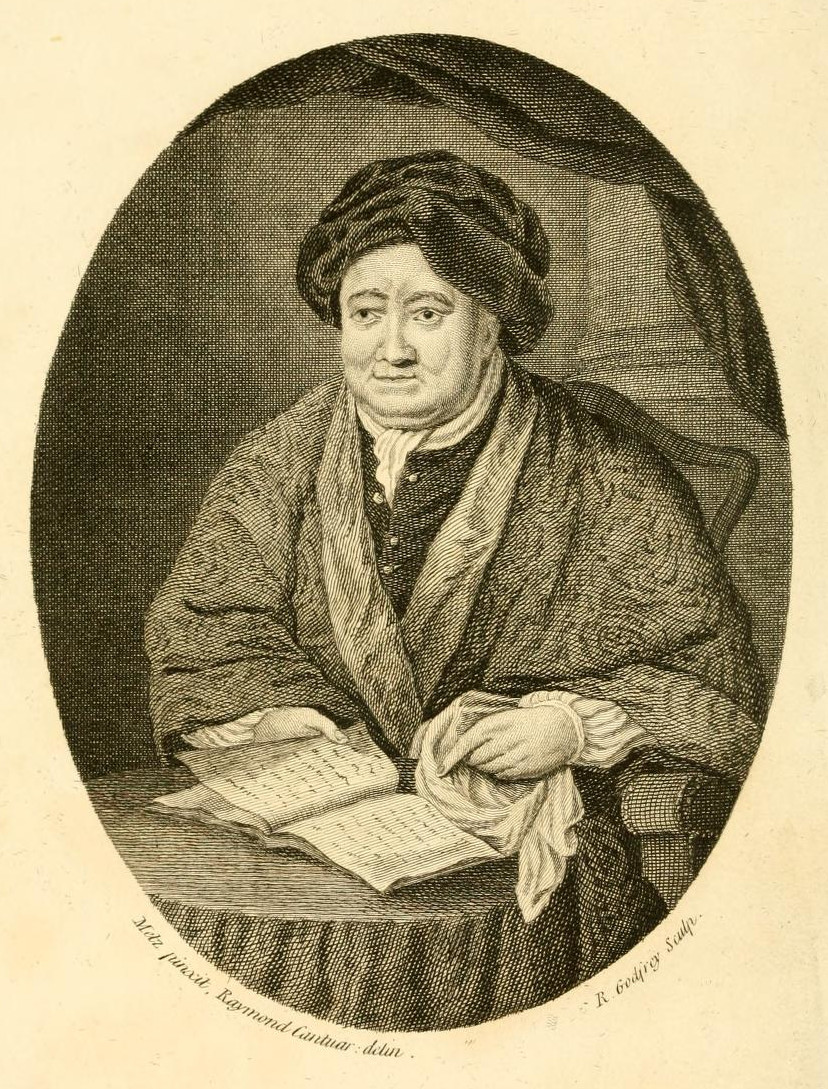
William Gostling

== Life ==
The son of John Gostling by his wife Dorothy, he was born at Canterbury in January 1696, and baptised in the cathedral on 30 January. He was educated at the King's School, Canterbury, where he was a king's scholar, and at St John's College, Cambridge, entering in 1711, and taking the degrees of B.A. in 1715, M.A. in 1719. The rest of his life was passed in or near Canterbury.

Gostling served in the diocese of Canterbury as curate or parish priest from 1720. He was instituted to the rectory of Brook near Wye, Kent, on 23 September 1722. He held a minor canonry at Canterbury from 1727 until his death. His father died on 17 July 1733, and vacated the vicarage of Littlebourne, to which Gostling succeeded. He gave it up in 1753, on being appointed to Stone in Oxney.

Gostling acted as a guide in Canterbury, but during the last two decades of his life was largely confined to his room. He was visited in 1772 and again in 1773 by Sir John Hawkins, who was then researching his History of Music. He died at his house in the Mint Yard, Canterbury, on 9 March 1777, and was buried in the cloisters on 15 March. He possessed a significant collection of manuscripts of works by Henry Purcell; these were sold by Messrs. Langford. His library was sold by William Flackton of Canterbury in 1778.

== Works ==
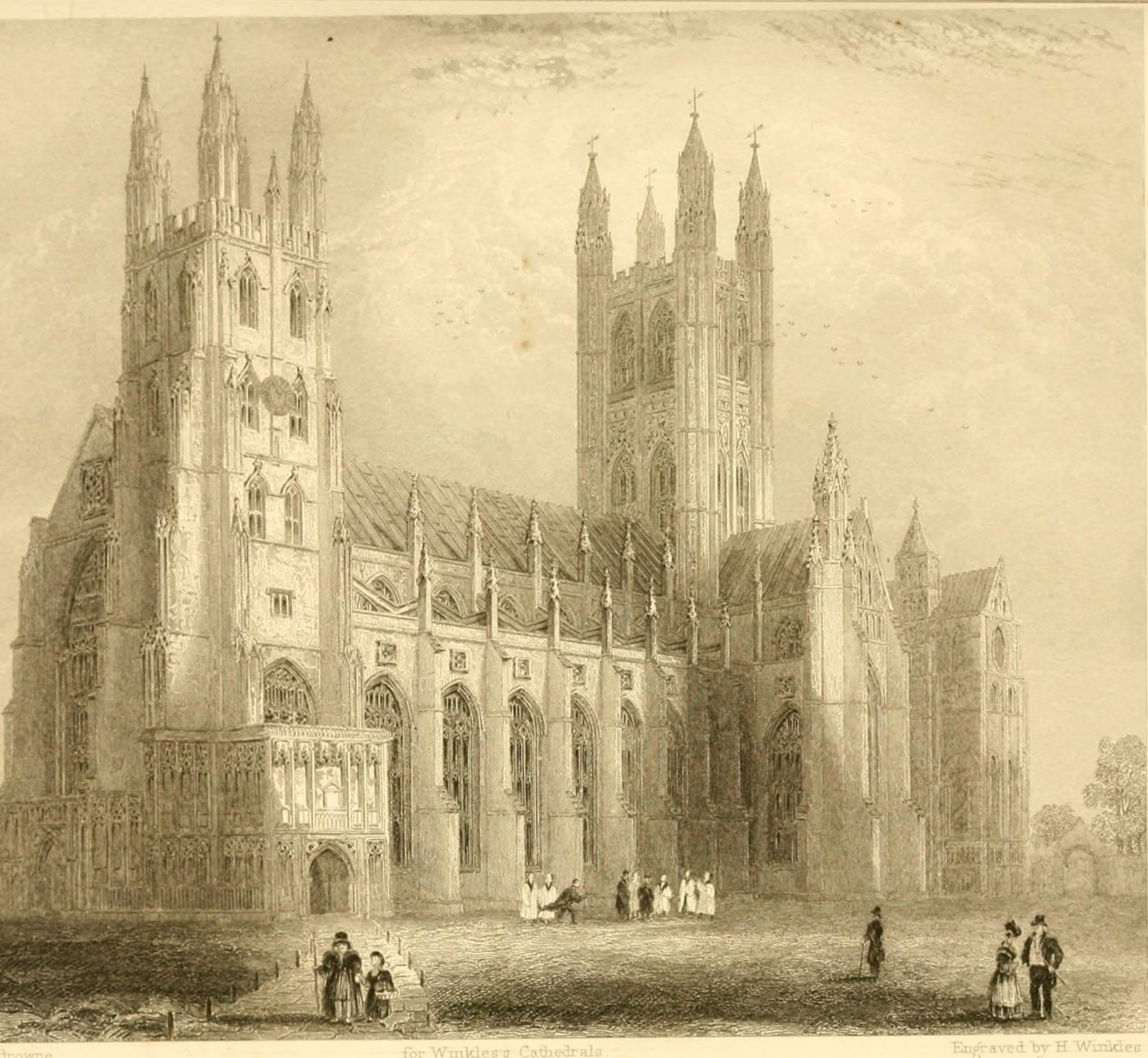
A walk in and about the city of Canterbury

Gostling's Walk in and about the City of Canterbury appeared in 1774. A second corrected edition, in 1777, was for the benefit of his surviving daughter, Hester Gostling, and friends contributed additional plates. Other editions were issued in 1779, 1796, 1804, and 1825. The account of the painted windows in the cathedral was supplied by Dr. Osmund Beauvoir, head-master of the King's School.

A manuscript account of William Hogarth's expedition in 1732, by Ebenezer Forrest, was given to Gostling, who turned the narrative into verse. It was printed by John Nichols in 1781; and later inserted in his Anecdotes of Hogarth (1782), and by William Hone in his Table-book. It was reprinted by John Camden Hotten in 1872.

Gostling contributed to the Philosophical Transactions, xli. 871, an "Account of a Fireball and Explosion at Canterbury", and to the Gentleman's Magazine.

== Family ==
Gostling married in Canterbury Cathedral, on 3 October 1717, Hester Thomas. They were both then described as of the precincts. She died on 24 February 1760, aged 64, and was buried in the cloisters on 3 March. Six of their children died young; two sons and one daughter survived. They were commemorated on an oval marble tablet on the west side of the cloisters at Canterbury.

== Notes ==
Attribution

This article incorporates text from a publication now in the public domain: "Gostling, William". Dictionary of National Biography. London: Smith, Elder & Co. 1885–1900.
