= John Tomkins (composer) =

Welsh-born organist and composer

John Tomkins (1586 – 27 September 1638) was a Welsh-born organist and composer, a half-brother of the composer Thomas Tomkins. He was organist at St Paul's Cathedral in London from 1619.

== Life ==
Tomkins was born in St David's in Pembrokeshire in 1586. His father Thomas Tomkins, a vicar choral at St David's Cathedral, became a minor canon at Gloucester Cathedral by 1594, and it is thought that John was a chorister there. In 1606 John Tomkins succeeded Orlando Gibbons as organist of King's College, Cambridge. After studying music there for ten years, he received the degree of Mus. Bac. in June 1608, on condition of composing a piece for performance at the graduation ceremony.

Phineas Fletcher, a friend of Tomkins at King's College, made him an interlocutor (named Thomalin) in three of his eclogues. Tomkins left Cambridge and in 1619 became organist of St Paul's Cathedral. Fletcher, then in Norfolk, addressed a poem to him on the occasion. In 1625 Tomkins became gentleman-extraordinary of the Chapel Royal, and gentlemen-in-ordinary in 1627.

Tomkins died on 27 September 1638, and was buried in St Paul's; William Lawes composed an elegy on his death, printed by Henry Lawes in Choice Psalms (1648). Tomkins's pupil Albertus Bryne succeeded him at St Paul's, and Richard Portman succeeded him at the Chapel Royal. His son Thomas became chancellor and canon of Exeter Cathedral.

Some anthems composed by John Tomkins are included in Barnard's manuscript collection. He composed a set of sixteen keyboard variations on "John, come kiss me now", which his brother Thomas copied in Additional MS. 29996 (at the British Museum).
