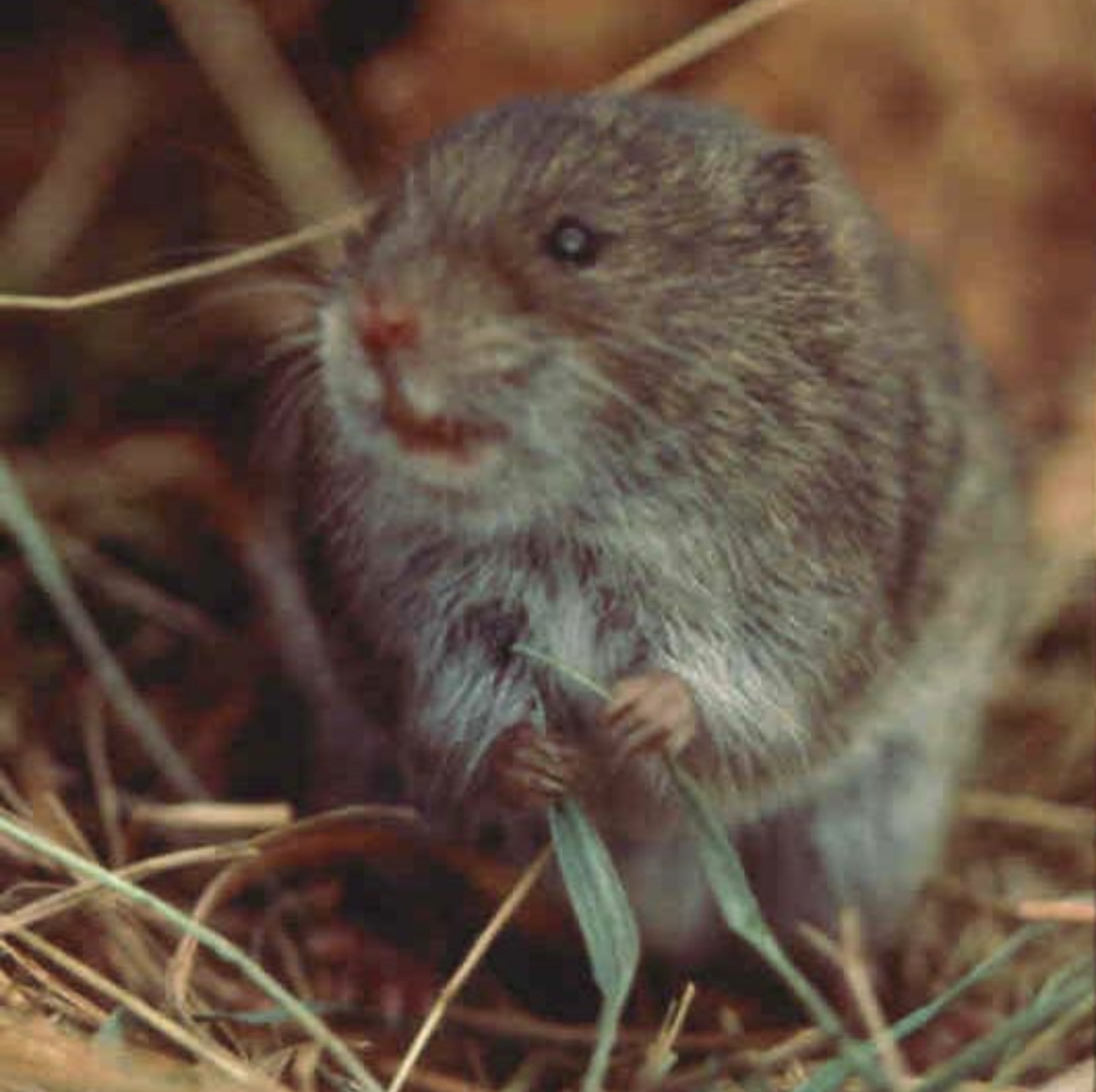

Conservation status
- Vulnerable (IUCN 3.1)

- Critically Imperiled (NatureServe)

Scientific classification
- Kingdom: Animalia
- Phylum: Chordata
- Class: Mammalia
- Order: Rodentia
- Family: Cricetidae
- Subfamily: Arvicolinae
- Genus: Microtus
- Species: M. breweri

Binomial name
- Microtus breweri Baird, 1858

Synonyms
- Microtus pennsylvanicus breweri; Arvicola breweri

= Beach vole =

Subspecies of rodent

The beach vole (Microtus breweri) or Muskeget vole is a rodent in the family Cricetidae. This close relative of the eastern meadow vole (Microtus pennsylvanicus) is endemic to the 0.87 km^{2} Muskeget Island, Massachusetts. Due to its relatively short period of reproductive isolation, there is debate over the beach vole's designation as a subspecies of M. pennsylvanicus.

== Taxonomy ==
Microtus breweri is currently recognized by the IUCN, NatureServe and ITIS as a distinct species, due to its larger size, geographic isolation, and contrasting mating habits. A recent genetic study indicates that it may be a basal subspecies of M. pennsylvanicus.

== Description ==
Beach voles are typically much larger than meadow voles. On average, male beach voles are 192.9 mm long, ranging between 169 and 215 mm; with the tail making up approximately one-fourth of the total length. Generally, females are smaller, with an average length of 181.2 mm, ranging between 165 and 201 mm. The weight of a beach vole ranges between 29 and 79 g, proportional to age, with females weighing less than males.

Compared to meadow voles, beach voles exhibit a lower metabolism, and their coat is made up of more guard hairs and fewer underhairs. A white blaze can often be found on the chin or forehead.

The skulls of M. breweri can be easily distinguished from those of meadow voles. The average cranial length of beach voles is 13.1 mm, while the cranial breadth is generally 11.2 mm. Their skull is larger, and their brain case is longer and narrower than meadow voles. Recent unpublished observations include a distinctly shaped interparietal bone and a narrow bridge between the orbits.

Beach voles tend closer towards K selection than meadow voles, and some of their distinctive features are indicative of island gigantism.

== Distribution ==
Microtus breweri can only be found on Muskeget Island, off the west coast of Nantucket, Massachusetts, in the United States. However, historically it was also found on nearby South Point and Adams Islands, which are sometimes considered as a part of Muskeget Island, but are no longer above sea level. The vole was extirpated from Muskeget proper by 1891 as a result of predation by stray cats (Felis catus), but was reintroduced by Gerrit S. Miller, Outram Bangs, and Chas F. Batchelder in 1893 from a colony captured on South Point Island. Moreover, Muskeget Island has moved about 1,000 feet eastwardly over the last about 200 years, along with its changing process of shape, size and position due to erosion and tidal buildup.

== Habitat and diet ==
These voles dominate an open habitat of poison ivy (Toxicodendron radicans) and beach grass (Ammophilia breviligulata). Swaths of bare sand and saltwater marsh can be found on the island, but the voles tend to avoid these areas. They may burrow in loose sand or loose soil under or near any of their shelters. M. breweri feeds on beach grass stalks, leaves, seeds, and insect adults and larvae. Their predators include birds of prey such as the short-eared owl (Asio flammeus) and the northern harrier (Circus hudsonius). Cats were introduced onto Muskeget in the late 1800s, decimating the vole's population, but are no longer present. Their home range is usually less than one acre.

== Reproduction and behavior ==
Young beach voles are born in the burrow nests, underneath fragments of wreckage, or at the base of goldenrod (Solidago sp.). They do not demonstrate a typical vole breeding cycle, and show many of the attributes of a K-selected organism, such as large size, later age at maturation, sex ratio weighted towards the males, and low reproductive output. The adults can breed from the spring to the fall, and their gestation lasts for about one month. Every year, an individual female beach vole typically produces two litters of three to five offspring, but most will live for less than one year.

The beach voles have a habit of building runways above or in the ground under the beach grass, in order to better stay hidden from aerial predators. These runways may contain cut grass. During winter, underground tunnels become more common due to the cold weather.
