= William George Maton =

English physician

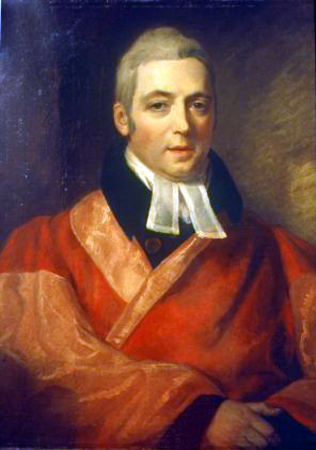
William George Maton

William George Maton M.D. (31 January 1774 – 30 March 1835) was an English physician, a society doctor who became associated with the British royal family. He published on natural history and antiquarian topics.

== Life ==
The son of George Maton, a wine merchant, was born at Salisbury, 31 January 1774. He attended Salisbury Grammar School, and in July 1790 entered The Queen's College, Oxford, graduating BA in 1794, MA in 1797, B.Med. in 1798, D.Med. in 1801.

While at Oxford, he became interested in botany, and encountered John Sibthorp. On 18 March 1794 Maton was elected a fellow of the Linnean Society, came to know the botanist Sir James Edward Smith. He became vice-president of the society; and the members showed their regard for him by calling a woodpecker, a shell-fish, and a genus of plants after him.

Maton undertook his medical studies at Westminster Hospital. He was elected a fellow of the College of Physicians of London on 30 September 1802, became Gulstonian lecturer in 1803, censor in 1804, 1813, and 1824, treasurer in 1814 to 1820, and Harveian orator in 1815. He was physician to the Westminster Hospital in 1800–8.

During the Weymouth "season" Maton used to practise there. One day, as he was out walking, an equerry summoned him to Queen Charlotte. She asked him to identify a specimen that one of the princesses fond of botany had obtained; he identified it as Calamagrostis epigejos. In this way he had an introduction to the royal family. In 1816 he was appointed physician extraordinary to Queen Charlotte, and in 1820 attended the Duke of Kent in his last illness. He afterwards became physician to the Duchess of Kent and to the infant Princess Victoria.

Maton's practice increased and was exceeded only by that of Sir Henry Halford. His father, who had died in 1816, was then deeply in debt, and by 1827 Maton had paid all that was owing. He bought a country seat near Downton, Wiltshire, but six months later became very ill, and died 30 March 1835 at his house in Spring Gardens, London.

== Works ==
In 1797 Maton published at Salisbury, in two volumes, Observations relative chiefly to the Natural History, Picturesque Scenery, and Antiquities of the Western Counties of England, made chiefly in the Years 1794 and 1796. The initial tour was made with his friend Charles Hatchett and Thomas Rackett the botanist. This is a record of travels in Dorset, Devon, Cornwall, and Somerset.

Maton published papers in the Transactions of the Linnean Society. In 1801, in the Medical and Physical Journal, he published a paper titled "Experiments and Observations Relative to Medicinal Barks", in which he described his discovery of the alkaline principle in Peruvian bark. He published on history: he wrote an account of a conventual seal found at Salisbury in the Gentleman's Magazine for 1792, and parts of the Salisbury Guide, and John Hutchins's History of Dorset, as well as a paper on Stonehenge in Archæologia for 1794. He published also three papers in the Transactions of the College of Physicians. His library was sold at auction in London by Wheatley on 21 May 1835 (and two following days); a copy of the sale catalogue is held at Cambridge University Library (shelfmark Munby.c.153(4)).

== Notes ==
Attribution

This article incorporates text from a publication now in the public domain: Lee, Sidney, ed. (1894). "Maton, William George". Dictionary of National Biography. Vol. 37. London: Smith, Elder & Co.
