= Helen Hays =

American ornithologist and conservationist (1931–2025)

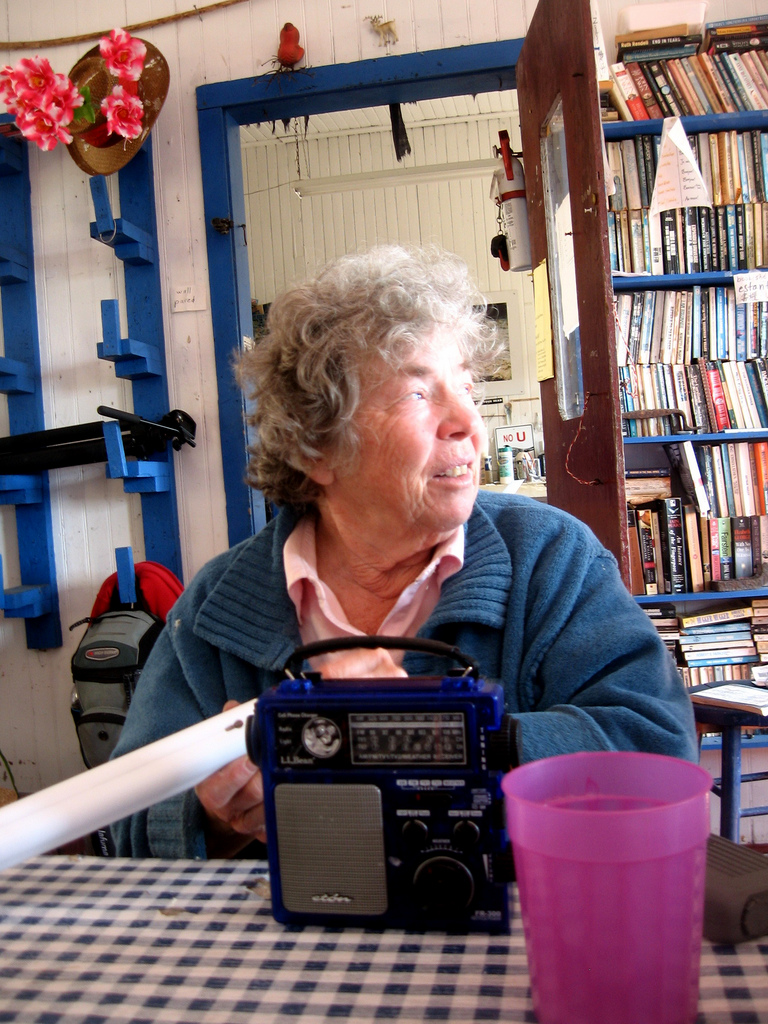
- Hays on Great Gull Island, 2009
- Born: January 22, 1931; Johnstown, New York, U.S.
- Died: February 5, 2025 (aged 94); Scarsdale, New York, U.S.
- Education: Wellesley College
- Occupation: Ornithologist
- Years active: 1956–2025
- Awards: Eisenmann Medal (1989); Honorary doctorate, University of Connecticut (2015)

Helen Hays (January 22, 1931 – February 5, 2025) was an American ornithologist and conservationist. Hays lived on Great Gull Island for six months of each year for almost a half-century as chair of the Great Gull Island committee at the American Museum of Natural History. By 2014, this work saw the island's tern population increase tenfold compared to the level of 1969.

== Early life ==
Helen Hays was born on January 22, 1931, in Johnstown, New York, and grew up there. She attended Wellesley College, graduating with a bachelor's degree in biology in 1953. She next conducted graduate work in Manitoba at Cornell University's Delta Waterfowl field station, but both Cornell and Wellesley refused to credit her with a master's degree for her work, studying ruddy duck breeding biology; Wellesley said her study was "not relevant". Nevertheless, her research into ruddy ducks was eventually published in the leading peer-reviewed ornithological journal in North America, The Auk, as well as the Handbook of North American Birds.

== Career ==
Without an advanced degree, Hays began her career in 1956 in low-level positions cataloguing specimens and performing secretarial work. In 1969 Hays made her first trip to Great Gull Island on Long Island Sound, which the American Museum of Natural History had recently purchased. At that time hunting, primarily for the hat trade, had greatly reduced the numbers of breeding pairs of common terns and roseate terns in North America. In 1969 Hays began spending six months of the year on the island working to restore the local population. Her tracking of the bird numbers and health also enabled her to raise an early warning about the harmful effects of PCBs.

Hays lived in Manhattan in the other portion of the year. During her stays on the island, she lived in former barracks and was assisted by other volunteer conservationists in her work. The researchers weigh the terns and help to monitor hatchlings and improve nesting conditions for them. As of 2014, over 26,000 terns nested on the island, more than 10 times the number when Hays started her work. She ended her annual trips to the island in 2020, amid the COVID-19 pandemic.

== Death ==
Hays died of complications from dementia in Scarsdale, New York, on February 5, 2025, at the age of 94. She never married and had no children.

== Awards ==
In 1985, President Ronald Reagan awarded the Great Gull Island Project the President's Volunteer Action Award Citation. Hays received the Conservation Service Award from the United States Department of the Interior, the Lifetime Achievement Award from the New York chapter of the National Audubon Society, and an Alumnae Achievement Award from Wellesley. In 2015, the University of Connecticut conferred an honorary doctorate of science upon her. In 2021, a documentary film titled Full Circle was completed about Helen and the island, winning several awards.
