= Dicky Mayes =

English cricketer

Personal information
- Full name: Richard Mayes
- Born: 7 October 1922; Littlebourne, Kent
- Died: 10 July 2013 (aged 90); Woolverstone, Suffolk
- Batting: Right-handed
- Relatives: Brian Mayes (son)

Domestic team information
- Years: Team
- 1947–1953: Kent
- 1957–1963: Suffolk
- FC debut: 11 June 1947 Kent v Northants
- Last FC: 5 August 1953 Kent v Middlesex

Career statistics
Competition	First-class
Matches	80
Runs scored	2,689
Batting average	19.62
100s/50s	4/7
Top score	134
Balls bowled	60
Wickets	0
Bowling average	–
5 wickets in innings	–
10 wickets in match	–
Best bowling	–
Catches/stumpings	28/–
- Source: CricInfo, 2 June 2016

Richard Mayes (7 October 1922 – 10 July 2013), known as Dicky Mayes, was an English professional cricketer who played 80 first-class cricket matches for Kent County Cricket Club between 1947 and 1953. Mayes, who was considered a stylish batsman, later coached cricket and played for Suffolk County Cricket Club. He had served in World War II.

== Early life ==
Mayes was born at Littlebourne in Kent and joined the Kent staff at Canterbury in 1939. He played once for the county Second XI before the outbreak of World War II later in the year. Initially primarily a leg spin bowler, he returned to the game after serving in North Africa during the war as a batsman, partially as a result of playing cricket on hard pitches in Egypt his service.

== Cricket career ==
Mayes made his first-class cricket debut in 1947 against Northants at Gravesend. He played for the county First XI for the next seven seasons, making a total of 80 appearances for the side in first-class matches. His best seasons were in 1951, when he scored 719 runs, which he bettered the following season when he made 934. (Note: Kent County Cricket Club reported that Mayes had played 77 matches for the county and scored 889 runs in 1952. This contradicts reports in Wisden and from the Professional Cricketers' Association and totals from CricInfo and CricketArchive.) He scored four centuries for Kent at First XI level, making his first, a score of 133 against Hampshire, in 1951 before scoring three the following season, including his highest score of 134 against Sussex at Tunbridge Wells, during which he and Bill Murray-Wood set a record for the sixth-wicket at the ground which stood until 2010. He was awarded his county cap in 1952.

Although he was a "prolific scorer of runs" at Second XI level and considered a "stylish right-handed batsman", Mayes was considered a "bad starter" and he made 23 ducks during his career. He was released by Kent at the end of the 1953 season. He went on to become coach and groundsman at Woolverstone Hall School near Ipswich in Suffolk from 1957 to 1987 where he coached future England international Graham Barlow when he was a pupil at the school. He played for Suffolk County Cricket Club in the Minor Counties Championship between 1957 and 1963, making 57 appearances for the county and scoring 729 runs in 1959, at that point a record total for the county in a single season.

== Personal and later life ==
As well as cricket, Mayes played football semi-professionally for Ramsgate Town between 1947 and 1951 and for Canterbury City F.C.

Mayes lived in Chelmondiston in Suffolk after his retirement with his wife Violet. One of their sons, Brian, also played cricket for Suffolk. Mayes died in Suffolk in July 2013 aged 90.
