= Theodosius Forrest =

Theodosius Forrest (1728 – 1784) was an English author, balladeer, playwright and lawyer.

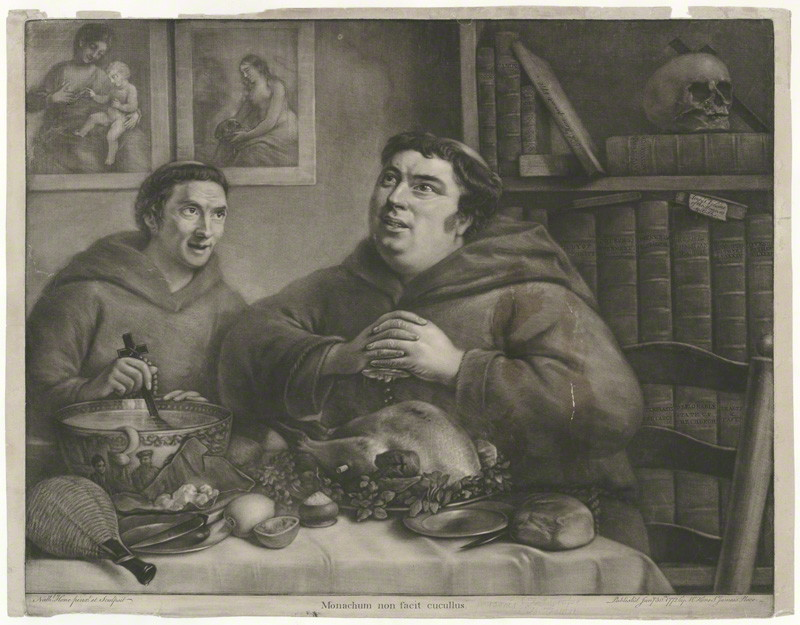
Theodosius Forrest as a monk, with Francis Grose

== Life ==
Forrest was the son of Ebenezer Forrest, a solicitor, born in London. He studied drawing under George Lambert, and until a year or two before his death exhibited at the Royal Academy annually from 1762 to 1781. He entered his father's business; and became a steady solicitor, though with a passion for music. He was a member of the Beefsteak Club, and associated with David Garrick and George Colman.

As solicitor to Covent Garden Theatre, Forrest was thrown in with the dramatic profession, and he composed a musical entertainment, The Weathercock, produced at Covent Garden 17 October 1775. It was said by John Genest to be "poor stuff". As a writer of songs, however, Forrest was more successful. He earned a reputation for the rendering of his own ballads.

Towards the close of his life Forrest was afflicted with a painful nervous disorder, attended with a black jaundice. He was thrown into a condition of deep melancholy, and on 5 November 1784 killed himself at his chambers in York Buildings, George Street, Westminster.
