= Brian Mayes (cricketer) =

English cricketer

Personal information
- Born: 11 April 1950 (age 76); Ramsgate, Kent
- Relatives: Dicky Mayes (father)

Domestic team information
- Years: Team
- 1969–1980: Suffolk

Career statistics
Competition	List A
Matches	1
Runs scored	13
Batting average	–
100s/50s	0/0
Top score	13*
Balls bowled	6
Wickets	0
Bowling average	–
5 wickets in innings	0
10 wickets in match	0
Best bowling	–
Catches/stumpings	0/–
- Source: Cricinfo, 6 July 2011

Brian Mayes (born 11 April 1950) is an English former cricketer who made one List A cricket appearance for Suffolk County Cricket Club in 1980.

Mayes was born at Margate in Kent where his father, Dicky Mayes, was a professional cricketer for Kent County Cricket Club, and educated at Ipswich School.

Mayes made his debut for Suffolk in the 1969 Minor Counties Championship, playing a total of 22 Championship matches in the tournament for the county between then and 1980. He made his only List A appearance against Sussex in the 1980 Gillette Cup.
