= Littlebourne =

Village in Kent, England

Coordinates: 51.2767°N 1.1672°E

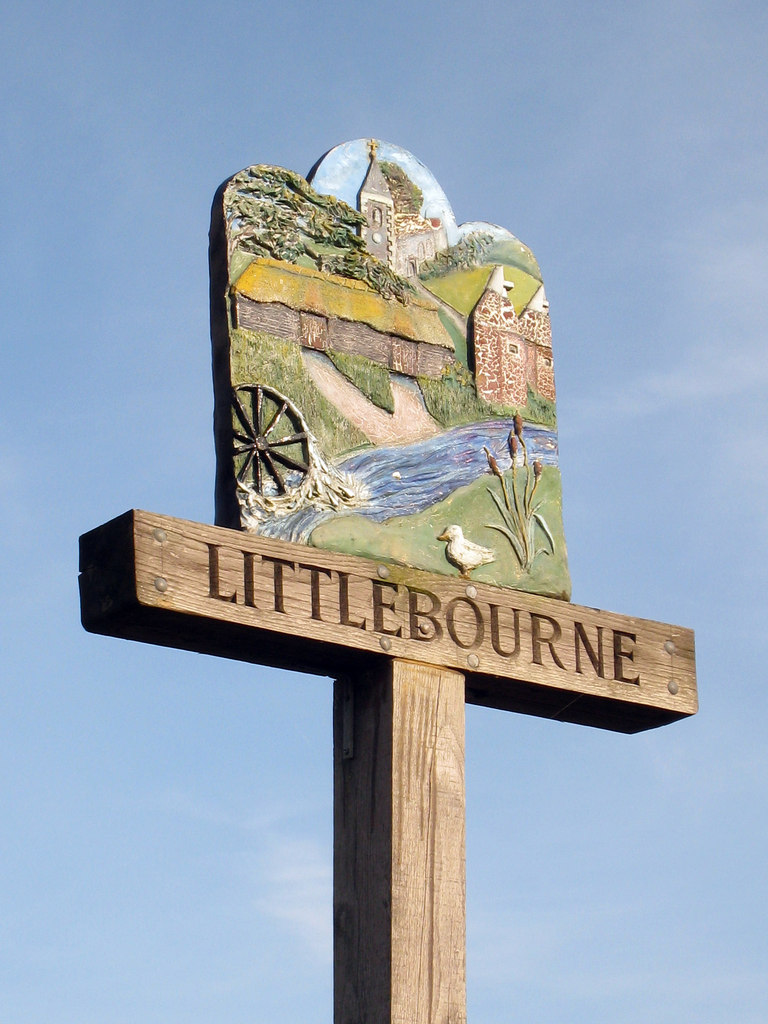

- Location within Kent
- Area: 8.52 km^{2} (3.29 sq mi)
- Population: 1,656
  - Density: 194/km^{2} (500/sq mi)
- OS grid reference: TR208574
- Civil parish: Littlebourne
- District: City of Canterbury
- Shire county: Kent
- Region: South East
- Country: England
- Sovereign state: United Kingdom
- Post town: CANTERBURY
- Postcode district: CT3
- Dialling code: 01227
- Police: Kent
- Fire: Kent
- Ambulance: South East Coast
- UK Parliament: Canterbury

Littlebourne is a village and civil parish 4 miles (6.4 km) east of Canterbury in Kent, South East England.

== Etymology ==
The suffix ‘Bourne’ comes from the Old English word ‘ brunna.’ The word means stream or small river. The full name translates to ‘little stream’ or ‘little river.’ In the Doomsday Book, ‘Littlebourne’ is written as ‘Liteburne.’

== History ==
Palaeolithic

Grassed under fruit trees and in brickearth soul, a gravel pit would contain 12 handaxes and a retouched flake dated to the Lower Palaeolithic. Captain L. Moysey discovered the collection in 1918 and the findings were sent by his mother to the British Museum.

Bronze Age

3 mid to late Bronze age urns were uncovered in 1925; found in a disused gravel pit in Olridge Wood and described as ‘bucket urns’.

Late Iron Age to Roman

A magnetometry geophysical survey identified a large enclosure and trackway dated to the late Iron Age and early Roman period. Three Roman coins were found in 1853 by a man digging out his garden. Two coins of Constantius I were found first, then weeks later, a coin of Claudius I. A hoard of three silver Roman denarii were discovered in 2021. The oldest coin depicted Antonius Pius, dated to 141 to 161 AD. The two other coins depicted Septimius Severus of between 195 to 197 AD.

Middle Ages

The Howletts Anglo-Saxon cemetery was discovered in 1913 when a gravel pit was opened up at Luddington Wood. The site held 36 or 42 graves and described as Jutish. Examinations of the graves performed ‘no trace of calcined bone or charcoal.’ Along the surface of the soil sat cremated remains. Much of the findings, including quoit brooches, became held in the British Museum. In 696 or 711, Widred of Kent gave 5 plough lands in Littlebourne to St Augustine’s Abbey.

Littlebourne is a settlement mentioned in the Domesday Book, which recorded population of 48 households with 35 villagers and 14 cottagers. St Augustine Abbey acted as lord to Littlebourne. There was a vineyard run by the monks from St Augustine. A word commonly used to measure vineyards, arpent, is used to refer to the land. During the early 14th century, land in Littlebourne would be granted to St Augustine's Abbey from landowners such as Philip de Intebergh, Walter Russel, John de Forester, John de Grove and Walter Hardy.

== Religious sites ==
St Vincent’s Church

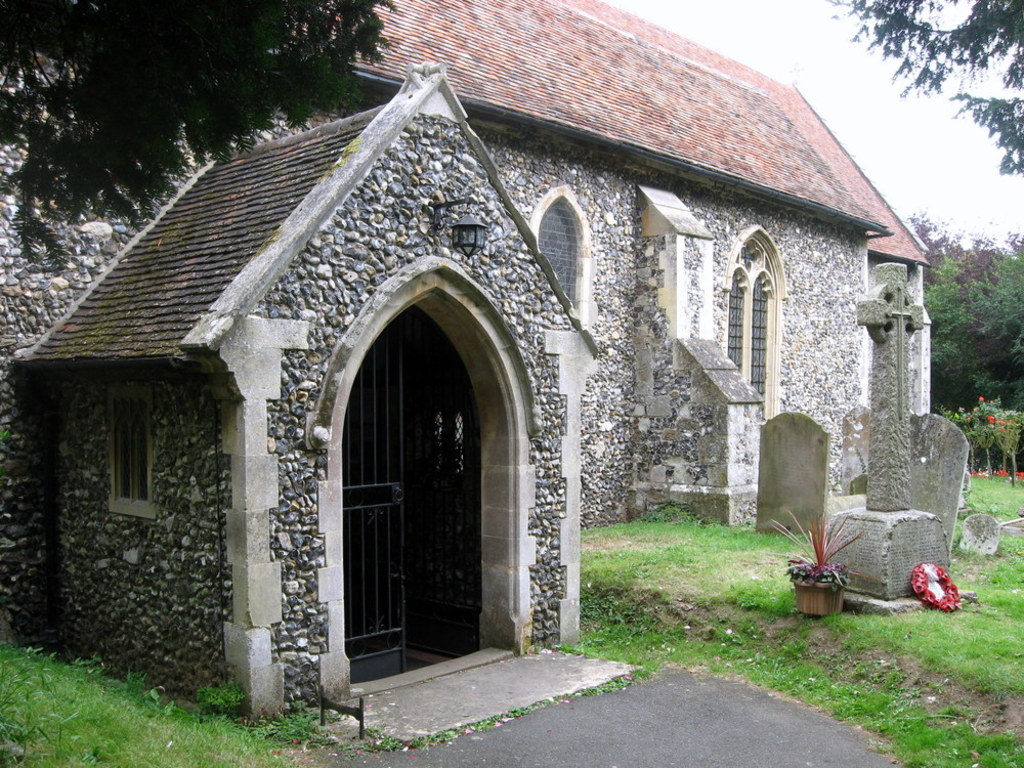
St. Vincent's Church, Littlebourne

Listed on the 30th January 1967, St Vincent’s Church is a grade I listed building of flint and Caen stone dressing. The church is named after Vincent of Saragossa, the patron saint of wine merchants and makers. Outside the south-west corner of the nave, Roman brick has been reused. The south arcade for the south aisle is dated to the early 13th century and four pointed arches in continuous flat. Vicarage was endowed in 1245. In the early 14th century, the south and north aisles outer walls were rebuilt. The patron was St. Augustine’s Abbey, then subsequently in 1538 handed to The Crown and later The Dean and Chapter of Canterbury in 1541. There are six church bells, with 3 dating to 1597, 1610 and 1650. The other three were recast in 1899. The Chanel received restoration during the 19th century, the date ‘1865’ on the rain water hoppers.

== Landmarks ==
Barn At Littlebourne Court

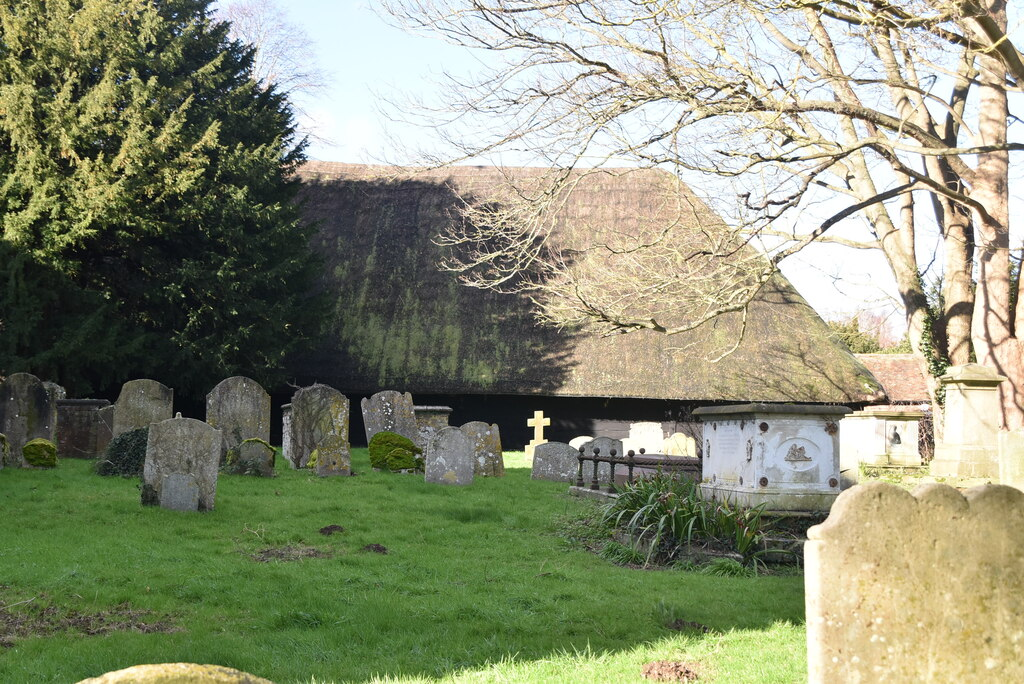
Barn, Littlebourne Court

Listed 30th of January 1967, Barn At Littlebourne Court is a grade I timber barn standing 172 feet long and 76 feet wide. In modern times, the space is used to organise events and rented out for weddings. There are an odd number of braces in the barn, a bay and a half removed at the southwest. The construction took place around 1340 on land owned by St Augustine’s Abbey. It is theorised to be built from under the instruction of Salamon of Ripple, a monk and warden for Littlebourne. In the 1960s, 2 hipped waggon entrances were added.

The Evenhill

The Evenhill is a pub that dates back to the 16th century as a cottage and a bar dating to the Victorian Era. In 1878, the pub would go to court over being open on a Sunday morning due to it being prohibited opening hours. Later, the case would be dismissed in court.

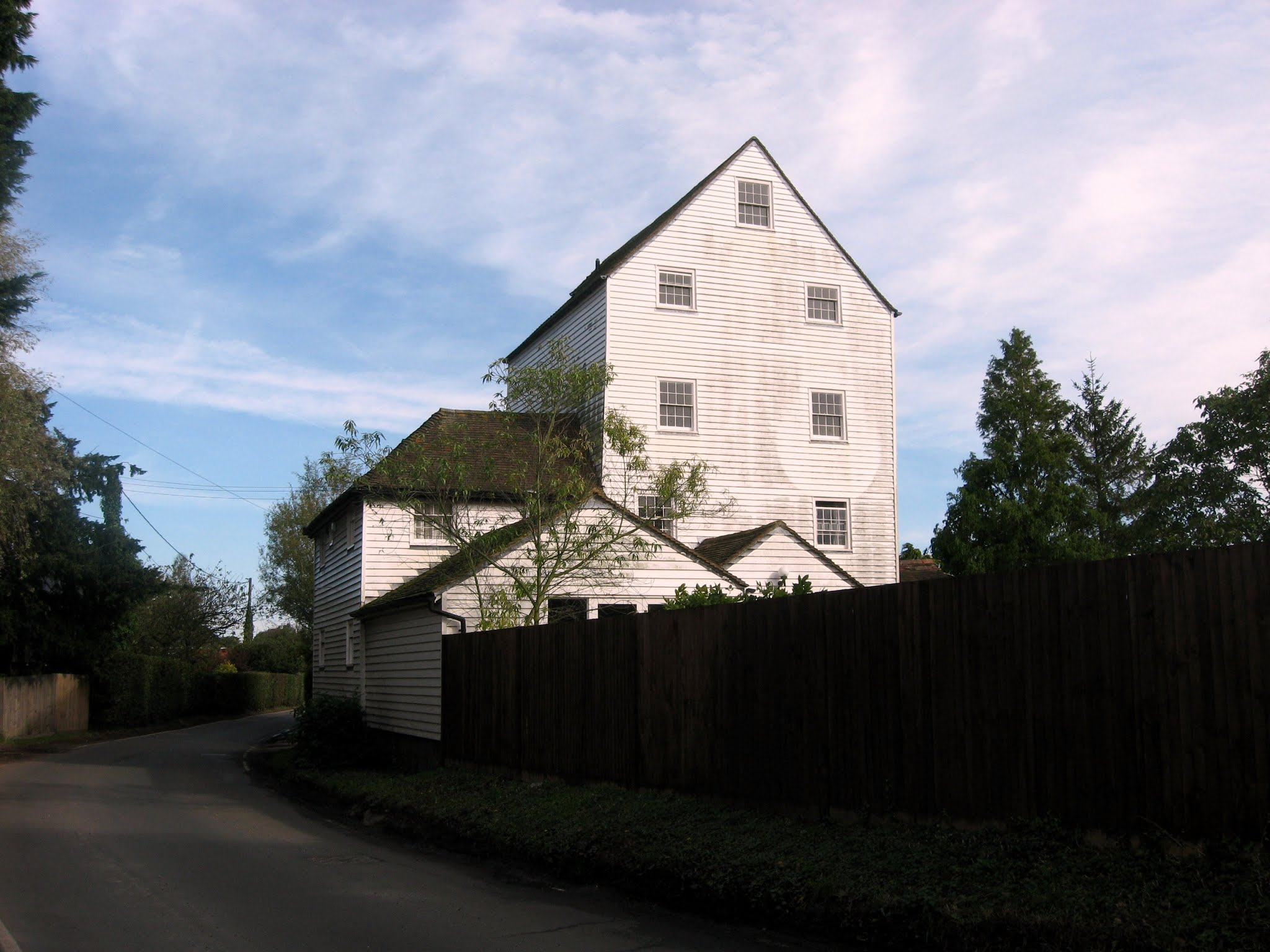
Littlebourne Watermill

Littlebourne Mill

Listed on 30th January 1967, Littlebourne Mill is a grade II water-powered corn mill along the River Stour. Dated to the 18th century, the main body of the mill is four stories tall and has smaller wings attached by the sided and front. The roof is tiled and an attic in the gable end. Painted in a coat of white, the upper stories have exterior weatherboarding. The mill would be seen in a water-coloured artwork by Aubrey Wakefield, titled ‘Dutch Mill at Littlebourne'. The piece would be part of a larger collection to showcase the home front and rally up national pride during the Second World War.

== Natural History ==
Littlebourne sits on the North Kent Plains, with the landscape a mix of mostly soft rock lowlands and a line of river valley landcover east of the village. Northwest of the village is a sandstone ground quality and to the southeast is chalk. A mixed drift has clay brickearth at the western with the eastern of sand and gravel. 2 small clusters are terraced river gravel drift. Around the village is a biodiversity opportunity for lower stour wetlands and small spots for local wildlife sites within them

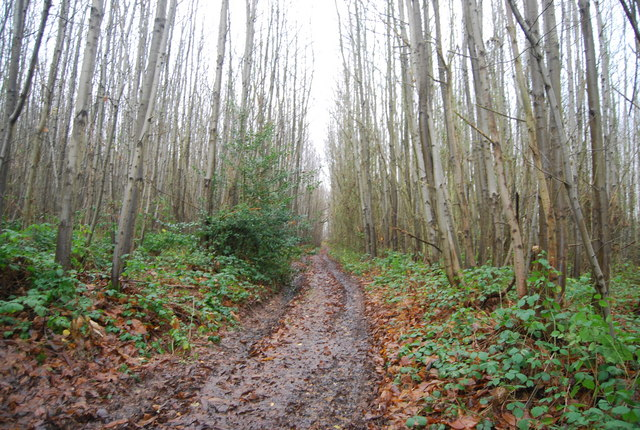
Trenley park Wood

Trenley Deer Park

Trenley Park is one of the oldest deer parks in Kent and first mentioned in a charter dated 1071 to 1082. The park would be recorded under 300 acres and calculations estimate closer to 267 acres. Bishop Odo would give Christ Church, Canterbury, four denarius in exchange for 25 acres within the park. Trenley Deer Park would appear in Sir Christopher Hatton's 'Book of Seals' with a now lost but unique seal of Odo of Bayeux. Commonly found birds is the wood pigeon, great tit, robin and carrion crow. Rarely, the red conservation status swift and the amber conservation status tundra bean goose may be spotted. The main bird of prey is the kestrel and sightings of skylarks and the tawny owl less common. Common smoothdap, bank haircap and swan’s-neck thyme-moss are recorded in the area. Besides maybe humans, the grey squirrel is the most common mammal in the woodlands.

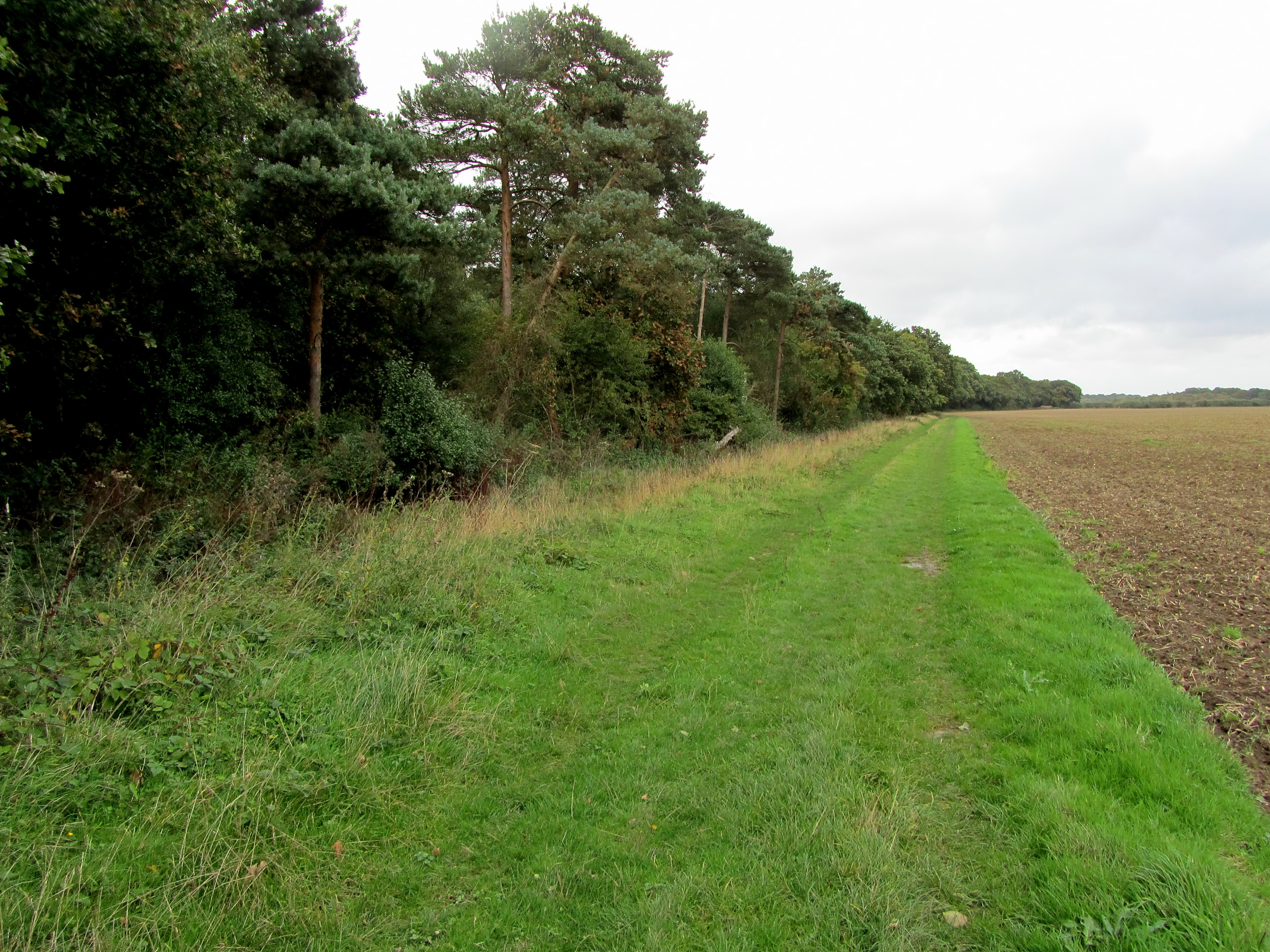
Edge of Oldridge Wood

Oldridge wood

Oldridge wood is a 100 acre ancient broadleaved woodland of tree species such as oak, beech, and ash. Bluebell can be found. The most commonly spotted birds are robins, chaffinch and great tit. Bat species such as Soprano Pipistrelle can be found. There is an invasive Jenkins Spire Snail population. A landfill license would be issued on 22nd March 1977 by Kent County Council. 1.14 hectares In size, the landfill would contain hazardous materiel, inert waste, commercial waste, household waste and sludge. The site would be closed in 2002, with the last waste input in June 2002.

== Demographics ==
In 2024, the population of Littlebourne was 1,656 people, with 10 live births and 14 deaths. In 2021, there were a reported 667 households. There are more people who identify as female than male, at 53% to 47%. Around 92% of residents are born in the UK. Mixed or multiple ethnic groups are the largest minority ethnic group (2.8%), and Black, Black British, Black Welsh, Caribbean or African are second (1.4%.) More than half the population identifies as Christian, and 38.8% identify as none. Little more than half are married or in a civil partnership, and 27% have never married or been in a registered relationship. 67.3% of households are single family households, and 27.6% are one-person.

== Politics ==
Littlebourne was in the hundred of Downhamford, as stated in the Doomsday Book. In 1894, Littlebourne was part of the Bridge Rural District (RD). The district merged with the Blean Rural District in 1934 to form the Bridge-Blean Rural District. The district was abolished in April 1974 under the Local Government Act 1972 and absorbed by Canterbury Council. Littlebourne became part of the Little Stour and Adisham Ward in 2015. The Littlebourne local parish office is located on the 58 High Street and has 9 local parish councillors.

== Education ==
Littlebourne Church of England Primary School is a mixed primary school located in Littlebourne for ages 4 to 11. In May of 2019, the school was rated ‘good’ by Ofsted inspectors. In the 2021 Census, around 16.8% of people identified as in some form of full time education, lower than the UK average of 20.4%.

== Transport ==
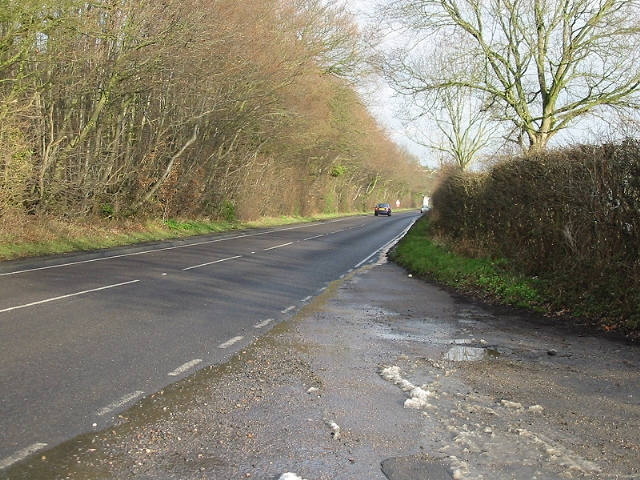
A257 looking east towards Littlebourne

The A257 Littlebourne Road is a major a-road in Littlebourne, connecting it to Canterbury 4 miles (6.4 km) and Sandwich 8.6 miles (13.9 kilometres.) The main local bus service is Stagecoach South East and operates along routes 43, 43A, 44 and 11. There is a charging station for EV vehicles on Orchard Close. The nearest is Shell in Wingham Green 2.6 miles (4.3 km.) In 2021, issues arose with cars parking by the junction on Church Road and forcing drivers into the middle of the road when turning left. In 2023, a traffic review was held by the Littlebourne Parish Council. In the same meetings, concerns were put forward of motorbikes cutting from The Laurels via the public footpath to St Vincents Church.

In 2025, Cars mounted on the pavement between The Maltings and Orchard Close resulted in a pedestrian nearly being hit. There was a 20mph speed limit implemented on the side roads of Littlebourne in the October. In June 2026, the A257 was shut in both directions between Swanton Lane and Littlebourne due to a car hitting the power cables in a collision, resulting in the line toppling over. Electricity to the surrounding properties would be temporarily cut and engineers from UKPN were sent out.

== Notable people ==
Phil Spencer (television personality)

William Gostling

Dicky Mayes

John Denne
