= Thomas Rackett =

English clergyman

Thomas Rackett (1757–1840) was an English clergyman, known as an antiquary.

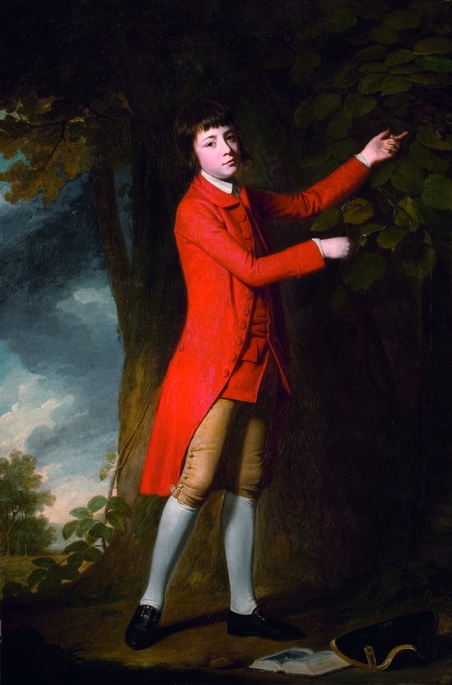
Thomas Rackett, 1768 portrait as a boy by George Romney in a declamatory pose. At the age of 14 he recited to David Garrick the latter's ode for the Shakespearean jubilee and Garrick presented him with a gilt copy of it. Next year (1771) Garrick gave him a folio copy of Shakespeare with a laudatory inscription.

== Life ==
He was son of Thomas Rackett of Wandsworth, Surrey. Theodosius Forrest and Paul Sandby taught Rackett drawing. John Hunter interested him in natural history. He matriculated at University College, Oxford, on 16 November 1773, and graduated B.A. in 1777 and M.A. in 1780.

In 1780, also, Rackett became rector of Spetisbury with Charlton-Marshall, in Dorset, and held the living for more than 60 years. He had multiple interests besides his parish, and was a musician. He concentrated on antiquarian researches, and spent time on scientific study in London. He came to know Richard Gough, Edward King, Richard Colt Hoare and William Lisle Bowles. He helped John Hutchins in the second edition of his History of Dorset, and rambled on his pony over the whole of the county. Late in life he collected and took casts of ancient seals and coins. In 1794 and 1796 he accompanied Charles Hatchett and William George Maton in a tour through the western counties and collected minerals. When an octogenarian he was studying conchology, and, with Tiberius Cavallo, to whom he offered a home at Spetisbury, pursued astronomy.

Rackett was a fellow of the Royal Society, of the Society of Antiquaries of London, and of the Linnean Society. He died at Spetisbury on 29 November 1840.

== Works ==
Rackett wrote:

- A Description of Otterden Place and Church and of the Archiepiscopal Palace at Charing in the county of Kent; accompanied by Genealogical Memoirs of the Family of Wheler and Anecdotes of some of the early Experiments in Electricity, London, 1832. He drew the frontispiece of Otterden Place and also the view of the palace. This work, written to please Mrs. Wheler, his niece, first appeared as an essay in the Gentleman's Magazine, 1832.
- An Historical Account of Testaceological Writers, with William George Maton, published in Transactions of the Linnean Society.

== Family ==
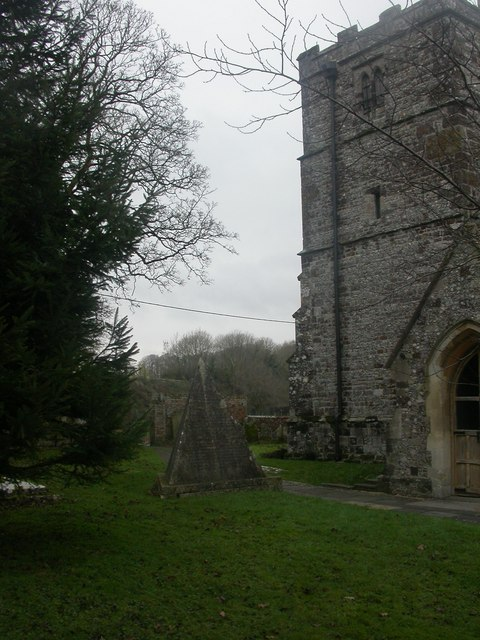
Rackett monument, Spetisbury, commemorating Thomas and Dorothea Rackett

Rackett married, in 1781, Dorothea, daughter of James Tattersall, rector of St. Paul's, Covent Garden, and of Streatham. All his children predeceased him except Dorothea, wife of S. Solly of Heathside, near Poole, Dorset.

== Notes ==
Attribution

This article incorporates text from a publication now in the public domain: Lee, Sidney, ed. (1896). "Rackett, Thomas". Dictionary of National Biography. Vol. 47. London: Smith, Elder & Co.
