= Little Gull Island Light =

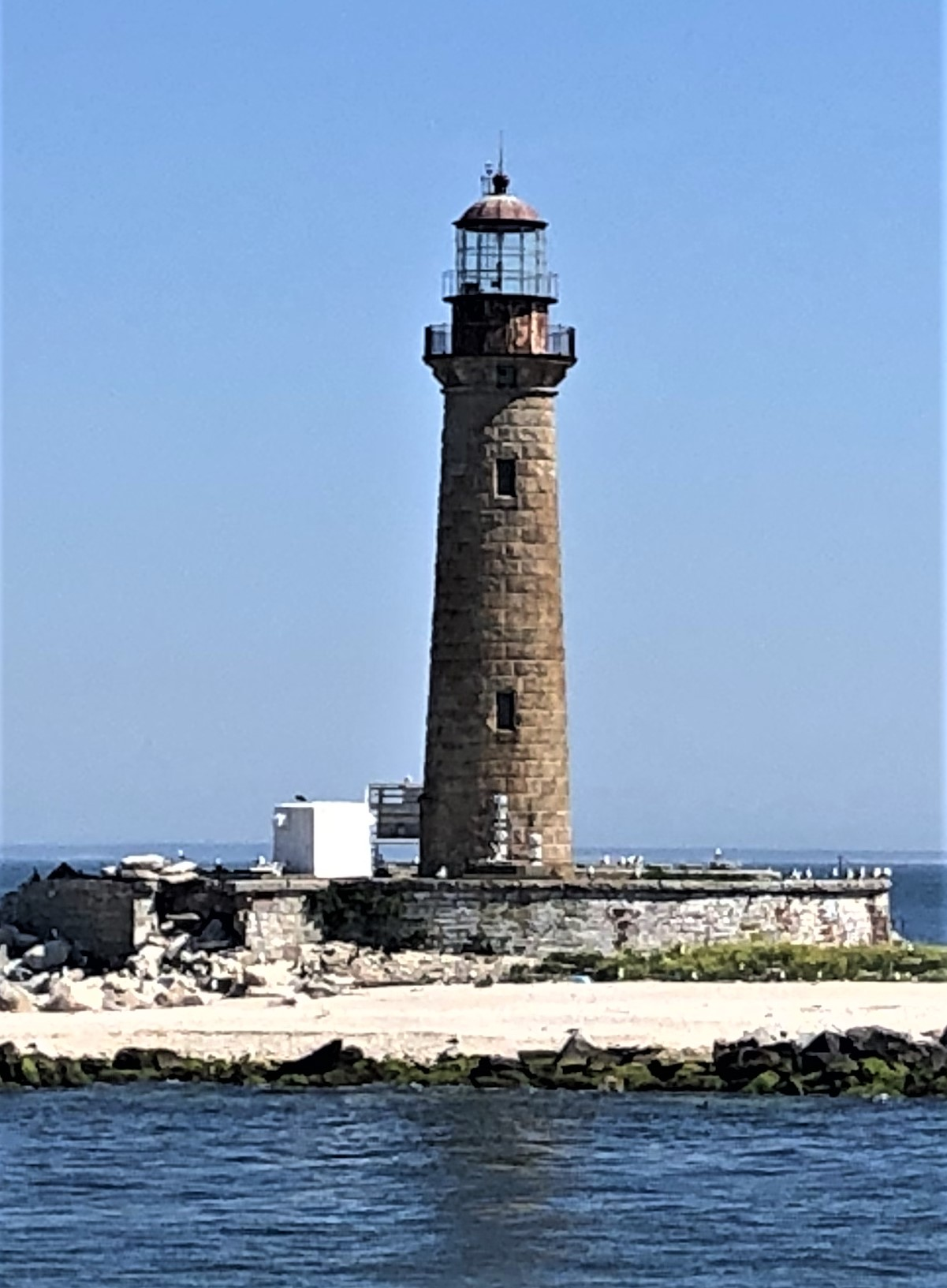
- (2022)
- Location: off Fisher's Island, New York in Long Island Sound
- Coordinates: 41°12′23″N 72°06′25″W

Tower
- Constructed: 1806
- Foundation: Granite
- Construction: Gray granite tower, attached to red dwelling on pier
- Automated: 1978
- Height: 81 feet (25 m)
- Shape: Conical Tower
- Markings: Natural
- Fog signal: 1 blast ev 15s (2s bl)

Light
- First lit: 1869
- Focal height: 91 feet (28 m)
- Lens: Second Order Fresnel lens
- Range: 18 nautical miles (33 km; 21 mi)
- Characteristic: 2 Flashing White, 15 secs

Little Gull Island Light is a lighthouse on Little Gull Island, a small island in Long Island Sound, located approximately 0.4 miles (0.6 km) northeast of Great Gull Island. Both islands are located in the Town of Southold, in Suffolk County, New York, and lie roughly midway between Plum Island and Fishers Island. Little Gull Island is approximately 4.6 miles (7.4 km) southwest of Fishers Island and the channel of water between them is the main entrance to Long Island Sound, known as "The Race".

The lighthouse, which was built in 1869 and automated in 1978, occupies much of the rocky island, which is only about 1-acre (4,000 m^{2}) in size.

== History ==
The first lighthouse was a 51-foot (16 m) high tower established in 1806, which was replaced by the current 81-foot (25 m) conical tower and a second order Fresnel lens in 1869. The lighthouse was automated in 1978 and is still operational. The foundation is a granite pier and the construction material is granite.

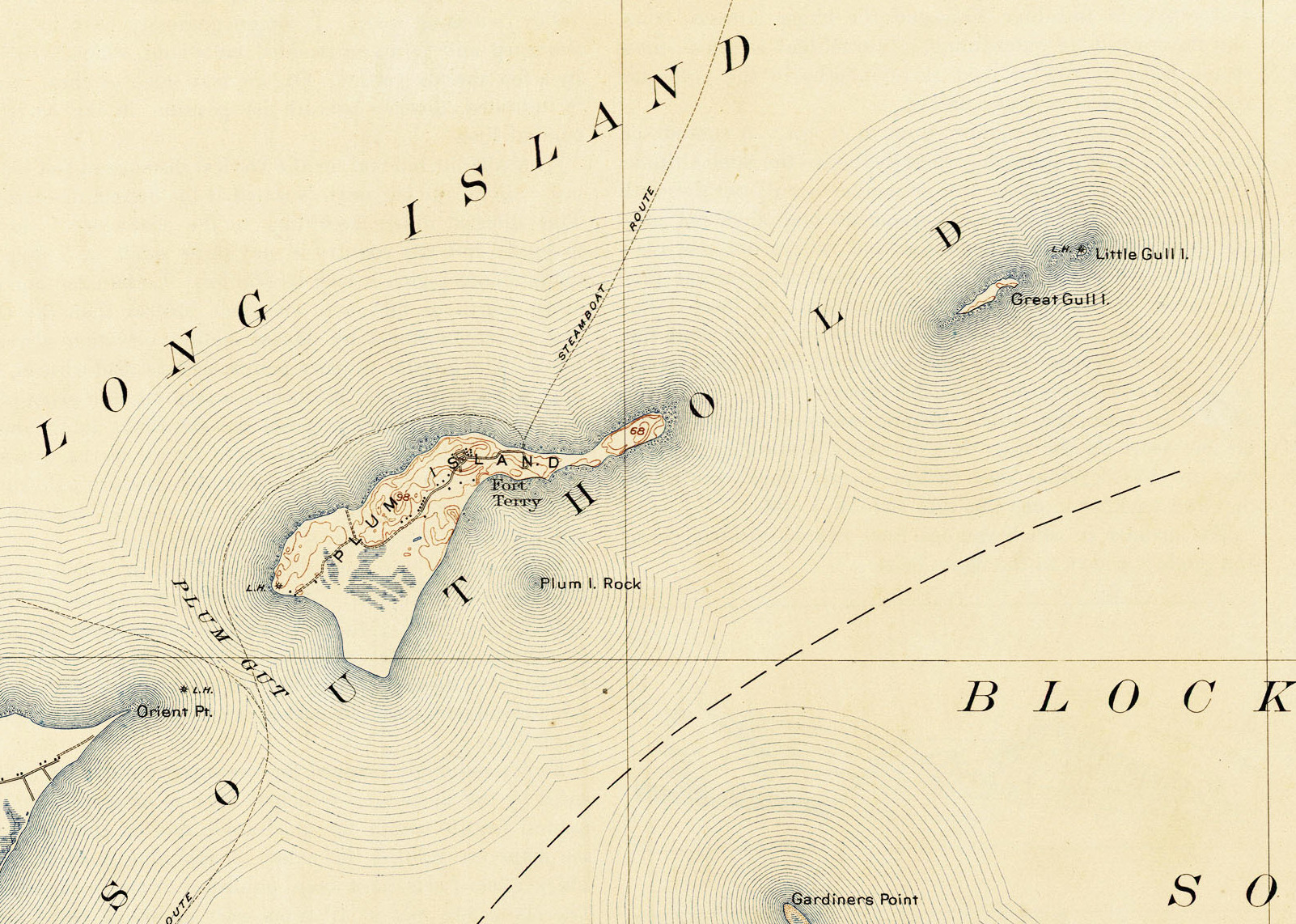
Excerpt of 1904 USGS Map, Little Gull Island is in upper right portion. Westward lies Plum Island, and Orient Point at the bottom left.

In 1813, the light was extinguished by a group of Royal Marines in a raid led by Commodore Thomas Hardy during the War of 1812.

On May 12, 1881, the Galatea, bound from Providence, Rhode Island to New York, ran aground in the calm due to the dense fog. Two days later, the ship was able to get off the island without damage. The Lighthouse Board opened an investigation because it was suspected that the fog signal was not operational during that time. The naval officer in charge of the investigation, French Ensor Chadwick, spent time questioning witnesses and others who might have heard the signal, and tested the signal at various locations around Little Gull Island. He concluded that the fog signal was operational during the time as the signal was heard at Mystic, Connecticut and by a tug boat that was farther away than the Galatea, and that the aberrations and eccentricities around Little Gull were even more significant than around Beavertail Lighthouse where sound tests were run later in 1881.

The United States Coast Guard has designated Little Gull Island Light as an Historic Light Stations in New York.

In 2009 Little Gull Island Light was put up for sale under the National Historic Lighthouse Preservation Act. Eight bids up to $381,000 were received. The sale for $381,000 broke the record for the highest bid received to that date under the National Historic Lighthouse Preservation Act.

Little Gull Island Light is shown on the NOAA Chart 12354

== In popular culture ==
The Archives Center at the Smithsonian National Museum of American History has a collection (#1055) of souvenir postcards of lighthouses and has digitized 272 of these and made them available online. These include postcards of Little Gull Island Light with links to customized nautical charts provided by National Oceanographic and Atmospheric Administration.
