= Great Gull Island =

Island in Suffolk County, New York, United States

Coordinates: 41°12′07″N 72°07′09″W

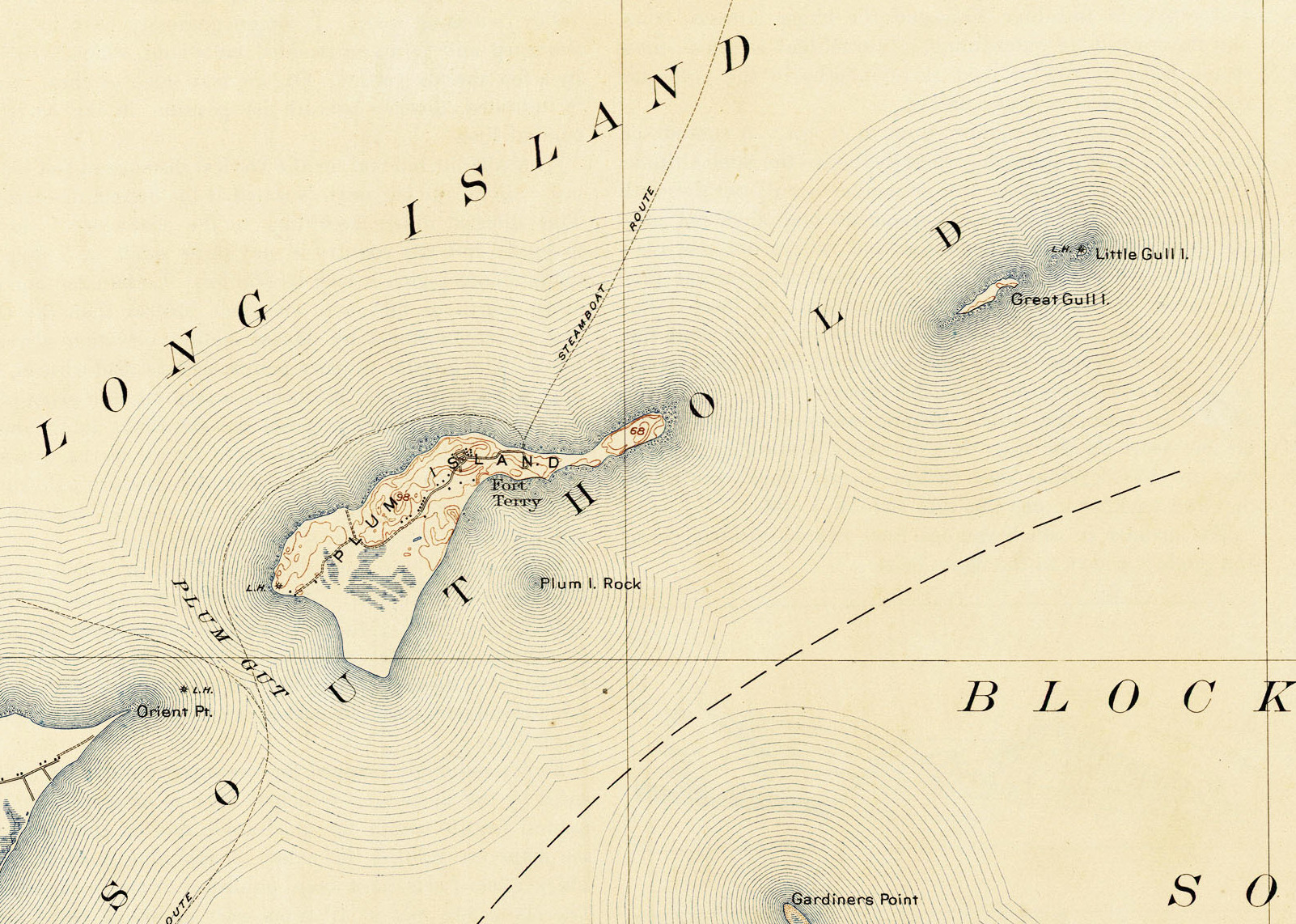
Excerpt of 1904 USGS Map, Great Gull Island is in upper right portion. Westward lies Plum Island, and Orient Point at the bottom left.

Great Gull Island is a 17-acre (6.9 ha) island separating the Long Island and Block Island sounds, located approximately 0.4 miles (0.6 km) southwest of Little Gull Island. Both islands are located in the town of Southold in Suffolk County, New York, and lie roughly midway between Plum Island and Fishers Island. The island is the location of former military fortifications, but is now owned by the American Museum of Natural History which is working to restore its ecosystem. It hosts many nesting Common and Roseate terns.

== History ==
Gull Island is a major stopover for birds following the Atlantic Flyway and was the home of large colonies of nesting terns up until the end of the 19th century, when many birds were killed as a result of the millinery trade and the construction of military fortifications on the island. In 1897, Fort Michie was constructed on Great Gull Island as part of the Coast Defenses of Long Island Sound. The military base was operational from the Spanish–American War through World War II. It included one of the largest gun installations in the United States, an emplacement for a 16-inch gun on a disappearing carriage.

Great Gull Island was acquired by the American Museum of Natural History on March 31, 1949. It marked the beginning of the Great Gull Island Project, a long-term effort by staff from the museum and other volunteers to restore the island's ecosystem. Gradually, terns began returning to the island to nest, and the population grew into one of the largest colonies in the world for two species of terns.

In 2021 a documentary was produced about the island and its researchers called “Full Circle”.

== Terns ==
The dominant faunal feature of the island during the summer months is the active Common Tern (Sterna hirundo) colony spread across the flatter areas of the island that are not taken over by bittersweet (Celastrus) or common reed (Phragmites australis). A tentative estimation of the S. hirundo mating pairs present on the island estimates their number at 9,500.

The other major avian on Great Gull Island is the Roseate Tern (Sterna dougallii), which mostly inhabit the ring of boulders that cover the edges of the island. Originally, these boulders were arranged to prevent erosion and were placed there by the United States Army. However, the Roseates are well suited to the narrow crevices and hard-to-reach spaces created in this environment, with their young quite adept at vanishing in between the rocks, only becoming accessible when a parent calls to summon them. The population of S. dougallii populating the island is estimated be around 1,300 mating pairs, though no complete census is available.

== Personnel ==
The founder and director of the Great Gull Island Project was Helen Hays, who managed the island from 1969 until her retirement in 2020. Joe DiCostanzo is responsible for running the database detailing the family history, hatching records, and nest location of many of the birds hatched on or visiting the island.

The Great Gull Island Program has an ongoing partnership with several Argentine projects that monitor the terns during the winter and spring months. Occasionally, as a show of support, an Argentine delegation will arrive to assist in preparation work for "peak week", when hatchings-per-day can range into the thousands. In recognition of their contribution, the west end of the island is thus named "Little Argentina".
