= Kailali 3 =

Parliamentary constituency in Nepal

- Parliamentary constituency for the House of Representatives
- Kailali 3 in Sudurpashchim Province; Protected areas in green

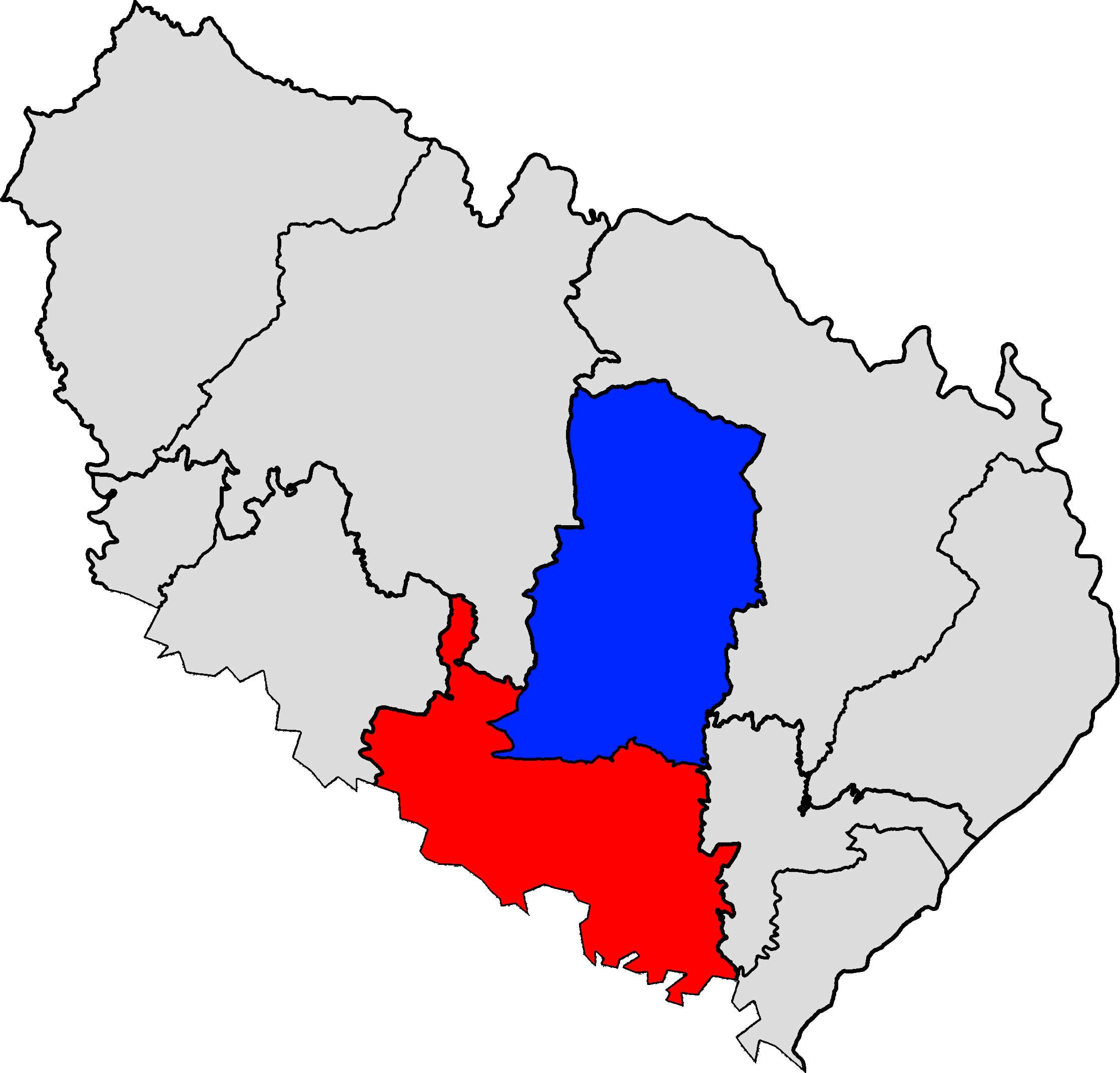
- Assembly segments Kailali 3(A) (red) and Kailali 3(B) within Kailali District
- Province: Sudurpashchim Province
- District: Kailali District
- Electorate: 91,833

Current constituency
- Created: 1991
- Party: Rastriya Swatantra Party
- MP: Jagat Prasad Joshi
- Sudurpashchim MPA 3(A): Birman Chaudhary (NCP)
- Sudurpashchim MPA 3(B): Amar Bahadur Saud (NCP)

Kailali 3 is one of five parliamentary constituencies of Kailali District in Nepal. This constituency came into existence on the Constituency Delimitation Commission (CDC) report submitted on 31 August 2017.

== Incorporated areas ==
Kailali 3 incorporates Ghodaghodi Municipality, Bhajani Municipality and wards 1–5, 7 and 8 of Kailari Rural Municipality.

== Assembly segments ==
It encompasses the following Sudurpashchim Provincial Assembly segment

- Kailali 3(A)
- Kailali 3(B)

== Members of Parliament ==
=== Parliament/Constituent Assembly ===
Election	Member	Party
1991	Tek Bahadur Chokhal	Nepali Congress
1994	Chakra Chaudhary	CPN (Unified Marxist–Leninist)
1999	Pushkar Nath Ojha	Nepali Congress
2008	Bir Man Chaudhary	CPN (Maoist)
January 2009	Bir Man Chaudhary	UCPN (Maoist)
2013	Ram Janam Chaudhary	Madheshi Janaadhikar Forum, Nepal (Democratic)
April 2017	Ram Janam Chaudhary	Nepal Loktantrik Forum
2017	Gauri Shankar Chaudhary	CPN (Maoist Centre)
May 2019	Gauri Shankar Chaudhary	Nepal Communist Party
2022	Ganga Ram Chaudhary	Nagrik Unmukti Party
2026	Jagat Prasad Joshi	Rastriya Swatantra Party

=== Provincial Assembly ===
==== 3(A) ====
Election	Member	Party
2017	Birman Chaudhary	CPN (Maoist Centre)
May 2019	Birman Chaudhary	Nepal Communist Party

==== 3(B) ====
Election	Member	Party
2017	Amar Bahadur Saud	CPN (Unified Marxist–Leninist)
May 2018	Amar Bahadur Saud	Nepal Communist Party
March 2021	Amar Bahadur Saud	CPN (Unified Marxist–Leninist)
August 2021	Amar Bahadur Saud	CPN (Unified Socialist)

== Election results ==
=== Election in the 2020s ===
==== 2022 general election ====
Candidate	Party	Votes	%
Ganga Ram Chaudhary	Nagrik Unmukti Party	23,120	38.71
Krishna Kumar Chaudhary	CPN (Maoist Centre)	17,749	29.72
Gauri Shankar Chaudhary	CPN (UML)	9,874	16.53
Birendra Bahadur Bam	Rastriya Prajatantra Party	7,045	11.80
Others		1,931	3.23
Total		59,719	100.00
Majority		5,371	
Nagrik Unmukti Party gain			

=== Election in the 2010s ===
==== 2017 legislative elections ====
Party	Candidate	Votes
CPN (Maoist Centre)	Gauri Shankar Chaudhary	24,879
Nepali Congress	Ram Janam Chaudhary	20,494
Rastriya Janata Party Nepal	Mina Chaudhary	4,044
CPN (Marxist–Leninist)	Parek Bahadur Rawal	3,255
Naya Shakti Party, Nepal	Dilli Raj Jaishi	1,917
Unified Rastriya Prajatantra Party (Nationalist)	Prem Raj Chaudhary	1,197
Others		1,456
Invalid votes		4,786
Result	Maoist Centre gain	
Source: Election Commission

==== 2017 Nepalese provincial elections ====
===== 3(A) =====
Party	Candidate	Votes
CPN (Maoist Centre)	Birman Chaudhary	15,876
Nepali Congress	Puran Prasad Chaudhary	12,261
Naya Shakti Party, Nepal	Raja Ram Chaudhary	2,366
Rastriya Prajatantra Party (Democratic)	Jogi Ram Chaudhary	971
Invalid votes		1,870
Result	Maoist Centre gain	
Source: Election Commission

===== 3(B) =====
Party	Candidate	Votes
CPN (Unified Marxist–Leninist)	Amar Bahadur Saud	11,877
Nepali Congress	Laxman Bahadur Shahi	7,492
Naya Shakti Party, Nepal	Krishna Kumar Chaudhary	5,196
Rastriya Prajatantra Party (Democratic)	Ram Nath Chaudhary	1,237
Others		1,060
Invalid votes		1,841
Result	CPN (UML) gain	
Source: Election Commission

===== 2013 Constituent Assembly election =====
Party	Candidate	Votes
Madheshi Janaadhikar Forum, Nepal (Democratic)	Ram Janam Chaudhary	11,027
Nepali Congress	Narayan Dutt Mishra	9,748
Tharuhat Terai Party Nepal	Bhanu Ram Dagaura Tharu	7,970
UCPN (Maoist)	Sher Bahadur Chaudhary	7,063
CPN (Unified Marxist–Leninist)	Chandrika Prasad Chaudhary	1.951
Rastriya Prajatantra Party Nepal	Indra Kumar Malla	1.145
Others		4,341
Result	MJFN (D) gain	
Source: NepalNews

=== Election in the 2000s ===
==== 2008 Constituent Assembly election ====
Party	Candidate	Votes
CPN (Maoist)	Bir Man Chaudhary	19,739
Rastriya Prajatantra Party	Mohan Raj Malla	6,126
CPN (Unified Marxist–Leninist)	Hari Lal Chaudhary	5,381
Nepali Congress	Chandra Singh Bhattarai	5,324
Independent	Buddhi Sagar Chaudhary	4,776
CPN (Marxist–Leninist)	Dipendra Kumar B.K.	2,685
Madheshi Janaadhikar Forum, Nepal	Bandha Ram Dagaura Tharu	1,931
Others		2,444
Invalid votes		2,075
Result	Maoist gain	
Source: Election Commission

=== Election in the 1990s ===
==== 1999 legislative elections ====
Party	Candidate	Votes
Nepali Congress	Pushkar Nath Ojha	19,389
CPN (Unified Marxist–Leninist)	Dinesh Chandra Subedi	11,844
Rastriya Prajatantra Party	Asha Ram Chaudhary	10,454
Independent	Ram Samajh Chaudhary	2,337
CPN (Marxist–Leninist)	Yagya Raj Bastola	2,077
Others		1,650
Invalid Votes		2,027
Result	Congress gain	
Source: Election Commission

==== 1994 legislative elections ====
Party	Candidate	Votes
CPN (Unified Marxist–Leninist)	Chakra Chaudhary	13,883
Nepali Congress	Pushkar Nath Ojha	10,432
Rastriya Prajatantra Party	Cheda Lal Chaudhary	6,812
Independent	Chandra Bahadur Gurung	2,139
Independent	Ganesh Bahadur Deuba	1,308
Others		656
Result	CPN (UML) gain	
Source: Election Commission

==== 1991 legislative elections ====
Party	Candidate	Votes
Nepali Congress	Tek Bahadur Chokhal	17,478
CPN (Unified Marxist–Leninist)		13,253
Result	Congress gain	

== See also ==
- List of parliamentary constituencies of Nepal
