= Kailali 4 =

Parliamentary constituency in Nepal

- Parliamentary constituency for the House of Representatives
- Kailali 4 in Sudurpashchim Province; Protected areas in green

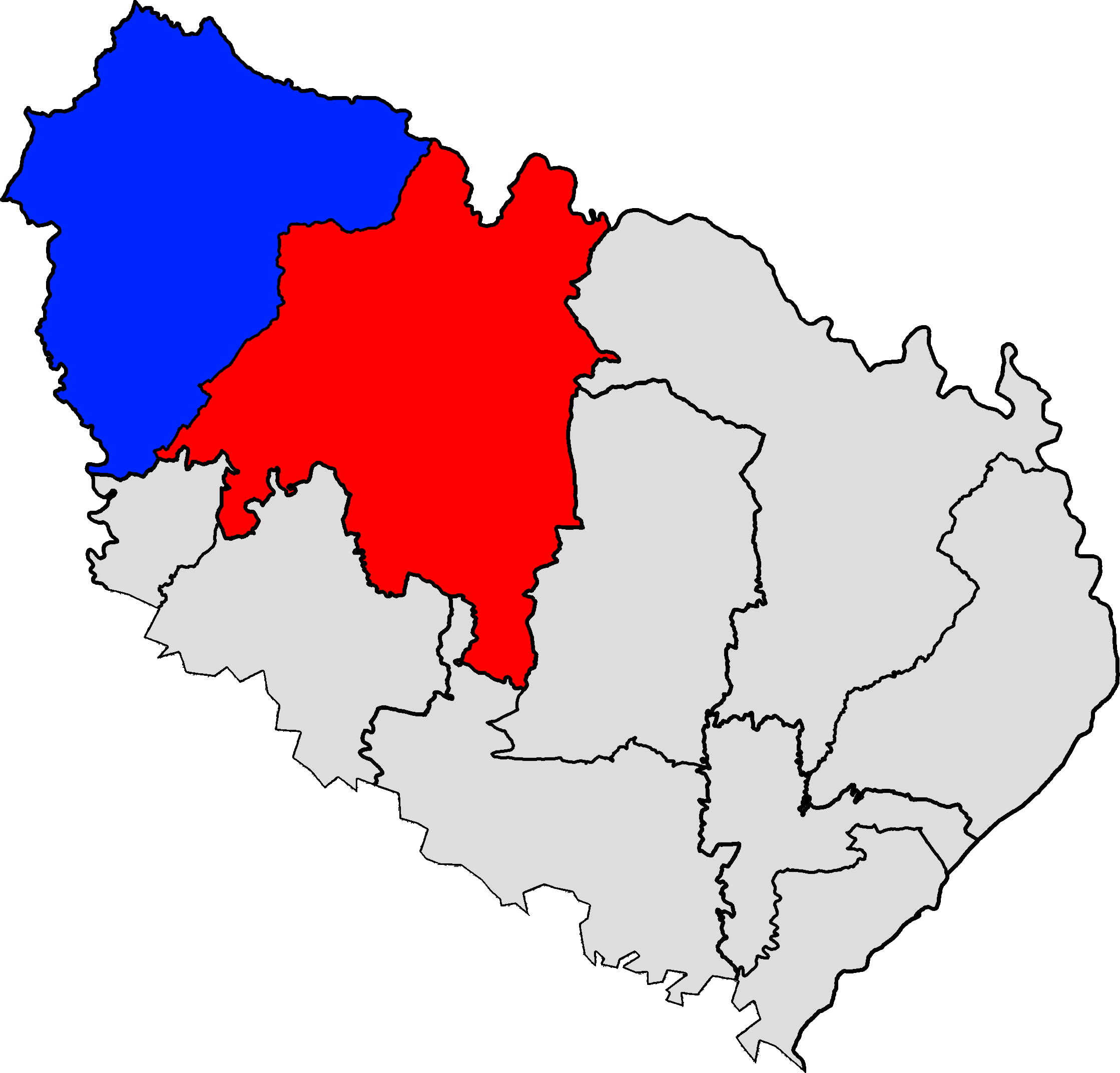
- Assembly segments Kailali 4(A) (red) and Kailali 4(B) within Kailali District
- Province: Sudurpashchim Province
- District: Kailali District
- Electorate: 93,384

Current constituency
- Created: 1994
- Party: Rastriya Swatantra Party
- MP: Khem Raj Koirala
- Sudurpashchim MPA 4(A): Dirgha Bahadur Sodari ( NCP )
- Sudurpashchim MPA 4(B): Prakash Bam (NC)

Kailali 4 is one of five parliamentary constituencies of Kailali District in Nepal. This constituency came into existence on the Constituency Delimitation Commission (CDC) report submitted on 31 August 2017.

== Incorporated areas ==
Kailali 4 incorporates Godawari Municipality, Chure Rural Municipality, ward 5 of Mohanyal Rural Municipality and Gauriganga Municipality.

== Assembly segments ==
It encompasses the following Sudurpashchim Provincial Assembly segment

- Kailali 4(A)
- Kailali 4(B)

== Members of Parliament ==
=== Parliament/Constituent Assembly ===
Election	Member	Party
1994	Maheshwar Pathak	CPN (Unified Marxist–Leninist)
1999	Tek Bahadur Chokhal	Nepali Congress
2008	Krishna Kumar Chaudhary	CPN (Maoist)
January 2009	Krishna Kumar Chaudhary	UCPN (Maoist)
2013	Gauri Shankar Chaudhary	UCPN (Maoist)
May 2016	Gauri Shankar Chaudhary	CPN (Maoist Centre)
2017	Lekh Raj Bhatta	CPN (Maoist Centre)
May 2019	Lekh Raj Bhatta	Nepal Communist Party
2022	Bir Bahadur Balayar	Nepali Congress
2026	Khem Raj Koirala	Rastriya Swatantra Party

=== Provincial Assembly ===
==== 4(A) ====
Election	Member	Party
2017	Dirgha Bahadur Sodari	CPN (Unified Marxist–Leninist)
May 2018	Dirgha Bahadur Sodari	Nepal Communist Party
March 2021	Dirgha Bahadur Sodari	CPN (Unified Marxist–Leninist)
August 2021	Dirgha Bahadur Sodari	CPN (Unified Socialist)

==== 4(B) ====
Election	Member	Party
2017	Krishna Raj Subedi	CPN (Unified Marxist–Leninist)
May 2018	Krishna Raj Subedi	Nepal Communist Party

== Election results ==
=== Election in the 2020s ===
==== 2026 general election ====
Candidate	Party	Votes	%
Khem Raj Koirala	Rastriya Swatantra Party	28,556	42.44
Gorakh Bahadur Bista	Nepali Congress	11,301	16.80
Kamal Rajwar	Rastriya Prajatantra Party	10,358	15.39
Lekh Raj Bhatta	CPN (UML)	9,444	14.04
Hari Ram Chaudhary	Nepali Communist Party	5,609	8.34
Others		2,015	2.99
Total		67,283	100.00
Valid votes		67,283	95.86
Invalid/blank votes		2,907	4.14
Total votes		70,190	100.00
Registered voters/turnout		115,143	60.96
Majority		17,255	
Rastriya Swatantra Party gain			

==== 2022 general election ====
Candidate	Party	Votes	%
Bir Bahadur Balayar	Nepali Congress	26,275	44.26
Lekh Raj Bhatta	CPN (UML)	22,663	38.17
Kaiya Chaudhary	Nagrik Unmukti Party	6,233	10.50
Gobinda Prasad Bhatta	Rastriya Swatantra Party	2,230	3.76
Jay Bahadur Dhami	Rastriya Prajatantra Party	1,470	2.48
Others		496	0.84
Total		59,367	100.00
Majority		3,612	
Nepali Congress gain			

=== Election in the 2010s ===
==== 2017 legislative elections ====
Party	Candidate	Votes
CPN (Maoist Centre)	Lekh Raj Bhatta	31,359
Nepali Congress	Sunil Kumar Bhandari	20,960
Independent	Gita Chhetri	3,173
Rastriya Janamorcha	Laxmi Ram Acharya	1,107
Others		1,461
Invalid votes		3,935
Result	Maoist Centre hold	
Source: Election Commission

==== 2017 Nepalese provincial elections ====
===== 4(A) =====
Party	Candidate	Votes
CPN (Unified Marxist–Leninist)	Dirgha Bahadur Sodari	16,115
Nepali Congress	Yagya Raj Chaudhary	11,425
Others		1,754
Invalid votes		1,761
Result	CPN (UML) gain	
Source: Election Commission

===== 4(B) =====
Party	Candidate	Votes
CPN (Unified Marxist–Leninist)	Krishna Raj Subedi	16,022
Nepali Congress	Hira Durra Bhatta	11,803
Others		1,430
Invalid votes		1,626
Result	CPN (UML) gain	
Source: Election Commission

===== 2013 Constituent Assembly election =====
Party	Candidate	Votes
UCPN (Maoist)	Gauri Shankar Chaudhary	11,968
Nepali Congress	Khem Raj Dagaura Tharu	8,610
CPN (Unified Marxist–Leninist)	Dirgha Bahadur Sodari	6,756
Rastriya Prajatantra Party	Birendra Bahadur Bam	4,170
Federal Socialist Party, Nepal	Hira Lal Chaudhary	2,928
Madheshi Janaadhikar Forum, Nepal (Democratic)	Chandra Kumar Chaudhary	2,602
CPN (Marxist–Leninist)	Khagendra Kumar Thagulla	1,044
Others		5,164
Result	Maoist hold	
Source: NepalNews

=== Election in the 2000s ===
==== 2008 Constituent Assembly election ====
Party	Candidate	Votes
CPN (Maoist)	Krishna Kumar Chaudhary	27,547
Nepali Congress	Narayan Dutta Mishra	8,367
CPN (Unified Marxist–Leninist)	Parbati Kumar Chaudhary	7,099
Rastriya Prajatantra Party	Dipendra Bahadur Shahi	2,484
Rastriya Janashakti Party	Aasha Ram Chaudhary	2,152
Others		1,767
Invalid votes		1,700
Result	Maoist gain	
Source: Election Commission

=== Election in the 1990s ===
==== 1999 legislative elections ====
Party	Candidate	Votes
Nepali Congress	Tek Bahadur Chokhal	17,998
CPN (Unified Marxist–Leninist)	Hanuman Chaudhary	11,907
Rastriya Prajatantra Party	Dhan Bahadur Bam	10,328
CPN (Marxist–Leninist)	Maheshwar Pathak	1,089
Rastriya Prajatantra Party (Chand)	Dhan Bahadur Shah	1,061
Others		1,449
Invalid Votes		1,557
Result	Congress gain	
Source: Election Commission

==== 1994 legislative elections ====
Party	Candidate	Votes
CPN (Unified Marxist–Leninist)	Maheshwar Pathak	9,594
Rastriya Prajatantra Party	Dhan Bahadur Bam	9,038
Nepali Congress	Tek Bahadur Chokhal	8,076
Independent	Ram Chandra Bhatta	3,230
Others		2,875
Result	CPN (UML) gain	
Source: Election Commission

== See also ==
- List of parliamentary constituencies of Nepal
