= Lamkichuha =

Lamki Chuha लम्की चुहा ल. चु. न पा
- Municipality (नगरपालिका)
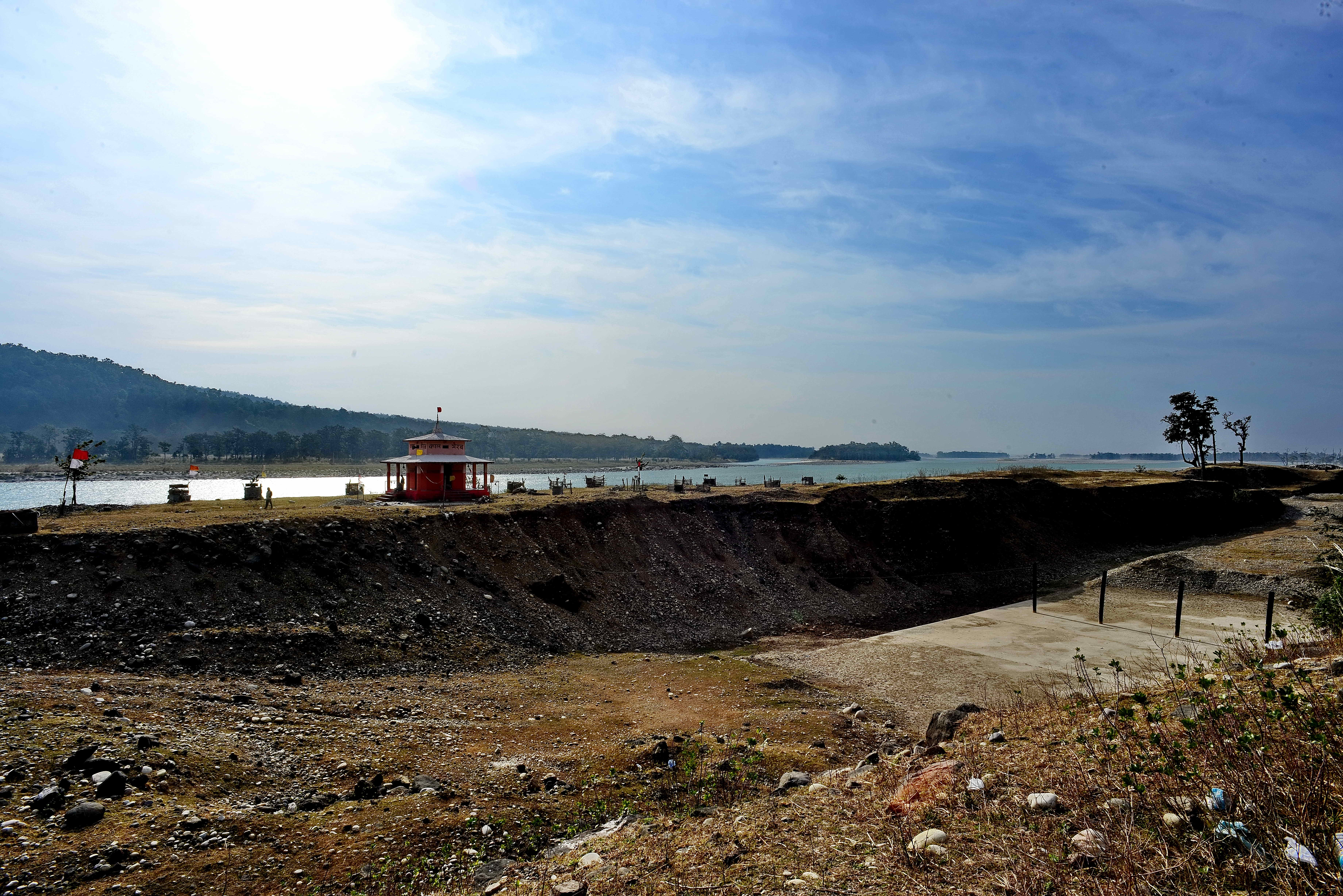

- Location in Nepal Lamki Chuha (Nepal)
- Coordinates: 28.62°N 81.15°E
- Country: Nepal
- Province: Sudurpashchim
- District: Kailali

Government
  - Mayor: Sushila Shahi (NC)
  - Deputy Mayor: Juna Chaudhary (CPN-UML)

Area
  - Total: 225 km^{2} (87 sq mi)
- Elevation: 100 m (330 ft)

Population (2011)
  - Total: 76,007
  - Density: 338/km^{2} (875/sq mi)
- Time zone: UTC+5:45 (NST)
- Post code: 10900
- Area code: 091
- Website: www.lamkichuhamun.gov.np

Lamki Chuha is a municipality in Kailali District in Sudurpashchim Province of Nepal established on 18 May 2014 by merging Baliya and Chuha, two existing village development committees. Later in May, 2014 it was formed by merging all the wards of Pratappur Village development committee. Lamki Chuha lies 72 kilometres (45 mi) east of Dhangadhi and 590 km (370 mi) west of the capital, Kathmandu. It is surrounded by Bardagoriya Rural Municipality and Joshipur Rural Municipality in the west, Bardiya District in the east, Mohanyal Rural Municipality in the north and Janaki Rural Municipality in the south. Its municipal office is located at Lamki Chuha-2, Bhalka, Kailali.

== Demographics ==
At the time of the 2011 Nepal census, Lamki Chuha Municipality had a population of 76,007. Of these, 57.5% spoke Nepali, 28.1% Tharu, 8.9% Achhami, 1.7% Doteli, 1.2% Dailekhi, 0.9% Magar, 0.6% Maithili, 0.3% Hindi, 0.2% Urdu, 0.1% Bajureli, 0.1% Dadeldhuri, 0.1% Jumli and 0.1% other languages as their first language.

In terms of ethnicity/caste, 28.7% were Tharu, 22.9% Hill Brahmin, 22.3% Chhetri, 8.4% Kami, 4.0% Thakuri, 3.3% Magar, 3.2% other Dalit, 2.6% Damai/Dholi, 1.0% Sanyasi/Dasnami, 0.8% Badi, 0.7% Lohar, 0.7% Sarki, 0.4% Musalman, 0.1% Gurung, 0.1% Hajam/Thakur, 0.1% Halwai, 0.1% Limbu, 0.1% Newar, 0.1% Rajbanshi, 0.1% Tamang, 0.1% other Terai and 0.1% others.

In terms of religion, 96.4% were Hindu, 1.7% Christian, 1.0% Buddhist, 0.4% Muslim and 0.5% others.

In terms of literacy, 64.2% could read and write, 2.7% could only read and 32.9% could neither read nor write.

== Services ==
Lamki Chuha is one of the major commercial centers in Kailali District. As a focal point for connecting other major towns and villages in Kailali District, It has the fastest growth rate of infrastructure and public services. The availability of all infrastructure in Lamki Chuha prompted a lot of people from urban and village areas to migrate to the area.

== Industries ==
There are many large scale industries in Nepal. Thakur Baba Breeder And Hatchery Pvt Ltd, Dolfin Modern Feeds, Chuha Sugar Mill, Deuti Gutka Industries are large scale industries here.

Thakur Baba Breeder & Hatchery Pvt ltd is one of the Biggest hatchery in Nepal and the first hatchery of Kailali district . It Have two branches, central Branch at Lamkichuha 04 Baliya and another in Lamkichuha 7 Changabadi. Mahadev Bajgai (Former Mayor of lamkichuha) is The Managing Director of Hatchery.
Dolfin Modern Feeds is the large scale Industry of Lamkichuha. Surya Bahadur Thapa is the Managing Director. Its another branch is opening in Kohalpur
Deuti Gutka Industry is a Gutka Factory. Its Product Megha Shree is renowned in Kailali. Yagya Bahadur Oli is the Managing Director.
Vasuling Sugar Mill was a large scale Sugar Mill but currently It is closed. There are also another largest large-scale industry in Lamki Chuha municipality.

== Transport ==
Lamki Chuha is connected to the Mahendra Highway, which is the longest highway in Nepal. It is a central meeting point of the Lamki Chuha-Tikapur Highwat and the Lamki Chuha-Achham Highway, where transportation includes auto rickshaws, public minibuses and public city buses.

== See also ==
- Baliya
- Karnali Bridge
- Dhangadhi
- Mahadev Bajgai
- 2017 Nepalese local elections
