= Kailari Rural Municipality =

Kailari Rural Municipality कैलारी गाउँपालिका
- Gaunpalika
- Location in Nepal Kailari Rural Municipality (Nepal)
- Coordinates: 28.57°N 80.82°E
- Country: Nepal
- Province: Sudurpashchim Province
- District: Kailali District

Government
  - Chairperson: Laju Ram Chaudhary (NCP)
  - Vice-chairperson: Laxmi Satgauwa (NCP)

Area
  - Total: 233 km^{2} (90 sq mi)

Population (2011)
  - Total: 47,987
  - Rank: 6th (Nepal)
  - Density: 206/km^{2} (533/sq mi)
- Time zone: UTC+5:45 (Nepal Time)
- Website: https://kailarimun.gov.np/

Kailari is a rural Municipality in Kailali District in Sudurpashchim Province of Nepal. It is surrounded by Bajani Municipality In the East, Dhangadhi Sub Metropolitan City in the West, Gauriganga Municipality and Ghodaghodi Municipality in the North and Uttar Pradesh, India in the South.

== Demographics ==
At the time of the 2011 Nepal census, Kailari Rural Municipality had a population of 47,987. Of these, 88.5% spoke Tharu, 5.5% Nepali, 2.8% Doteli, 1.4% Achhami, 1.0% Maithili, 0.2% Bajhangi, 0.2% Bhojpuri, 0.1% Baitadeli, 0.1% Darchuleli, 0.1% Newar, 0.1% Sign language, 0.1% Urdu and 0.1% other languages as their first language.

In terms of ethnicity/caste, 89.3% were Tharu, 3.5% Chhetri, 2.5% Kami, 1.9% Hill Brahmin, 0.5% other Dalit, 0.5% Damai/Dholi, 0.5% Magar, 0.4% Thakuri, 0.2% Sarki, 0.1% Badi, 0.1% Lohar, 0.1% Musalman, 0.1% Newar, 0.1% Rajbanshi and 0.1% others.

In terms of religion, 97.6% were Hindu, 2.2% Christian, 0.1% Buddhist, 0.1% Muslim and 0.1% others.

In terms of literacy, 62.9% could read and write, 2.0% could only read and 35.2% could neither read nor write.

== See also ==
- Kailali District
- Dhangadhi
- Lamki Chuha Municipality
- Sudurpashchim Province
