= Janaki Rural Municipality (Kailali District) =

Janaki Rural Municipality जानकी गाउँपालिका
- Rural Municipality
- Location in Sudurpashchim Province Janaki Rural Municipality (Nepal)
- Coordinates: 28.559795°N 81.107626°E
- Country: Nepal
- Province: Sudurpashchim
- District: Kailali
- No. of wards: 9
- Established: 10 March 2017
- Incorporated (VDC): Janakinagar, Pathraiya, Durgauli, and Munuwa

Government
  - Chairperson: Ganesh Chaudhary (NUP)
  - Vice-chairperson: Lalmati Devi Kathriya (NUP)

Area
  - Total: 107.27 km^{2} (41.42 sq mi)

Population (2011)
  - Total: 48,540
  - Density: 452.5/km^{2} (1,172/sq mi)
- Time zone: UTC+5:45 (Nepal Standard Time)
- Headquarter: Durgauli
- Website: Official Website

Janaki is a rural municipality in Kailali District located in Sudurpashchim Province of Nepal.

The rural municipality was established In 2017 while the Nepalese government restructured 753 new local level units cancelling the old thousands of local level units. The rural municipality was created merging the then four following VDCs: Janakinagar, Pathraiya, Durgauli, and Munuwa. Total area of this rural municipality is 107.27 square kilometres (41.42 sq mi) and it is divided into 9 wards. 48,540 individuals lived here according to the 2011 Nepal census.

== Demographics ==
At the time of the 2011 Nepal census, Janaki Rural Municipality had a population of 48,540. Of these, 60.1% spoke Tharu, 21.6% Nepali, 11.4% Achhami, 3.9% Doteli, 1.0% Dailekhi, 0.6% Urdu, 0.4% Magar, 0.4% Maithili, 0.2% Jumli, 0.1% Awadhi, 0.1% Bajureli, 0.1% Hindi and 0.1% other languages as their first language.

In terms of ethnicity/caste, 60.4% were Tharu, 10.1% Hill Brahmin, 9.8% Chhetri, 8.4% Kami, 3.1% Thakuri, 1.8% Damai/Dholi, 1.7% Magar, 1.3% Lohar, 0.8% Sanyasi/Dasnami, 0.7% Musalman, 0.7% Sarki, 0.3% other Dalit, 0.2% Badi, 0.1% Bengali, 0.1% Gurung, 0.1% Kumal, 0.1% Newar, 0.1% Teli, 0.1% other Terai and 0.2% others.

In terms of religion, 95.3% were Hindu, 2.5% Christian, 1.4% Buddhist, 0.7% Muslim and 0.1% others.

In terms of literacy, 64.7% could read and write, 2.0% could only read and 33.2% could neither read nor write.
