= Ghodaghodi =

Ghodaghodi घोडाघोडी
- Municipality (नगरपालिका)
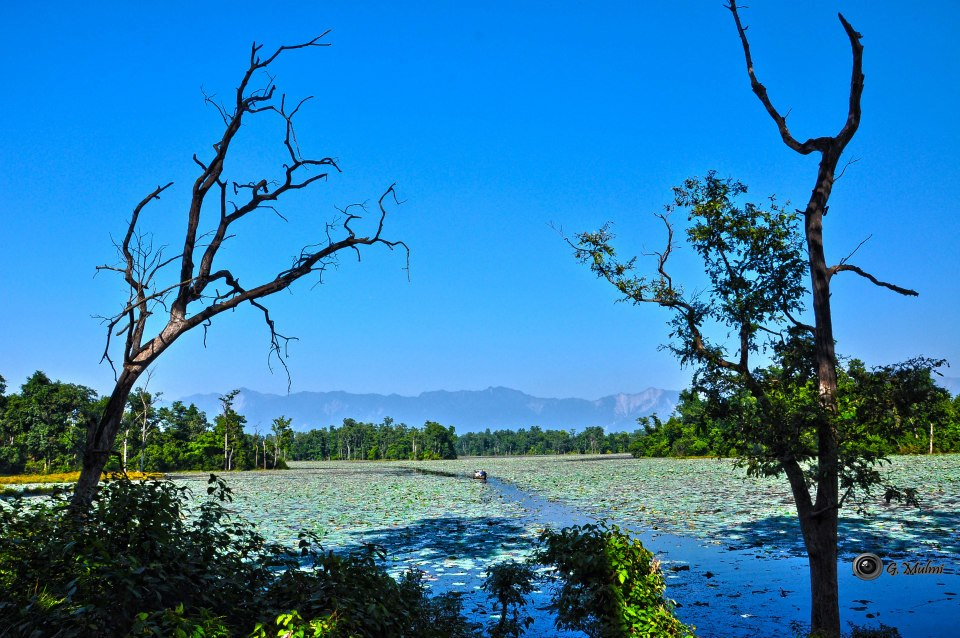
- Ghodaghodi Lake

- Location in Nepal Ghodaghodi (Nepal)
- Coordinates: 28.6277°N 80.9650°E
- Country: Nepal
- Province: Sudurpashchim
- District: Kailali

Government
  - Mayor: Khadak Bahadur Rawat (CPN (US))
  - Deputy Mayor: Guliya Devi Chaudhary (Nepali Congress)

Area
  - Total: 354 km^{2} (137 sq mi)

Population (2011)
  - Total: 75,965
  - Density: 215/km^{2} (556/sq mi)
- Time zone: UTC+5:45 (NST)
- Post code: 10900
- Area code: 091
- Website: ghodaghodimun.gov.np

Ghodaghodi Municipality is a Municipality in Kailali District of Sudurpashchim Province.

Ghodaghodi lies 58 km east of Dhangadhi and 613 km west of the capital, Kathmandu. It is surrounded by Mohanyal in the north, Bhajani Municipality in the south, Bardagoriya Rural Municipality in the east and Gauriganga Municipality in the west. It is divided into 12 wards. It was established by merging Darakh, Sadepani, Ramsikhar Jhala, and Pahalmanpur 4 existing village development committees.

== Demographics ==
At the time of the 2011 Nepal census, Ghodaghodi Municipality had a population of 75,965. Of these, 41.1% spoke Tharu, 35.4% Nepali, 9.5% Doteli, 7.6% Achhami, 1.8% Bajureli, 1.6% Baitadeli, 0.7% Maithili, 0.5% Magar, 0.3% Bajhangi, 0.3% Darchuleli, 0.2% Dailekhi, 0.2% Hindi, 0.2% Kham, 0.1% Urdu and 0.1% other languages as their first language.

In terms of ethnicity/caste, 41.4% were Tharu, 27.1% Chhetri, 11.9% Hill Brahmin, 6.5% Kami, 4.7% Thakuri, 2.2% Magar, 1.6% Damai/Dholi, 0.9% other Dalit, 0.7% Sarki, 0.6% Lohar, 0.6% Sanyasi/Dasnami, 0.5% Badi, 0.3% Gurung, 0.3% Musalman, 0.1% Halwai, 0.1% Meche, 0.1% Newar, 0.1% Tamang, 0.1% other Terai and 0.1% other languages as their first language.

In terms of religion, 96.3% were Hindu, 1.8% Buddhist, 1.5% Christian and 0.3% Muslim.

In terms of literacy, 65.5% could read and write, 2.6% could only read and 31.9% could neither read nor write.

== Election Result ==
2017 Nepalese local elections

Mayoral Election

Party	Candidate	Votes	Status
CPN UML	Mamata Prasad Chaudhary	8164	Elected
CPN Maoist	Laxman Chaudary	7237	Lost
Nepali Congress	Rita Kumari Chaudhary	6210	Lost
Madhesi Jana Adhikar Forum, Nepal	Chandra Kumar Chaudhary	1548	Lost

Deputy Mayor Election

Party	Candidate	Votes	Status
CPN UML	Prem kumari Thapa	7234	Elected
CPN Maoist	Durga Chalaune (Khadga)	7019	Lost
Nepali Congress	Hem Bahadur Bam	5794	Lost
Federal Socialist Forum, Nepal	Sushila Chaudhary	2409	Lost

== See also ==
- Kailali District
- Sudurpashchim Province
