= Joshipur Rural Municipality =

Joshipur Rural Municipality जोशीपुर गाउँपालिका
- Gaunpalika
- Location in Nepal Joshipur Rural Municipality (Nepal)
- Coordinates: 28.5674°N 81.0147°E
- Country: Nepal
- Province: Sudurpashchim Province
- District: Kailali District

Government
  - Chairman: Chitra Bahadur Chaudhary (NUP)
  - Vice-Chairman: Rekha Devi Kathariya (NUP)

Area
  - Total: 65.6 km^{2} (25.3 sq mi)

Population (2011)
  - Total: 36,459
  - Density: 556/km^{2} (1,440/sq mi)
- Time zone: UTC+5:45 (NST)
- Post code: 10900
- Area code: 091
- Website: http://joshipurmun.gov.np

Joshipur is Rural Municipality in Kailali District of Sudurpashchim Province established by merging Bauniya and Joshipur two existing village development committees. Joshipur lies 75 km east of Dhangadhi and 61 3 km west of the capital, Kathmandu. It is surrounded by Lamki Chuha Municipality, Tikapur Municipality and Janaki Rural Municipality in the East, Ghodaghodi Municipality and Bhajani Municipality in the West, Bardagoriya Rural Municipality in the North and Bhajani Municipality in the South.

== Demographics ==
At the time of the 2011 Nepal census, Joshipur Rural Municipality had a population of 36,459. Of these, 79.4% spoke Tharu, 9.8% Doteli, 6.2% Nepali, 2.8% Achhami, 0.6% Maithili, 0.5% Hindi, 0.5% Urdu, 0.1% Newar and 0.1% other languages as their first language.

In terms of ethnicity/caste, 80.2% were Tharu, 8.7% Chhetri, 2.9% Hill Brahmin, 2.4% Kami, 1.5% Damai/Dholi, 1.5% Thakuri, 1.0% Musalman, 0.6% other Dalit, 0.3% Sarki, 0.2% Newar, 0.1% Badi, 0.1% Kayastha, 0.1% Koiri/Kushwaha, 0.1% Magar, 0.1% Sonar, 0.1% Teli and 0.2% others.

In terms of religion, 97.9% were Hindu, 1.0% Christian, 1.0% Muslim and 0.1% Buddhist.

In terms of literacy, 60.3% could read and write, 2.6% could only read and 37.1% could neither read nor write.

== Temples ==
- Ram Janaki Mandir, Jabahi
- Shree Someswarnath Mandir, Badhariya
- Shree Baneshwar baba sibha Mandir Dham, Bani

== See also ==
- Sudurpashchim Province
- Kailali District
- Lamki Chuha Municipality
