= Bardagoriya Rural Municipality =

Bardagoriya Rural Municipality बर्गगोरिया
- Location in Nepal Bardagoriya Rural Municipality (Nepal)
- Coordinates: 28.65°N 81.04°E
- Country: Nepal
- Province: Sudurpashchim Province
- District: Kailali District

Government
  - Chairman: Karna Bahadur Kunwar (CPN UML)
  - Vice-Chairman: Ganesh Raj Giri ( Nepal Communist Party (Maoist)

Area
  - Total: 77.3 km^{2} (29.8 sq mi)

Population (2011)
  - Total: 32,683
  - Density: 423/km^{2} (1,100/sq mi)
- Time zone: UTC+5:45 (NST)
- Post code: 10900
- Area code: 091
- Website: http://bardgoriyamun.gov.np

Bardagoriya is a rural municipality in Kailali District of Nepal. Bardagoriya Rural Municipality lies 65 km east of Dhangadhi and 605 km west of the capital, Kathmandu. It is surrounded by Ghodaghodi Municipality to the west, Lamki Chuha Municipality to the east, Joshipur Rural Municipality to the south and Mohanyal to the north. Bauniya Bazar is its largest market.

== Demographics ==
At the time of the 2011 Nepal census, Bardagoriya Rural Municipality had a population of 32,683. Of these, 41.7% spoke Tharu, 31.9% Nepali, 12.2% Doteli, 7.2% Achhami, 3.5% Maithili, 1.4% Magar, 0.8% Jumli, 0.4% Hindi, 0.1% Bajureli, 0.1% Dailekhi, 0.1% Kham, 0.1% Urdu and 0.1% other languages as their first language.

In terms of ethnicity/caste, 41.8% were Tharu, 17.6% Chhetri, 13.9% Kami, 11.6% Hill Brahmin, 5.1% Thakuri, 3.3% Damai/Dholi, 2.1% Magar, 1.1% Sarki, 1.0% other Dalit, 0.8% Lohar, 0.4% Sanyasi/Dasnami, 0.3% Badi, 0.3% Musalman, 0.1% Terai Brahmin, 0.1% Gurung, 0.1% Newar, 0.1% Tatma/Tatwa, 0.1% other Terai, 0.1% Yadav and 0.2% others.

In terms of religion, 92.3% were Hindu, 6.1% Buddhist, 1.2% Christian, 0.3% Muslim and 0.1% others.

In terms of literacy, 60.1% could read and write, 3.2% could only read and 36.7% could neither read nor write.

== Public Services ==
Bardagoriya Rural Municipality is connected to the Mahendra Highway, which is the longest highway of Nepal, where transport includes auto rickshaws, public minibuses and public city buses. Karnali River Yatayat and Sudurpachim Yatayat provides regular bus services provides regular service in Kailali District.

Bardagoriya Rural Municipality has many private and government schools and high schools like basant murari and sunrise.

== Land Seizure ==
On July 31, 2019, 43 bigha and 17 kathha (roughly 297,000 m^{2}) of land was seized by the revolutionary Communist Party of Nepal under the name of Tharuwan Autonomous Province Bardagoriya People’s Council Nepal.

== See also ==
- Lamki Chuha Municipality
- Sudurpashchim Province
- Dhangadhi
- Kathmandu
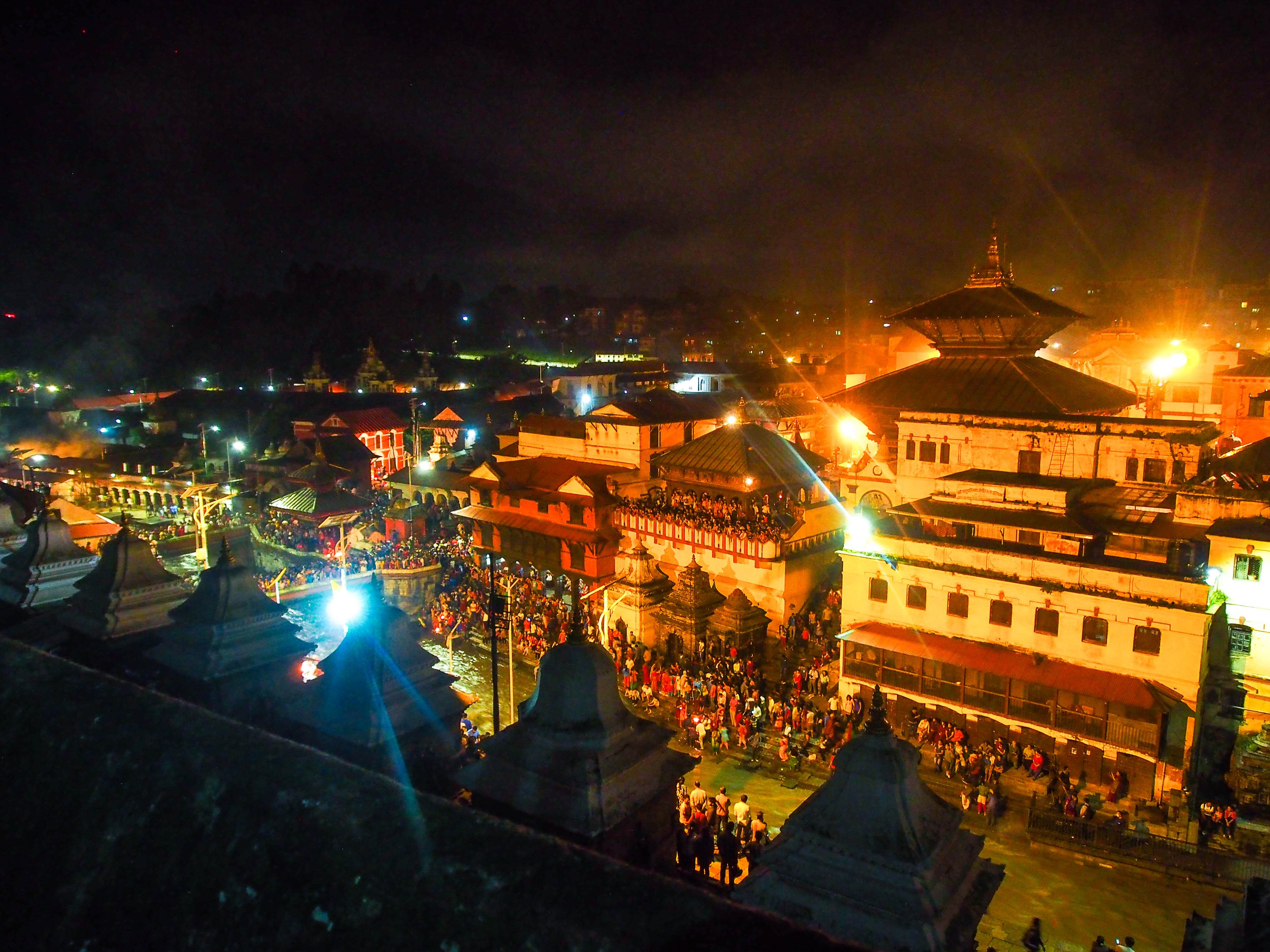
  Night scenery of Kathmandu
- Michael Jordan
