= Khem Raj Koirala =

Nepalese politician

Honourable Khem Raj Koirala
- खेमराज कोइराला

Member of Parliament, Pratinidhi Sabha
- Incumbent
- Assumed office 26 March 2026
- Preceded by: Bir Bahadur Balayar
- Constituency: Kailali 4

Personal details
- Born: 26 March 1977 (age 49) Gauriganga, Kailali
- Citizenship: Nepalese
- Party: Rastriya Swatantra Party (2026 – present)
- Parent: Mahananda Koirala (father)
- Profession: Politician

Khem Raj Koirala (Nepali: खेमराज कोइराला) is a Nepalese politician of Rastriya Swatantra Party, currently serving as a member of parliament. He was elected to the Pratinidhi Sabha, the lower house of the Federal Parliament of Nepal from the Kailali 4 parliamentary constituency in the 2026 Nepalese General Election. He secured 28,556 votes and defeated Gorakh Bahadur Bista of the Nepali Congress.

== Personal and academic life ==
Koirala was born in Gauriganga, Kailali, on March 26, 1977. He was born to Mahananda Koirala. He passed the SLC from Panchami Secondary School in first division. He was admitted to Kailali Multiple Campus for higher education and completed a Bachelor's degree in English and economics. Later, he pursued a Master's degree in rural development from Mahendra Multiple Campus, Nepalgunj.

== Politics ==
He began his political journey by joining the Rastriya Swatantra Party in 2026 to contest in the 2026 Nepalese general election from the Kailali 4 constituency.

== Electoral performance ==
Election	Year	Constituency	Contested for	Political party	Result	Votes	% of votes	Ref.
Nepal general election	2026	Kailali 4	Pratinidhi Sabha member	Rastriya Swatantra Party	Won	28,556	42.44%	
