= Chauha =

Chuha चुहा
- Location in Nepal
- Coordinates: 28.69°N 81.12°E
- Country: Nepal
- Province: Sudurpashchim Province
- District: Kailali District

Population (1991)
  - Total: 10,145
- Time zone: UTC+5:45 (Nepal Time)

Chuha is a town in Lamki Chuha Municipality in Kailali District in Sudurpashchim Province of western Nepal. The formerly Village development committee was merged along with Baliya VDC to form the new municipality on 18 May 2014. At the time of the 1991 Nepal census it had a population of 10,145 living in 1,497 individual households.
