= Ganga Ram Chaudhary =

Nepalese politician

- गंगाराम चौधरी

Member of Parliament, Pratinidhi Sabha
- In office 22 September 2022 – 12 September 2025
- Preceded by: Gauri Shankar Chaudhary
- Succeeded by: Jagat Prasad Joshi
- Constituency: Kailali 3

Personal details
- Born: August 13, 1978 (age 47) Kailali District, Nepal
- Party: Nagrik Unmukti Party, Nepal

Ganga Ram Chaudhary (Nepali: गंगाराम चौधरी) is a Nepalese politician and member of the Nagrik Unmukti Party, Nepal. He was elected in 2022 from Kailali 3 to the House of Representatives.

== See also ==
- Nagrik Unmukti Party, Nepal
