= Gauriganga =

Gauriganga Municipality गौरीगंगाा नगरपालिका गौरीगंगाा नगरपालिका
- Municipality
- Location in Nepal Gauriganga Municipality (Nepal)
- Coordinates: 28.77°N 80.76°E
- Country: Nepal
- Province: Sudurpashchim
- District: Kailali
- Municipality: Gauriganga Municipality
- Ward: 11

Government
  - Mayor: Devi Dutta Kandel (Maoist Centre)
  - Deputy Mayor: Bhoj Bahadur Bam(Nepali Congress)

Area
  - Total: 244.44 km^{2} (94.38 sq mi)

Population (2021)
  - Total: 64,327
  - Density: 263.16/km^{2} (681.58/sq mi)

Languages
  - Official language: Nepali
  - Local language: Khas (Bajhangi, Achhami, Doteli, Bajureli), Tharu, Khas Nepali, etc
- Time zone: UTC+5:45 (NST)
- Post code: 10900
- Area code: 091
- Website: www.gaurigangamun.gov.np

Gauriganga Municipality is a municipality in Kailali District in the Sudurpashchim Province. At the time of the 2011 Nepal census it had a population of 55,314 living in 5,293 individual households. It is Surrounded by Ghodaghodi Municipality in the west, Godawari Municipality in the east, Mohanyal and Chure Rural Municipality in the north and Dhangadhi Sub Metropolitan City and Kailari Rural Municipality in the south.

== Demographics ==
At the time of the 2011 Nepal census, Gauriganga Municipality had a population of 58,286. Of these, 32.8% spoke Doteli, 30.0% Tharu, 20.2% Nepali, 10.3% Achhami, 1.6% Bajhangi, 1.4% Magar, 1.2% Bajureli, 0.5% Kham, 0.5% Raji, 0.3% Baitadeli, 0.3% Maithili, 0.2% Darchuleli, 0.2% Hindi, 0.2% Tamang, 0.1% Gurung and 0.2% other languages as their first language.

In terms of ethnicity/caste, 30.3% were Tharu, 27.2% Chhetri, 12.7% Kami, 11.8% Hill Brahmin, 4.5% Magar, 4.3% Thakuri, 3.4% Damai/Dholi, 1.4% Sarki, 0.9% Lohar, 0.7% Sanyasi/Dasnami, 0.6% Badi, 0.6% Raji, 0.3% Newar, 0.2% Gurung, 0.2% Hajjam/Thakur, 0.2% Tamang, 0.1% Bengali, 0.1% other Dalit, 0.1% Halwai, 0.1% Kumal, 0.1% Musalman, 0.1% other Terai and 0.1% others.

In terms of religion, 94.2% were Hindu, 1.5% Buddhist, 1.0% Christian, 0.1% Muslim and 3.1% others.

In terms of literacy, 62.6% could read and write, 3.6% could only read and 33.8% could neither read nor write.
