= Bir Man Chaudhari =

Nepali politician

Honourable Bir Man Chaudhari
- बीरमान चौधरी

Member of Provincial Assembly of Sudurpashchim Province
- Incumbent
- Assumed office 2017
- Constituency: Kailali 3(A)

Member of Constituent Assembly of Nepal
- In office 2008–2013
- Constituency: Kailali-3

Personal details
- Party: Communist Party of Nepal (Maoist)

Bir Man Chaudhari (Nepali: बीरमान चौधरी) is a Nepalese politician, belonging to the Communist Party of Nepal (Maoist) and current Member of Sudurpaschim Provincial Assembly. In the 2008 Constituent Assembly election he was elected from the Kailali-3 constituency, winning 19739 votes. He was defeated by Jagat Prasad Joshi of Rastriya Swatantra Party in the parliamentary 2026 general election.

== Electorate History ==
He was elected to the Member of Provincial Assembly of Sudurpashchim Province from Kailali 3(A).He contested and won Member of Constituent Assembly of Nepal from Kailali 3.

2017 Nepalese provincial elections

Kailali 3(A)

| Party | Candidate | Votes | Status |
|---|---|---|---|
| CPN (Maoist Centre) | Bir Man Chaudhari | 15873 | Elected |
| Nepali Congress | Puran Prasad Chaudhary | 12261 | Lost |

2008 Nepalese Constituent Assembly election

Kailali 3

| Party | Candidate | Votes | Status |
|---|---|---|---|
| CPN (Maoist Centre) | Bir Man Chaudhari | 19,739 | Elected |
| Rastriya Prajatantra Party | Mohan Raj Malla | 6,126 | Lost |

== See also ==
- Provincial Assembly of Sudurpashchim Province
- Kailali 3 (constituency)
