= Beladevipur =

Beladevipur बलदेवीपुर
- Location in Nepal
- Coordinates: 28.76°N 80.63°E
- Country: Nepal
- Province: Sudurpashchim Province
- District: Kailali District

Population (1991)
  - Total: 5,006
- Time zone: UTC+5:45 (Nepal Time)

Beladevipur is a town in Attariya Municipality in Kailali District in Sudurpashchim Province of western Nepal. The formerly Malakheti, Shreepur, Beladevipur, Geta Village Development Committees were merged to form the new municipality since 18 May 2014. At the time of the 1991 Nepal census it had a population of 5006 living in 621 individual households.
