= DTY =

DTY or dty may refer to:

- Doteli language (or Dotyali), spoken in Nepal (ISO 639-3:dty)
- DTY, in polyester processing
