= Mahadev Bajgai =

Nepali politician

Mayor Mahadev Bajgai
- महादेव बजगाई
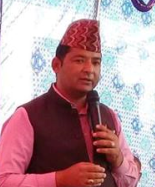

Mayor of Lamki Chuha Municipality
- In office 5 July 2017 – 24 April 2022
- Deputy: Tika Thapa
- Preceded by: Position established
- Succeeded by: Sushila Shahi

Personal details
- Born: 23 February 1978 (age 48) Kamalbazar Municipality, Achham District
- Citizenship: Nepali
- Party: Communist Party of Nepal (Unified Marxist–Leninist)
- Spouse: Indra Bajgain
- Children: 3
- Parent(s): Mani Ram Bajgain (father); Durpata Devi Bajgain (mother)

Mahadev Bajgain (Nepali: महादेव बजगाई) is a Nepalese politician and a former mayor of Lamki Chuha Municipality in Kailali District. He is a member of the secretariat of the CPN-UML Sudurpaschim Province Committee.

During his tenure as mayor, Bajgain led several development projects in Lamki Chuha Municipality, including the construction of a hospital in Ward No. 10. Funds originally allocated for the purchase of official vehicles (NPR 7.5 million) were redirected to the hospital project following a decision at the third municipal council meeting.

Bajgain is also involved in business activities in western Nepal and serves as the chairman of Thakur Baba Business Group, which operates a large poultry hatchery in the region. He owns businesses in other sectors as well.

== Personal life ==
Mahadev Bajgain was born on 23 February 1978 in a Brahmin family. He is the second son of Maniram Bajgain and Durpata devi Bajgain. He started his political life in Kailali District.

== Electoral history ==
He was elected to the Mayor of Lamki Chuha Municipality in the 2017 Nepalese local elections. He lost the 2022 Nepalese local elections for the post of Mayor of Lamki Chuha Municipality.

=== Nepalese local elections, 2017 ===
He has been elected to the Mayor of Lamkichuha Municipality in the 2017 Nepalese local elections defeating Bhakta Bahadur Thapa, Nepali Congress candidate by the margin of 667 votes.

Mayor of Lamkichuha
Party	Candidate	Votes	Status
CPN-UML	Mahadev Bajgain	7188	Elected
Nepali Congress	Bhakta Bahadur Thapa	6521	Lost
Madheshi Jana Adhikar Forum, Nepal (Loktantrik)	Arun Kumar Chaudhary	6222	Lost
CPN (Maoist Centre)	Dal Bahadur Bista	4701	Lost

=== 2022 Nepalese local elections ===
In the 2022 Nepalese local elections, Mahadev Bajgain, the CPN-UML’s official candidate for mayor, lost the election to Sushila Shahi, who was the candidate of an alliance of five political parties: the Nepali Congress, CPN (Maoist Centre), CPN (Unified Socialist), People's Socialist Party, Nepal, and Rastriya Janamorcha. Some reports stated that Bajgain was considered a strong candidate, but he was defeated by the combined opposition of the alliance of five political parties. Following the election, CPN-UML Kailali District Committee Chairman Ratan Bahadur Thapa was removed from his position for allegedly playing a role in the defeat of the party’s official candidate, Bajgain.

Mayor of Lamkichuha
Party	Candidate	Votes	Status
Nepali Congress	Sushila Shahi	12713	Elected
CPN-UML	Mahadev Bajgain	11935	Lost
Nepal Loktantrik Party	Deshram Chaudhary	1580	Lost
Nagrik Unmukti Party	Mahendra upadhyay	1072	Lost

== See also ==
- Lamkichuha Municipality
- Communist Party of Nepal (Unified Marxist–Leninist)
