= Basauti =

Basauti बसौटी
- Village development committee
- Location in Nepal
- Coordinates: 28.62°N 80.81°E
- Country: Nepal
- Province: Sudurpashchim Province
- District: Kailali District

Population (1991)
  - Total: 4,590
- Time zone: UTC+5:45 (Nepal Time)

Basauti is a village development committee in Kailali District in Sudurpashchim Province of western Nepal. At the time of the 1991 Nepal census it had a population of 4590 living in 544 individual households.
