= Sainik Awasiya Mahavidyalaya Teghari Kailali =

Sainik Awasiya Mahavidhyalaya
- Teghari, Kailali; Nepal

Information
- Type: Public
- Motto: Gyanena Paramo Sewa (Imparting Knowledge is the Biggest Service)
- Established: 2068
- School district: Kailali
- Principal: Siddheshwar Pant (Prakash) (working)
- Grades: 6 to 12
- Colours: Green, red, blue, yellow
- Athletics: Soccer, cricket, volleyball, tennis, gymnastics, Taekwondo
- Magazine: "Godawari"

Sainik Awasiya Mahavidyalaya Teghari Kailali (SAMT) is a school run under the Nepalese Army Welfare Fund. It is located in the Kailali district of Western Nepal. The present principal is Siddheshwar Pant (Prakash). The present liaison officer is Major Prebesh Dahal . It is the far western development region of Nepal. The school was established on 10 Chaitra 2068 BS by Commander in Chief Chhatraman Singh Gurung.

== Ordinary ==
The Nepalese Army has established at least one military school in every state, with the principal objective of providing education to the children of the gross status of the army, Godawari Municipality of Kaliali district under the Sudurpashchim Province. Sainik Awasiya Mahavidyalaya, Teghari was established in the year 2067 BS.
