= Janakinagar =

Janakinagar may refer to:

- Janakinagar, Sagarmatha, Nepal
- Janakinagar, Sarlahi, Nepal
- Janakinagar, Seti, Nepal
