= Malakheti =

Malakheti मालाखेती
- Location in Nepal
- Coordinates: 28.84°N 80.56°E
- Country: Nepal
- Zone: Seti Zone
- District: Kailali District

Population (1991)
  - Total: 8,938
- Time zone: UTC+5:45 (Nepal Time)

Malakheti is a town in Attariya Municipality in Kailali District in the Seti Zone of western Nepal. The formerly Malakheti, Shreepur, Beladevipur, Geta Village Development Committees were merged to form the new municipality since 18 May 2014. At the time of the 1991 Nepal census it had a population of 8938 living in 1523 individual households.
