= Hum Paanch =

Hum Paanch (lit. 'We Five' in Hindi) may refer to:

- Hum Paanch (film), a 1980 Indian Hindi film
- Hum Paanch (TV series), a 1995-2006 Indian sitcom
