= Jagat Prasad Joshi =

Nepalese politician

- जगतप्रसाद जोशी

Member of Parliament, Pratinidhi Sabha
- Incumbent
- Assumed office 26 March 2026
- Preceded by: Ganga Ram Chaudhary
- Constituency: Kailali 3

Personal details
- Citizenship: Nepalese
- Party: Rastriya Swatantra Party
- Education: Sociology
- Alma mater: Tribhuvan University (MA)
- Profession: Politician

Jagat Prasad Joshi (Nepali: जगतप्रसाद जोशी) is a Nepalese politician serving as a member of parliament from the Rastriya Swatantra Party. He is the member of the 7th Pratinidhi Sabha elected from Kailali 3 constituency in 2026 Nepalese General Election securing 20,359 votes and defeating his closest contender Birman Chaudhary of the Nepali Communist Party. He holds MA in Sociology from Tribhuvan University.

In the parliamentary session held on 8 April 2026, Joshi urges government to provide identification documents and rehabilitation to over 1500 freed Kamaiya and Kamalari families of Kailali, Kanchanpur.

== Electoral Performance ==
Election	Year	Constituency	Contested for	Political party	Result	Votes	% of votes	Ref.
Nepal general election	2026	Kailali 3	Pratinidhi Sabha member	Rastriya Swatantra Party	Won	20,359	36.07%	
