= Hasuliya =

Hasuliya हसौलिया
- Village development committee
- Location in Nepal
- Coordinates: 28.58°N 80.83°E
- Country: Nepal
- Province: Sudurpashchim Province
- District: Kailali District

Population (1991)
  - Total: 10,638
- Time zone: UTC+5:45 (Nepal Time)

Hasuliya is a village development committee in Kailali District in Sudurpashchim Province, western Nepal. At the time of the 1991 Nepal census it had a population of 10,638 living in 1405 individual households.
