= Hum Paanch (TV series) =

Television series

- Written by: Imtiaz Patel
- Directed by: Kapil Kapoor; Rajat Rawail; Sameer Kulkarni; Raju Parsekar; Rajan Waghdhare
- Opening theme: "Hum Paanch"
- Composers: Shreerang Aras; Lalit Sen
- Country of origin: India
- Original language: Hindi
- No. of seasons: 3
- No. of episodes: 345

Production
- Producers: Ekta Kapoor; Shobha Kapoor
- Editors: Ajay Bhave; Vikas Sharma; Ranie Singh
- Running time: Approximately 30 minutes

Original release
- Network: Zee TV
- Release: 1 March 1995 – 2006

Hum Paanch (transl. The Five of Us) is an Indian sitcom that first aired from 1995 to 1999. The series returned for a second season in 2005 and 2006. The show starred Ashok Saraf, Vidya Balan, Rakhee Tandon, Bhairavi Raichura, and Vandana Pathak.

== Plot ==
Anand Mathur is in a white-collar job who always finds himself in trouble because of his five daughters — Meenakshi, Radhika, Sweety, Kajal, and Chhoti. The three elder daughters are by his first wife. The younger two are by his second wife Bina, whom he married upon becoming a widower.

Together, the five girls plan to do something new in every episode. Anand's first wife speaks to him through her portrait on the living room wall; Bina generally supports the daughters' ideas. The show was a runaway success, helping to establish Zee TV.

When the show returned for a second season, Anand had returned from a long stay in the United States. Meenakshi was married to Purush whom she treats like a servant and shouts at. Radhika is married to Daljeet Singh whom her sisters call 'Pape'. He is a scientist and invents many things which get the girls into trouble. He is forgetful — he forgets people's names and basic things. Meenakshi's daughter is Damini, and Radhika's daughter is Gudiya.

== Characters ==
- Anand Mathur attended Kallubhai Lallubhai Koylawala Municipal School in his childhood and later on received his B.A. with excellent scores (first class). He works as a sales representative in a medicine factory. Anand Mathur married his second wife, Bina Mathur, on 17 January.
- Bina Mathur is from a village called Baliya. Her complete name is Binadevi Anandkumar Janardhan Prasad Mathur. When Anand Mathur went to Bina's house for her hand in marriage, his three elder daughters were with him. According to Bina, she married Anand because the three daughters hurt her ego and she wanted to exact revenge on them. Upon seeing her for the first time, Meenakshi compared Bina to a loudspeaker who would create sound pollution in their lives. Radhika saw Bina as an actress Mala Sinha portraying an illiterate woman in a movie. Sweety said that Bina would lose the title of Miss Uttar Pradesh, even if Bina was the only contestant. After marrying Anand, Bina fell in love with her stepdaughters and forgot her woes. Later, Bina reveals to her daughters that her first love was Abhi who left her to go work in a diamond mine in Africa which is another reason she married Anand.
- Anand Mathur's first wife would communicate with him through her portrait. She took great effort to make her husband's life difficult, despite being a spirit herself. However, she always helped him establish peace and gave him the best advice.
- Meenakshi, the eldest daughter, is a feminist and often dream big of bringing a change in the society. Her husband Purush is a gharjamai.
- Radhika is intelligent, nerdy and geeky. She uses a hearing aid and has a habit of bumping into doors, walls, statues, people, etc. due to her poor vision.
- Sweety is beauty without brains, whose sole purpose in life is to marry Shahrukh Khan and become an actress or a model. She feels that it is only her duty to open the house door whenever the doorbell rings. Sweety has a disciple, Babli, who adores and worships her. Babli is Anand Mathur's boss, Popatlal's daughter. Sweety authored the novel Goddess of Big Things with the help of Babli.
- Kajal is a tomboy who dresses up as a boy and gets into fistfights with thugs and goons.
- Chhoti, the youngest, is a gossip-monger. She is hailed as an incarnation of actress Meena Kumari by the people of Baliya and has a temple dedicated to her.
- Pooja aunty is a nosy neighbour who responds with, "Aunty mat kaho na" (transl. Don't call me aunty) on being referred to as 'aunty'.

== Cast ==
=== Season one ===
- Ashok Saraf as Anand Mathur
- Priya Tendulkar as Anand's first wife
- Shoma Anand as Bina Mathur
- Vandana Pathak as Meenakshi Mathur
  - Kavita Rathod as Meenakshi Mathur: Rathod replaced Pathak
  - Ritu Deepak as Meenakshi Mathur: Deepak replaced Kavita Rathod
  - Neelam Sagar as Meenakshi Mathur: Sagar replaced Ritu Deepak
- Amita Nangia as Radhika Mathur
  - Vidya Balan as Radhika Mathur: Balan replaced Amita Nangia
  - Sujata Sanghamitra as Radhika Mathur: Sanghamitra replaced Vidya Balan
- Rakhi Vijan as Sweety Mathur
- Bhairavi Raichura as Kajal Mathur aka Kajal Bhai
- Priyanka Mehra as Chhoti
  - Aishwarya Duggal as Chhoti: Duggal replaced Priyanka Mehra
  - Anna Khan as Chotti: Khan replaced Aishwarya Duggal
- Aruna Sangal as Pooja
- Sharad Sharma as Kadar Bhai
- Jatin Kanakia as Sunil
- Suchitra Bandekar as Babli
- Rajendra Nath / Jeetendra Bharadwaj as Popatlal, Aanand's boss

=== Season Two ===
- Ashok Saraf as Anand Mathur
- Sudha Chandran as Ramola Anand's first wife
- Shoma Anand as Bina Mathur
- Vandana Pathak as Meenakshi Mathur (Gaura Suryanshi)
- Pamela Mukherjee as Radhika Mathur
- Rakhi Vijan as Sweety Tina Mathur Twins
- Bhairavi Raichura as Kajal Mathur aka Ragini Bhai
- Pushtiie Shakti as Chhoti
- Suchitra Bandekar as Babli
- Aruna Sangal as Pooja
- Sharad Sharma as Kadar Bhai
- Javed Pathan as Khaliya
- Ali Asghar as Purush, Meenakshi's husband
- Dheeraj Sarna as Daljeet Singh, Radhika's husband
- Naman Shaw as Aditya Adit Samoosa

== Production ==
=== Development ===
The series was Balaji Telefilms' first, back when its office was in a garage. The show thus marked the debut of Ekta Kapoor as a producer, at the age of 16. She personally made sure that the actors did their rehearsals and improvisations. The script of the first season was written by Imtiaz Patel. According to Ashok Saraf, who played the lead role of Anand Mathur in the series, "He has written the characters so well, people got hooked with each of them. Imtiaz's work was the height of improvisation. Imtiaz Patel was so talented that he could write one episode on a single line that he read in a newspaper." The show was mainly shot in Mumbai, with huge crowds assembling whenever there were scenes shot on the streets.

=== Casting ===
The series was the debut for many of the actors, including Vandana Pathak, Vidya Balan, and Rakhi Vijan. The show was the first comedy role of Shoma Anand.

== Release ==
It was aired on Zee TV every Tuesdays 8pm, leading to its success as a series loved by the whole family. The first season ran from 1995 to 1999, while the second from 2005 to 2006.

== Reboot ==
A reboot, Hum Paanch Phir Se, aired on Big Magic from 19 June 2017 to 1 March 2018 with a new cast and produced by Essel Vision Productions.

The cast includes:

- Sooraj Thapar as Anand Mathur
- Seema Pandey as Bina Mathur
- Vaishnavi Mahant as Priya
- Jayashree Venketaramanan as Kajal
- Ambalika Sapra as Radhika
- Sylvia Chadha as Sweety
- Ruchi Tripathi as Meeenakshi
- Rimmi Srivastava as Chhoti
