= Dododhara =

Dododhara दोदोधारा
- Village development committee
- Location in Nepal
- Coordinates: 28.69°N 81.05°E
- Country: Nepal
- Province: Sudurpashchim Province
- District: Kailali District

Population (1991)
  - Total: 8,299
- Time zone: UTC+5:45 (Nepal Time)

Dododhara is a village development committee in Kailali District in Sudurpashchim Province of western Nepal. At the time of the 1991 Nepal census it had a population of 8299 living in 1296 individual households.
