= Munuwa =

Munuwa मुनुवा
- Village development committee
- Location in Nepal
- Coordinates: 28.54°N 81.08°E
- Country: Nepal
- Zone: Seti Zone
- District: Kailali District

Population (1991)
  - Total: 9,276
- Time zone: UTC+5:45 (Nepal Time)

Munuwa is a village development committee in Kailali District in the Seti Zone of western Nepal. At the time of the 1991 Nepal census it had a population of 9276 living in 1173 individual households.
