= Ramsikhar Jhala =

Ramshikhar Jhala रामशिखर झला
- Village development committee
- Location in Nepal
- Coordinates: 28.75°N 80.94°E
- Country: Nepal
- Zone: Seti Zone
- District: Kailali District

Population (1991)
  - Total: 7,503
- Time zone: UTC+5:45 (Nepal Time)

Ramsikhar Jhala is a village development committee in Kailali District in the Seti Zone of western Nepal. At the time of the 1991 Nepal census it had a population of 7503 living in 1008 individual households.
