= Sripur, Kailali =

Coordinates: 28°48′N 80°35′E

Sripur श्रीपुर
- Village Development Committee
- Interactive map of Sripur
- Country: Nepal
- Zone: Seti Zone
- District: Kailali District

Population (1991)
  - Total: 8,430
- Time zone: UTC+5:45 (Nepal Time)

Sripur is a Village Development Committee in Kailali District in the Seti Zone of western Nepal. The formerly Malakheti, Sripur, Beladevipur, Geta Village Development Committees were merged to form the new municipality since 18 May 2014. At the time of the 1991 Nepal census it had a population of 8430 residing in 1180 individual households.
