= Godawari Khola =

Rivers in Nepal

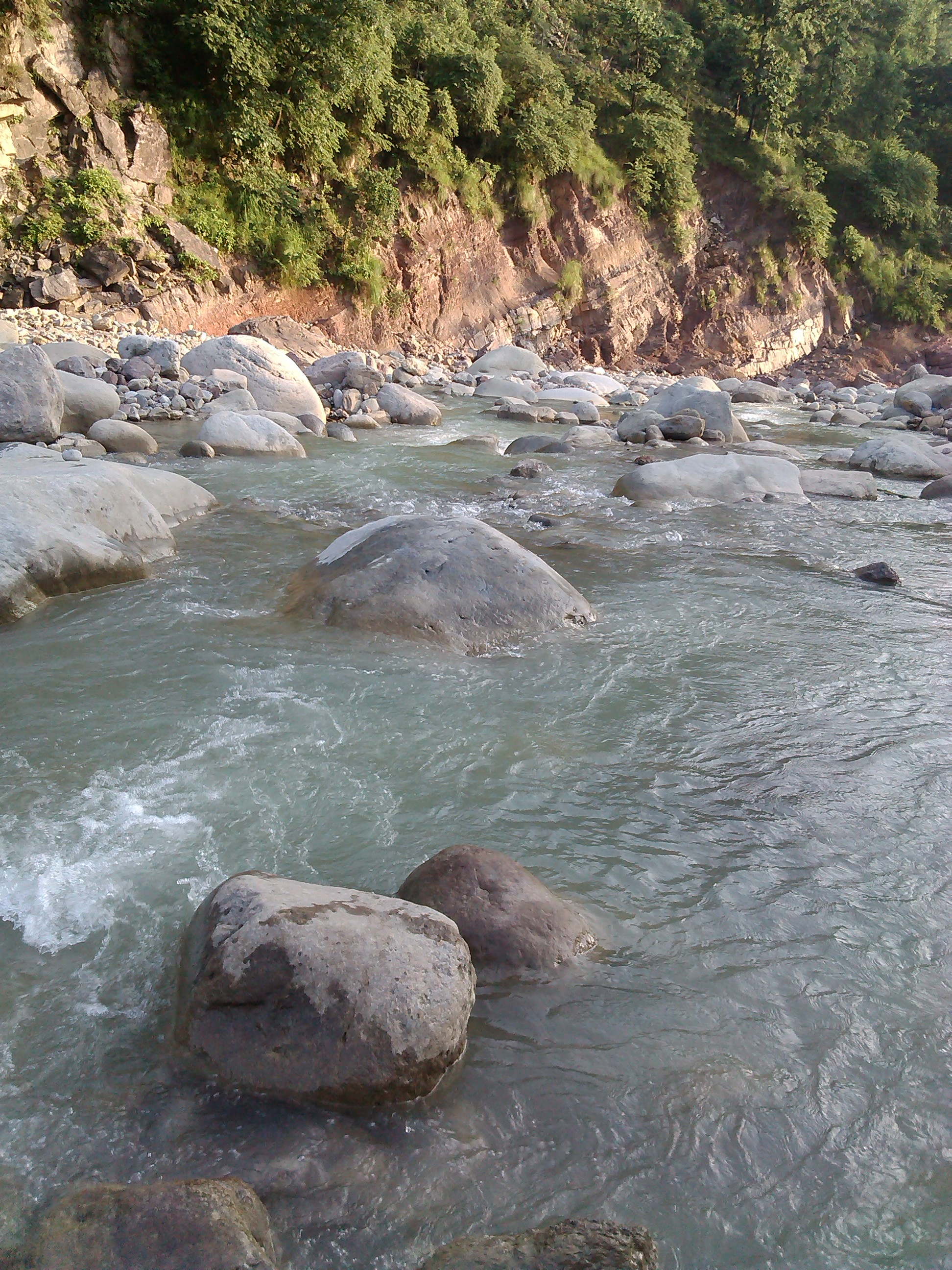
- Godawari River in Kailali district
- Native name: गोदावरी खोला (Nepali)

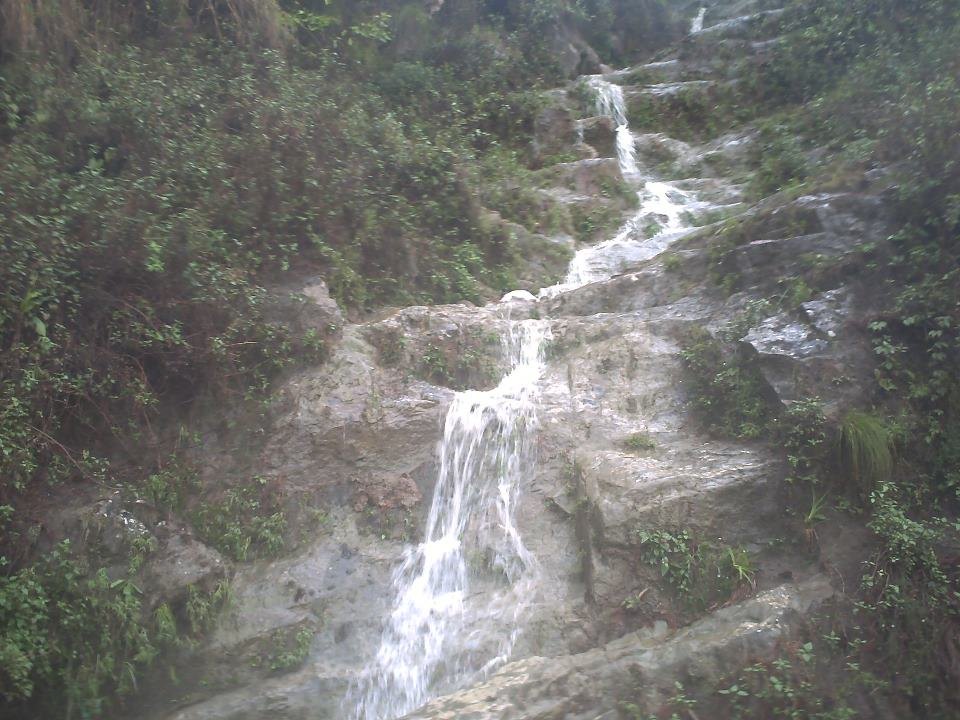
Godawari in Province No. 3

Godawari River (Nepali: गोदावरी खोला) are two different rivers (tributaries), located in two different regions of Nepal.

== Godawari Khola (Bagmati) ==
Godawari Khola is a tributary of Bagmati River of Nepal. It is a sacred river for Hindus. Every twelve years, Pushkaram fair is held on its banks of the river. Godawari, Lalitpur (municipality) is named after this river. total area of naudhara= 0.011km^2

== Godawari Khola (Sudurpashchim) ==
Godawari River in Sudurpashchim is also a tributary of Ghaghra River. It is also understood a sacred river of Nepal. Godawari, Sudurpashchim (Capital of Sudurpashchim Province) was named after this river. Godawari Makar Mela (fair) held on the river of Godawari in Godawari Municipality.
