= Ghodaghodi Tal =

Protected area in Nepal

- Nepali: घोडाघोडी ताल
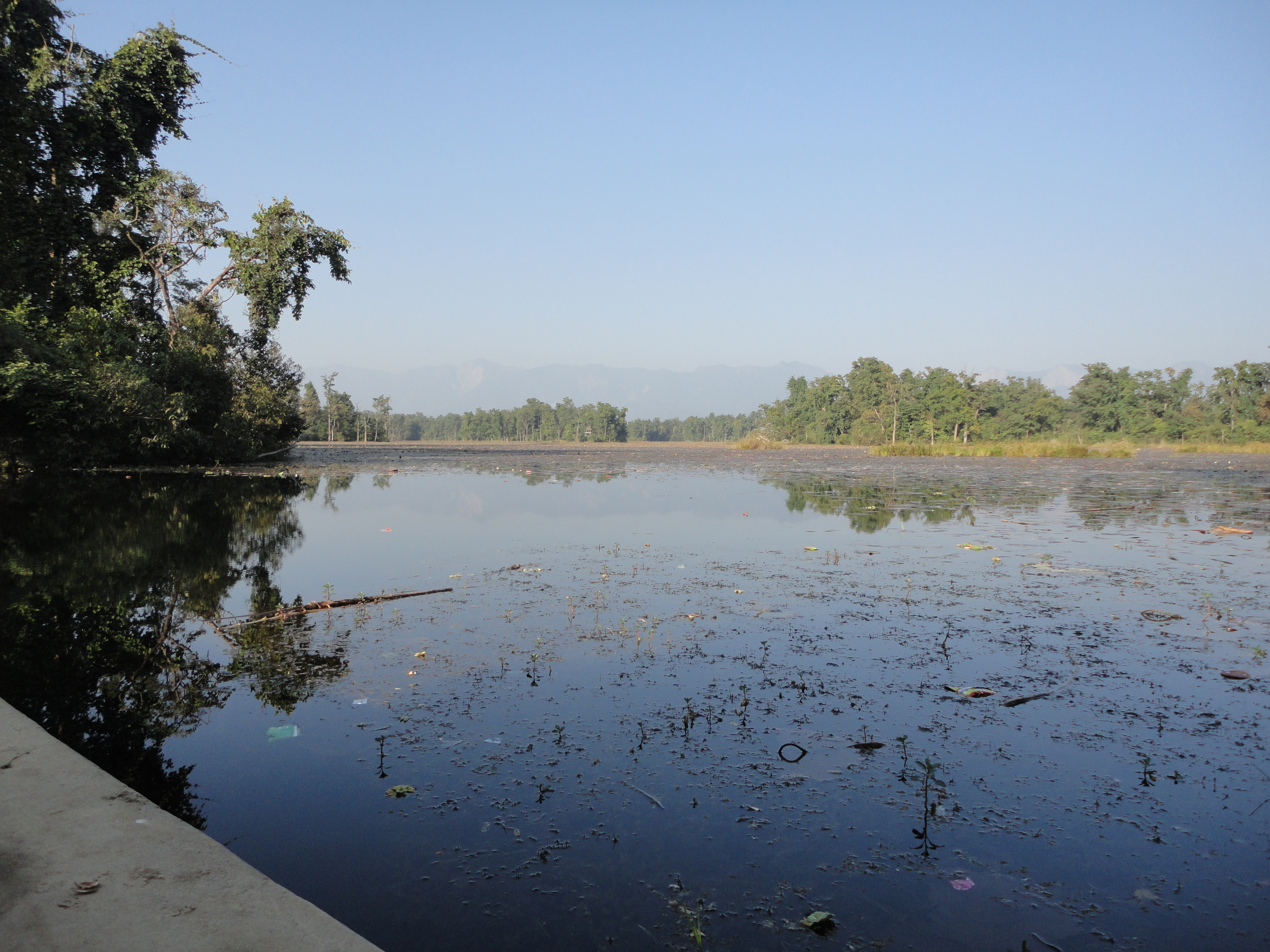

- Location within Sudurpashchim Province Location within Nepal Location within South Asia
- Location: Kailali, Nepal
- Coordinates: 28°41′00″N 80°56′45″E
- Type: fresh water lake
- Basin countries: Nepal
- Max. length: 1.83 km (1.14 mi)
- Surface area: 2,563 ha (6,330 acres)
- Average depth: 4 m (13 ft)
- Surface elevation: 205 m (673 ft)

Ramsar Wetland
- Official name: Ghodaghodi Lake Area
- Designated: 13 August 2003
- Reference no.: 1314

Ghodaghodi Tal is a Ramsar site in western Nepal. It was established in August 2003 it covers an area of 2,563 h (9,230 ks) in Kailali District at an elevation of 205 m (673 ft) in the Siwalik Hills. It was declared as a bird sanctuary in March 2022.

== Flora ==
The lake has record of 388 vascular plants: five ptredophytes, 253 dicots, and 130 monocots.

== Fauna ==
Animals living here include the Eurasian otter, Bengal tiger, and red-crowned roofed turtle.

During a survey in February 2021, 26 mugger crocodiles were recorded in 18 lakes.
