= Sadepani =

Sadepani सडेपानी
- Village development committee
- Location in Nepal
- Coordinates: 28.70°N 81.00°E
- Country: Nepal
- Zone: Seti Zone
- District: Kailali District

Population (1991)
  - Total: 10,729
- Time zone: UTC+5:45 (Nepal Time)

Sadepani is a village development committee in Kailali District in the Seti Zone of western Nepal. At the time of the 1991 Nepal census it had a population of 10729 living in 1537 individual households.
