= Bhajani =

Bhajani Municipality भजनी नगरपालिका
- Municipality
- Location in Nepal Bhajani Municipality (Nepal)
- Coordinates: 28.4957°N 80.9816°E
- Country: Nepal
- Province: Sudurpashchim
- District: Kailali
- Established: March 10, 2017

Government
  - Mayor: Kewal Chaudhary (NUP)
  - Deputy Mayor: Raju Tiruwa (NUP)

Area
  - Total: 176 km^{2} (68 sq mi)

Population (2011)
  - Total: 52,128
  - Density: 296/km^{2} (767/sq mi)
- Time zone: UTC+5:45 (NST)
- Post code: 10900
- Area code: 091
- Website: www.bhajanitrishaktimun.gov.np

Bhajani is a Municipality in Kailali District in the Sudurpashchim Province of Nepal. At the time of the 2011 Nepal census it had a population of 52,128. It is surrounded by Tikapur Municipality and Joshipur Rural Municipality in the East, Kailari Rural Municipality in the West, Ghodaghodi Municipality in the North and Tikunia, Uttar Pradesh in the South. It is divided into 9 wards.

== Demographics ==
At the time of the 2011 Nepal census, Bhajani Municipality had a population of 52,128. Of these, 65.7% spoke Tharu, 15.4% Nepali, 5.4% Doteli, 3.9% Achhami, 3.3% Hindi, 2.6% Raji, 1.2% Maithili, 0.8% Urdu, 0.3% Bajureli, 0.2% Bote, 0.2% Jumli, 0.2% Magar, 0.1% Baitadeli, 0.1% Bhojpuri, 0.1% Dailekhi, 0.1% Punjabi, 0.1% Tamang and 0.1% other languages as their first language.

In terms of ethnicity/caste, 65.9% were Tharu, 11.3% Chhetri, 5.8% Kami, 3.7% Hill Brahmin, 2.6% Raji, 2.3% other Terai, 1.5% Musalman, 1.3% Thakuri, 1.2% other Dalit, 1.2% Magar, 0.6% Damai/Dholi, 0.5% Yadav, 0.3% Chamar/Harijan/Ram, 0.3% Lohar, 0.2% Bote, 0.2% Sarki, 0.2% Tamang, 0.1% Badi, 0.1% Dhobi, 0.1% Dusadh/Paswan/Pasi, 0.1% Kalwar, 0.1% Kayastha, 0.1% Lodh, 0.1% Marwadi, 0.1% Newar, 0.1% Punjabi/Sikh, 0.1% Sanyasi/Dasnami, and 0.1% others.

In terms of religion, 96.5% were Hindu, 1.8% Christian, 1.4% Muslim, 0.2% Buddhist and 0.1% others.

In terms of literacy, 60.2% could read and write, 3.3% could only read and 36.4% could neither read nor write.

== Election Result ==
2017 Nepalese local elections

Mayoral Election

Party	Candidate	Votes	Status
CPN Maoist	Sher Bahadur Chaudhary	5228	Elected
Madhesi Jana Adhikar Forum, Nepal	Kewal Chaudhary	5025	Lost
Nepali Congress	Bir Bahadur Hamal	3153	Lost
CPN-UML	Pradip Malla	2104	Lost

Deputy Mayor Election

Party	Candidate	Votes	Status
CPN Maoist	Chaya Devi Devkota	5008	Elected
Madhesi Jana Adhikar Forum, Nepal	Dhanwasi Dangauray	4378	Lost
Nepali Congress	Bharti Kumari Chaudhary	2934	Lost
CPN-UML	Madhu Mati Devi Chaudhary	2144	Lost

== See also ==
- Kailali District
- Tikapur
- Sudurpashchim Province
