= Durgauli =

Durgauli दुर्गौली
- Village development committee
- Location in Nepal
- Coordinates: 28.56°N 81.14°E
- Country: Nepal
- Province: Sudurpashchim Province
- District: Kailali District

Population (1991)
  - Total: 9,822
- Time zone: UTC+5:45 (Nepal Time)

Durgauli is a village development committee in Kailali District in Sudurpashchim Province of western Nepal. At the time of the 1991 Nepal census it had a population of 9822 living in 1309 individual households.
