= Sharad Sharma =

Indian cartoonist

Sharad Sharma is an Indian cartoonist based in New Delhi, India. He was associated with many newspapers and magazines before he switched to electronic media and introduced political animation to Indian TV news channels. In the late 1990s, he formed the organisation World Comics India to introduce the idea of grassroots comics. The idea was to take this new communication medium to the masses. He took the art of cartooning and comics to the rural hinterland of India and other South Asian countries. He has extensive experience from workshops with a variety of organisations in India and internationally. His cartoon strip Developmentoon has been published in several newspapers and websites internationally. He has also published several books and manuals.

Since 2006 he has been helping small organisations working in remote areas to initiate social campaigns using grassroots comics on issues like infanticide, foeticide, corporal punishment and paedophilia.

== Awards ==
He received the Karmaveer Puraskaar Noble Laureates, 2009 in the "Social Communication and Campaign Strategist" sub-category.

He received the Real Heroes Award by CNN IBN & Reliance Industries, 2008.

He was awarded Ashoka-Innovators for Public, Fellowship, 2005
