= Chure Rural Municipality =

Chure Rural Municipality चुरे गाँउपालिका
- Gaunpalika
- Location in Nepal Chure Rural Municipality (Nepal)
- Coordinates: 28.94°N 80.58°E
- Country: Nepal
- Province: Sudurpashchim Province
- District: Kailali District

Government
  - Chairman: Dhan Bahadur Rokka Magar(NCP)
  - Vice Chairman: Deepa Devi Saud (NCP)

Area
  - Total: 493 km^{2} (190 sq mi)

Population (2011)
  - Total: 19,157
  - Density: 38.9/km^{2} (101/sq mi)
- Time zone: UTC+5:45 (NST)
- Post code: 10900
- Area code: 091

Chure Rural Municipality (Nepali: चुरे गाउँपालिका) is a Gaunpalika in Kailali District in Sudurpashchim Province of Nepal. On 12 March 2017, the government of Nepal implemented a new local administrative structure in which Village Development Committees have been replaced with Municipal and Village Councils. Chure is one of these 753 local units.

== Demographics ==
At the time of the 2011 Nepal census, Chure Rural Municipality had a population of 19,157. Of these, 47.5% spoke Nepali, 44.9% Doteli, 5.3% Magar, 1.1% Achhami, 0.5% Kham, 0.4% Tamang, 0.1% Hindi, 0.1% Maithili, 0.1% Sherpa and 0.2% other languages as their first language.

In terms of ethnicity/caste, 41.4% were Chhetri, 25.9% Magar, 9.0% Hill Brahmin, 8.5% Kami, 6.9% Thakuri, 2.8% Sarki, 1.9% Damai/Dholi, 1.4% Tamang, 0.6% Gurung, 0.4% other Dalit, 0.4% Lohar, 0.3% Sanyasi/Dasnami, 0.1% Badi, 0.1% Rai, 0.1% Sherpa and 0.3% others.

In terms of religion, 86.7% were Hindu, 11.7% Buddhist, 1.3% Christian and 0.3% others.

In terms of literacy, 59.3% could read and write, 4.5% could only read and 36.1% could neither read nor write.
