= Godawari, Kailali =

Godawari गोदावरी
- Municipality
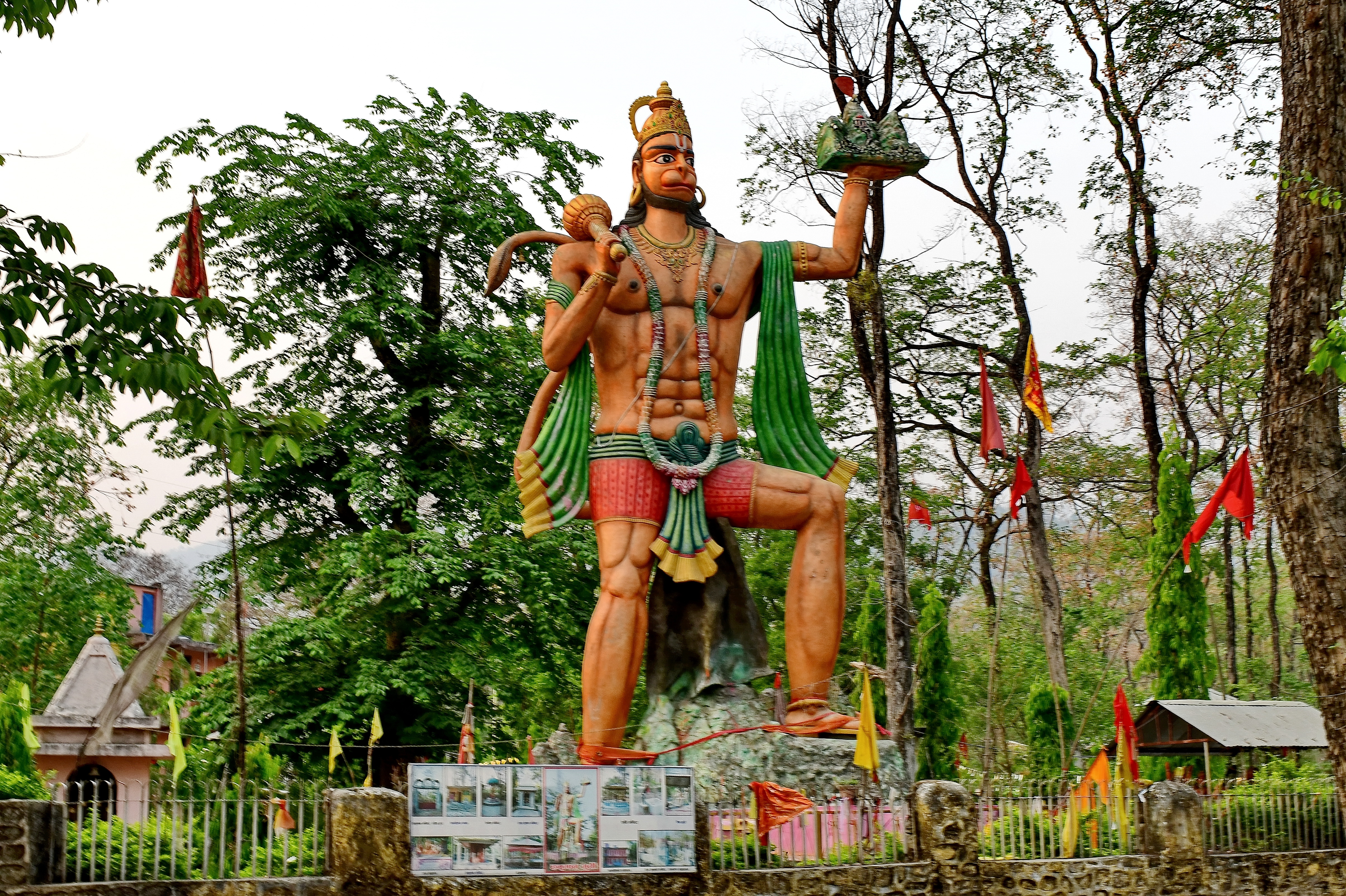
- Nepal's Tallest Hanuman Statue of 52 feet at Godawari

- Location within Sudurpashchim Province Location within Nepal
- Coordinates: 28°54′36″N 80°35′24″E
- Country: Nepal
- Province: Sudurpaschim
- District: Kailali
- No. of wards: 12
- Established: 18 May 2014
- Incorporated (VDC): Attariya, Malakheti, Sripur, Geta and Godawari
- Admin HQ.: Attariya Bazar

Government
  - Type: Mayor–council
  - Body: Godawari Municipality
  - Mayor: Mr. Birendra Bhatta (NC)
  - Deputy Mayor: Mrs. Sharada Devi Rokaya (CPN (UML))
  - MP & Constituency: Kailali 4 Bir Bahadur Balayar (NC)
  - MLA & Constituency: Kailali 4(B); Prakash Bam (NC)

Area
  - Total: 308.63 km^{2} (119.16 sq mi)

Population (2021)
  - Total: 98,746
- Time zone: UTC+05:45 (NPT)
- Website: godawarimunkailali.gov.np

Godawari Municipality (Nepali: गोदावरी नगरपालिका, कैलाली) formerly known as Attariya Municipality is a municipality located in the Kailali District of Nepal.

The municipality was established on 18 May 2014 under the name Attariya Municipality by merging the former village development committees of Attariya, Malakheti, Sripur and Geta. The total area of the Godawari municipality is 308.63 square kilometres (119.16 mi^{2}). At the time of the 2011 Nepal census, it had a population of 78,018 people living in 14,915 individual households.

== History ==
Godawari in actual, is believed to be a holy place holding religious importance since early long time. This is a famous pilgrimage spot in far-west. The spot has been situated on the side of holy Godawari river, which is the great faith the point of Hindu people. It is believed that in ancient times one of major rishis of Hindus, Gautama has gone into deep penance and received self-knowledge in this region and in Duaper millennium also Lord Krishna grandfather Bhishma along with five Pandavas with Draupadi during their Forest exile devotion had stayed in this place, had bath in this river and gained knowledge of purity heart and mind. In the memory of these great sages there is held a big religious fair on 1stmagh of every year which is known as Godawari Makar Mela.

Fulfilling the requirement of the new Constitution of Nepal, 2015, all old municipalities and villages (which were more than 3900 in number) were restructured into 753 new units, thus this municipality upgraded into Godawari Municipality

In 2017, the Godawari village development committee was merged into Attariya and the city's name was changed to Godawari Municipality.

In 2018, Godawari was declared the capital of Sudurpaschim Province. But till now Dhangadhi serves as the temporary capital for the Sudurpashchim Province.

== Demographics ==
At the time of the 2011 Nepal census, Godawari Municipality had a population of 79,686. Of these, 59.6% spoke Doteli, 20.4% Tharu, 11.3% Nepali, 4.7% Achhami, 0.8% Bajureli, 0.8% Magar, 0.6% Baitadeli, 0.4% Hindi, 0.3% Bajhangi, 0.3% Kham, 0.3% Gurung, 0.2% Maithili, 0.1% Bhojpuri, 0.1% Gurung, 0.1% Tamang and 0.1% other languages as their first language.

In terms of ethnicity/caste, 31.9% were Chhetri, 20.6% Tharu, 16.6% Kami, 14.7% Hill Brahmin, 4.8% Damai/Dholi, 3.0% Magar, 2.5% Thakuri, 1.6% Sarki, 0.8% Badi, 0.6% Lohar, 0.5% Newar, 0.5% Sanyasi/Dasnami, 0.4% Tamang, 0.2% other Dalit, 0.2% Musalman, 0.1% Halwai, 0.1% Rai, 0.1% other Terai, 0.1% Yakkha and 0.2% others.

In terms of religion, 97.7% were Hindu, 1.5% Christian, 0.6% Buddhist and 0.2% Muslim.

In terms of literacy, 66.0% could read and write, 3.7% could only read and 30.3% could neither read nor write.

== Industry ==
BRICK :: Saanvi Brick Industries, located in Attariya, is the first full automatic brick factory in the Far-Western Region of Nepal. It mainly produce the international standard i.e. quality based brick. It uses in government building, personal home, temple etc. It is locate at Dhangadhi road near Attariya Chowk.

ROSIN :: Divya Rosin Turpentine limited mainly produce the Rosin & Turpentine a chemical based industry.

== Tourism ==
Godawari River: The Godawari River is a sacred place for Hindus and near it can be found multiple Hindu temples, including those to Shiva Mandir and Hanuman Mandir; as well as a Buddhist Gompa.

Baddi Machheli (बड्डी मछेली ), or simply Machheli: The name Machheli means abundant fish. A hanging bridge crosses the Machheli river and there is a nearby picnic spot.

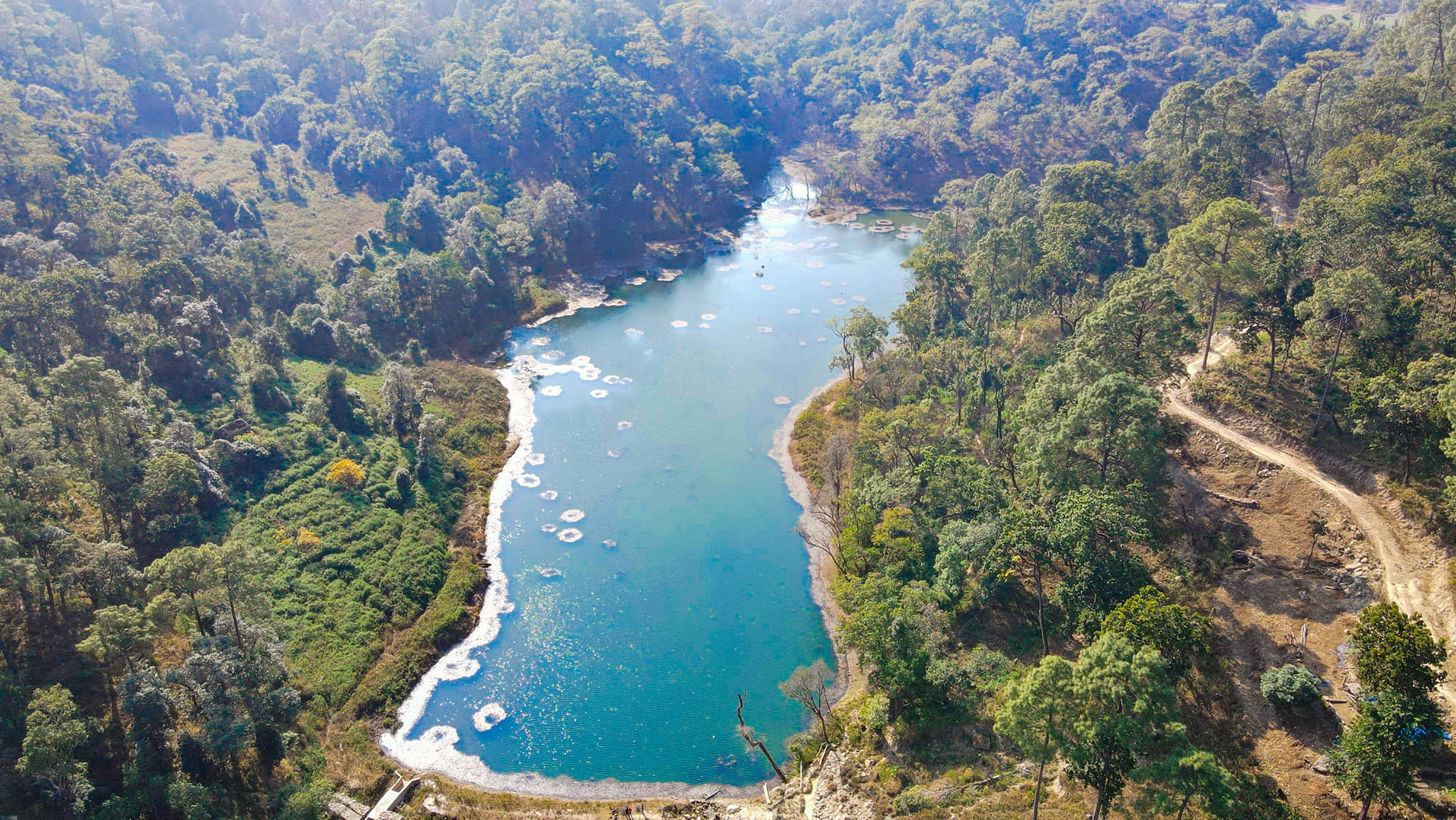
Nayal Lake

Nayal Lake is situated in Godawari Municipality ward Number 12, Chapsalli which is hidden beauty of Godawari.

== Transportation ==
Godawari serves as a gateway to Far-Western Nepal and a transport hub due to its location at the intersection of the Mahendra and Mahakali highways.

== Education ==
The development of a significant number of schools and colleges in Godawari led far western Nepal to become an educational hub. Durga Laxmi Multiple Camus offers various courses on Arts, Commerce and education up to Post Graduate level. It offers a course of computer engineering for class 9 & 10. Saraswati International Model High School is renowned for its quality school-level education. Recently, The school was awarded by British Council for its educational excellence. Geta Eye hospital offers a diploma in ophthalmology. The proposed Dasharatha Chanda Institute of Medical Sciences which is in ward no.12 is under construction and will offer many courses in Medical sciences in future.

== Health ==
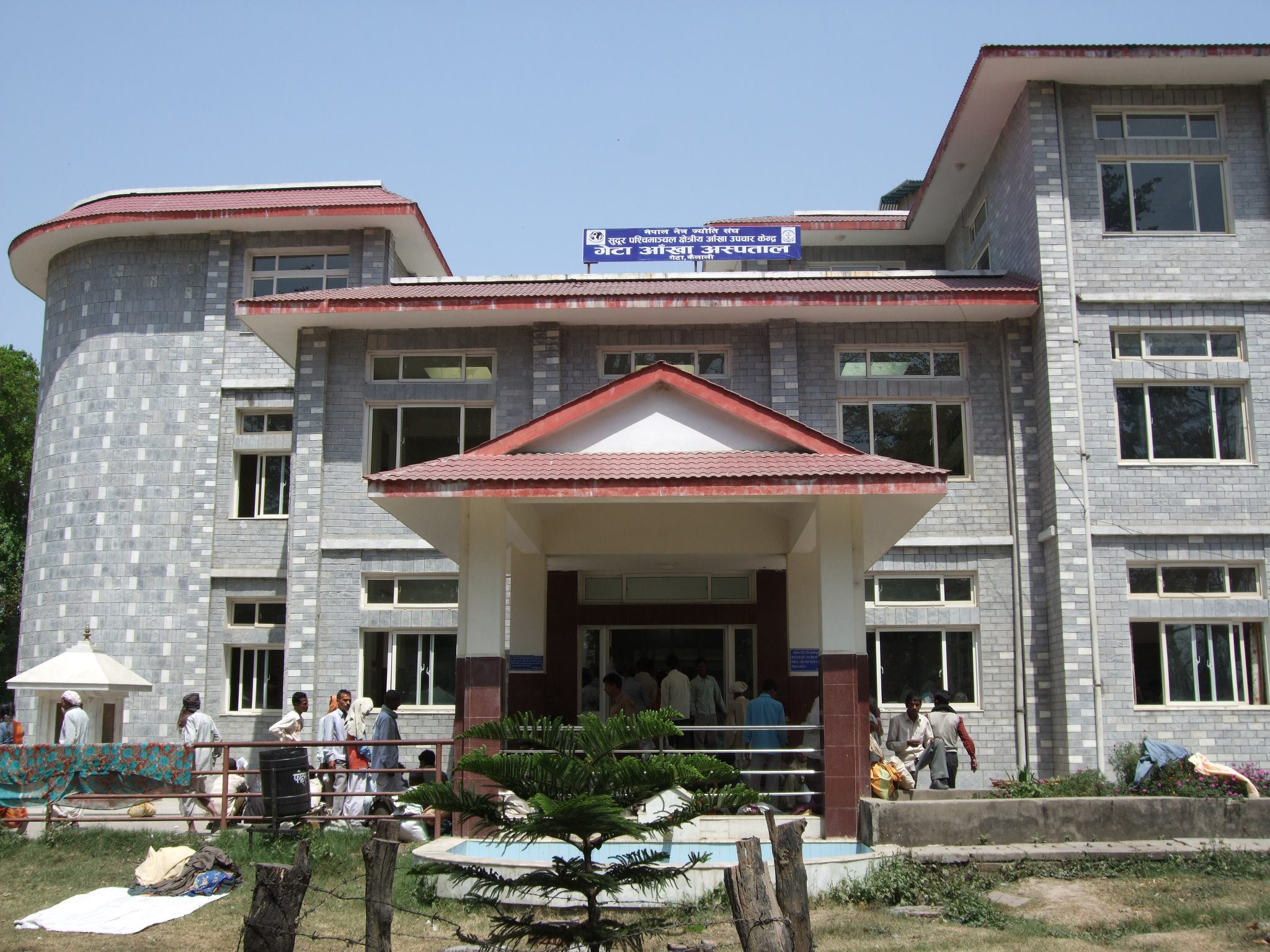
Geta Eye Hospital

Padma Hospital Pvt. Ltd, Sewa Nursing Home provides health services based on Attraiya. Geta Eye Hospital is one of the largest eye hospitals in the country. Geta Eye Hospital is a service-oriented, social organization that provides preventative and curative eye care services in the Far Western Region of Nepal. This hospital provides medical and surgical eye care services with community-based outreach activities such as Surgical eye camps and screening camps in all nine districts of the Seti and Mahakali Zones. The hospital also provides eye care services to a large number of patients visiting from Uttar Pradesh and Uttarakhand of Northern India. The number of patients is increasing every year due to continuous improvement in surgical techniques and relatively low service costs of the medical and surgical treatments. These costs are easily affordable for the middle class as well as poor patients.

== Media ==
To promote local culture, Attariya has Godawari FM 87.9 MHz.
