= Bir Bahadur Balayar =

Nepalese politician

Honourable Bir Bahadur Balayar
- विर बहादुर बलायर

Member of Parliament, Pratinidhi Sabha
- Incumbent
- Assumed office 22 December 2022
- Constituency: Kailali 4

Personal details
- Born: 20 August 1965 (age 60)
- Party: Nepali Congress
- Spouse: Sharmila Balayar
- Parent: Bam Bahadur Balayar (father)

Bir Bahadur Balayar is a Nepalese politician, belonging to the Nepali Congress currently serving as a member of the 2nd Federal Parliament of Nepal. In the 2022 Nepalese general election, he won the election from Kailali 4 (constituency).
