= Gauri Shankar Chaudhary =

Nepali politician

Honourable Gauri Shankar Chaudhary गौरी शंकर चौधरी

Minister of Labour, Employment and Social Security
- In office 25 December 2020 – 20 May 2021
- President: Bidhya Devi Bhandari
- Prime Minister: KP Sharma Oli
- Preceded by: Haribol Gajurel
- Succeeded by: Ram Krishna Yadav

Minister of Agriculture and Livestock Development
- In office 4 August 2016 – 31 May 2017
- President: Bidya Devi Bhandari
- Prime Minister: Pushpa Kamal Dahal

Personal details
- Party: Nepal Communist Party

Gauri Shankar Chaudhary is a Nepalese Politician, former agriculture minister and Minister of Labour, Employment and Social Security and the Member Of House Of Representatives (Nepal) elected from Kailali-3, Province No. 7. He is member of the Communist Party of Nepal (Unified Marxist–Leninist).

== See also ==
- 2021 split in Communist Party of Nepal (Maoist Centre)
