= Baliya =

Ballia
- City development committee
- Location in Ballia
- Coordinates: 28.64°N 81.19°E
- Country: Nepal
- County: Kailali District

Population (1991)
  - Total: 17,512
- Time zone: UTC+5:45 (Nepal Time)

Baliya is a village in Kailali District in the Seti Zone of western Nepal. At the time of the 1991 Nepal census it had a population of 17512 living in 3294 individual households.

Formerly, Baliya was a village development committee (VDC), which were local-level administrative units. In 2017, the government of Nepal restructured local government in line with the 2015 constitution and VDCs were discontinued.
