= Mohanyal Rural Municipality =

Mohanyal मोहनयाल
- Gaunpalika
- Location in Nepal Mohanyal (Nepal)
- Coordinates: 28.88°N 80.89°E
- Country: Nepal
- Province: Sudurpashchim Province
- District: Kailali District

Government
  - Chairperson: Nawalsingh Rawal (NCP)
  - Vice-chairperson: Puja Buda (CPN (US))

Population (1991)
  - Total: 3,917
- Time zone: UTC+5:45 (Nepal Time)
- Website: https://mohanyalmun.gov.np/

Mohanyal is a former village development committee that is now a rural municipality in Kailali District in Sudurpashchim Province of western Nepal. At the time of the 1991 Nepal census it had a population of 3917 living in 614 individual households.

== Demographics ==
At the time of the 2021 Nepal census, Mohanyal Rural Municipality had a population of 21,082. Population consists of 10,280 males (48.8%) and 10,802 females (51.2%). Of these, 74.5% spoke Nepali, 14.8% Magar, 4.8% Achhami, 1.9% Doteli, 1.6% Kham, 1.1% Dailekhi, 0.5% Raji, 0.3% Jumli, 0.2% Maithili, 0.1% Tharu and 0.1% other languages as their first language.

In terms of ethnicity/caste, 28.8% were Magar, 24.9% Chhetri, 16.7% Kami, 12.9% Hill Brahmin, 4.6% Thakuri, 4.1% Damai/Dholi, 2.5% Sarki, 1.3% Sanyasi/Dasnami, 1.2% other Dalit, 0.6% Raji, 0.5% Tharu, 0.4% Badi, 0.4% Newar, 0.3% Lohar, 0.2% Gurung, 0.2% Majhi, 0.1% Dom, 0.1% Kumal, 0.1% Tamang, 0.1% Teli and 0.2% others.

In terms of religion, 80.0% were Hindu, 17.3% Buddhist, 1.3% Christian, 0.9% Prakriti and 0.4% others.

In terms of literacy, 76.56% could read and write, and 23.44% could neither write or read.
