= Jumli language =

Indo-Aryan language of Eastern Pahari branch spoken in Nepal

Jumli Khas
- जुम्ली खस
- The word "Jumli Khas" written in Jumli-Devanagari script
- Native to: Nepal
- Region: Himalayas: Karnali Province
- Native speakers: 40,000
- Language family: Indo-European: Indo-Iranian; Indo-Aryan; Northern; Eastern Pahari; Jumli Khas
- Dialects: Asi Darali; Tribikoti; Rasakoti; Muhu
- Writing system: Devanagari (Jumli alphabet)

Official status
- Official language in: Nepal: Karnali Province (additional official)

Language codes
- ISO 639-3: jml
- Glottolog: juml1238
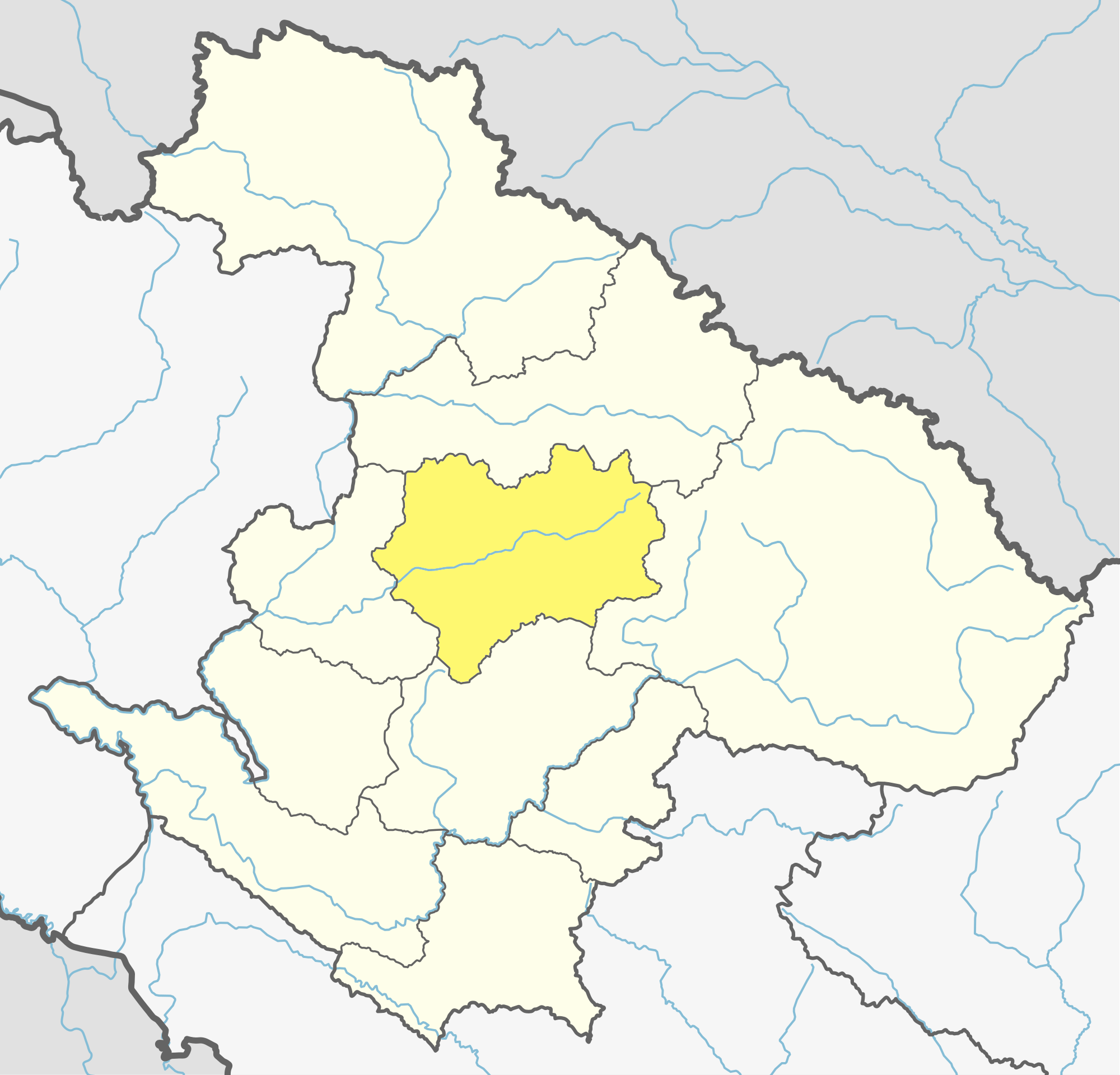
- Jumli speaking areas

Jumli or Jumli Khas (Jumli-Devanagari: जुम्ली खस) is an Indo-Aryan language of Nepal closely related to Nepali. It is primarily spoken in Jumla district and surrounding districts in the Karnali Province of Nepal. The language is occasionally referred to as a dialect of Nepali; however, the Government of Nepal considers Jumli as a different language. The numbers of native speakers estimated 40,000. The Khas language is known as the parent language of Nepali language.

== Dialects ==
- Asi Darali, spoken in 80 Dara, 500 Dara and Sinja Dara of Jumla district.
- Tribikoti, spoken in 1420 Dara of Jumla district and Dolpa District.
- Rasakoti, spoken in Kalikot District.
- Muhu, spoken in Mugu District and Humla District.

== Script ==
Jumli Khas language uses the Devanagari script.

== History ==
Khas language is considered to be the parent language of Nepali. The language is considered to developed in Sinja Valley of Karnali province.

== Phonology ==
On 17 August 2017, a draft regarding 'Jumli Khas language writing style' was proposed. The draft proposed 29 consonants and 6 vowels for writing the language. According to Ramanand Acharya, a linguist and editor of the Jumli Khas dictionary, the proposed draft was prepared based on the Khas language and colloquial language and vernacular spoken in the then Karnali Khas Kingdom. However, on 15 August 2022, the Language Commission of Nepal finalized a phonology with 24 vowels and 41 consonant characters.

=== Vowels ===
Unlike Nepali, Jumli Khas only have 6 oral vowels.

Jumli Khas vowel phonemes
	Front	Central	Back
Close	i		u
Close-mid	e		o
Open-mid			ʌ
Open		a	

=== Consonants ===
Jumli Khas consonant phonemes
			Bilabial	Dental	Alveolar	Retroflex	Palatal	Velar	Glottal
Nasal			m ⟨म⟩		n ⟨न⟩			ŋ ⟨ङ⟩	
Plosive/ Affricate	voiceless	unaspirated	p ⟨प⟩	t ⟨त⟩	t͡s ⟨च⟩	ʈ ⟨ट⟩		k ⟨क⟩	
Plosive/ Affricate	voiceless	aspirated	pʰ ⟨फ⟩	tʰ ⟨थ⟩	t͡sʰ ⟨छ⟩	ʈʰ ⟨ठ⟩		kʰ ⟨ख⟩	
Plosive/ Affricate	voiced	unaspirated	b ⟨ब⟩	d ⟨द⟩	d͡z ⟨ज⟩	ɖ ⟨ड⟩		ɡ ⟨ग⟩	
Plosive/ Affricate	voiced	aspirated	bʱ ⟨भ⟩	dʱ ⟨ध⟩	d͡zʱ ⟨झ⟩	ɖʱ ⟨ढ⟩		ɡʱ ⟨घ⟩	
Fricative					s ⟨स⟩				ɦ ⟨ह⟩
Rhotic					r ⟨र⟩				
Approximant			(w ⟨व⟩)		l ⟨ल⟩		(j ⟨य⟩)		

The standard record regarding the grammar and vocabulary was not collected and standardized as of 2022. On 15 August 2022, at the initiative of the local government, the Language Commission started the process of documenting and archiving the language. According to proposal, 24 vowels and 41 consonant characters were finalized for developing writing system of the language.

== Present status ==
In 2020, twenty-eight schools in Tatopani Rural Municipality of Jumla District started teaching in Jumli Khas language.

== Dictionary ==
In 2008, Ramanand Acharya started compiling the first ever Jumli Khas Dictionary titled Khasiya Akhar. Khas means Khas people and Aakhar means word or a letter. As of 2019, he had collected around 25 thousands words. The collection process has been at a slow rate due to lack of funding. The Karnali Province government allocated funds for the process in the budget of the fiscal year 2077/2078 BS (2020/2021).
