= Doteli =

Indo-Aryan language of Eastern Pahari branch

- Dotyali
- डोटेली
- "Dotyali" written in the Doteli-Devanagari script
- Native to: Sudurpashchim Province; Karnali Province
- Region: Doti
- Native speakers: 495,000 (2021 census)
- Language family: Indo-European: Indo-Iranian; Indo-Aryan; Northern; Eastern Pahari; Doteli
- Writing system: Devanagari script (Doteli alphabet)

Official status
- Official language in: Nepal: Sudurpashchim Province (additional official)
- Recognised minority language in: Nepal: Karnali Province

Language codes
- ISO 639-3: dty
- Glottolog: doty1234
- Doteli speaking areas

A woman from the Achham district of Nepal discusses cooking mutton and fish in the Achhami dialect.

Doteli, or Dotyali (Doteli-Devanagari: डोटेली) is an Indo-Aryan language spoken by about 495,000 people, most of whom live in Nepal. It is developed from Khas. It has official status in Nepal as per Part 1, Section 6 of the Constitution of Nepal 2072 (2015). There are four main dialects of Doteli, namely Baitadeli, Achhami, Bajhangi Nepali, Darchuli and Doteli. The mutual intelligibility between these dialects is high and all dialects of Doteli are able to share language-based materials.

== Phonology ==
=== Vowels ===
Doteli vowel phonemes
	Front	Central	Back
Close	i		u
Close-mid	e		o
Open-mid			ʌ
Open		a	

=== Consonants ===
Doteli consonant phonemes
			Bilabial	Dental	Alveolar	Retroflex	Palatal	Velar	Glottal
Nasal			m ⟨म⟩		n ⟨न⟩			ŋ ⟨ङ⟩	
Plosive/ Affricate	voiceless	unaspirated	p ⟨प⟩	t ⟨त⟩	t͡s ⟨च⟩	ʈ ⟨ट⟩		k ⟨क⟩	
Plosive/ Affricate	voiceless	aspirated	pʰ ⟨फ⟩	tʰ ⟨थ⟩	t͡sʰ ⟨छ⟩	ʈʰ ⟨ठ⟩		kʰ ⟨ख⟩	
Plosive/ Affricate	voiced	unaspirated	b ⟨ब⟩	d ⟨द⟩	d͡z ⟨ज⟩	ɖ ⟨ड⟩		ɡ ⟨ग⟩	
Plosive/ Affricate	voiced	aspirated	bʱ ⟨भ⟩	dʱ ⟨ध⟩	d͡zʱ ⟨झ⟩	ɖʱ ⟨ढ⟩		ɡʱ ⟨घ⟩	
Fricative					s ⟨स⟩				ɦ ⟨ह⟩
Rhotic					r ⟨र⟩				
Approximant			(w ⟨व⟩)		l ⟨ल⟩		(j ⟨य⟩)		

== Example short phrases ==
Words/Phrases	Transliteration	English Translation
नमस्कार	Namaskar	Hello (formal)
तमरो नाम कि हो	Tamaro naam ki ho	What is your name?
तम काँ बठे आया हौ	Tam kan bathe aaya hou	Where are you from?
तम कसा छौ	Tam kasa chhau	How are you?
मुई निको छुँ	Mui niko chhu	I'm fine.
तम काँ झान्या हौ	Tam kan jhanya hou	Where are you going? / Where will you go?
कि भ्यो / कि भयो	Ki bhyo / ki bhayo	What happened?
छाँटो घर आया	Chhanto ghar aaya	Come home soon.

== Names of the language ==
The language is known by various names in the far–western region of Nepal, according to the districts.

Terms used for language name by district
District	Terms used for language name
Kailali	Baitadeli, Bajhangi–Nepali
Kanchanpur	Baitadeli–Nepali, Pahadi, Nepali
Doti	Dotyali, Doteli
Dadeldhura	Dotyali, Dadeldhuri
Achham	Achhami, Achhami-Nepali
Baitadi	Baitadi, Baitadeli, Dotyali
Darchula	Darchuleli, Dotyali, Sauka
Bajhang	Bajhangi, Bajhangi–Nepali

== Official status ==
The Language Commission of Nepal has recommended Dotyali language as official language in Sudurpashchim Province.

== Origin and history ==
Although Dotyali isn't fully intelligible with standard Nepali, Dotyali is considered a member of the macrolanguage Nepali. In Nepal, Doteli is considered a Nepali dialect. However, local intellectuals and people of Doti, those who speak Doteli, are increasingly demanding their language to be recognized as one of the national languages of Nepal.
