= Kailali District =

- District
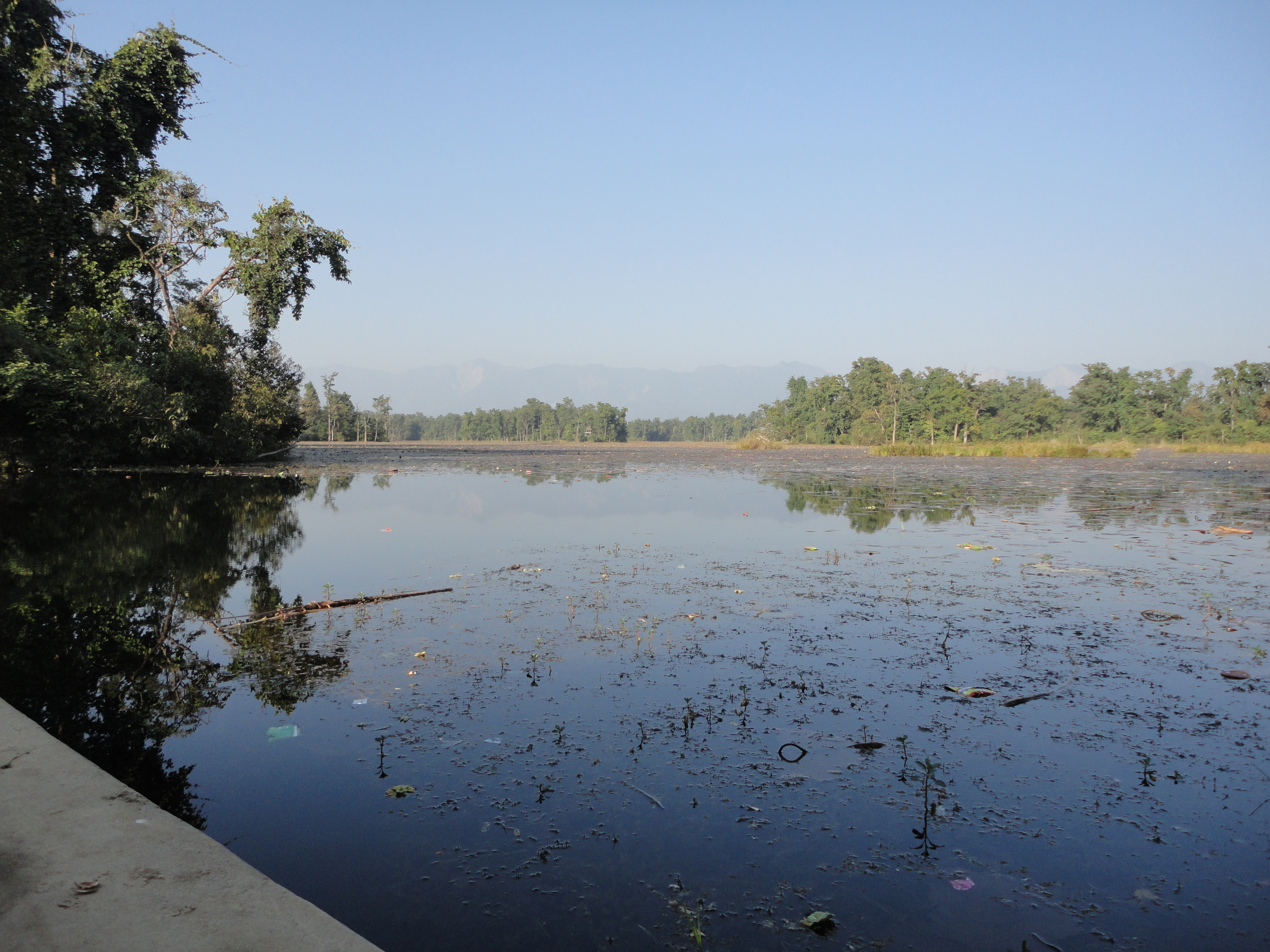
- Ghodaghodi Tal, Kailali

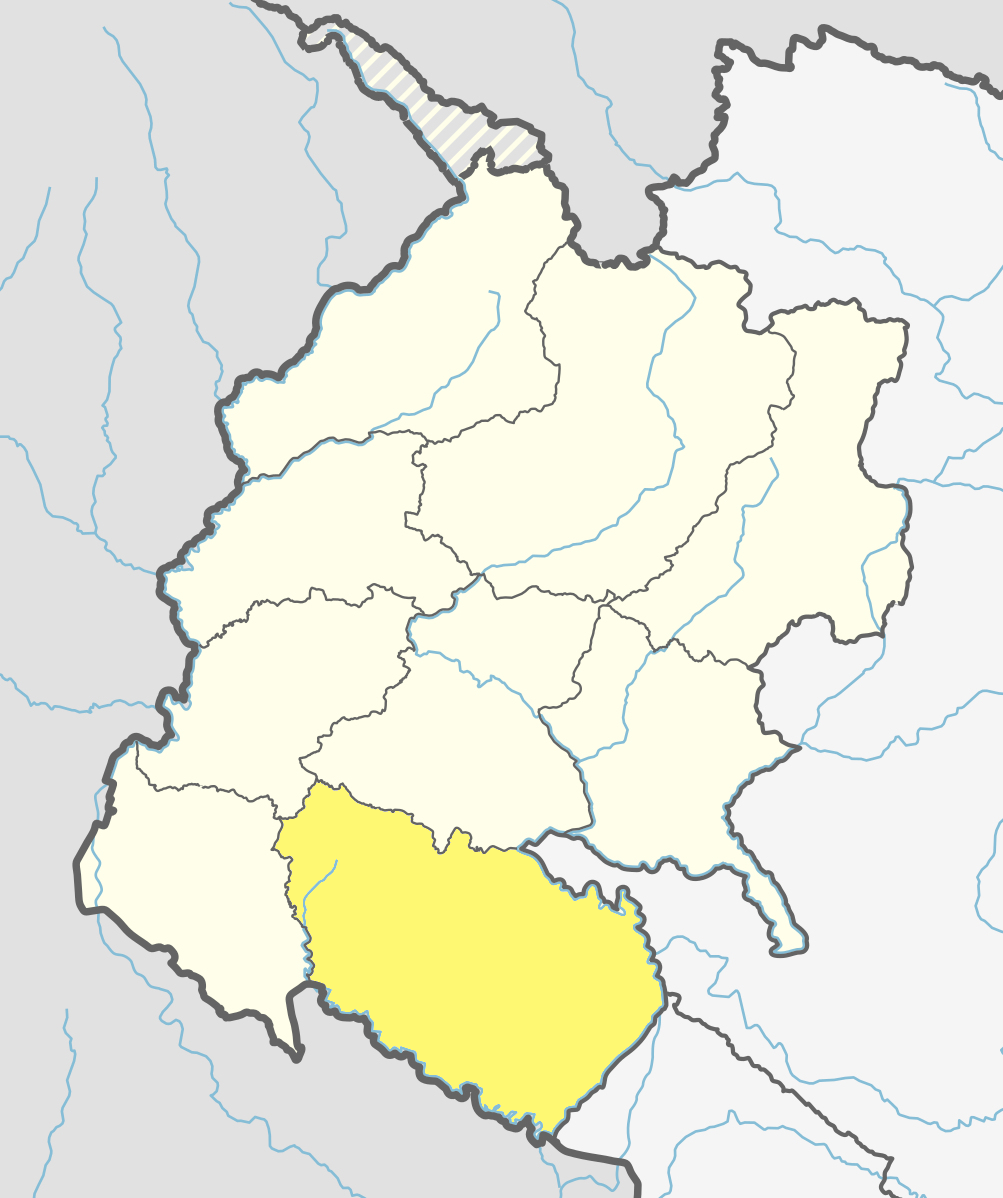
- Location of Kailali District
- Coordinates: 28°41′N 80°52′E
- Country: Nepal
- Province: Sudurpashchim Province
- Admin HQ.: Dhangadhi

Government
  - Type: Coordination committee
  - Body: DCC, Kailali

Area
  - Total: 3,235 km^{2} (1,249 sq mi)

Population (2021)
  - Total: 911,155
  - Density: 281.7/km^{2} (730/sq mi)
- Time zone: UTC+05:45 (NPT)
- Postal Codes: 10900
- Area code: 91
- Main Language(s): Tharu, Nepali language, Doteli
- Website: ddckailali.gov.np

Kailali District (Nepali: कैलाली जिल्ला), a part of Sudurpashchim Province in Terai plain, is one of the seventy-seven districts of Nepal. The district, with Dhangadhi as its district headquarters, covers an area of 3,235 square kilometres (1,249 mi^{2}) and has a population of 911,155 (2021 census) and (775,709 in 2011 census), (616,697 in 2001 census).

Before the reunification of Nepal by Gorkha King Prithivi Narayan Shah, this district was part of the Doti Kingdom. Nepal lost it to the East India Company after the Anglo-Nepalese war (1814-1816) between the then Kingdom of Nepal and the East India Company followed by territorial concessions under the Sugauli Treaty. Later on after the treaty of 1860, Nepal recovered this land along with Kanchanpur, Banke and Bardiya.

== Geography and climate ==
- Latitude: 28.22" North to 29.5" North
- Longitude: 80.30" East to 81.18" East
- Borders: East-Karnali River, Bardiyar-Surkhet, West-Kanchanpur and Dadeldhura, North-Doti-Dadelddhura and Surkhet, South-Mohana River and the Indian state of Uttar Pradesh
- Area: 3,235 square kilometers (40.3% hills and 59.7% Terai)
- Highest point: 1,950 meters
- Lowest point: 109 meters
- Land cover: Chure hilly region and Terai region

Climate zone	Elevation range	% of area
Lower Tropical	below 300 meters (1,000 ft)	59.3%
Upper Tropical	300 to 1,000 meters 1,000 to 3,300 ft.	25.9%
Subtropical	1,000 to 2,000 meters 3,300 to 6,600 ft.	13.8%

== Demographics ==
Historical population
Census year	Pop.	±% p.a.
1981	257,905	—
1991	417,891	+4.94%
2001	616,697	+3.97%
2011	775,709	+2.32%
2021	911,155	+1.62%
Source: Citypopulation

At the time of the 2021 Nepal census, Kailali District had a population of 904,666. 7.77% of the population is under 5 years of age. It has a literacy rate of 77.61% and a sex ratio of 1087 females per 1000 males. 682,430 (75.43%) lived in municipalities.

Castes/ethnic groups in Kailali district (2021)
1. Tharu (36.0%)
2. Chhetri (23.8%)
3. Bahun (12.9%)
4. Kami (8.77%)
5. Thakuri (4.58%)
6. Magar (3.45%)
7. Damai (2.84%)
8. Rana Tharu (2.41%)
9. Sarki (1.49%)
10. Other Hill Janjati (1.06%)
11. Others (2.63%)

Khas people make up a majority of the population with 55% of the population. Tharus and Rana Tharus are the largest minority (and largest single community) with 38% of the population. Hill Janjatis, mainly Magars, are 5% of the population.

Languages of Kailali district (2021)
1. Nepali (36.5%)
2. Tharu (35.9%)
3. Doteli (14.2%)
4. Achhami (4.33%)
5. Rana Tharu (2.27%)
6. Magar (1.15%)
7. Bajhangi (0.90%)
8. Others (4.86%)

At the time of the 2021 census, 36.47% of the population spoke Nepali, 35.86% Tharu, 14.16% Doteli, 4.33% Achhami, 2.27% Rana Tharu, 1.15% Magar and 0.90% Bajhangi as their first language. In 2011, 27.3% of the population spoke Nepali as their first language.

Religion in Kailali District (2021)
Religion	Percent
Hinduism	95.91%
Christianity	2.06%
Buddhism	1.31%
Islam	0.64%
Other or not stated	0.08%

== Administration ==
The district consists of 13 Local Levels, of which one is a sub-metropolitan city, six are urban municipalities and six are rural municipalities. These are as follows:

- Dhangadhi Sub-Metropolitan City
- Lamki Chuha Municipality
- Tikapur Municipality
- Ghodaghodi Municipality
- Bhajani Municipality
- Godawari Municipality
- Gauriganga Municipality
- Janaki Rural Municipality
- Bardagoriya Rural Municipality
- Mohanyal Rural Municipality
- Kailari Rural Municipality
- Joshipur Rural Municipality
- Chure Rural Municipality

== See also ==
- Sainik Awasiya Mahavidyalaya Teghari Kailali
- Sudurpashchim Province
