= Miss Grand Nepal =

National beauty contest in Nepal

- Formation: August 23, 2016; 10 years ago
- Type: Beauty Pageant
- Headquarters: Kathmandu
- Location: Nepal
- Official language: English, Nepali
- Miss Grand Nepal License Holder: Miss Vibhaa (Since 2023)
- MGI All Stars Nepal License Holder: NOVA International (Since 2026)
- Affiliations: Miss Grand International

Miss Grand Nepal (Nepali: मिस ग्र्यान्ड नेपाल) is a title awarded to Nepali woman to represent at Miss Grand International. The contest that chooses the Nepali delegate is Miss Vibhaa since 2023.Sumnima Puri from Karnali Province will represent Nepal at Miss Grand International 2026, as announced by Miss Vibhaa pageant.

== History ==
The pageant was founded in 2016 by a Kathmandu-based businessperson Sazum Katwal of Looks Entertainment,. Nepal's first three representatives were appointed to the position without taking part in any national pageant. The first edition of Miss Grand Nepal happened after a Kathmandu-based event organizer Looks Entertainment Pvt. Ltd. (Mero Looks) had obtained the license in 2016, the contest was held at Hyatt Regency Hotel in Kathmandu on 23 August, where Zeenus Lama was named the winner. Despite being unable to join the 2016 international pageant due to document issues, Zeenus was instead appointed to compete internationally at the 2017 pageant in Vietnam.

Under the management of RK Entertainment Group from 2017 to 2018, audition events were held across Nepal to find contestants for the pageant. In 2019 the RK group lost its Miss Grand Nepal franchise to Bollywood Showdown Nepal Pvt. Ltd. of Izodom Nepal & Cosmo Group. The contest was only held twice, in 2020 and 2022, in other years, representatives were appointed.

The Miss Grand Nepal Beauty Pageant is now under Miss Vibhaa led by Uddhab Adhikari.

== Editions ==
=== Date and venue ===
The following list is the edition details of the Miss Grand Nepal contest, since its inception in 2016. Presently, Miss Vibhaa by Umanga Creations is the official licensee of Miss Grand Nepal as assigned by Miss Grand International. There was direct appointment of titleholders from 2013 to 2015, 2019, 2021 and 2023, hence no competitions held.

Edition	Date	Final venue	Entrants	Ref.
1st	23 August 2016	Hyatt Regency Hotel, Taragaon, Kathmandu	10	
2nd	4 August 2018	Hotel Gurkha Heritage, Kathmandu	10	
3rd	13 December 2020	Mojo Boutique Hotel, Baneshwor, Kathmandu	10	
4th	15 September 2022	Hotel Shanker, Kathmandu	14	

== Titleholders ==
Year	Miss Grand Nepal	Runners-up		Organizers	Ref.
Year	Miss Grand Nepal	1st runner-up	2nd runner-up	Organizers	Ref.
2013	Ashmita Sitoula	No runners up		Looks Entertainment	
2014	Srijana Regmi	No runners up		Looks Entertainment	
2015	Jenita Basnet	No runners up		Looks Entertainment	
2016	Zeenus Lama	Pooja Shrestha	Jyotsana Maharjan	Looks Entertainment	
2018	Urussa Joshi	Sireng Eksha Maden	Riya Gaihre	RK Entertainment	
2019	Nisha Pathak	No runners up		Bolly Group Nepal	
2020	Ambika Rana	Sujina Shahi	Sujata Gurung	Bolly Group Nepal	
2021	Ronali Amatya	No runners up		Bolly Group Nepal	
2022	Aishworya Shrestha	Barsha Bhandari	Rakchya Upreti	Bolly Group Nepal	
2023	Garima Ghimire	No runners up		Miss Vibhaa	
2024	Prema Lamgade	No runners up		Miss Vibhaa	
2025	Jessica Singh Thakuri	Nishita Joshi	Nisha Shrestha	Miss Vibhaa	
2026	Sumnima Puri	_	_	Miss Vibhaa	

== Winners' gallery ==
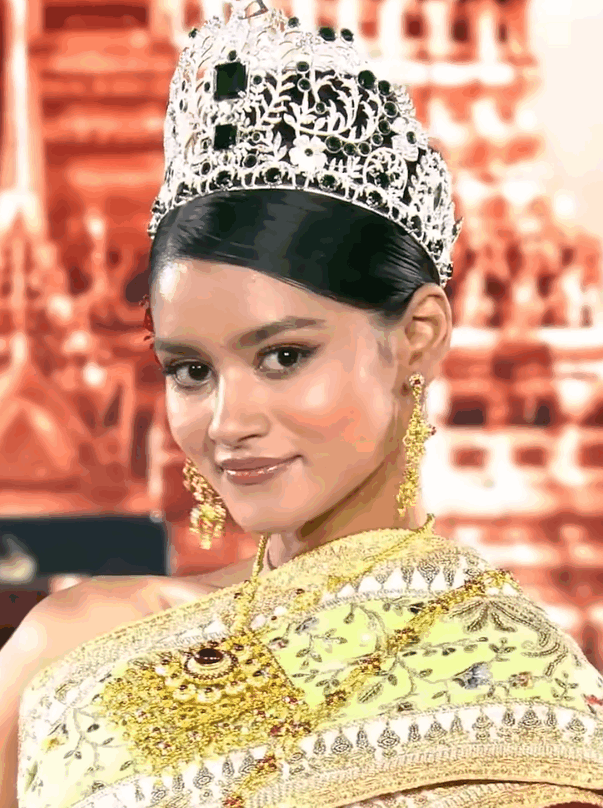
Jessica Singh Thakuri, 2025

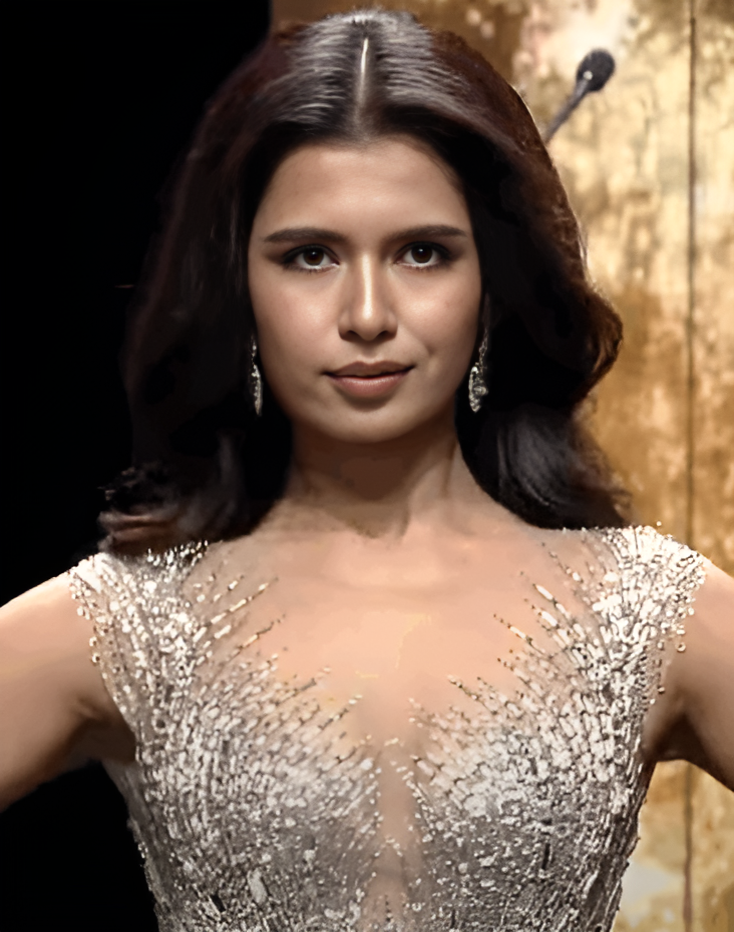
Prema Lamgade, 2024

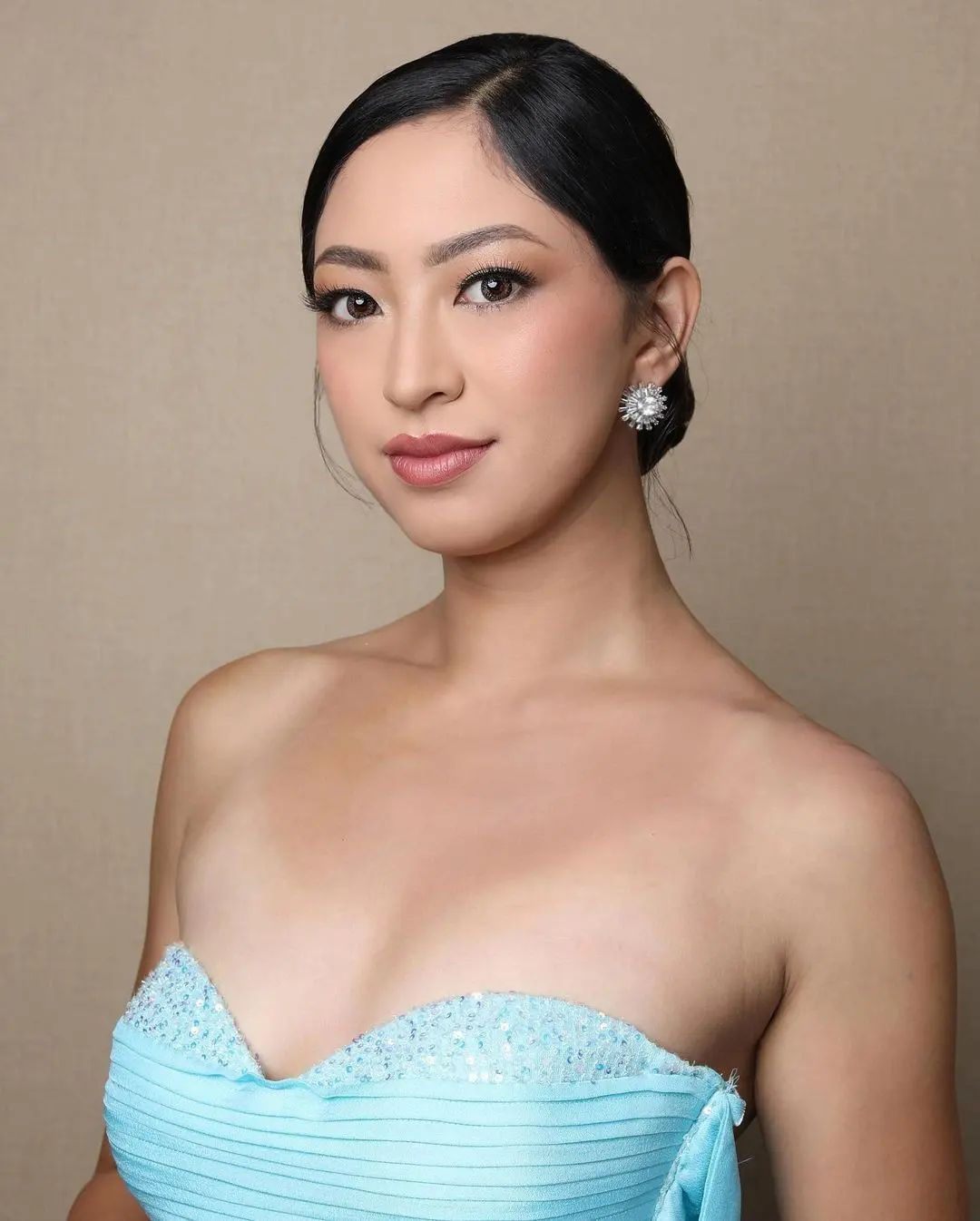
Aishworya Shrestha, 2022

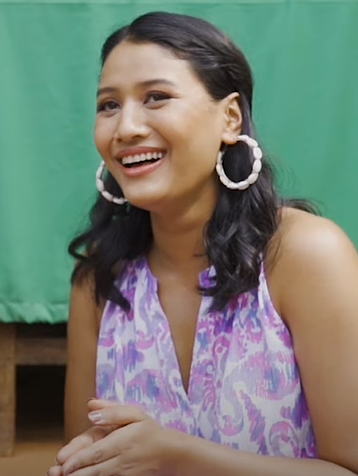
Ronali Amatya, 2021

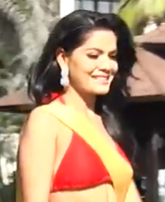
Jenita Basnet, 2015

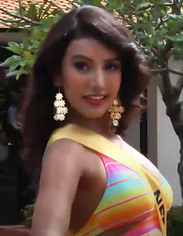
Srijana Regmi, 2014

== Nepal at Miss Grand International ==
- : Declared the winner
- : Finished as a runner-up or top 5/6 qualification
- : Finished as one of the finalists or semi-finalists
- : Finished as a special awards winner/qualifier

Year	Miss Grand Nepal	District/ City	National Title	Placement	Special Awards
2026	Sumnima Puri	Surkhet	Miss Grand Nepal 2026	TBA	
2025	Jessica Singh Thakuri	Lalitpur	Miss Vibhaa Grand 2025	Unplaced	
2024	Prema Lamgade	Bhairahawa	Miss Vibhaa Grand 2024	Unplaced	1 Special Awards: Grand Voice (Top 30)
2023	Garima Ghimire	Biratnagar	Miss Vibhaa Grand 2023	Unplaced	
2022	Aishworya Shrestha	Kathmandu	Miss Grand Nepal 2022	Unplaced	
2021	Ronali Amatya	Kathmandu	Miss Grand Nepal 2021	Unplaced	
2020	Ambika Rana	Pokhara	Miss Grand Nepal 2020	Unplaced	
2019	Nisha Pathak	Kathmandu	Top 14 at Miss Nepal 2019	Unplaced	
2018	Urussa Joshi	Kathmandu	Miss Grand Nepal 2018	Unplaced	1 Special Awards: Top 20 - Best in National Costume
2017	Zeenus Lama	Rampur	Miss Grand Nepal 2016	Unplaced	1 Special Awards: Top 10 - Best in Evening Gala Performance
2016	Zeenus Lama	Rampur	Miss Grand Nepal 2016	Did not compete	
2015	Jenita Basnet	Kathmandu	Miss Grand Nepal 2015	Unplaced	1 Special Awards: Top 10 - Miss Popular Vote
2014	Srijana Regmi	Kathmandu	Miss Grand Nepal 2014	Unplaced	1 Special Awards: Top 11 - Miss Popular Vote
2013	Ashmita Sitoula	Jhapa	Top 10 of Miss Nepal 2013	Unplaced	

== MGI All Stars Nepal ==
The title holder of "Miss Grand International All Stars Nepal" is responsible to represent Nepal at Miss Grand International All Stars edition.

MGI All Stars Nepal Titleholders
Organizer	Edition	MGI All Stars Nepal	International Results		
Organizer	Edition	MGI All Stars Nepal	Final Placement	Preliminary Judges' Score (10)	Special Awards
NOVA International	2nd	Smriti Shrestha, Manthali	TBA	TBA	TBA
NOVA International	2nd	Prema Lamgade, Bhairahawa	TBA	TBA	TBA
NOVA International	1st	Sanskriti Bhatta, Dhangadhi	Unplaced	7.02	None
