= Miss Grand Nepal 2018 =

2nd Miss Grand Nepal competition, beauty pageant edition

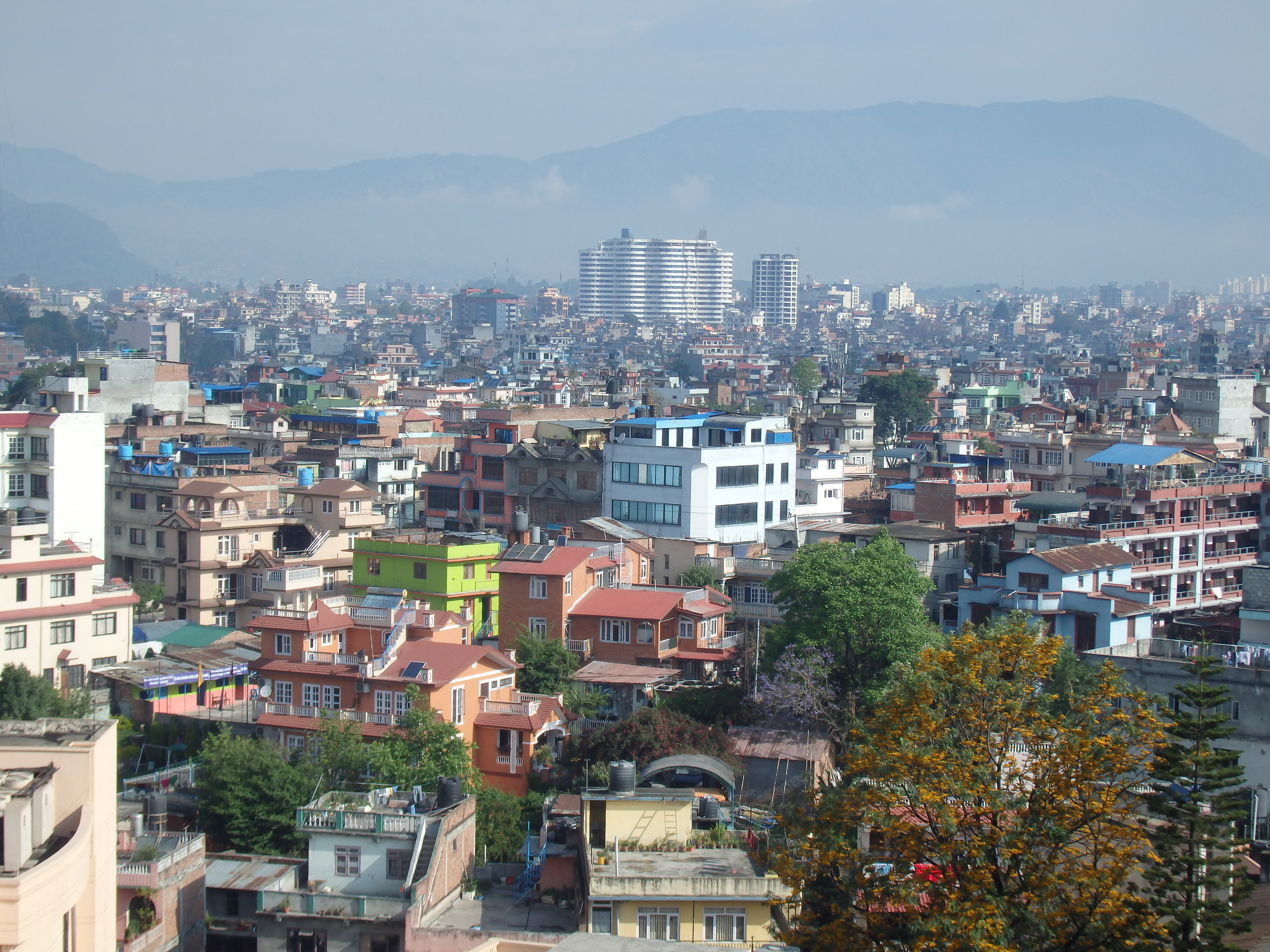
- Kathmandu, the host city of the contest
- Date: 4 August 2018
- Venue: Hotel Gurkha Heritage, Kathmandu
- Broadcaster: YouTube
- Entrants: 10
- Placements: 5
- Winner: Urussa Joshi; Kathmandu
- Photogenic: Riya Gaihre (Nepal) Chitwan

External videos
- Miss Grand Nepal 2018 Grand Finale, on 24 June 2019, YouTube video on Internet Archive

Miss Grand Nepal 2018 was the second edition of the Miss Grand Nepal beauty pageant, held on August 4, 2018, at the Hotel Gurkha Heritage in Kathmandu. Ten contestants, who qualified through the auditions held countrywide, competed for the title, of whom a 26-year-old media personality from Kathmandu, Urussa Joshi, was named the winner, and received रु50,000 rupee cash and a Suzuki scooter as the prize, while the first and the second runners-up, Eksha Maden of Dhangadhi and Riya Gaihre of Lalitpur, obtained cash of रु30,000 and रु20,000 rupee, respectively. Urussa Joshi then represented Nepal at Miss Grand International 2018 held later that year on October 25 in Myanmar, but she got a non-placement.

The event was showcased under the direction of the RK Entertainment Group.

== Background ==
After the RK Entertainment Group took over the competition license of the Miss Grand Nepal beauty pageant from Looks Entertainment in late 2017, the organization announced the launch of the 2018 edition in mid-2018, with the first phase auditions happening in Kathmandu, Pokhara, Nawalparasi, and Dharan, and then all qualified candidates were finalized to ten in the final audition round in Kathmandu. The whole process of the audition was conducted from May 12 to June 9. A press conference was held on May 10, 2018, at the Royal Empire Hotel in Kathmandu, wherein the organizer revealed the details related to the contest.

The auditions started on May 12 in Pokhara, then moved to Chitwan on May 14, to Butwal on May 16, and then to Dharan on May 18, while an online application was given a June 8 deadline. All qualified candidates were additionally narrowed to ten in the final audition held on June 9 in Kathmandu, and the national final is scheduled for August 4, at the Hotel Gurkha Heritage.

== Result ==
Color keys

- The contestant Won in an International pageant.
- The contestant was a Runner-up in an International pageant.
- The contestant was a Semi-Finalist in an International pageant.
- The contestant assumed another title.
- The contestant was not able to compete in an International pageant.
- The contestant did not place but won a Special Award in the pageant.
- The contestant did not place.

Final results	Contestant	International pageant	International Results
Miss Grand Nepal 2018 (Winner)	Kathmandu - Urussa Joshi	Miss Grand International 2018	Unplaced; Top 20 - Best in National Costume
1st runner-up	(Nepal) Dharan - Sireng Eksha Maden		
2nd runner-up	(Nepal) Chitwan - Riya Gaihre		
Top 5	Kathmandu – Prapti Laxmi Sen		
Top 5	Kathmandu – Sushmita Tamang		

=== Sub-Titles ===
Award	Contestant
Miss Catwalk	Kathmandu - Urussa Joshi
Miss Personality	(Nepal) Dharan - Sireng Eksha Maden
Miss Talent	(Nepal) Chitwan - Riya Gaihre
Miss Photogenic	(Nepal) Chitwan - Riya Gaihre
Miss Best Figure	Kathmandu - Sushmita Tamang
Miss Multimedia	(Nepal) Pokhara - Sanjita Ranabhat
Miss Best Speech	Kathmandu - Sushmita Tamang
Miss Best Report	Kathmandu - Sara Kapali

== Contestants ==
10 contestants competed for the title of Miss Grand Nepal 2018.

No.	Contestants	Province	Placement
1	Sushmita Tamang	Kathmandu	Top 5 Miss Best Speech; Miss Best Figure
2	Sara Kapali	Kathmandu	Miss Best Report
3	Prapti Laxmi Sen	Kathmandu	Top 5
4	Sanjita Ranabhat	(Nepal) Pokhara	Miss Multimedia
5	Mala Thapa Magar	(Nepal) Nawalparasi	
6	Sweckshya Rai	(Nepal) Pokhara	
7	Siwani Lamichhane	Kathmandu	
8	Riya Gaihre	(Nepal) Chitwan	2nd runner-up Miss Photogenic; Miss Talent
9	Sireng Eksha Maden	(Nepal) Dharan	1st runner-up Miss Personality
10	Urussa Joshi	Kathmandu	Miss Grand Nepal 2018; Miss Catwalk
