= Ambika Rana =

Businesswomen & beauty pageant titleholder

- Born: 2 July 1999 (age 27)
- Other name: Ambika Joshi Rana
- Education: Birla Institute of Technology and Science, Pilani – Dubai Campus; Loreto Convent School; St Margaret's School
- Beauty pageant titleholder
- Title: Miss Grand Nepal 2020
- Major competitions: Miss Grand Nepal 2020; (Winner); Miss Nepal 2024; (Top 13)

Ambika Rana (Nepali: अम्बिका राणा; born 2 July 1999) is a Nepalese businesswomen, model and beauty pageant titleholder who was crowned Miss Grand Nepal 2020.

== Early life and education ==
Rana was born in to a Medical family from Pokhara, Nepal. She moved to Shillong, India to pursue her education from Loreto Convent School and St Margaret's School.Professionally, she is a business woman and is involved in philanthropic entrepreneurship . She worked with Mother Teresa Foundation helping women and victims of domestic violence. In 2020, she founded Arka Foundation which helps underprivileged people by providing health post and create job opportunities for a sustainable livelihood.

In 2022, Ambika started studying Business and Innovative Medicine from Birla Institute of Technology and Science, Pilani – Dubai Campus, United Arab Emirates.

== Pageantry ==
In 2018, Ambika was awarded the winner of Artist Support Program - Fashion Artist Edition organized by R.K. Studio Nepal.

=== Miss Grand International 2020 ===
Ambika was crowned as the national winner of Miss Grand Nepal 2020 where she represented Pokhara. Then, represented Nepal at the Miss Grand International 2020 in Bangkok, Thailand. During the international competition, Ambika was listed in Top 30 National Costumes where she wore Green Tara inspired costume.

=== Miss Nepal 2024 ===
In 2024, Ambika represented Pokhara in Miss Nepal beauty pageant. She reached the Top 13 Round of Miss Nepal 2024, along with the award of Miss Visionary.

=== Miss Universe Nepal 2026 ===
In 2026, Ambika joined Miss Universe Nepal 2026, representing Pokhara and finished the contest at Top 5. She continued her advocacy from 2020; Project Mukti and Arka Foundation focused on healthcare, education and financial opportunities for underprivileged families in Bajura.

Awards and achievements
Preceded by Nisha Pathak	Miss Grand Nepal; 2020	Succeeded by Ronali Amatya
