= Miss Grand Nepal 2016 =

1st Miss Grand Nepal competition, beauty pageant edition

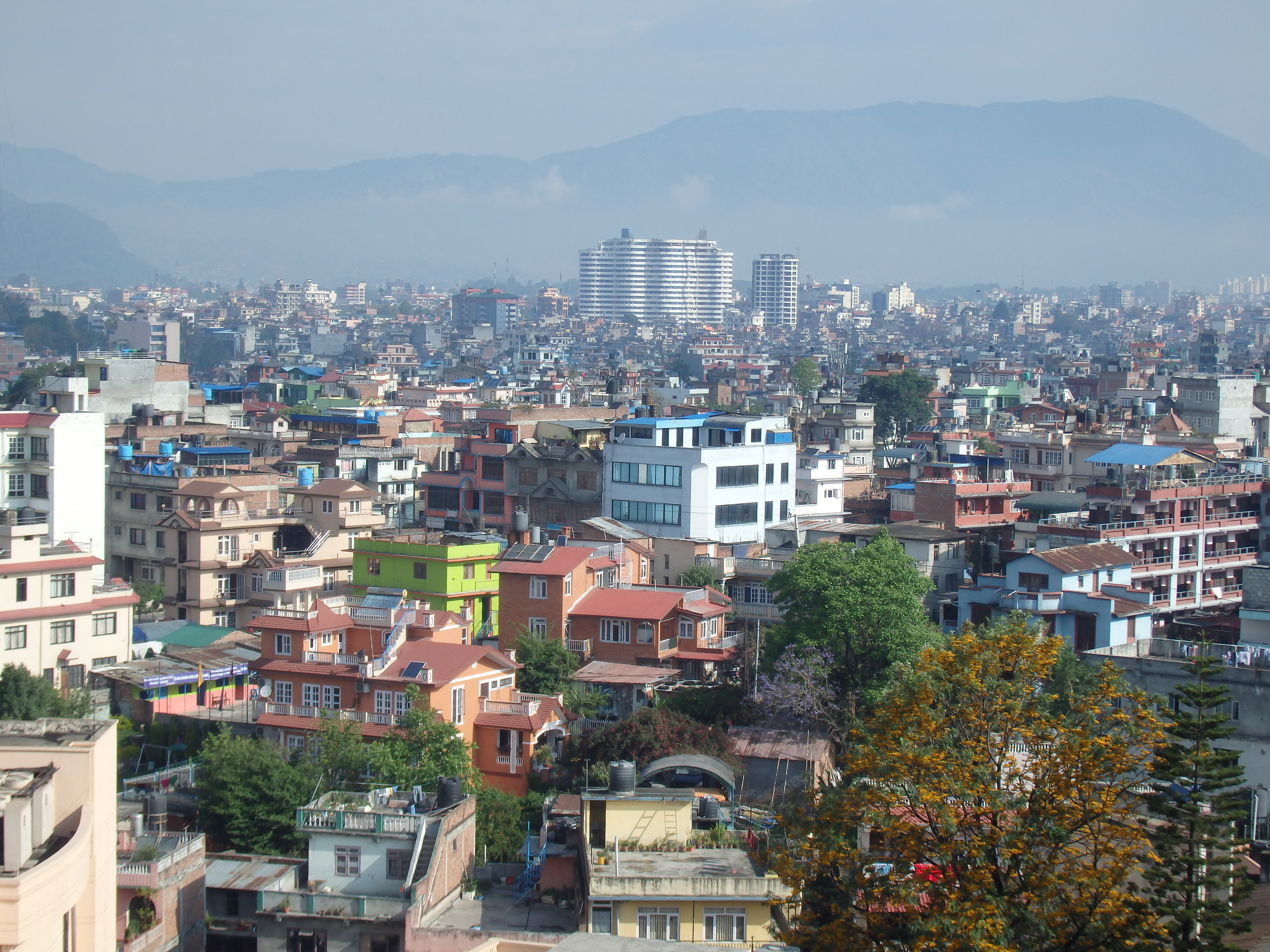
- Kathmandu, the host city of the contest
- Date: 23 August 2016
- Venue: Hyatt Regency Hotel, Taragaon, Kathmandu
- Broadcaster: YouTube
- Entrants: 10
- Placements: 5
- Debuts: Bharatpur; Biratnagar; Butwal; Dhangadhi; Ghorahi; Hetauda; Itahari; Kathmandu; Lalitpur; Pokhara
- Winner: Zeenus Lama (Nepal) Chitwan
- Photogenic: Anugya Chand (Nepal) Dhangadhi

External videos
- Miss Grand Nepal 2016 highlight, on 10 September 2016, YouTube video on Internet Archive

Miss Grand Nepal 2016 was the first edition of the Miss Grand Nepal beauty pageant, held on August 23, 2016, at the Hyatt Regency Hotel in Kathmandu, organized by Mero Looks and Revolution Pvt. Ltd. Ten national aspirants competed for the title, of whom a 24-year-old Mass communication student from Kathmandu, Zeenus Lama, was named the winner, and received रु50,000 Rupee cash as the prize while the first and second runners-up, Pooja Shrestha of Lalitpur and Jyotsana Maharjan of Bharatpur, obtained रु25,000 and रु10,000 Rupee, respectively. The event was attended by Claire Elizabeth Parker, Miss Grand International 2015, and the Ambassador of Thailand to Nepal, Vutti Vuttisant.

Zeenus Lama was supposed to represent Nepal at the international contest, Miss Grand International 2016, on October 25 in Las Vegas, Nevada, but was not able to compete due to difficulties in obtaining a US visa However, she was later invited by the Miss Grand International organizer, Miss Grand International, to represent Nepal in the Miss Grand International 2017 pageant in Vietnam

== Background ==
On January 5, 2016, a press conference was organized at Trisara restaurant in Kathmandu, wherein the organizers, Mero Looks, shared the details related to the Miss Grand Nepal 2016 contest. The team for Miss Grand Nepal includes Asmita Sitoula—the choreographer; Shivangi Lama—the designer; Akanshya Gurung— the makeup artist; and Ayush Krishna Palikhey and Kiran Dhakal—the photographer.

Auditions were conducted in different cities—Kathmandu, Bharatpur, Butwal, Pokhara, and Itahari—to select the contestants, while an online application was officially opened from January 29 to February 5. Of all applicants, only 10 candidates qualified for the national contest in Kathmandu.

== Result ==
| Final results | Contestant | International competition | |
| Final results | Contestant | Pageant | Results |
|---|---|---|---|
| Miss Grand Nepal 2016 | (Nepal) Chitwan - Zeenus Lama' | Miss Grand International 2017 | Unplaced |
| 1st runner-up | (Nepal) Lalitpur - Pooja Shrestha | Miss Supranational 2016 | Unplaced |
| 2nd runner-up | (Nepal) Bharatpur - Jyotsana Maharjan | | |
| Top 5 | (Nepal) Dhangadhi – Anugya Chand | | |
| Top 5 | (Nepal) Hetauda – Yojana Ghale | | |

=== Sub-Titles ===
| Award | Contestant |
|---|---|
| Miss Personality | (Nepal) Chitwan- Zeenus Lama |
| Miss Stylish | (Nepal) Lalitpur - Pooja Shrestha |
| Miss Talent | (Nepal) Ghorahi - Sanisha Shakya |
| Miss Photogenic | (Nepal) Dhangadhi - Anugya Chand |
| Public Choice | (Nepal) Hetauda - Yojana Ghale |

== Contestants ==
| No. | Contestants | Province | Placement |
|---|---|---|---|
| 1 | Zeenus Lama | Kathmandu | Miss Grand Nepal 2016; Miss Personality |
| 2 | Saina Kunwar | (Nepal) Pokhara | |
| 3 | Jyotsana Maharjan | (Nepal) Bharatpur | 2nd runner-up |
| 4 | Pooja Shrestha | (Nepal) Lalitpur | 1st runner-up Miss Supranational Nepal 2016; Miss Stylish |
| 5 | Ausmi Magar | (Nepal) Butwal | |
| 6 | Luza Ranjitkar | (Nepal) Biratnagar | |
| 7 | Anugya Chand | (Nepal) Dhangadhi | Top 5 Miss Photogenic |
| 8 | Sanisha Shakya | (Nepal) Ghorahi | Miss Talent |
| 9 | Sazum Katwal | (Nepal) Itahari | |
| 10 | Yojana Ghale | (Nepal) Hetauda | Top 5 Popular Choice |
