= 2022 Dhangadhi municipal election =

Local election in Nepal

2022 Dhangadhi municipal elections
- 13 May 2022

97 seats to Dhangadhi Sub-Metropolitan City Council 49 seats needed for a majority

	First party	Second party	Third party
Candidate	Gopal Hamal	Nrip Bahadur Wad	Rana Bahadur Chand
Party	Independent	Congress	CPN (UML)
Popular vote	26,865	14,817	9,115
Percentage	51.8%	28.6%	17.6%
- Results for ward chair by party
Mayor before election
Nrip Bahadur Wad
Congress
Elected Mayor
Gopal Hamal
Independent

Municipal election for Dhangadhi took place on 13 May 2022, with all 97 positions up for election across 19 wards. The electorate elected a mayor, a deputy mayor, 19 ward chairs and 76 ward members. An indirect election will also be held to elect five female members and an additional three female members from the Dalit and minority community to the municipal executive.

Independent candidate Gopal Hamal was elected mayor of the sub-metropolitan city defeating incumbent mayor Nrip Bahadur Wad of the Nepali Congress. Congress however regained control of the council.

== Background ==
Dhangadhi was established in 1976 as a municipality. The sub-metropolitan city was created in 2015 by incorporating neighboring village development committees into Dhangadhi municipality. Electors in each ward elect a ward chair and four ward members, out of which two must be female and one of the two must belong to the Dalit community.

In the previous election, Nrip Bahadur Wad from Nepali Congress was elected as mayor.

== Candidates ==
Party	Mayor candidate	Deputy Mayor candidate
Nepali Congress	Nrip Bahadur Wad	
Independent	Gopal Hamal	
Rastriya Prajatantra Party		Durga Dutt Pant
CPN (Unified Marxist–Leninist)	Rana Bahadur Chand	Kandakala Rana Tharu
CPN (Maoist Centre)		Shanti Adhikari
People's Socialist Party, Nepal	Kalendra Airee	
Loktantrik Samajwadi Party, Nepal	Basanta Bahadur Bishwakarma	
Nagarik Unmukti Party	Nim Kumar Chaudhary	Sabitra Chaudhary

== Opinion poll ==
Date	News agency	Sample size	Gopal Hamal	Nrip Bahadur Wad	Rana Bahadur Chand	None	Undecided	Result
10 May 2022	Setopati	100	39	31	12	14	4	Hung
10 May 2022	Setopati	100	39%	31%	21%	14%	4%	Hung

== Results ==
=== Mayoral election ===
Mayoral elections result
Party	Candidate	Votes	%	±%
Independent	Gopal Hamal	26,865	51.8%	+27.7%
Congress	Nrip Bahadur Wad	14,817	28.6%	−1.4%
CPN (UML)	Rana Bahadur Chand	9,115	17.6%	−3.2%
Nagrik Unmukti	Nim Kumar Chaudhary	805	1.6%	New
Others		276	0.5%	
Total votes		51,878	100.0%	
Independent gain from Congress		Swing	+14.6%	

Deputy mayoral elections result
Party	Candidate	Votes	%	±%
CPN (UML)	Kandakala Kumari Rana	15,479	39.0%	+10.4%
Maoist Centre	Shanti Kumari Adhikari	12,670	32.0%	+9.0%
Independent	Prabha Kar Bhandari	6,609	16.7%	New
RPP	Durga Dutt Pant	3,301	8.3%	+3.9%
Nagrik Unmukti	Sabitri Devi Chaudhary	1,133	2.9%	New
Bibeksheel Sajha	Bimala Pant	461	1.2%	New
Total votes		39,653	100.0%	
CPN (UML) gain from Congress		Swing	+24.8%	

=== Ward results ===
Summary of Partywise Ward chairman and Ward member seats won, 2022
Party	Chairman	Members
Nepali Congress	11	48
CPN (Unified Marxist-Leninist)	6	24
CPN (Maoist Centre)	2	4
Total	19	76

==== Summary of results by ward ====
Position	1	2	3	4	5	6	7	8	9	10	11	12	13	14	15	16	17	18	19
Chairman																			
Open Member 1																			
Open Member 2																			
Female Member																			
Female Dalit Member																			
Source: Election Commission

== Council formation ==
Party	Mayor	Deputy Mayor	Ward Chairman	Ward Members	Total seats	Remarks
Independent	1		0	0	0	
Nepali Congress			11	48	59	Majority
Communist Party of Nepal (UML)			6	24	30	
CPN (Maoist Centre)		1	2	4	7	
Total	1	1	19	76	97	49 for Majority

== See also ==
- 2022 Nepalese local elections
- 2022 Lalitpur municipal election
- 2022 Kathmandu municipal election
- 2022 Janakpur municipal election
- 2022 Pokhara municipal election
