= Urma =

Urma उर्मा
- former Village development committee
- Location in Nepal
- Coordinates: 28.71°N 80.71°E
- Country: Nepal
- Zone: Seti Zone
- District: Kailali District

Population (1991)
  - Total: 7,997
- Time zone: UTC+5:45 (Nepal Time)

Urma was a village development committee in Kailali District in the Seti Zone of western Nepal. It was merged into Dhangadhi in 2015. At the time of the 1991 Nepal census it had a population of 7,997, living in 845 individual households.
