= Gopal Hamal =

Nepalese politician

Mayor Gopal Hamal
- गोपाल हमाल
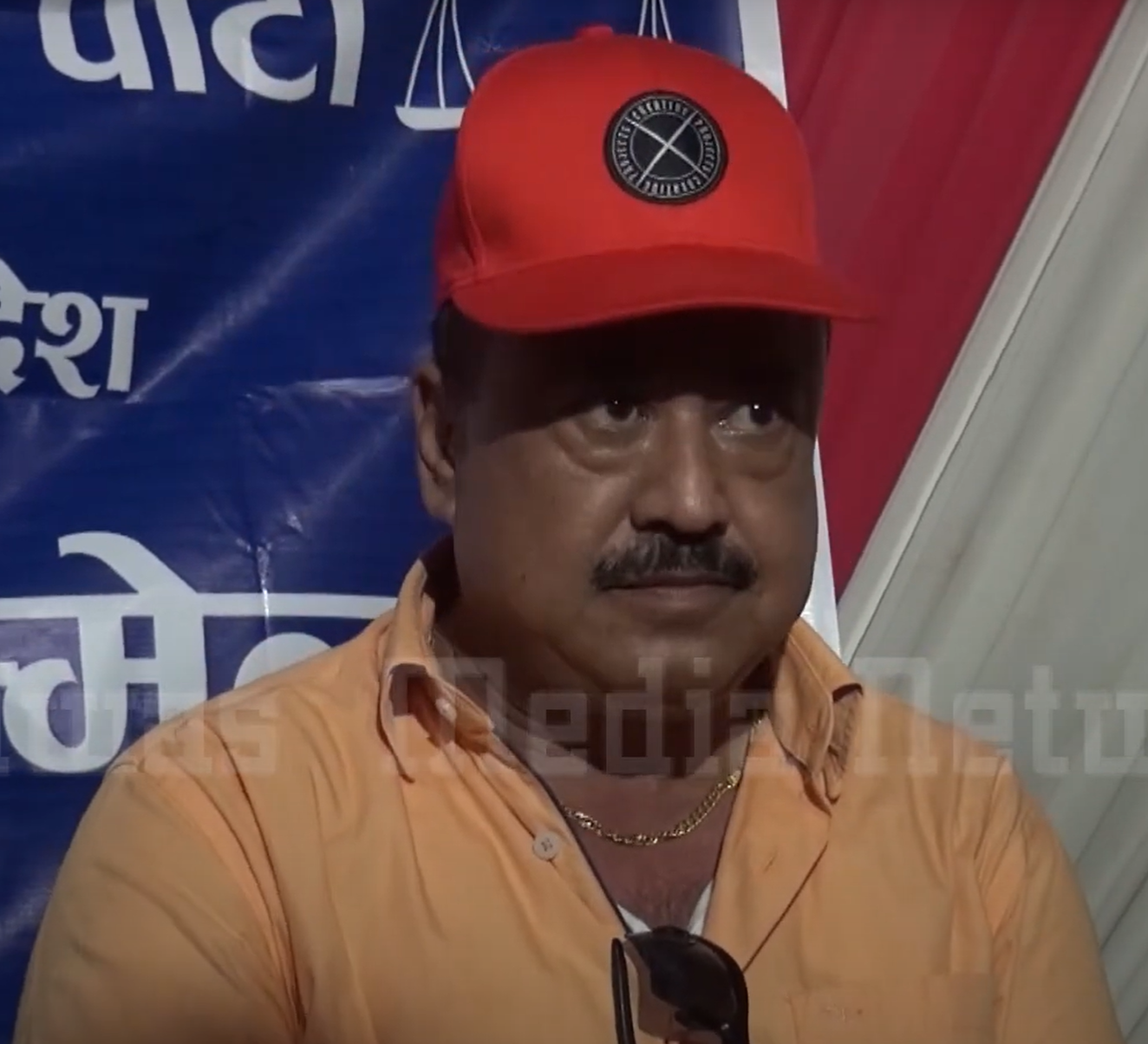
- Hamal in 2022

Mayor of Dhangadhi
- Incumbent
- Assumed office 22 May 2022
- Deputy: Kandakala Kumari Rana
- Preceded by: Nrip Bahadur Wad

Personal details
- Party: Independent
- Occupation: Politician; social activist; businessman

Gopal Hamal (Nepali: गोपाल हमाल), also known as Gopi Hamal, is a Nepalese politician, social worker, and current mayor of Dhangadhi sub metropolitan city. He announced his candidacy as an independent candidate and won the 2022 election with more than 51 percent of the vote. He has been mayor since May 2022. Prior to this he also contested in 2017 Dhangadhi municipal election, but lost by around 2,700 votes.

== Electoral history ==
=== 2022 Dhangadhi municipal election ===
Mayoral elections result
Party	Candidate	Votes	%	±%
Independent	Gopal Hamal	26,865	51.8%	+27.7%
Congress	Nrip Bahadur Wad	14,817	28.6%	−1.4%
CPN (UML)	Rana Bahadur Chand	9,115	17.6%	−3.2%
Nagrik Unmukti	Nim Kumar Chaudhary	805	1.6%	New
Others		276	0.5%	
Total votes		51,878	100.0%	
Independent gain from Congress		Swing	+14.6%	

Preceded by Nrip Bahadur Wad	Mayor of Dhangadhi; 2022–present	Incumbent
