= Dhangadhi =

Dhangadhi धनगढी
- Sub-Metropolitan City
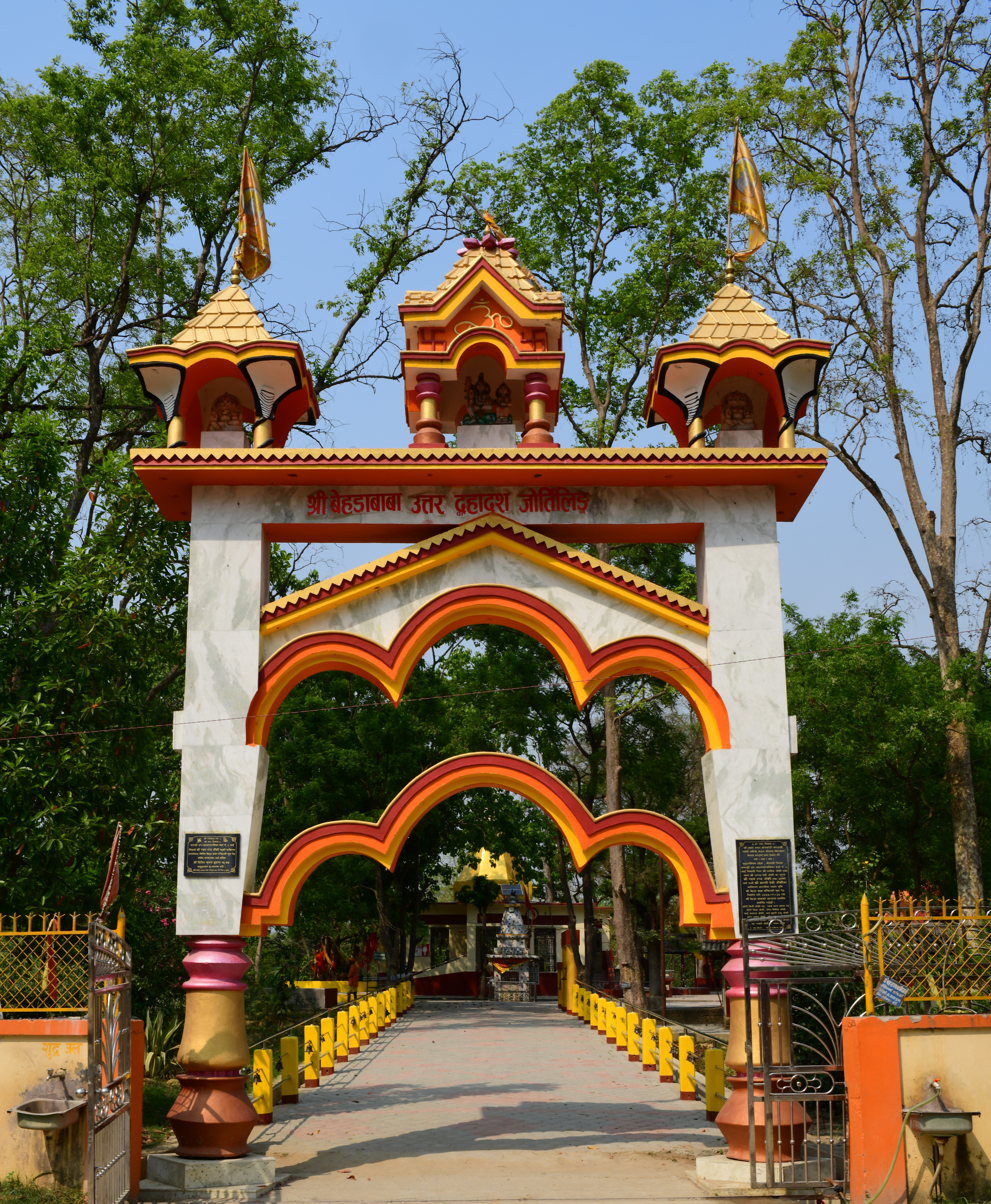
- Behda Baba Temple
- Interactive map of Dhangadhi
- Location in Nepal Dhangadhi (Nepal)
- Coordinates: 28°42′49″N 80°34′09″E
- Country: Nepal
- Province: Sudurpashchim
- District: Kailali

Government
  - Mayor: Gopal Hamal (Independent)
  - Deputy Mayor: Kandakala Kumari Rana (UML)

Area
  - Total: 271.74 km^{2} (104.92 sq mi)
- Elevation: 109 m (358 ft)

Population (2021)
  - Total: 198,792
  - Rank: 8th largest
  - Density: 731.55/km^{2} (1,894.7/sq mi)
- Time zone: UTC+5:45 (NST)
- Post code: 10900
- Area code: 091
- Website: www.dhangadhimun.gov.np

Dhangadhi (Nepali: धनगढी) is a sub-metropolitan city and the district headquarters of Kailali District in Sudurpashchim Province of Nepal. It shares a border with India in the south, Godawari and Gauriganga Municipality in the North, Kailari Rural Municipality in the east and Kanchanpur District in the west. Dhangadhi is a sub-metropolis divided into 19 wards. It has an area of 271.74 Square kilometer. It is one of the major cities of Far-west Province (Sudurpashchim) of Nepal along with Mahendranagar, Dadeldhura, and Patan. The city is connected with the Bhimdutta Highway, about 660 kilometers west of Kathmandu.

Dhangadhi was established in 1976 as a municipality. The population was 198,792 as per the 2021 Nepal census. It is the most densely populated city in the province. It became the first sub-metropolitan city in the far-west after it was transformed to a sub-metropolis from municipality status on 18 September 2015. This added village development committees Fulbari and Urma into Dhangadhi and later wards 9 and 11 of former Attariya Municipality were also merged.

Dhangadhi is the biggest city in western Nepal and the largest Sub-metropolitan city in Nepal. Dhangadhi is known for its love for the sports Cricket and often called City of Cricket.

== History ==
Dhangadhi lies in the Kailali District, historically part of the Tharu heartland in the fertile Terai plains. The region was long inhabited by Tharu communities, who developed their own agrarian culture and traditions. Before Nepal’s unification, this area was under the Doti Kingdom, one of the principalities of the Baise (22) Rajyas. During the unification of Nepal (around 1790s) by King Prithvi Narayan Shah’s successors, Doti and its lowland territories (including modern Kailali and Kanchanpur) were annexed into the Gorkha Kingdom. The Kailali area became a frontier region, strategically located near the British India border. The region was sparsely populated at the time due to the dangers of malaria and dense forest cover. After the Anglo-Nepalese War (1814–1816), the Sugauli Treaty forced Nepal to cede large tracts of the western Terai — including Kailali, Kanchanpur, Banke, and Bardiya — to the British East India Company. For several decades, Dhangadhi fell under British India’s control. In 1860, as a gesture of friendship for Nepal’s assistance in suppressing the Indian Sepoy Mutiny (1857), the British returned these “Naya Muluk” (new territories) — Kailali, Kanchanpur, Banke, and Bardiya — to Nepal under Jung Bahadur Rana. This marked the formal reintegration of Dhangadhi into Nepal. Dhangadhi began as a small border settlement and customs post for trade with India (across Gauriphanta). During the Rana regime, limited infrastructure was built, but modernization accelerated after Nepal’s 1951 democratic revolution. In the 1960s–70s, government malaria eradication programs led to large-scale migration from hilly regions (mainly from Baitadi, Doti, Achham, Bajhang, Bajura, Dadeldhura) to Kailali. This migration rapidly transformed Dhangadhi into a multi-ethnic urban center.

Dhangadhi was declared a municipality in 1976, and later upgraded to a Sub-Metropolitan City in 2015, the first in the Far-Western Region. It now serves as the headquarters of Kailali District and the economic hub of Sudurpashchim Province. The Seti Zone headquarters was located here before Nepal’s federal restructuring (2015). Dhangadhi hosts key institutions such as Dhangadhi Airport, Province Headquarter, and many regional government offices.

The name “Dhangadhi” likely derives from “Dhang” (a Tharu word for a raised land or platform) and “Gadhi” (fort) — meaning “fortified elevated area.” It’s one of Nepal’s oldest border towns, closely linked with the Indian city of Gauriphanta (Uttar Pradesh). The city lies about 10 km north of the Nepal–India border and about 660 km west of Kathmandu.

The city is rapidly urbanizing with growing trade, education, and transportation networks.

== Economy ==
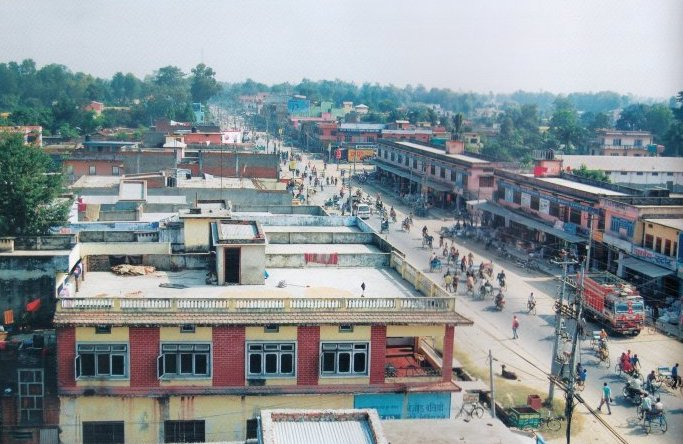
Dhangadhi

Dhangadhi serves as the primary commercial and industrial hub for Sudurpashchim Province and one of the fastest developing cities of Nepal. It got its first democratically elected mayor who was affiliated with the Nepali Congress Kishor Kumar Bam (1964-2014) who held his office for full term. The current mayor of Dhangadhi is Gopal Hamal, who has done a revolutionary infrastructural development in the city. For years, this sub-metropolitan city was defined by its dust, narrow lanes, and the chaotic sprawl typical of a rapidly growing border town. However, since Gopal Hamal, a businessman turned independent politician, took office in May 2022, the city has entered a period of aggressive, often controversial, transformation.

The "Hamal Era" is characterized by a departure from traditional party politics in favor of a "managerial" approach to urban governance. The most visible change is the literal widening of the city’s arteries. For decades, encroachment on the main roads was considered a political third rail; previous administrations feared losing votes by demolishing illegal structures.

Hamal took a different path. Under his leadership, the city deployed bulldozers to clear structures along the 30-meter-wide main road. While urban planners applaud the newfound "flow," many local business owners remain stung by the loss of property, sparking a tense debate between individual rights and collective urban progress.

Dhangadhi is no longer just concrete and dust. The "Green Dhangadhi, Clean Dhangadhi" initiative has seen thousands of tree saplings planted along medians and public spaces. Existing parks have been renovated, and new "pocket parks" are appearing in wards that previously lacked green space. There has been a visible push for better waste segregation, with the Mayor often taking to social media to personally shame littering or celebrate clean neighborhoods.

Beyond the physical infrastructure, the shift has moved into the classroom. The city has focused on upgrading community schools to rival private institution. Increased monitoring of teacher attendance and student performance, aiming to bridge the gap for families who cannot afford private tuition. The biggest change may not be physical, but political. As an independent, Hamal has bypassed traditional party patronage. He famously uses his own vehicle and refuses a state salary, donating it to social causes instead. This "clean" image has set a new, and for some established politicians, uncomfortable, standard for transparency in the region.

It is one of the major trading centers in Sudurpashchim Province. The city has health care facilities, a number of parks, private schools, colleges, and internet service providers. There are medical, engineering, and management colleges that are affiliated to Tribhuvan University and Far Western University.

The city attracts migrants from the surrounding area, who move to the city for educational and health services.

Dhangadhi is the gateway to nearby tourist places like Shuklaphanta National Park, Ghodaghodi Lake and Khaptad National Park. It is the connecting city between nearby cities of Mahendranagar, Dadeldhura, and Patan. It is also a land route to enter Nepal from India. Thus, it is also involved in the hospitality sector.

The city has many commercial banks such as regional office of Nepal Rastra Bank, Agricultural Development Bank, Everest Bank, Nabil Bank, Bank of Kathmandu, Nepal Credit and Commerce Bank, Siddharth Bank, Machhapuchhre Bank, and Kumari Bank.

A number of haat bazaars are held each week in different parts of the town, where farmers from the city outer set up stalls to sell agricultural products, spices, and handicrafts. Every year, the Kailali Chamber of Commerce and Industry organizes Sudurpaschim Mahotsav in Dhangadhi on the month of Mangsir.

Dhangadhi's economy is predominantly based on agriculture, trade, and hospitality. The fertile plains surrounding the city make it an ideal location for cultivating crops such as rice, wheat, sugarcane, maize, and vegetables. The region's agricultural produce not only serves the local market but also contributes to the national supply chain. Additionally, Dhangadhi's proximity to the Indian border facilitates cross-border trade, making it a significant trading hub for goods and commodities. In recent years, the city has witnessed the establishment of small-scale industries and businesses. These include manufacturing units, food processing plants, and trading enterprises, contributing to economic growth and employment opportunities.

== Climate ==
Dhangadhi is located in the Terai. It has a monsoon-influenced humid subtropical climate (Cwa according to the Köppen climate classification).The months of March and April are hot and dry. It is a cold winter from December to February. It is affected by the south-west monsoon from June to September which brings heavy rainfall. The weather in this period remains hot and humid. The highest temperature ever recorded in Dhangadhi was 46.4 °C (115.5 °F) on 16 June 1995, which is the highest temperature to have ever been recorded in Nepal. The lowest temperature ever recorded was 0.0 °C (32.0 °F) on 11 January 1985.

Climate data for Dhangadhi (1991–2020 normals, extremes 1975–2017)
Month	Jan	Feb	Mar	Apr	May	Jun	Jul	Aug	Sep	Oct	Nov	Dec	Year
Record high °C (°F)	28.4 (83.1)	36.4 (97.5)	40.2 (104.4)	43.0 (109.4)	43.5 (110.3)	46.4 (115.5)	41.5 (106.7)	38.5 (101.3)	37.2 (99.0)	38.4 (101.1)	34.2 (93.6)	29.6 (85.3)	46.4 (115.5)
Mean daily maximum °C (°F)	19.9 (67.8)	24.9 (76.8)	30.6 (87.1)	36.2 (97.2)	37.6 (99.7)	36.3 (97.3)	33.2 (91.8)	32.9 (91.2)	32.7 (90.9)	31.8 (89.2)	27.9 (82.2)	23.0 (73.4)	30.6 (87.1)
Daily mean °C (°F)	13.7 (56.7)	17.4 (63.3)	22.0 (71.6)	27.2 (81.0)	30.2 (86.4)	30.9 (87.6)	29.5 (85.1)	29.3 (84.7)	28.5 (83.3)	25.4 (77.7)	20.4 (68.7)	15.8 (60.4)	24.2 (75.6)
Mean daily minimum °C (°F)	7.4 (45.3)	9.8 (49.6)	13.4 (56.1)	18.1 (64.6)	22.7 (72.9)	25.4 (77.7)	25.8 (78.4)	25.6 (78.1)	24.2 (75.6)	19.0 (66.2)	12.9 (55.2)	8.5 (47.3)	17.7 (63.9)
Record low °C (°F)	0.0 (32.0)	0.9 (33.6)	5.2 (41.4)	9.0 (48.2)	13.5 (56.3)	18.0 (64.4)	21.0 (69.8)	19.8 (67.6)	18.0 (64.4)	10.8 (51.4)	4.2 (39.6)	0.4 (32.7)	0.0 (32.0)
Average precipitation mm (inches)	27.9 (1.10)	30.4 (1.20)	20.7 (0.81)	20.2 (0.80)	69.3 (2.73)	251.5 (9.90)	531.5 (20.93)	534.2 (21.03)	300.8 (11.84)	49.9 (1.96)	2.9 (0.11)	12.0 (0.47)	1,851.3 (72.89)
Average precipitation days (≥ 1.0 mm)	2.6	2.9	2.1	2.3	5.3	11.4	19.3	18.8	11.3	1.8	0.6	0.8	79.0
Source 1: World Meteorological Organization
Source 2: Department of Hydrology and Meteorology

== Demographics ==
language in Dhangadhi
1. Tharu (36.0%)
2. Doteli (31.0%)
3. Nepali (22.0%)
4. Hindi (2.00%)
5. Maithili (2.00%)
6. Magar (1.00%)
7. Others (6.00%)
Ethnic groups in Dhangadhi
1. Tharu 37 (36.3%)
2. Hill Brahman 17 (16.7%)
3. Chhetri 21 (20.6%)
4. Thakuri 6 (5.88%)
5. Kami 6 (5.88%)
6. Magar 3 (2.94%)
7. others 12 (11.8%)

At the time of the 2011 Nepal census, Dhangadhi Submetropolitan City had a population of 149,818. Of these, 36.4% spoke Tharu, 31.3% Doteli, 22.1% Nepali, 1.7% Hindi, 1.6% Maithili, 1.4% Magar, 1.1% Baitadeli, 0.8% Achhami, 0.7% Tamang, 0.5% Baitadeli, 0.4% Bajureli, 0.4% Newar, 0.4% Urdu, 0.2% Bhojpuri, 0.2% Kham, 0.1% Dadeldhuri, 0.1% Darchuleli, 0.1% Gurung, 0.1% Rai, 0.1% Rajasthani and 0.1% other languages as their first language.

In terms of ethnicity/caste, 36.8% were Tharu, 20.5% Chhetri, 17.4% Hill Brahmin, 6.1% Thakuri, 5.7% Kami, 2.6% Magar, 1.6% Damai/Dholi, 1.5% Musalman, 1.2% Sarki, 1.1% Newar, 0.9% Tamang, 0.5% Terai Brahmin, 0.5% other Dalit, 0.5% Sanyasi/Dasnami, 0.4% Kathabaniyan, 0.3% Gurung, 0.2% Halwai, 0.2% Lohar, 0.2% Marwadi, 0.2% Rai, 0.2% other Terai, 0.1% Badi, 0.1% Dhanuk, 0.1% Hajam/Thakur, 0.1% Kalwar, 0.1% Kayastha, 0.1% Kurmi, 0.1% Limbu, 0.1% Musahar, 0.1% Teli, 0.1% Yadav and 0.1% others.

Religion in Dhangadhi (2011)
Religion	Percent
Hinduism	94%
Christianity	2%
Buddhism	2%
Others	2%

In terms of religion, 93.9% were Hindu, 1.8% Christian, 1.7% Buddhist, 1.5% Muslim and 1.0% Prakriti.

In terms of literacy, 75.2% could read and write, 2.1% could only read and 22.6% could neither read nor write.

== Transportation ==
=== Road ===
Dhangadhi is well connected with other major cities of Nepal and the Indian state of Uttar Pradesh. Indian and Nepali nationals may cross the international border without restrictions, however there is a customs checkpoint for goods and third country nationals. Frequent bus services operate between Dhangadhi and Nepalese cities. Local transport includes Cycle Rickshaws, Taxis and Public City Buses.Mahakali Highway connects Dhangadhi to different parts of Far western Nepal. The country's longest highway, Mahendra Highway, runs through the town of Attariya, 15 kilometers from Dhangadhi.

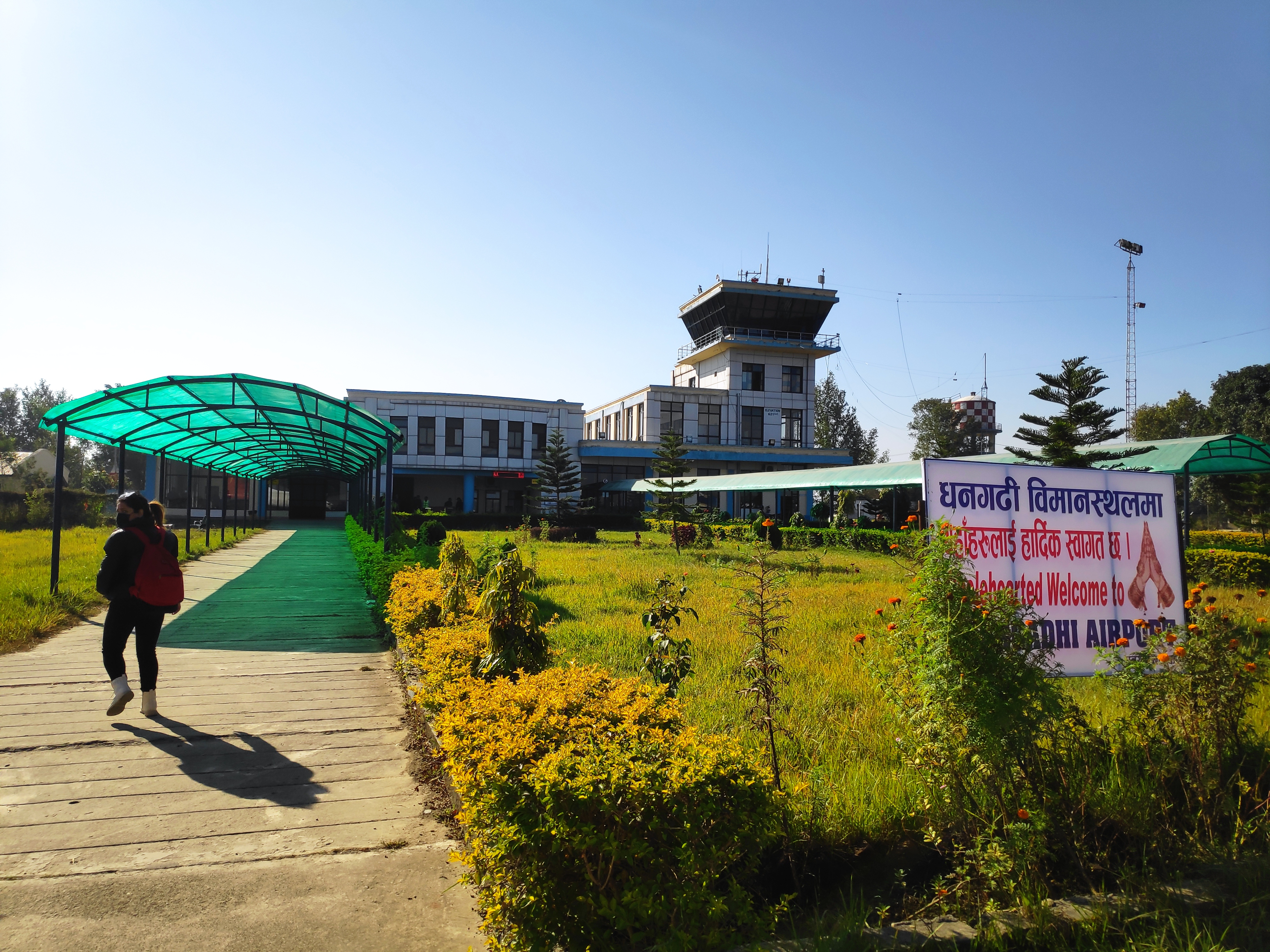
Dhangadhi Airport

=== Air ===
Dhangadhi Airport is located 8 km from the administrative center and about 660 kilometers west of Kathmandu. The runway has been extended to 1,524 metres (5,000 ft) length and blacktopped to accommodate Fokker 100 aircraft. It operated flights to Kathmandu, Pokhara, Bajura, Dipayal Silgadhi, Bajhang, Surkhet, Achham. The normal cost for Nepali National is around 60$ (one way) and 100$ for foreigners. This discrepancy in price for foreigners has led to lack of international tourist activities. As the Bus journey is extremely difficult, 18-24 hours, depending on the road condition.

== Education ==
Dhangadhi has several schools and colleges. Kailali Multiple Campus is the oldest higher level institution in Kailali District. Some of the well known higher secondary institution in Dhangadhi are NAST, SPA, AVN, and Stepping Stone.

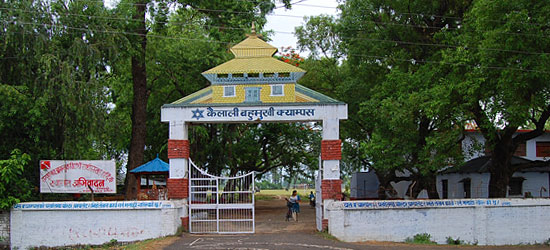
Kailali Multiple Campus

== Health ==
=== Hospital ===
- Seti Provincial Hospital
- Navajeevan Hospital
- CP Hospital
- Maya Metro Hospital
- Nisarga Hospital
- Dhangadhi Netralaya Eye Hospital
- NOVA Hospital

== Places of interest ==
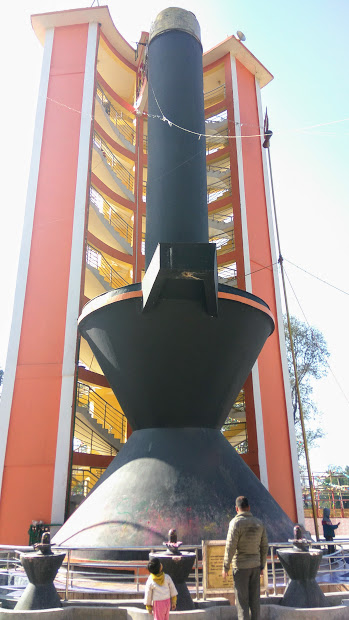
Shivapuri Dham Temple

- Shivapuri Dham Temple
- Behada Baba Temple
- Tikapur Park, two hours' drive east
- Shuklaphanta National Park, an hour's drive west
- Karnali River, two hours east from Dhangadhi
- Godawari, north of Dhangadhi
- Rajkada
- Khanidada
- Hatkholi
- Jakhera Taal

== Notable people ==
- Lokesh Bam, cricketer
- Biraj Bhatta, actor
- Deepak Bist, Sportsperson
- Gopal Hamal, politician, social worker and current mayor
- Ramlal Joshi, writer
- Bhuvan Karki, cricketer
- Pashupati Paneru, former badminton player who represented Nepal in the 2006 IBF World Championships
- Deepika Prasain, actress
- Raju Rijal, cricketer, former captain of Nepal national under-19 cricket team

== Sports ==
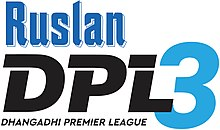
Logo of DPL

The city has its own cricket league, Dhangadhi Premier League. Dhangadhi Rangsala with a capacity of 10,000+ spectators is the football stadium in the city. The Khaptad Gold Cup is held in the stadium. DPL is held on Fapla International Cricket Ground. Sudrupaschim Royal is the franchise team based on Dhangadhi which plays in Nepal Premier League. Chris Lynn has played for the Royals.

== Media ==
The city has several radio stations:

- Dinesh FM 93.8 MHz
- Dhangadhi FM 90.5 MHz
- Paschim Today 98.8 MHz
- Radio Sudur Sandesh 104 MHz
- Khaptad FM 98.2 MHz
- Radio Daily Mail 94.6 MHz
- Radio Active FM 97.2 MHz

== See also ==
- 2022 Dhangadhi municipal election
- Mahendranagar
- Patan Baitadi
- Dadeldhura
