= Pahari people (Nepal) =

Ethnic group in Nepal

Pahari
पहाडी

Regions with significant populations
- Majority in: Nepal (11,484,000); significant minority in: Bhutan; India; Myanmar

Languages
- Eastern Pahari languages

Religion
- Majority: Hinduism (91.17%); significant minority: Buddhism · Christianity

Related ethnic groups
- Garhwali; Kumaoni; Nepalese

The Pahadi people (Nepali: पहाडी; alternate spelling Pahari; also known as Parbatiya or Parbate) (Note: Nepali: पर्वतीय, romanized: Parbatīya, pronounced [/pər.bəˈtiː.jə/]; Nepali: पर्बते, romanized: Parbate, pronounced [/pər.bəˈte/]) are an Indo-Aryan ethnolinguistic group native to the Pahad region of Nepal. The term derives from the Nepali word pahad (पहाड), meaning "hill" or "mountain." Historically, the terms Pahadi, Parbatiya, and Parbate referred specifically to the Khas people of Nepal, distinguishing them from the Tibeto-Burman ethnic groups, collectively known as the Janajati people of the same hill and mountain regions. However, in modern everyday use, the term is also used geographically to refer to anyone from Nepal's hill and mountain region, regardless of their ethnic background. The Pahadi people of Nepal speak the Eastern Pahari languages.

== History ==
The Paharis are historically ancient, having been mentioned by the authors Pliny and Herodotus and figuring in India's epic poem, the Mahābhārata. References to Brahmins and Kshatriyas are found in Banawali (Tantric texts) on Nepal, in whose ancient setting Kathmandu was still a lake. Pahadi Brahmins, Kshatriyas, are of Indo-Aryan heritage.

Before Nepal was united as a nation under the Shah dynasty (1768–2008), smaller kingdoms in the region were ruled by kings of various ethnic and caste groups. The ancient name of this Himalayan region was Khas Desh. Most populous among the people of this mid-mountainous area were the Khas people, also mentioned in the histories of India and China. The Khas people, indigenous Indo-Aryan mountain dwellers, spread to dominate the hills of Central Himalaya and played important role in the history of the region, establishing many independent dynasties in early medieval times. The Khas people had an empire, the Kaśa Kingdom, whose territory extended to Kashmir, part of Tibet, and Western Nepal (Karnali Zone).

In the early modern history of Nepal, Pahari Chhetris played a key role in the unification of Nepal, providing the backbone of the Gorkha army of the mid-18th century. During the monarchy, Chhetris and Bahuns continued to dominate the ranks of the Nepalese Army, Nepalese government administration, and even some regiments of the Indian Army. Under the pre-democratic constitution and institutions of the state, Chhetri culture and language also dominated multiethnic Nepal to the disadvantage and exclusion of many Nepalese minorities and Tibetan peoples. The desire for increased self-determination among these minorities and Tibetan Janajati peoples was one of the central issues in the Nepalese Civil War and subsequent democratic movement.

During the Shah Dynasty, the Paharis began to settle the Terai region. Politically, socially, and economically dominant over the Tharu under the conservative system of the monarchy, the Pahari community in the Terai purchased, or otherwise got hold of large landholdings. Together with traditional Tharu landlords, they constitute the upper level of the economic hierarchy, which in the rural parts of the Terai is determined to a large extent by the distribution and the value of agriculturally productive land. The poor are the landless, or near landless, Terai Dalits, including the Musahar and Chamar, as well as the traditional fishermen, the Mallaah, and some of the hill Dalits. In particular, the Musahars rarely get other work than hard farm labour. During and after the Nepalese Civil War, Paharis faced a violent backlash by the marginalized Madhesi community, including ransoming, murder, and land dispossession by armed Maoist groups such as the Janatantrik Terai Mukti Morcha (JTMM) seeking Madhesi independence.

== Languages ==
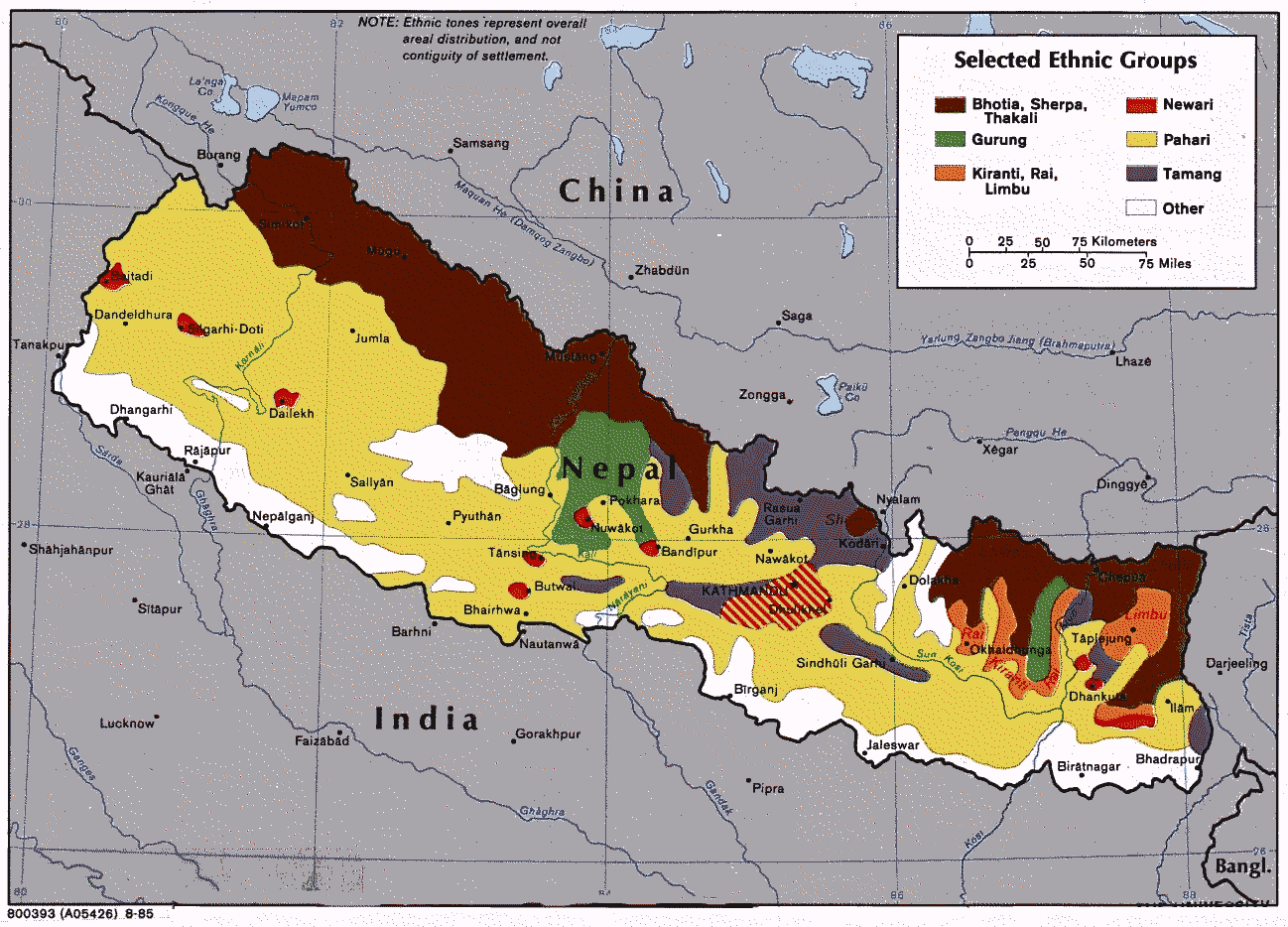
Geographic distribution of the Khas (Pahari) people in Nepal

The Pahari people speak Indo-Aryan languages, such as Nepali.

== Religion and castes ==
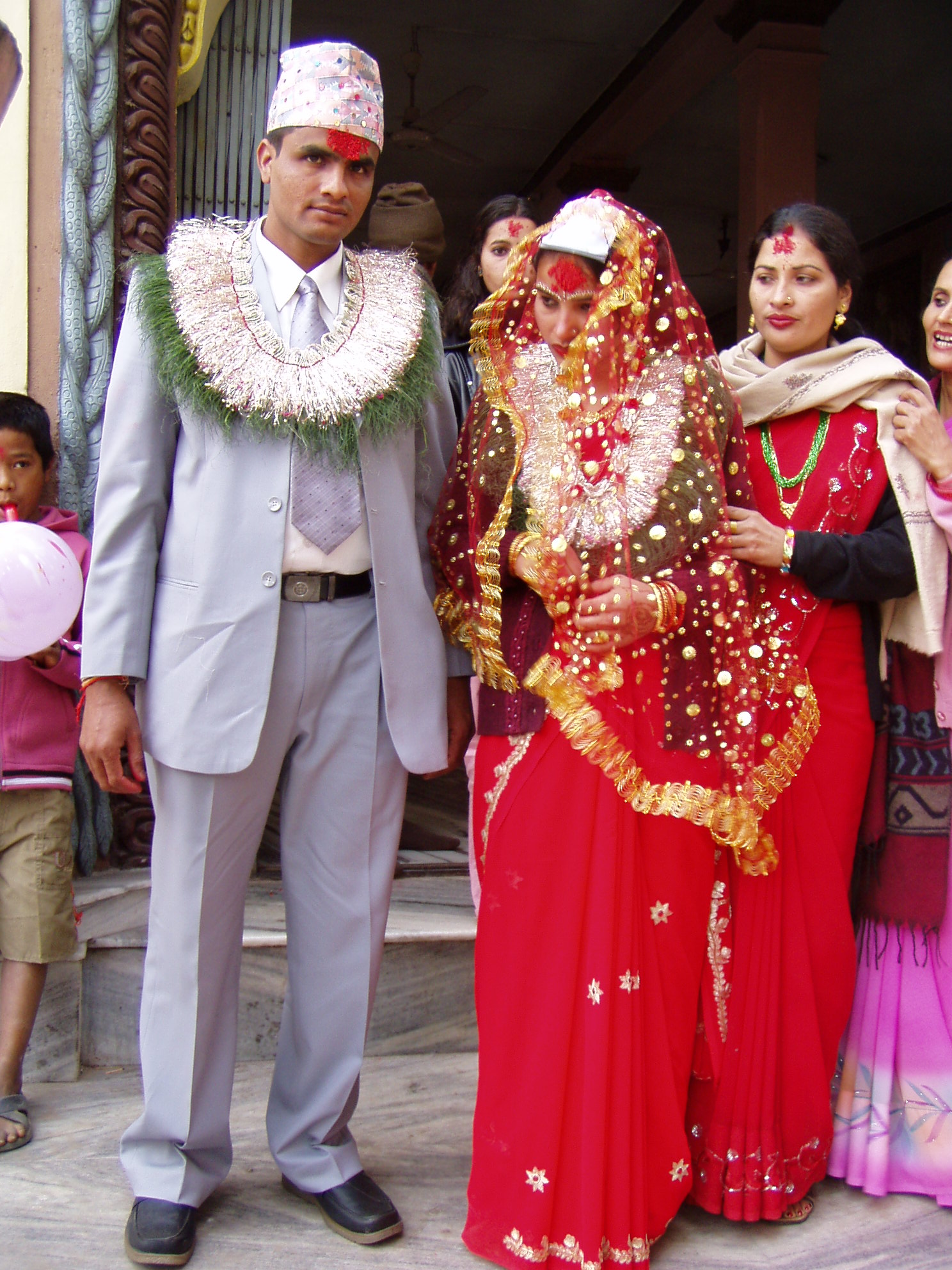
Nepali Khas Parbatiya peoples at Narayangarh, Chitwan

Most Nepalese Paharis are Hindus, with the exception of the shamanistic and oracular Matwali ("drinking") Khasa Chhetris. Hindu Paharis are generally more conscious of their caste (Varna, Jāti) and status than their Tibetan neighbors, especially those Paharis living in rural Nepal. However, as a result of extensive historical contact with non-Hindu Nepalese, the Pahari caste structure is less orthodox and less complex than the traditional four-fold system in the plains to the south.

Chhetris as a caste comprise many subgroups, including Khas (clans from Khas) and Thakuri (aristocratic clans). The Khas subgroups are aboriginal of Karnali Zone.

== Society ==
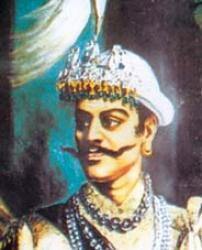
King of Nepal, Rana Bahadur Shah belonged to Pahari community

The most prominent features of Nepalese Pahari society have been the Chhetri Shah dynasty (1768–2008), the Rana Prime Ministers that marginalized the monarchy (1846–1953), and its upper-caste presence in the armed forces, police, and government of Nepal. The King of Nepal himself was a member of the Chhetri Thakuri sub-caste. In traditional and administrative professions, upper-caste Paharis were given favourable treatment by the royal government.

Historically, Hindu Paharis have practiced a spectrum of marital customs including monogamy, polygamy (both polyandry and polygyny), and group marriage. Girls under the age of 10 may be betrothed, though they cohabit with their husbands only when they reach maturity. Wives must be faithful to their husbands while with them; however, when wives visit their parents, they may behave as if unmarried. Most upper-caste Paharis do not practice cross-cousin marriage, however the aristocratic Thakuri sub-caste allows marriage of maternal cross-cousins. Among all Paharis, remarriage by widows is formally prohibited by social norms; however, an institution called "Jari" (related to the Sanskrit word "Jarah" meaning debauchery or paramour) exists. In this practice among Pahari hill dwellers, a woman will take a paramour, leaving her first husband. The second husband must pay the first husband "Jar dine" for the loss of his wife.

Among Pahari families, death is treated by both burial and cremation. Low status individuals, such as children and some women, are buried. Also, indigenous healers known as Jhankri are buried with their fontanelle pierced to allow their spirit to rise to the spirit world. Others, high-caste and wealthy, are cremated per classic Hindu tradition.

== Lifestyle ==
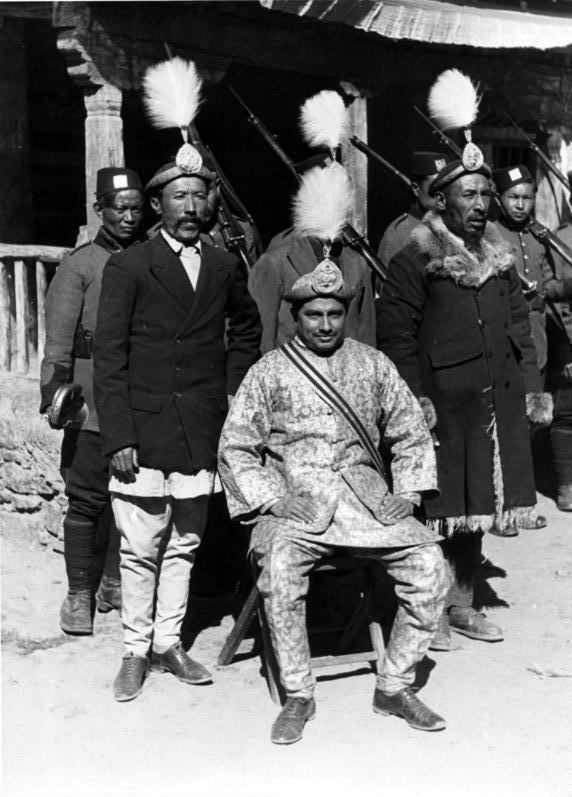
Major Hiranya Bista (seated) with Tibetan guards, a Pahari civil servant of Chhetri sub-caste.

The Paharis, like the Madhesis, are not an agricultural people, although a majority also rely on other activities for supplementary income. Cultivating terraces on the hillsides, their chief crops are potatoes and rice. Other crops include wheat, barley, onions, tomatoes, tobacco, and other vegetables. Pahari farmers raise water buffalo, sheep, goats, and cattle.

Paharis, namely Chhetri and its Thakuri sub-caste, held a virtual monopoly on government and military offices throughout the Shah Dynasty (1768–2008).

== See also ==
- Northern Indo-Aryan languages
- Pahari culture
- Ethnic groups in Nepal
- Demographics of Nepal
