= Miss Grand Nepal 2022 =

Beauty pageant edition

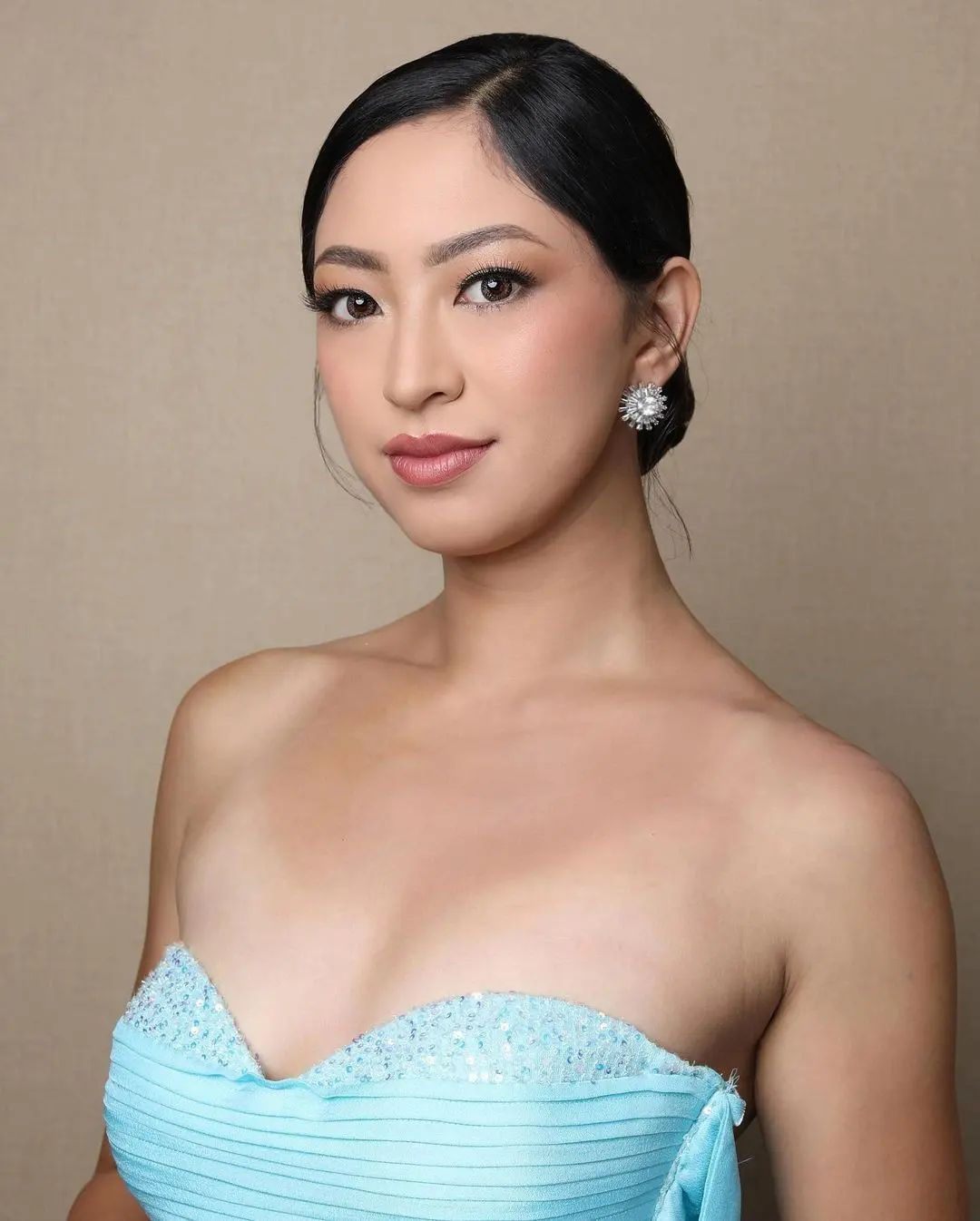
- Aishworya Shrestha, Miss Grand Nepal 2022
- Date: 10 September 2022
- Presenters: Urusha Joshi
- Venue: Hotel Shanker, Kathmandu
- Entrants: 14
- Winner: Aishworya Shrestha; Kathmandu
- Congeniality: Sudeshna Maharjan (Nepal) Lalitpur
- Best in swimsuit: Barsha Bhandari (Nepal) Dhading
- Best Personality: Barsha Bhandari (Nepal) Dhading

Miss Grand Nepal 2022 was the fourth edition of Miss Grand Nepal beauty pageant, co-organized by Izodom Nepal, Cosmo Group, and Bolly Club Group, held on 10 September 2022 at Hotel Shanker in Kathmandu. Fourteen national candidates, directly chosen by the central organizer through an online application and the audition round, competed for the title, of whom, Aishworya Shrestha from Bagmati Province was named the winner and then represented the country at Miss Grand International 2022 held on October 25, in Indonesia, but she got a non-placement.

In addition to the event organized by the Izodom Nepal group, another pageant with the same title, held in August 2022 by a former Miss Grand Nepal licensee, RK Entertainment Group, has been observed. However, the mentioned organizer has not been affiliated with the Miss Grand International pageant since 2019 due to license termination, and the winner and runners-up of that pageant are usually participating in other different international contests such as Miss Tourism International, Miss Scuba International, Miss Landscape International, and Miss Multinational.

== Background ==
Since acquiring the Miss Grand Nepal franchise in 2019, the Izodom Nepal & Cosmo Group only held the contest once in 2020, due to the COVID-19 pandemic, the country's representative on the international stage Miss Grand International was instead appointed in 2021. However, after the outbreak has been effectively controlled, the organizer then decided to arrange the national contest in 2022 to elect the representative for the international pageant in Indonesia. The press conference of such was held on 25 August in Kathmandu, and the final venue and the competition detail were also revealed in the event. The contestant application was open from 3 July – 10 August with the audition round on 27 August and the final coronation round on 10 September 2022 at Hotel Shanker, also in the capital Kathmandu.

List of Miss Grand Nepal 2022 audition round judges:

- Aanchal Sharma, model and actress
- Anup Bikram Shahi, model
- Ashish Rana, rapper and singer
- Chhiring Wangdi, social activist
- Nishu Jha, Pageant Director/ General Secretary- Beauty Pageant Association of Nepal
- Suresh Tamang, Miss Grand Nepal national director

== Pageant ==
In the grand final competition held on September 10, the results of all preliminary activities as well as the individual interview determined the 10 semifinalists. The top 10 delivered a speech related to the pageant campaign, Stop wars and violence, and were narrowed down to the top 5, who then competed in the question/answer portion, After which Miss Grand Nepal 2022, and her three runners-up, were announced.

List of Miss Grand Nepal 2022 final round judges:

- Anup Bikram Shahi, model
- Ashish Rana, rapper and singer
- Priya Sigdel, Miss Earth Nepal 2018
- Chhiring Wangdi, social activist
- Nishu Jha, Pageant Director/ General Secretary- Beauty Pageant Association of Nepal
- Suresh Tamang, Miss Grand Nepal national director

The summary of the selecting process is presented below.

Miss Grand Nepal 2022 selection process

		Custom selection 9 contestants
Initial Pool; 14 contestants	Swimsuit round	Top 10	Evening gown and Speech rounds	Finals; 5 contestants	Question and answer round	Winner; Announcement
		Popular vote 1 contestant

== Results summary ==
Color keys

- The contestant Won in an International pageant.
- The contestant was a Runner-up in an International pageant.
- The contestant was a Semi-Finalist in an International pageant.
- The contestant assumed another title.
- The contestant was not able to compete in an International pageant.
- The contestant did not place but won a Special Award in the pageant.
- The contestant did not place.

Final results	Contestant	International pageant	International Results
Miss Grand Nepal 2022	Kathmandu - Aishworya Shrestha	Miss Grand International 2022	Unplaced
1st runner-up	(Nepal) Dhading - Barsha Bhandari		
2nd runner-up	Kathmandu - Rakchya Upreti	Miss Eco International 2023	Top 21
Top 5	Kathmandu – Smarika Upreti		
Top 5	Montreal, Canada – Samana Karki		
Top 10	Kathmandu – Aanchal Khadka		
Top 10	Kathmandu – Fibika Chaulagain		
Top 10	Kathmandu – Kanchan Shrestha		
Top 10	(Nepal) Lalitpur – Sudeshna Maharjan		
Top 10	(Nepal) Lumbini – Tanu Shakya (●)		

(●): Winner of the Miss Popular Vote goes directly into the Top 10 semifinalists.

=== Sub-Titles ===
Award	Contestant
Best in Swimsuit	(Nepal) Dhading - Barsha Bhandari
Best Personality	(Nepal) Dhading - Barsha Bhandari
Miss Confidence	Montreal, Canada - Samana Karki
Miss Photogenic	(Nepal) Dolakha - Swostika Magar
Miss Congeniality	(Nepal) Lalitpur - Sudeshna Maharjan
Miss Popular Vote	(Nepal) Lumbini - Tanu Shakya

== Candidates ==
The following 14 candidates competed for the Miss Grand Nepal 2022 title.

Candidate	Hometown	Age	Placement
Fibika Chaulagain	Kathmandu	19	Top 10
Kanchan Shrestha	Kathmandu	21	Top 10
Isha Khanal	(Nepal) Bhaktapur	20	
Swostika Magar	(Nepal) Dolakha	20	
Tanu Shakya	(Nepal) Lumbini	18	Top 10
Aishworya Shrestha	Kathmandu	25	Miss Grand Nepal 2022
Barsha Bhandari	(Nepal) Dhading	22	1st runner-up
Rakchya Upreti	Kathmandu	25	2nd runner-up
Aanchal Khadka	Kathmandu	24	Top 10
Anujha Basnet	(Nepal) Sunsari	19	
Sudeshna Maharjan	(Nepal) Lalitpur	23	Top 10
Samana Karki	Montreal, Canada	18	Top 5
Semikla Hang Sherma	(Nepal) Jhapa	18	
Smarika Upreti	Kathmandu	18	Top 5
