= Kailali Multiple Campus =

Campus in Nepal

- कैलाली बहुमुखी क्याम्पस
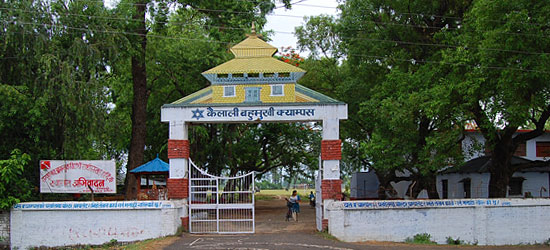
- Main gate of the campus
- Established: 1980
- Parent institution: Far Western University
- Students: 9000
- Location: Kailali
- Website: kailalicampus.edu.np

Kailali Multiple Campus (Nepali: कैलाली बहुमुखी क्याम्पस) is one of the constituent campuses of Far-western University located in Dhangadi of western Nepal. The campus was established in 1980 as a constituent campuses of Tribhuvan University, however the affiliation was changed in 2021 based on government decision. The campus is recognized by University Grants Commission since 2075 BS (2018–2019).

== History and Development ==
Before 2037 BS (1980 AD), there was no institution of higher education in the Kailali district. The absence of educational opportunities after the School Leaving Certificate (SLC) examination created an urgent social demand for a local campus. As a result, the local community initiated the establishment of Kailali Multiple Campus (KMC) in 2037 BS.

Prior to the campus's foundation, most students from the region had to travel to Kathmandu or India for higher studies. Since its establishment, KMC has grown to become one of the largest community-based campuses in Nepal, with more than 9,000 students.

The campus is situated in the eastern part of Dhangadhi Sub-Metropolitan City. KMC operates as an autonomous, community-based, and non-profit institution, with the aim of providing higher education to educationally underserved areas.

Affiliated with Tribhuvan University until 2021, KMC became a constituent campus of Far-western University following a government decision. Over the past decades, the campus has produced thousands of graduates working in various sectors both within Nepal and internationally.

In 2015, the University Grants Commission (UGC) of Nepal awarded KMC the Quality Assurance and Accreditation (QAA) certificate in recognition of its academic standards. The same year, KMC was ranked number one by the UGC among 60 community campuses selected under the Higher Education Reform Project (HERP), supported by the World Bank.

== Academic Departments ==
Kailali Multiple Campus offers academic programs across four major departments:

=== Management Department ===
- Master of Business Administration in Entrepreneurship (MBA-E)
- Master of Business Studies (MBS) – 2-year semester-based program
- Bachelor of Business Studies (BBS) – 4-year annual program
- Bachelor of Business Management (BBM) – 4-year semester-based program
- Bachelor of Business Administration (BBA) – 4-year semester-based program

=== Humanities Department ===
- Master of Arts (MA) – offered in Nepali, Economics, Political Science, and Sociology
- Bachelor of Arts (BA) – offered in English, Nepali, Rural Development, Mass Communication, Sociology, Population, Geography, Political Science, and Mathematics
- Bachelor of Social Work (BSW)

=== Education Department ===
- Master of Education (M.Ed) – specializations include Educational Planning and Management (EPM), Curriculum, English, Health, and Nepali
- Bachelor of Education (B.Ed) – available as a 4-year or 1-year program, with specializations in Population, Health, Economics, Political Science, English, Nepali, and Mathematics

=== Science Department ===
- Bachelor of Science (B.Sc) – 4-year annual program with Physical and Biological science groups
