= Miss Grand Nepal 2020 =

4th Miss Grand Nepal competition, beauty pageant edition

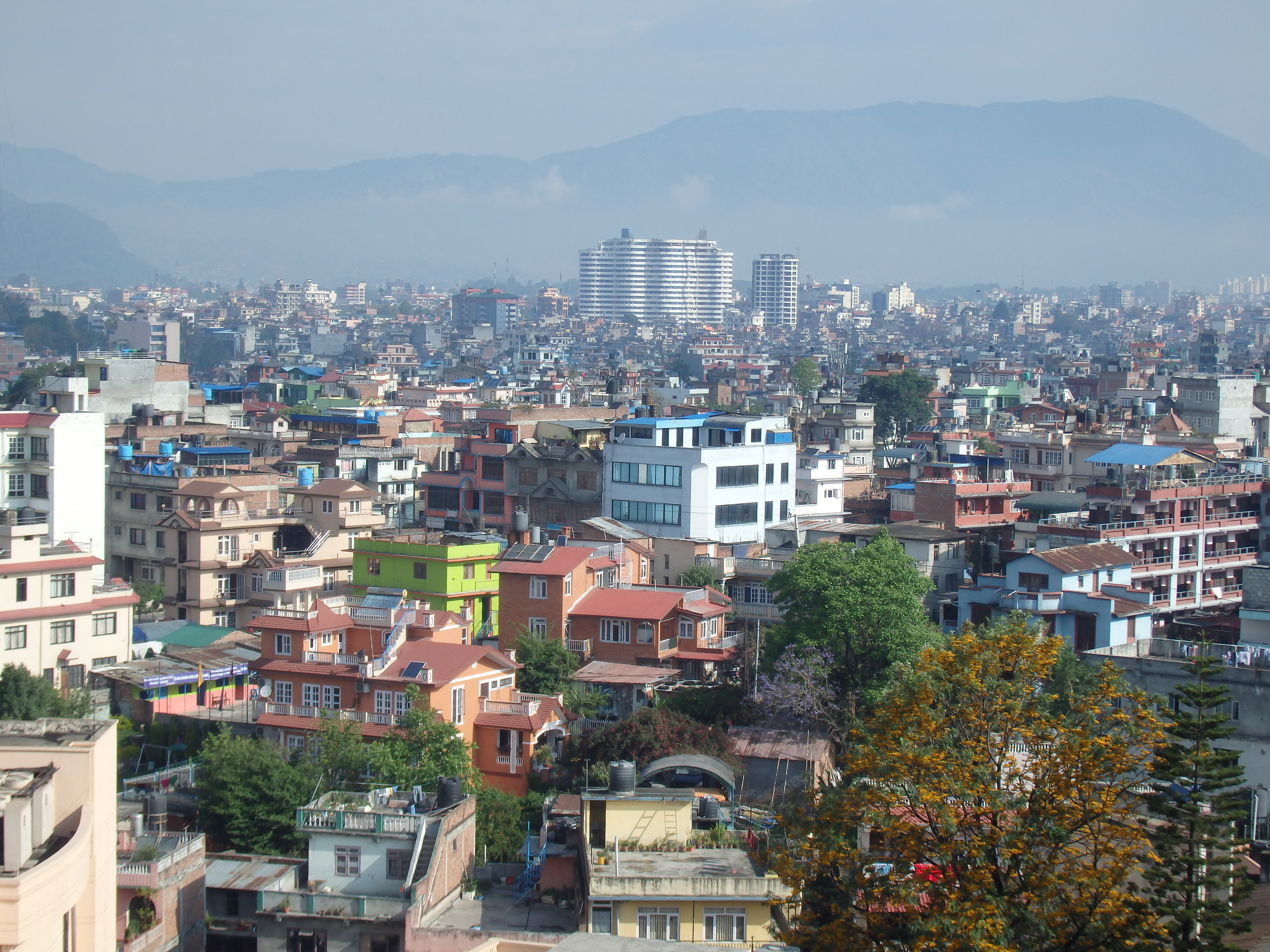
- Kathmandu, the host city of the contest
- Date: 13 December 2020
- Venue: Mojo Boutique Hotel, Baneshwor, Kathmandu
- Broadcaster: YouTube
- Entrants: 10
- Placements: 3
- Winner: Ambika Joshi Rana; Kathmandu
- Best National Costume: Aakriti Shrestha; Kathmandu
- Photogenic: Priti Parajuli (Nepal) Biratnagar

Miss Grand Nepal 2020 was the third edition of the Miss Grand Nepal beauty pageant, held on August 13, 2020, at the Mojo Boutique Hotel in Baneshwor, Kathmandu. Ten contestants competed for the title, of whom a 21-year-old medical student from Kathmandu, Ambika Joshi Rana, was named the winner and crowned by Miss Grand Nepal 2019, Nisha Pathak. She then represented Nepal on the parent stage, Miss Grand International 2020, held in Thailand on March 27, 2021, but she went unplaced.

The event was showcased under the direction of the Izodom Nepal & Cosmo Group in association with Kantipur Hospital Pvt. Ltd.

== Result ==
Final results	Contestant	International pageant	International Results
Miss Grand Nepal 2020 (Winner)	(Nepal) Pokhara - Ambika Joshi Rana	Miss Grand International 2020	Unplaced
1st runner-up	Kathmandu - Sujina Shahi		
2nd runner-up	(Nepal) Lamjung - Sujata Gurung		

=== Sub-Titles ===
Award	Contestant
Miss Photogenic	(Nepal) Biratnagar - Priti Parajuli
Miss Personality	Kathmandu - Palistha Shakya
Best in National Costume	Kathmandu - Aakriti Shrestha

== Contestants ==
No.	Contestants	Province	Placement
1	Aakriti Shrestha	Kathmandu	Best in National Costume
2	Ambika Joshi Rana	(Nepal) Pokhara	Miss Grand Nepal 2020
3	Jessica Shrestha	Kathmandu	
5	Nitu Sunar	Kathmandu	
6	Palistha Shakya	Kathmandu	Miss Personality
7	Priti Parajuli	(Nepal) Biratnagar	Miss Photogenic
8	Sujata Gurung	(Nepal) Lamjung	2nd runner-up
9	Sujina Shahi	Kathmandu	1st runner-up
10	Tenzin Dhadon Gurung	Kathmandu	
