= Tikapur Great Garden =

Tikapur Great Garden (Tikapur Park) is a tourist attraction in Tikapur, Nepal. It is located on the shore of the Karnali River and serves people with the variety of flowers and trees. The park has an area of 84 bigha. There is a boating facility on the river and a couple of beaches where people can swim or take a sun bath. In the past it is used to be a royal bungalow of late King Birendra.

== Gallery ==
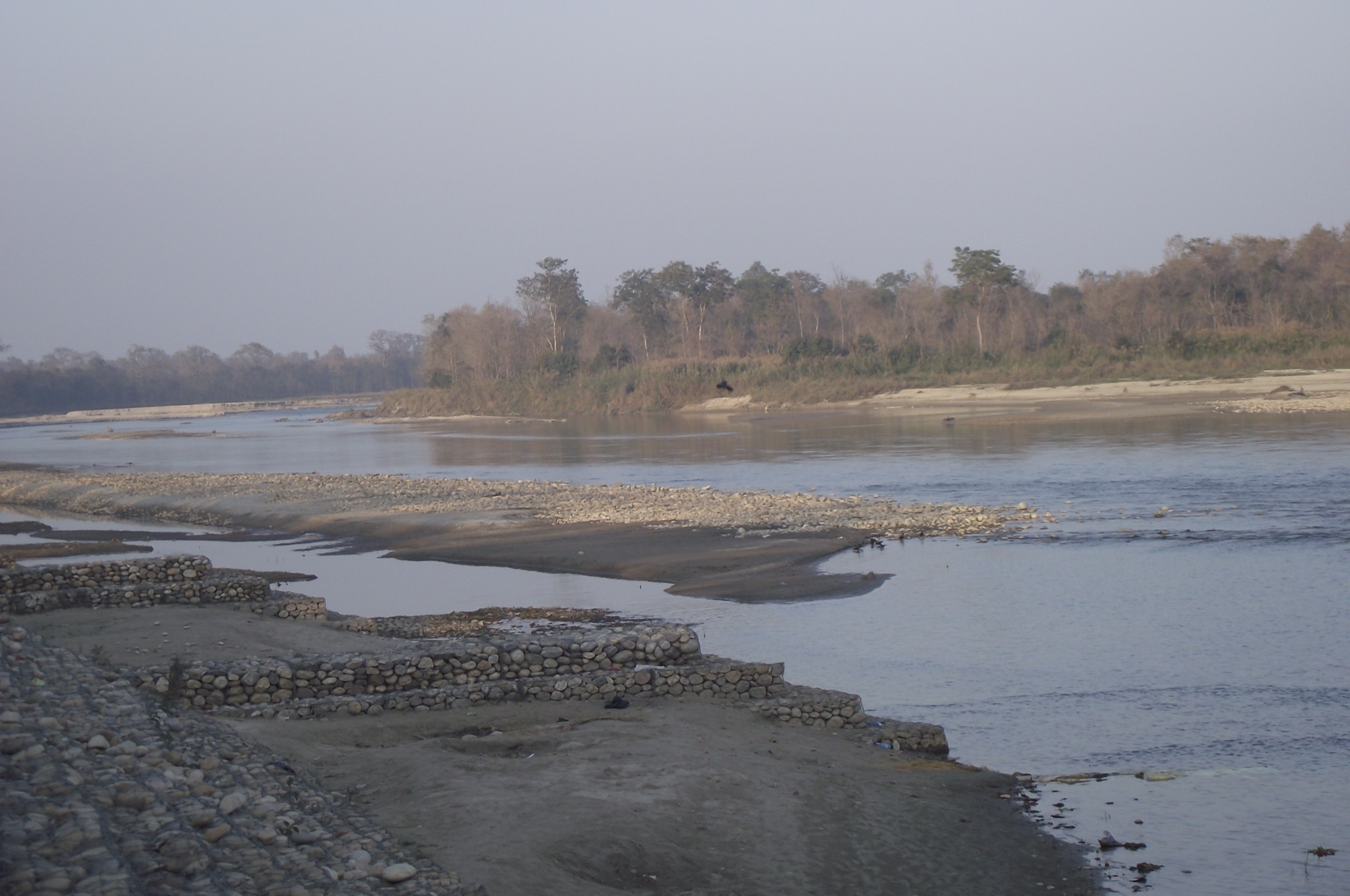
tikapur beach

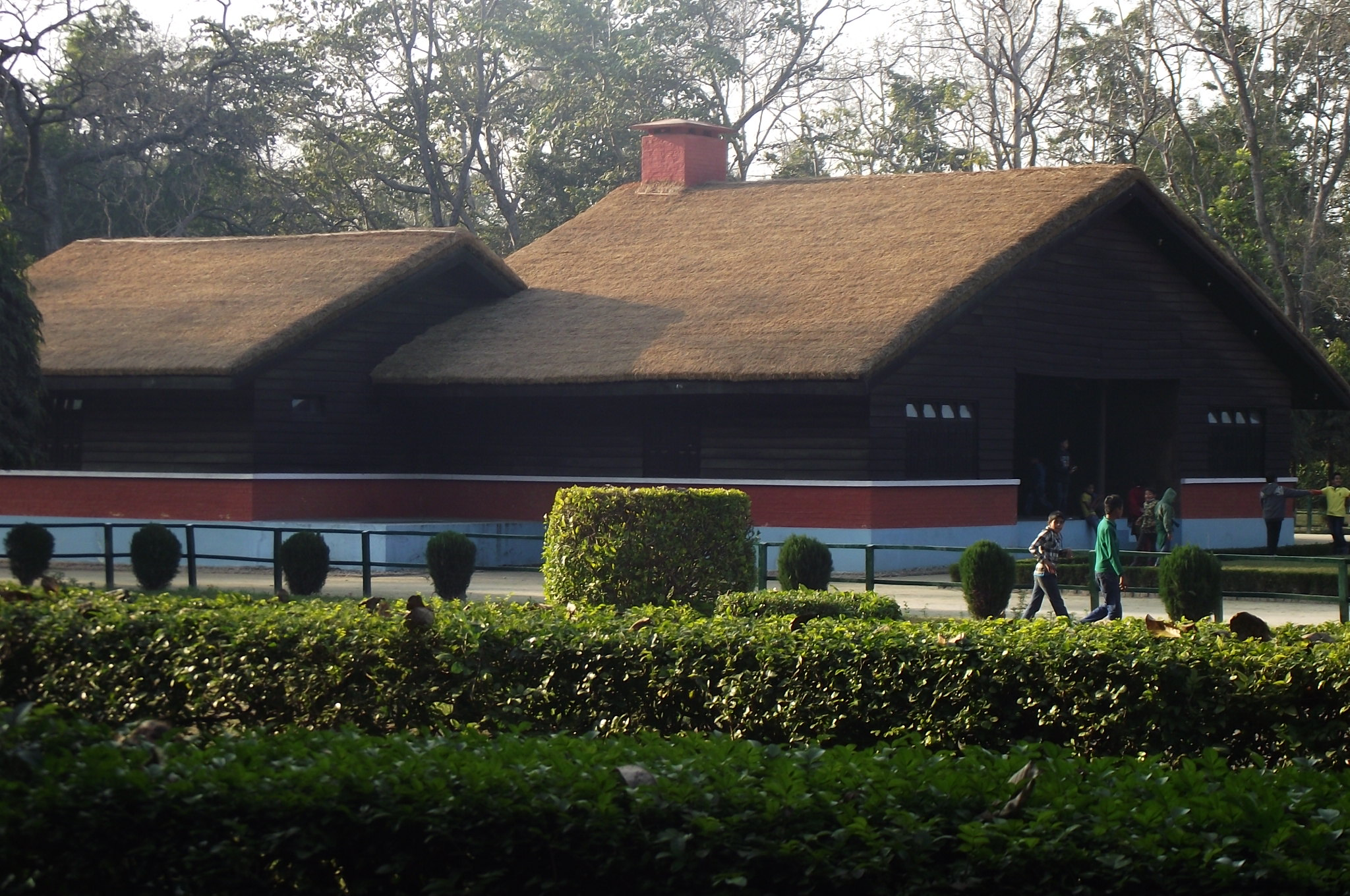
Back view of Mahendra Griha at Tikapur Park

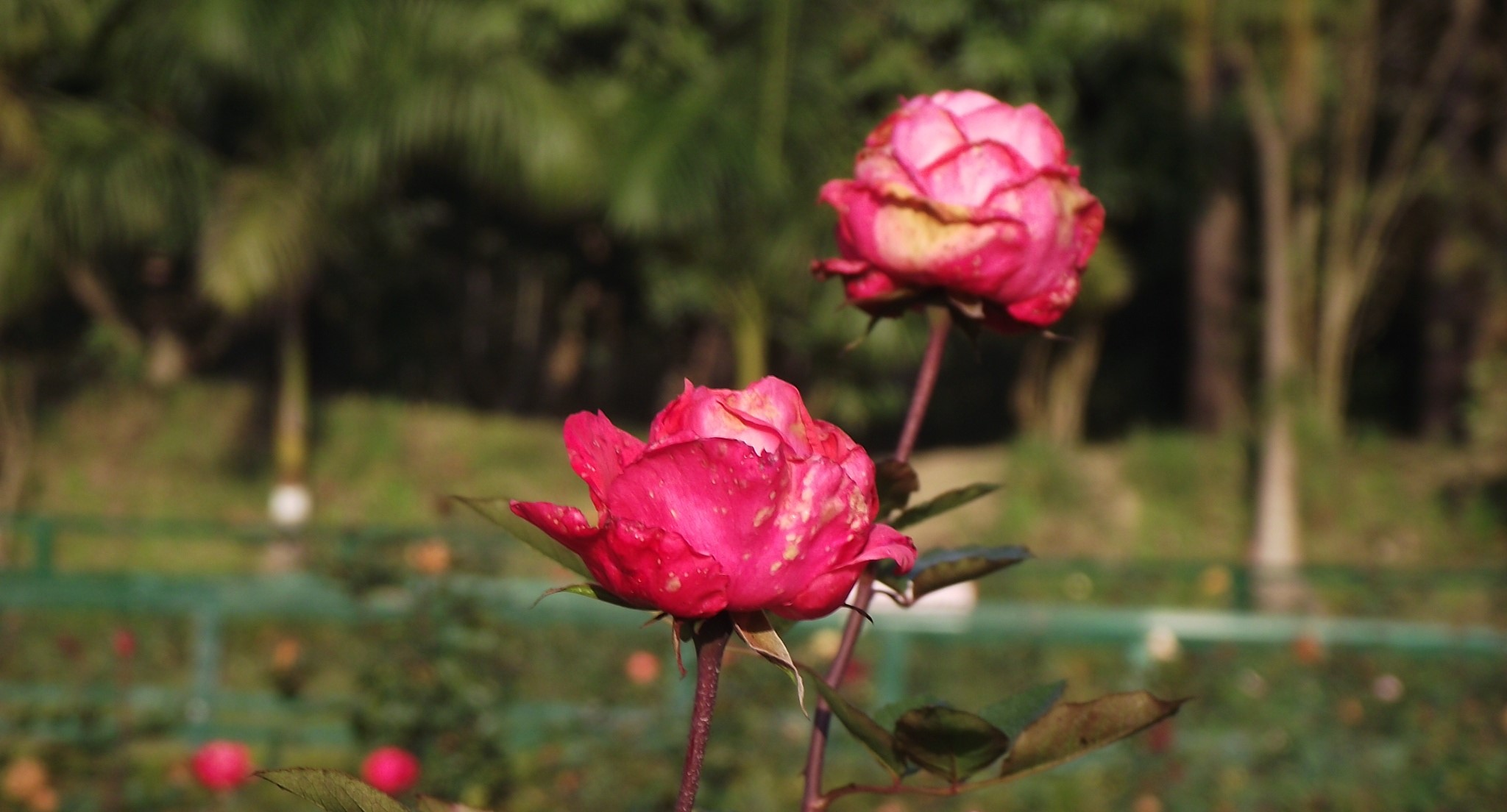
flora at Tikapur park
