= Aishworya Shrestha =

Nepali beauty pageant

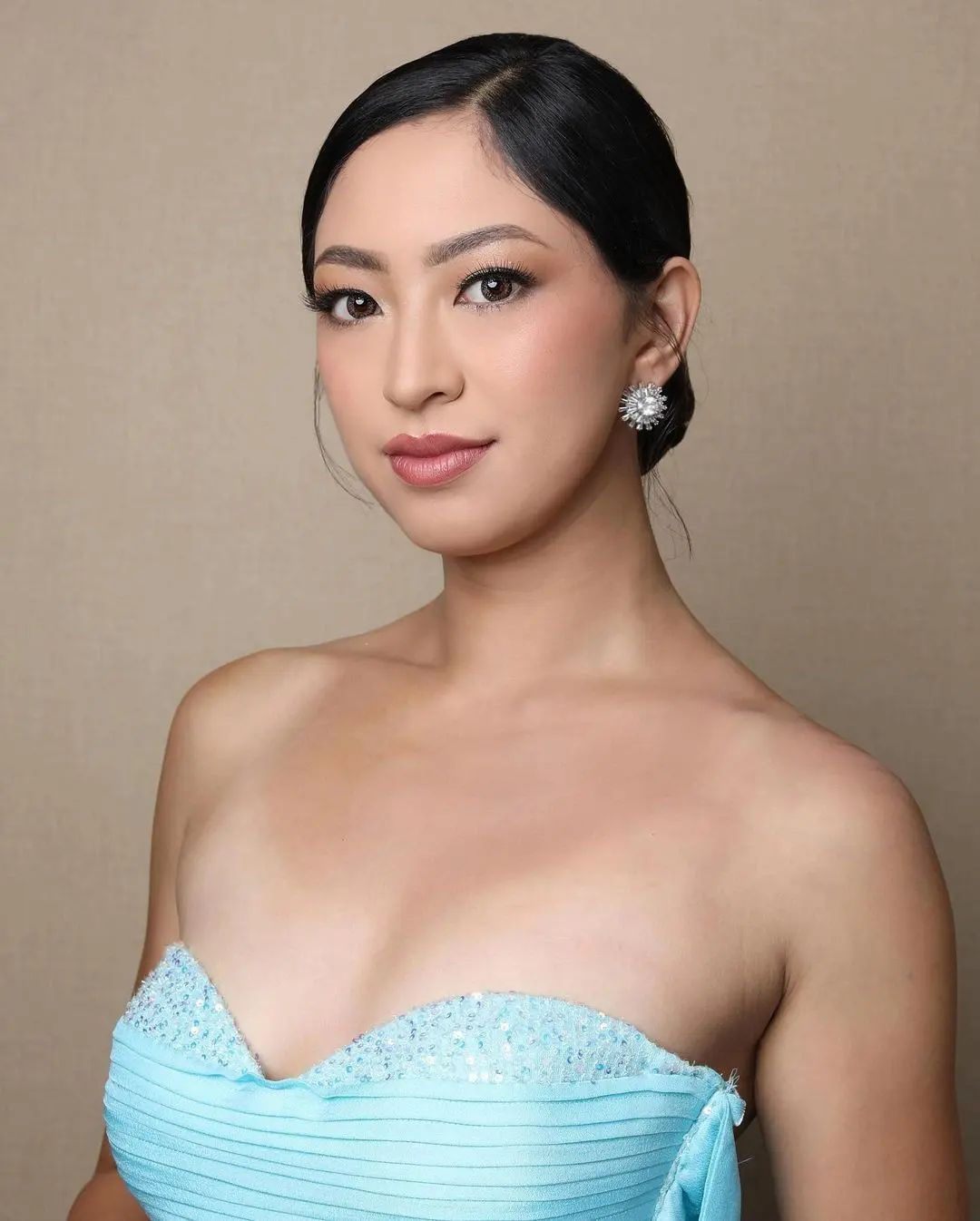
- Aishworya Shrestha in 2022
- Born: Kathmandu, Nepal
- Education: Masters in Social Work
- Alma mater: Tribhuvan University
- Occupation: Social Worker
- Height: 5 ft 6 in (168 cm)
- Title: Miss Grand Nepal 2022
- Predecessor: Ronali Amatya
- Successor: Garima Ghimire
- Awards: ClimateLaunchPad Nepal 2019 U.S. Embassy Youth Council Member 2021-2022 Miss Grand International Nepal 2022 Nepali Congress Policy Hackathon 2023 NICHOD National 3-Minute Thesis Competition (2023) Team EmpowHER 2023 Miss Intellectual, Miss Fitness - Miss Nepal 2023

Aishworya Shrestha (born 26 November 1997) is a Nepalese pageant titleholder as Miss Grand Nepal 2022. She represented Nepal in Miss Grand International 2022. She is a Nepali social worker and activist known for her work in establishing impactful grassroots programs related to mental health, education, women's empowerment, and civic engagement.

== Early life and education ==
Shrestha was born in Kathmandu, Nepal around 1997. She earned a bachelor's degree in social work and English from St. Xavier's College, Nepal, in 2017, and a master's degree in social work from Tribhuvan University in 2020, with a thesis focused on gender-based violence. As a student, Shrestha engaged in research on issues like child exploitation in brick kilns and gender-based violence. Her paper is published in multiple journals, including a publication on gbv and climate education using technology.

== Career ==
Shrestha has over eight years of experience working in the social impact sector in Nepal. She began her career in 2015 volunteering as a wheelchair basketball coach for disabled youth. From 2017 to 2022, she worked with various grassroots organizations and nonprofits in Nepal focused on literacy training, youth empowerment, disability rights, mental health, domestic violence support, and community mapping.

In September 2021, Shrestha founded Antardhoni Nepal, a nonprofit providing mental health awareness, workshops and support access to marginalized communities across Nepal. Through Antardhoni Nepal she has organized over 85 mental health events reaching 10,000 Nepalis.

In March 2020, she founded Heart of Nepal, a nonprofit focused on education and empowerment initiatives for Dalit children and mothers in Nepal. The organization has eliminated school dropouts and increased household income within these communities.

Shrestha has served as a project manager at Kathmandu Living Labs, a civic tech nonprofit, from 2021 to 2023. She has led research projects on topics like tourism, open mapping, youth empowerment, and climate change. She has also authored publications and presented her work at prominent conferences like the State of the Map and The Impacts of Civic Technology Conference.

== Work in Civic Tech ==
She has contributed to a number of civic tech projects including She Leads and She Inspires, starting local OSM communities, Visible Women.

== Leading CAP 2030 ==
She led the CAP 2030 Project in Nepal under the directive of WHO/Lancent Commission. Her team developed and tested 6 citizen science based mobile application for children in rural Jumla and Kavre imparting climate education to children in these 2 inaccessible regions. The project was successful in testing the use of mobile phones and technology in internet limited areas.

== Pageantry ==
=== Miss Grand Nepal 2022 ===
Aishworya won Miss Grand Nepal succeeding Ronali Amatya and received Rs 700,000 cash.

== Accomplishments and Recognition ==
Shrestha was awarded multiple grants and prizes for her work, including a US Embassy youth leadership award in 2021. She was selected as the winner of Miss Grand International Nepal in 2022.
