= Pahad =

Geographical region in the middle belt of Nepal

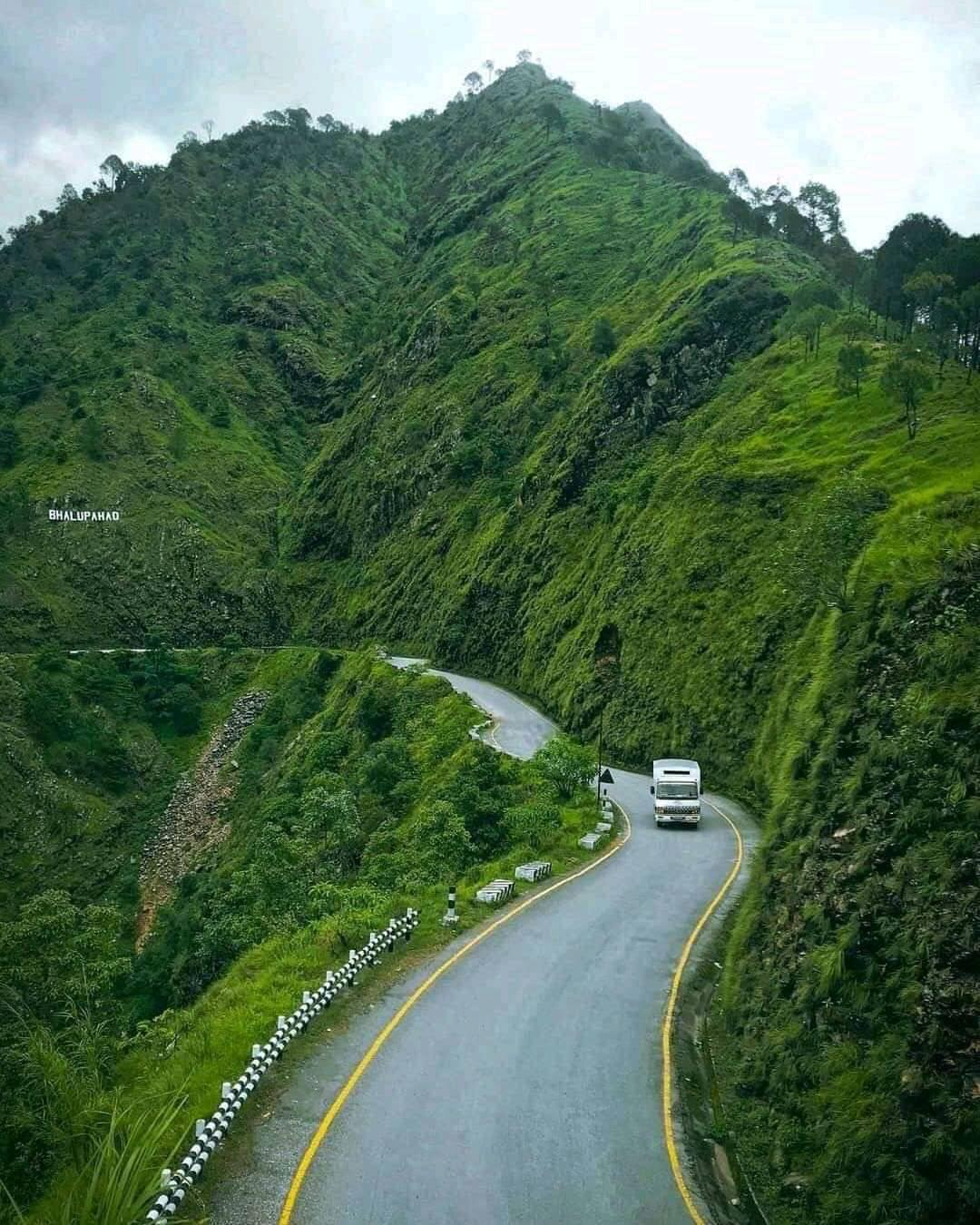
- Bhalu Pahad, Syangja District

Ecology
- Realm: Indomalayan realm
- Biome: Temperate broadleaf forest, Montane forests
- Animals: Himalayan tahr, red panda, Himalayan blue sheep
- Bird species: Himalayan monal, Blood pheasant, Kalij pheasant, Eurasian golden oriole, See list
- Mammal species: Himalayan black bear, Leopard, Sambar deer, Wild boar, Langur, Rhesus macaque, See list

Geography
- Countries: Nepal
- Elevation: 800 to 4,000 m (2,600 to 13,100 ft)
- Rivers: See list
- Climate type: subtropical to alpine climate
- Soil types: varied

Conservation
- Global 200: Himalayan subtropical pine forests

The Pahad (Nepali: पहाड, lit. 'hill' or 'mountain'), is a geographical region of Nepall that covers approximately 65% of the country's total land area. It forms the middle belt of Nepal, lying south of the high Himalayan region (Himal) and north of lowland plans (Tarai).

The region consists of rolling hills, steep ridges, and prominent valleys, including the Kathmandu Valley. Elevations generally range from 800 to 4,000 meters (2,600 to 13,100 ft) above sea level, mostly below the permanent snow line. The climate varies with elevation, from subtropical in the lower areas to alpine conditions at higher elevations. Summers are generally warm, whole winters can be cold, especially in higher areas. Most rainfall occurs during the summer monsoon, which usually lasts from June to September.

The Pahad is home to rich biodiversity, with a variety of forest types, including temperate broadleaf and subalpine conifer forests. The region is also home to diverse plant and animal life, including endemic species

== See also ==
- Pahadi people (Nepal)
