= Far Western University =

Public University in Mahendranagar. Nepal

- सुदूरपश्चिम विश्वविद्यालय
- Other name: SPU / FWU
- Type: Public university
- Established: August 2010 (16 years ago)
- Budget: Rs. 1.54 billion (USD $10.34 million) (2025–26)
- Chancellor: Prime Minister of Nepal
- Vice-Chancellor: Dr. Kisan Datta Bhatta
- Academic staff: 1,166 (~965 teaching staff 201 administrative and support personnel)
- Students: 8,203
- Location: Bhimdatta, Sudurpashchim, Nepal; 28.95553°N 80.17784°E
- Website: fwu.edu.np

Far Western University (FWU/SPU; Nepali: सुदूरपश्चिम विश्वविद्यालय) is a university in Nepal, located in Mahendranagar, Kanchanpur. It was established in August 2010 (2067 BS) by the Act of the Constituent Assembly by the Government of Nepal. It came into operation in 2011, after the appointment of the university officials. Prime Minister of Nepal serves as the Chancellor of the university.

== Constituent campuses ==
There are 15 constituent campuses of Far West University.

- Central Campus
- Tikapur Multiple Campus
- Darchula Multiple Campus
- Bajura Campus
- Triveni Multiple Campus
- Ghanteshwar Seti Mahakali Multiple Campus
- Sitaram Multiple Campus
- Janata Multiple Campus
- Jayaprithivi Multiple Campus
- Badimalika Campus
- Manilek Multiple Campus
- Patan Multiple Campus
- Jagannath Multiple Campus
- Gokuleshwor Multiple Campus
- Kailali Multiple Campus
- Durgalaxmi Multiple Campus

== Affiliated Colleges ==
- Aadim National College — Chabahil, Kathmandu
- Apex Management College — Birgunj, Parsa
- Arcane College — Kumaripati, Lalitpur
- Asian Institute of Technology and Management — Satdobato, Lalitpur
- Bardibas New Horizon College — Bardibas, Mahottari
- Bheri College of Engineering and Management — Nepalgunj, Banke
- Decimal Public College — Birgunj, Parsa
- Cambridge Business College — Birendranagar, Surkhet
- Dayanand College — Jawalakhel, Lalitpur
- Dreams College — Bharatpur, Chitwan
- Forbes College — Bharatpur, Chitwan
- Gandaki Education Foundation — Pokhara, Kaski
- Gandaki College of Science, Management, and Technology — Pokhara, Kaski
- Geruwa Multiple Campus — Geruwa, Bardiya
- Gyansudha Technical College — Ratnanagar
- Himalaya College — Koteshwar, Kathmandu
- Institute of Vision Management College — Lahan, Siraha
- Kathmandu World School of Engineering and Management — Suryabinayak, Bhaktapur
- Keystone Management College — Kohalpur, Banke
- Maharishi College — New Baneshwor, Kathmandu
- Mithila Institute of Technology — Janakpur, Dhanusha
- Pranita College of Management — Mirchaiya, Siraha
- Raghavendra Gaurav Multiple Campus — Krishnanagar, Kapilvastu
- Reliable College — Minbhawan, Kathmandu
- Sagun College of Management — Nepalgunj, Banke
- Shikshalaya College — Lokanthali, Bhaktapur
- Gyan Jyoti College — Tulsipur, Dang
- Siddhapaila Campus — Birendranagar, Surkhet
- Technical Research for Training Institute — Nepalgunj, Banke
- Western Advance College of Engineering and Management — Gaidakot, Nawalparasi
- Western College and Research Center — Birendranagar, Surkhet
- Western College of Business Studies — Kohalpur, Banke �

== Faculties and programmes ==
- Faculty of Agriculture Science (B.Sc. Ag)
- Faculty of Management (BBA, BBS, MBA)
- Faculty of Education (B.Ed., M.Phil.)
- Faculty of Humanities and Social Sciences ( BA, BSW)
- Faculty of Science and Technology (B.Sc., B Ed.CSIT, B.Sc. CSIT, BIT, M.Sc.CSIT)
- Faculty of Law (BA LLB)
- Faculty of Natural Resource Management (BSc Forestry)
- Faculty of Engineering (BE Civil, BE Computer, BE Architecture, ME Structural Engineering (Proposed))
