= Mustang District =

Mustang District मुस्ताङ जिल्ला
- District
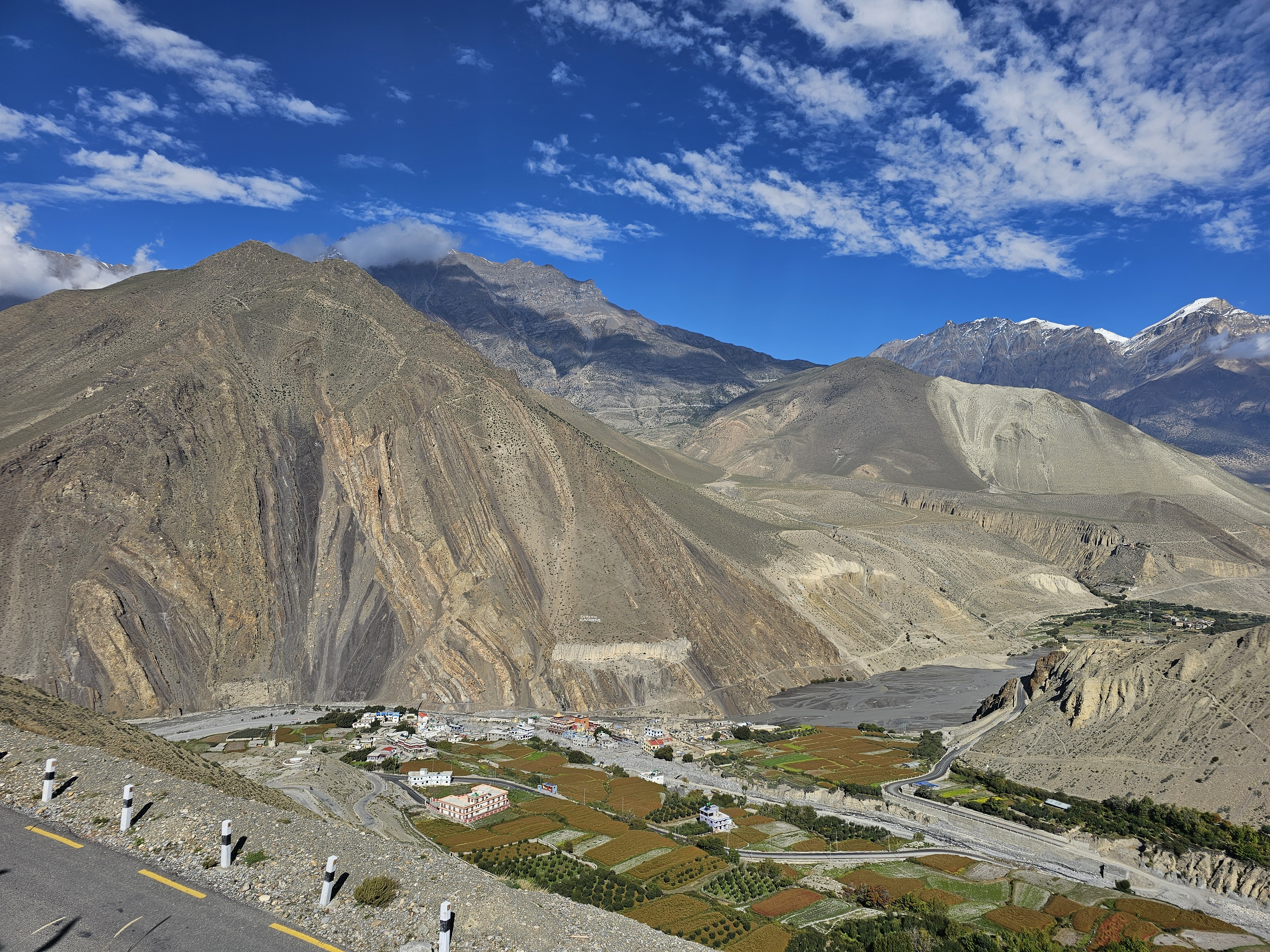
- Kali Gandaki Valley is located near Kagbeni, Mustang, the gateway to Upper Mustang.

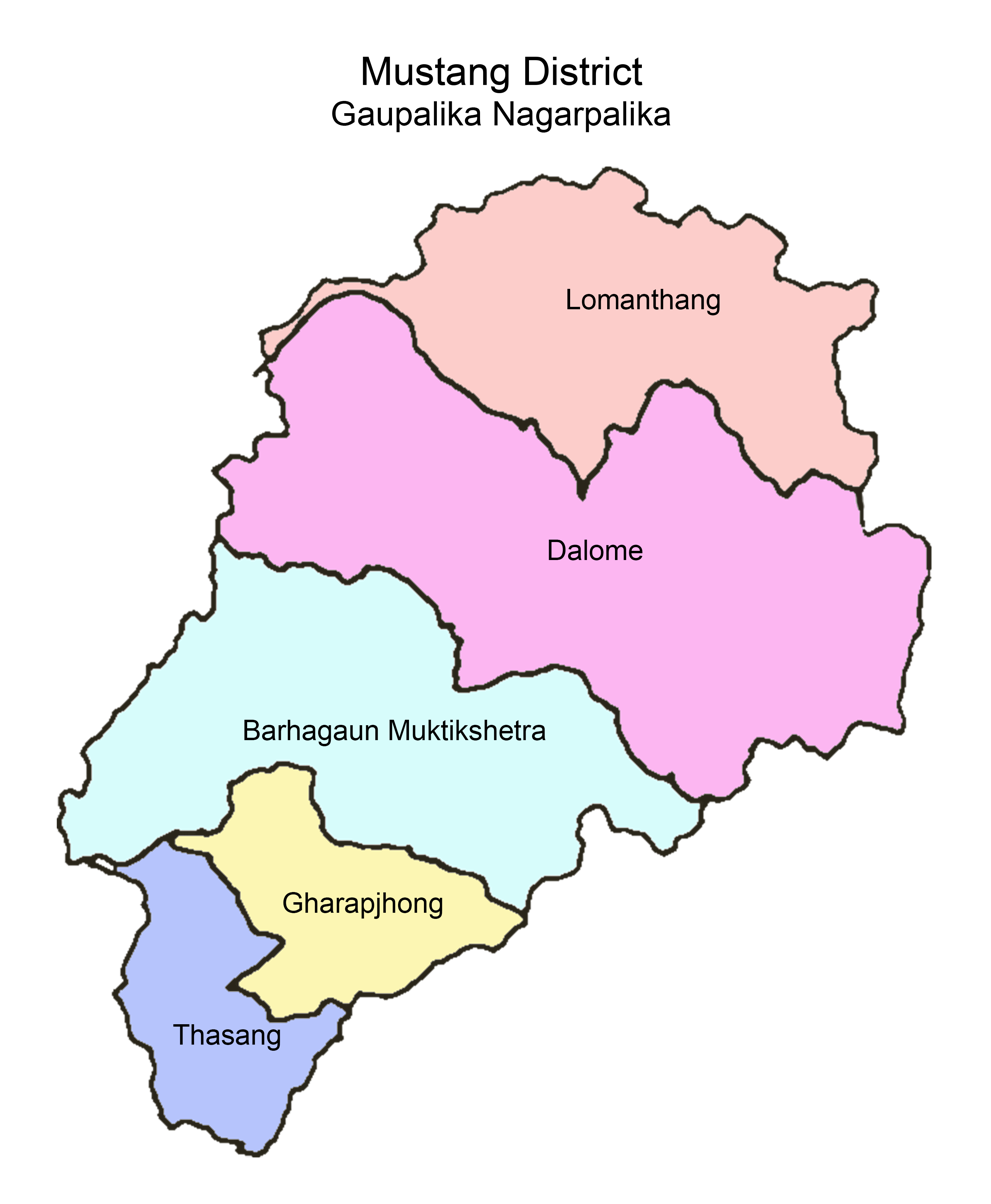
- Divisions of Mustang
- Interactive map of Mustang District
- Country: Nepal
- Province: Gandaki Province
- Admin HQ.: Jomsom

Government
  - Type: Coordination committee
  - Body: DCC, Mustang
  - Head: Chhiring Lhamo Gurung
  - Deputy-Head: Rajendra Sherchan
  - Parliamentary constituencies: 1
  - Provincial constituencies: 2

Area
  - Total: 3,573 km^{2} (1,380 sq mi)
  - Rank: 5th
- Highest elevation: 8,167 m (26,795 ft)
- Lowest elevation: 2,010 m (6,590 ft)

Population (2011)
  - Total: 13,452
  - Density: 3.765/km^{2} (9.751/sq mi)
  - Households: 3,305
- Time zone: UTC+05:45 (NPT)
- Postal Codes: 33100, 33102, 33103... 33109
- Telephone Code: 069
- Main language(s): Nepali, Gurung, Thakali, Tibetan
- Website: ddcmustang.gov.np

Mustang (Nepali: मुस्ताङ जिल्ला, romanized: Mustāṅ Jillā) (Note: Nepali: मुस्ताङ — from Tibetan möntang (Wylie: smon-thang), meaing 'fertile plain') is a district in Gandaki Province, located in northern Nepal. It is one of the seventy-seven districts of Nepal and covers an area of 3,573 km^{2} (1,380 sq mi), making it the fifth-largest district in Nepal by area. According to 2021 Nepal Census, the district has an population of 14,452. It's administrative headquarters is Jomsom.

The district is located in Gandaki Province in northern Nepal, straddling the Himalayas and extending northward onto the Tibetan Plateau. It is among the most remote and least densely populated districts of the country. Elevation ranges from 1,372 meters to 8,167 meters at Dhaulagiri, the seventh-highest mountain in the world, with several peaks exceeding 7,000 meters.

Agriculture and animal husbandry are the primary occupations of the population. The entire district lies within the Annapurna Conservation Area, the largest protected area in Nepal. Conservation, tourism regulation, and development activities are managed by the Annapurna Conservation Area Project (ACAP), a division of the National Trust for Nature Conservation.

Upper Mustang remained a restricted area until 1992, which has helped preserve its cultural heritage and traditional way of life. The name “Mustang” is derived from a Tibetan term meaning “plain of aspiration." Since its opening to foreign visitors in 1992, Upper Mustang has become a regulated trekking destination, with a limited annual entry quota, and remains accessible throughout the year.

The district is home to several important religious and cultural sites, including the renowned Muktinath Temple, a sacred pilgrimage site for both Hindus and Buddhists.

According to the Human Development Index, Mustang is considered relatively well-developed compared to other remote Himalayan districts, with an estimated GDP per capita of approximately US$2,466.

== Geography ==
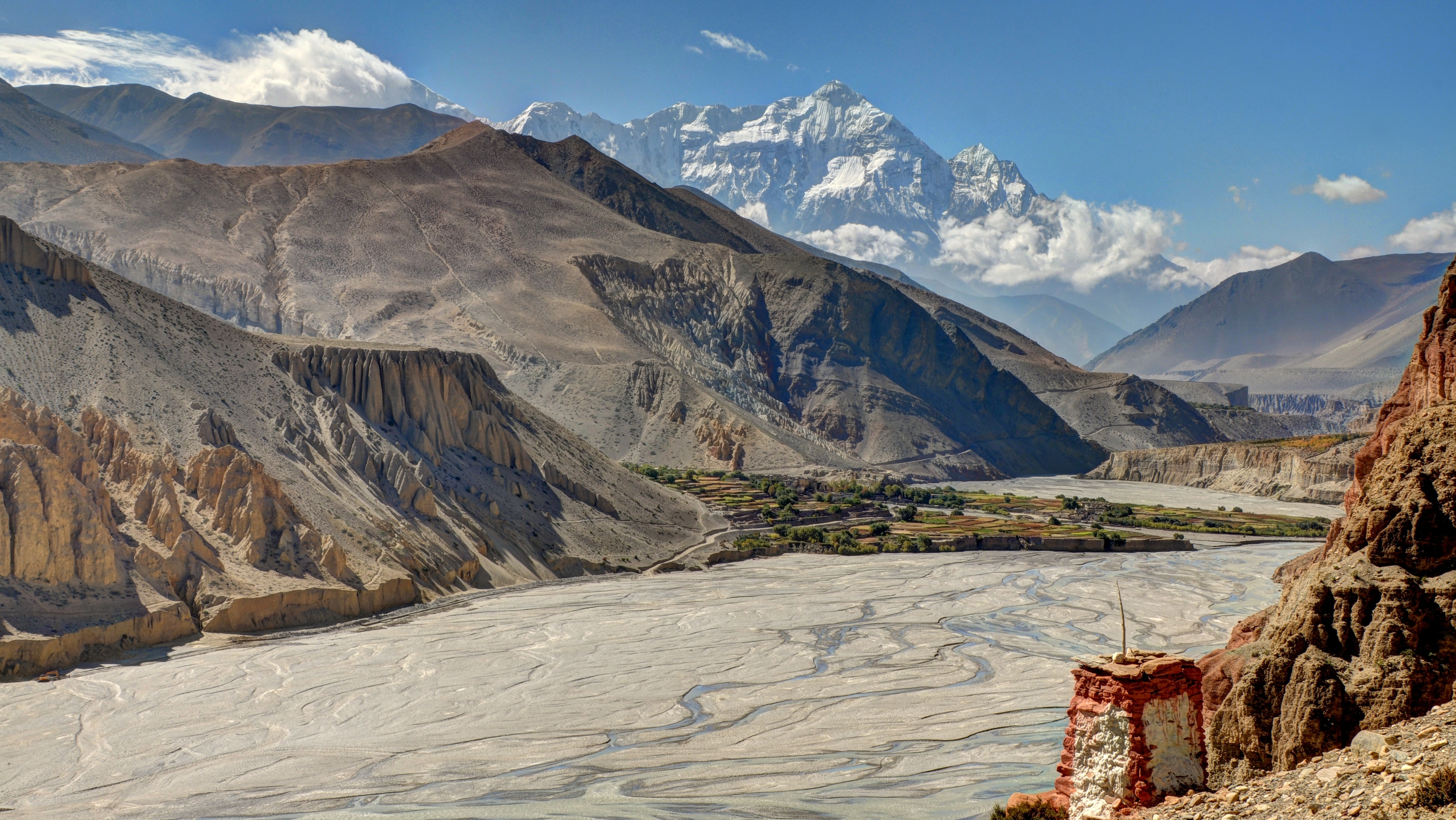
Kali Gandaki riverbed in Upper Mustang. View from Chele (Tshele) village down to the Kali Gandaki river and the fields of Chhusang in front of Nilgiri mountains's steep north face.

Description	Area covered (km2)	% of Area
Total area of the district	3639.6	100%
Total forest area	123.2	3.38%
Total cultivable land	40.3	1.10%
Irrigated cultivable land	32.5	0.89%
Rain-fed cultivable land	7.83	0.21%
Pasture land	1476.8	40.57%
River, stream, cliff, mountain, stone etc.	1505.7	41.36%
Area covered by residence and buildings	3.20	0.08%
Area covered by snow	305.9	8.40%
Area covered by lakes	0.92	0.02%
Other	183.5	5.04%

Mustang, the second least populated district of Nepal, is flanked by the Nepalese districts of Manang, the least populated, to the east and Dolpa, the third least populated, to the west. The Tibetan frontier stretches north from Mustang's borders. Mustang is divided into two sub-regions, Lower and Upper. This is a high-altitude trans-Himalayan region spread over 3,640 square kilometres in area barely north of the main Himalayan mountain range. Geographically this cold high-altitude steppe is a part of the Tibetan highlands. This boot-shaped piece of land thrusts north into western Tibet is caught in the rain shadow of Dhaulagiri to the south and west and the Annapurna Massif to the north and east.

Average elevation of Mustang is 13,200 ft (4,023m), coming to a peak at 8,167m — the summit of Dhaulagiri. It is a vast and arid valley, distinguished by eroded canyons, vividly coloured stratified rock formations and barren high-altitude deserts. The area receives an average annual rainfall of less than 260 mm at Jomsom in the Lower Mustang. Spring and autumn are generally dry, but some precipitation is brought by summer monsoons, which averaged 133 mm at Jomsom between 1973 and 2000. The mean minimum monthly air temperature falls to -2.7 °C in winter while the maximum monthly air temperature reaches 23.1 °C in summer. Both diurnal and annual variations in temperature are large. Only about 40.3 square kilometres, about 1 per cent of the total land area, is cultivated and 1,477 square kilometres, about 40%, is pasture land. Kora La at 4,660 metres (15,290 ft) in elevation is considered the lowest drivable path between Tibetan Plateau and Indian subcontinent.

The elevation of the district range from 1640m in nearby Kopchepani under Kunjo VDC to 7061m in Nilgiri North above from the sea level. The peaks above 6000m in Mustang District are Tukuche Peak (6920m), Nilgiri South (6839m), Yakwakang Peak (6462m), and Damodar Himal (6004m). Thorung Pass (5416m), arguably the world's highest and busiest pass, is located in this district. This district share 134.16 km (83.36 mi) long international border with Tibet Autonomous Region of China where 16 boundary pillars are in existence from pillar no. 18–33.

Climate zone	Elevation Range	% of Area
Temperate	2,000 to 3,000 meters 6,400 to 9,800 ft.	4.0%
Subalpine	3,000 to 4,000 meters 9,800 to 13,100 ft.	4.7%
Alpine	4,000 to 5,000 meters 13,100 to 16,400 ft.	2.7%
Nival	above 5,000 meters	8.8%
Trans-Himalayan	3,000 to 6,400 meters 9,800 to 21,000 ft.	79.8%

The Kali Gandaki River is a highly important feature of the district. Its source located near the Tibetan border coincides with the Tibetan border and Ganges-Brahmaputra watershed divide. From there, it flows south towards the northern Indian plains through the ancient kingdom of Mustang. It flows through a sheer-sided, deep canyon immediately south of the Mustang capital of Lo Manthang, then widens as it approaches Kagbeni where high Himalayan ranges begin to close in. The river continues southward past Jomsom, Marpha, and Tukuche to the deepest part of the gorge about 7 km (4.3 mi) south of Tukuche in the area of Lete. The gorge then broadens past the border of Mustang and Myagdi districts. Geographically, Lower Mustang lies between the Tibetan Plateau in the North and high Himalayan Mountains in the South. The region between the Tibetan Plateau and Himalayan Mountain is called Trans-Himalaya.

The Kali Gandaki Gorge or Andha Galchi, measured by the difference between the river height and the heights of the highest peaks on either side, is the world's deepest canyon. The portion of the river directly between Dhaulagiri and Annapurna I (7 km downstream from Tukuche) is at an elevation of 2,520 m or 8,270 ft, 5,571 m or 18,278 ft lower than Annapurna I. Major peaks along the gorge include Dhaulagiri (8,167 m or 26,795 ft) and Tukuche (6,920 m or 22,703 ft) on the west and Nilgiri Central (6,940 m or 22,769 ft) and Annapurna (8,091 m or 26,545 ft) on the east.

== History ==
Flag of the Mustang Kingdom, founded by Ame Pal in 1380

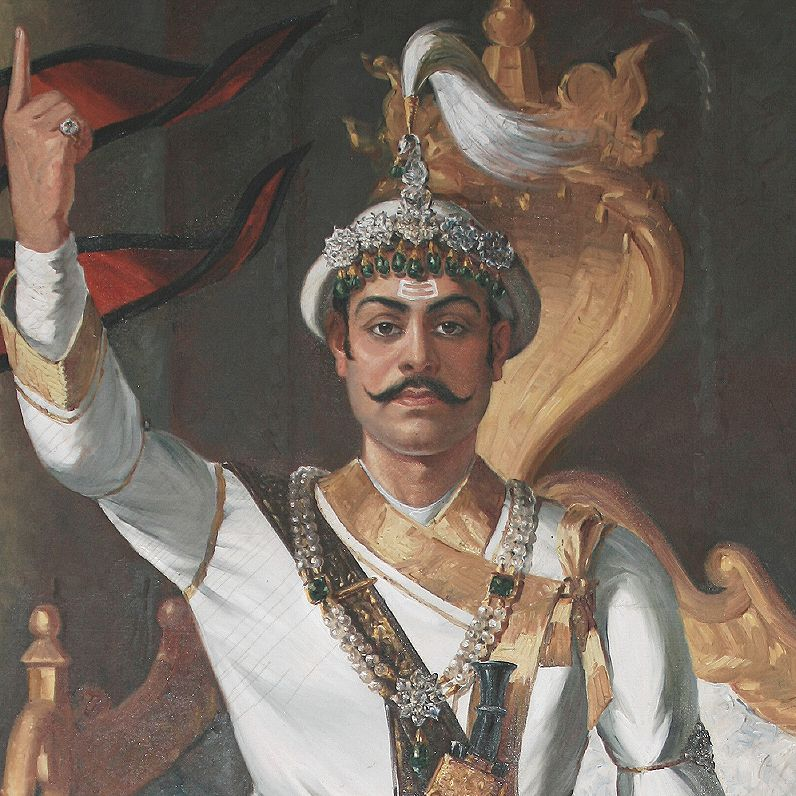
Portrait of King Prithvi Narayan Shah who annexed the kingdom in 1769

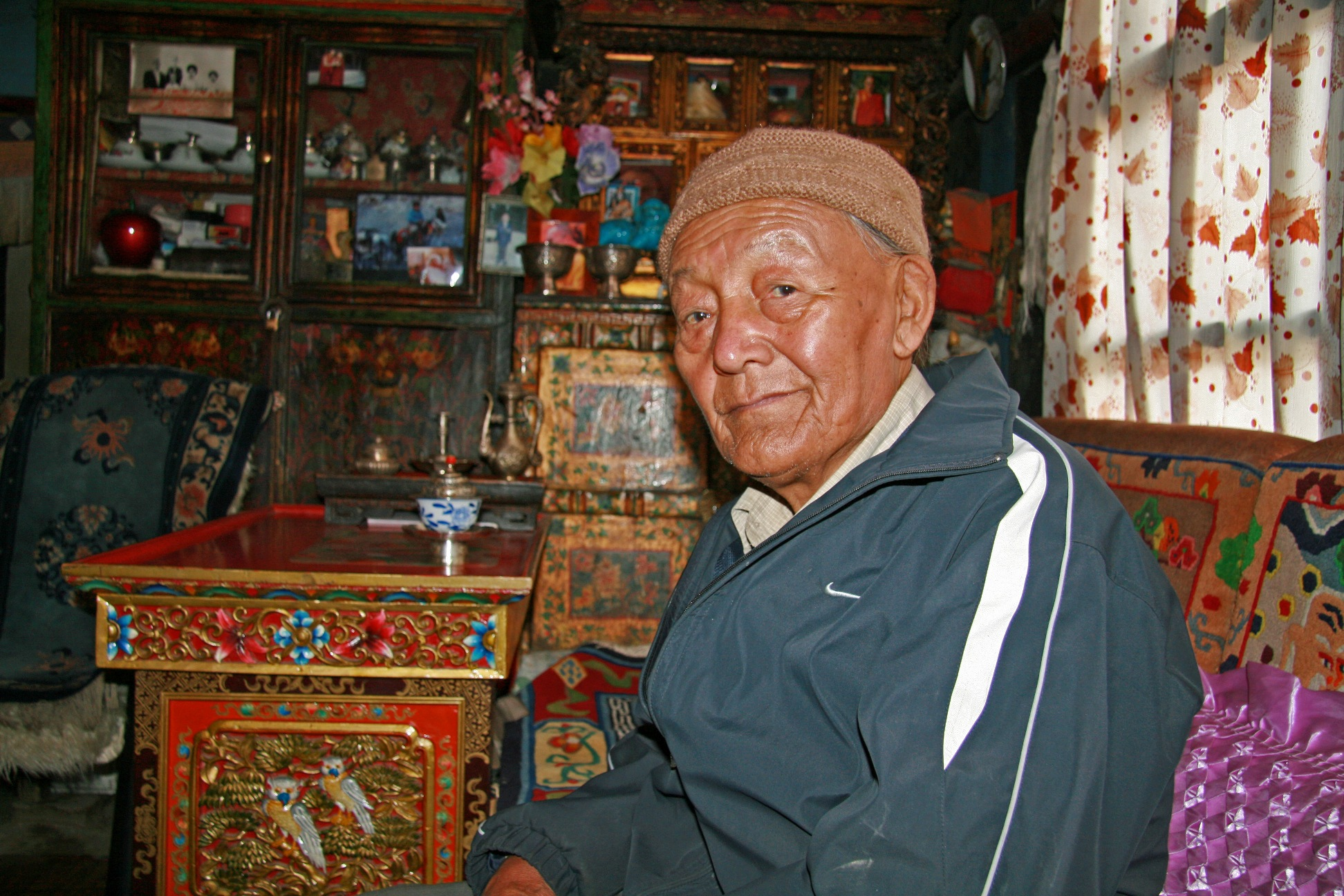
The last king Jigme Dorje Palbar Bista before the kingdom was abolished in 2008

Much of the history of Mustang is about legends rather than documented facts. However, it is believed that Mustang or the Kingdom of Lo was once a part of Ngari area of Tibet and a loose collection of feudal estates, their history is also tied to Tibetan religion and culture, geography, and politics. It was often closely linked to adjoining kingdoms of Western Tibet and, during other periods of history, politically linked to Lhasa, the capital of Central Tibet. Lo was incorporated into the Tibetan Empire by Songtsen Gampo, the most famous Tibetan king.

From the 15th century to the 17th century, Mustang had control over the trade between the Himalayas and India because of its strategic location. In 1380, Lo became an independent kingdom under Ame Pal. The last royal family traced its lineage for 25 generations, all the way back to Ame Pal. Ame Pal oversaw the founding and building of much of the Lo and Mustang capital of Lo Manthang, a walled city surprisingly little changed in appearance from that time period. The only remnant of these kingdoms is the still-intact Kingdom of Lo, an area corresponding to the northern third of Mustang District.

In 1769, the army of Prithvi Narayan Shah, the first King the Kingdom of Nepal, unified what was a land of many small kingdoms to forge Nepal. Before that much of present-day Mustang was ruled by kings from Jumla, a region to the southwest, and independent kings and feudal lords. At the end of the 18th century, the kingdom was annexed by Nepal and became a dependency of the Kingdom of Nepal since 1795. Swedish explorer Sven Hedin's visited the pass at the head of the Kali Gandaki Gorge in 1904. British Tibetologist David Snellgrove visited and researched Mustang's Buddhist temples and monasteries in 1956, 1960–61 and 1978.

During the late 1950s and 60s, Mustang became the centre for Tibetan guerrillas engaged in small operations against the Annexation of Tibet by the People's Republic of China in 1959. Tibetan guerrilla group Chushi Gangdruk operated out of Upper Mustang with the intention of raiding PLA positions in Tibet, which led to a border incident that caused the killing of a Nepalese officer who was mistaken as a Tibetan rebel. These guerrillas were aided by CIA and Tibetan Khampas. In the 1970s, after US president Richard Nixon had visited China, CIA withdrew its support and the Nepalese government disbanded Tibetan fighters. In 1961, People's Republic of China and Kingdom of Nepal officially signed a border agreement, setting the border between Mustang and Tibet Autonomous Region set slightly north of the traditional boundary marker demarcated by a stupa at 29°18′14″N 83°58′7″E.

Up until 2008, the Kingdom of Lo or Upper Mustang was an ethnic Tibetan kingdom and a suzerainty of Kingdom of Nepal. The suzerainty allowed for a certain level of independence in local governance from the Nepalese central government. Though still recognised by many Mustang residents, the monarchy ceased to exist on 7 October 2008, by order of the Government of Nepal. After the civil war that overthrew the Nepalese monarchy, it became a republic. Mustang became another district of Nepal losing its status of a tributary kingdom it enjoyed since the late eighteenth century. Mustang is the setting for a large part of the book The Kingdom, a novel by Clive Cussler and Grant Blackwood published in 2011. In December 1999, Ogyen Trinley Dorje, the 17th claimant Karmapa fled Tibet through this area. In response, China built a border fence immediately after. There is a PLA border outpost a few miles on Chinese side, it is the westernmost border outpost in Tibet Military District. The outpost was renovated in 2009 to have a modern facility.

== Royal Family ==
Jigme Dorje became head of the Royal House of Lo, assuming the title Lo Gyalpo (King of Mustang), after his elder brother, King Angdu Nyingpo Palbar, died at a young age. Lo Gyalpo Angdu Nyingpo had married a Tibetan aristocrat and left behind only two young daughters; his eldest, Lo Selmo (Princess) Chimi Dolkar Palbar Bista, and a younger daughter whose name is unrecorded. Princess Chimi Dolkar later had two sons, one of whom married a Princess of Bhutan. The crown passed to his younger brother, Jigme Dorje. King Jigme Dorje married a noble lady from Shigatse, Tibet, Sahiba Sidol in the 1950s. He had one son, Angun Tenzin, who died at the age of 8, and later adopted his nephew, Jigme Singhe Palbar Bista (b. 1957). King Jigme Dorje died on 16 December 2016 after living a retired life largely in Kathmandu since 2008 when Nepal abolished its own monarchy. Today, members of the Lo royal family are dispersed across Kathmandu, San Francisco, and Upper Mustang.

=== Sky caves ===
Sky caves

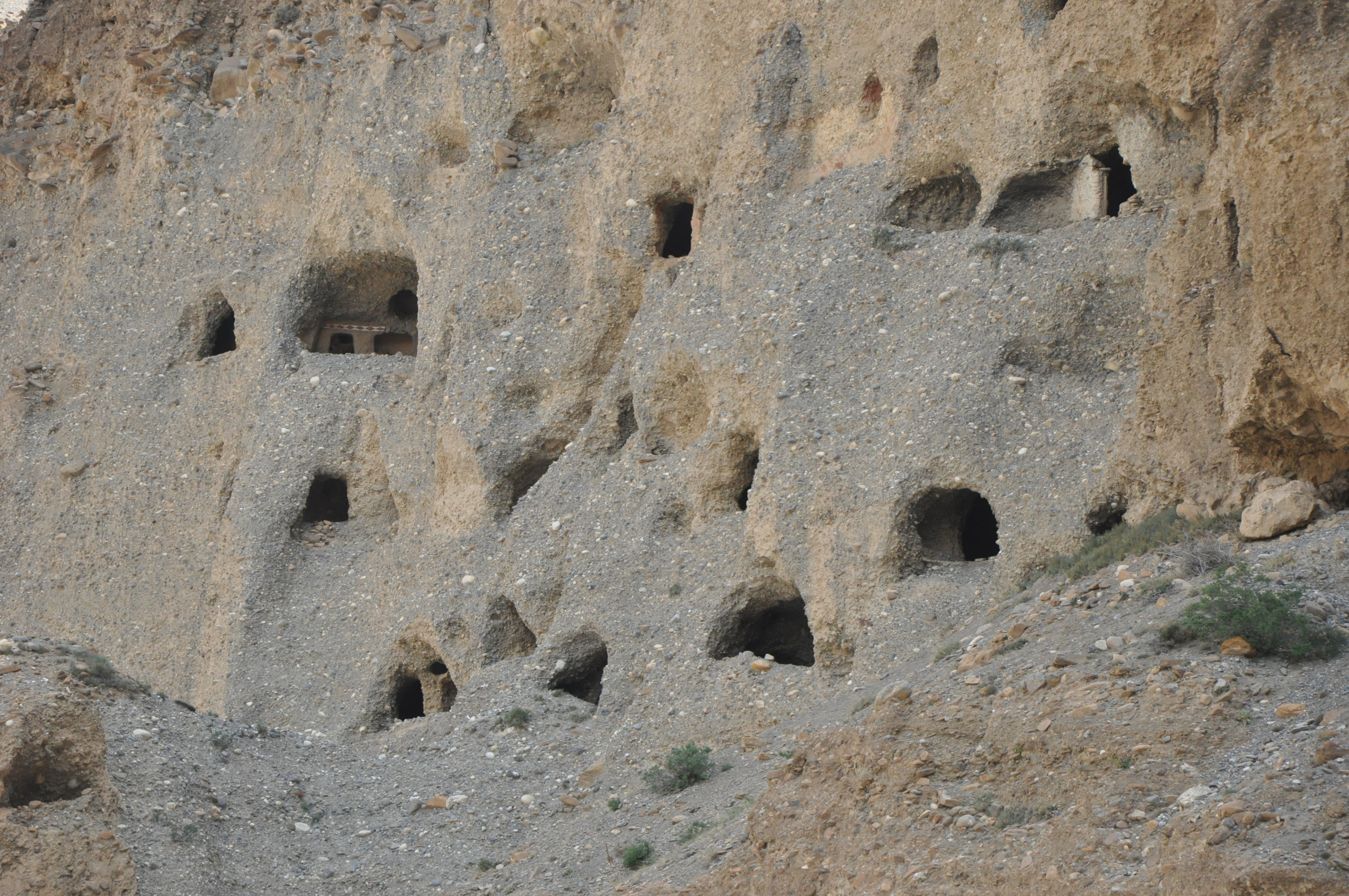
Sky caves in Chhusang

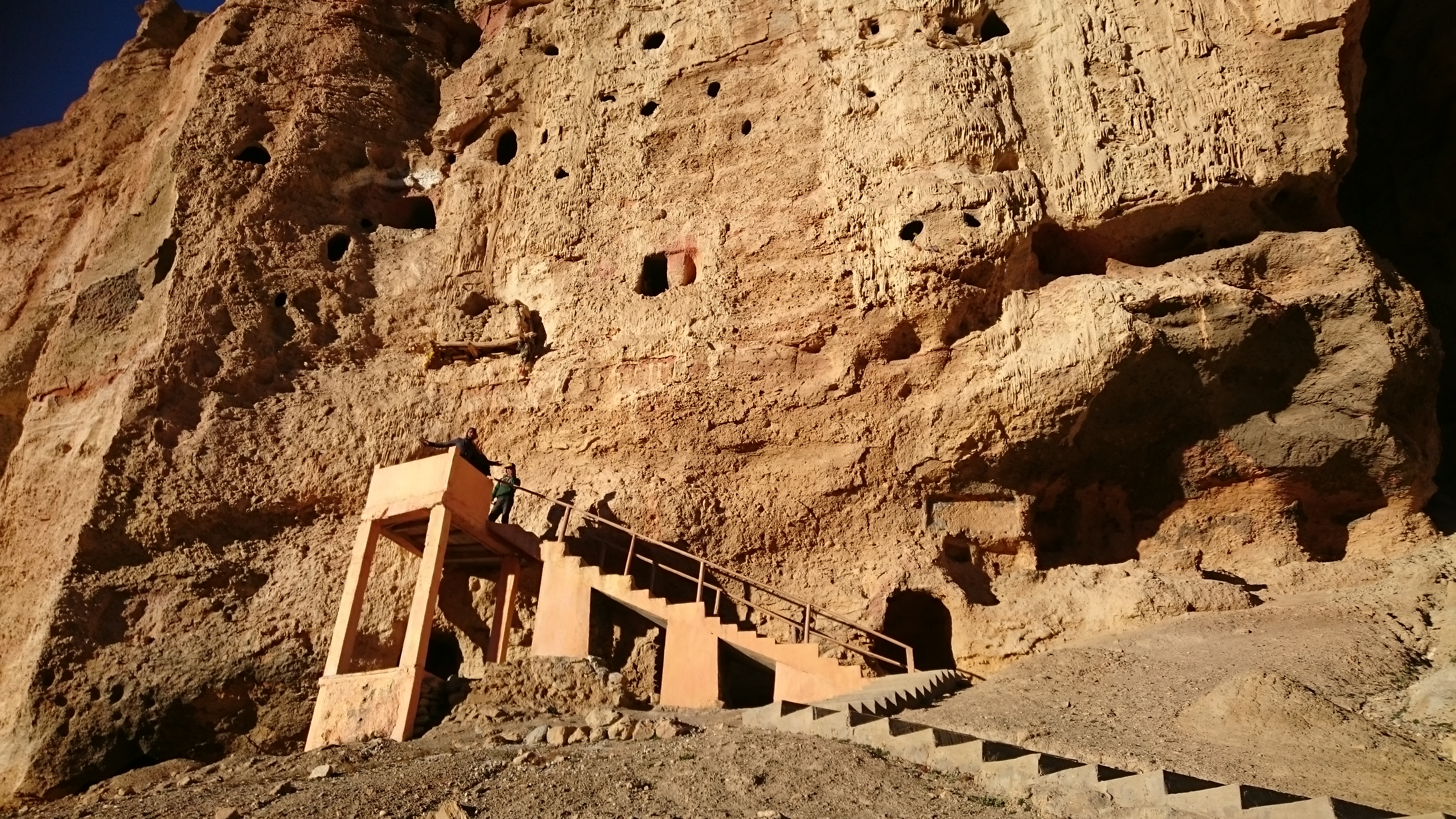
Sky caves at Chhoser village, Lo Manthang

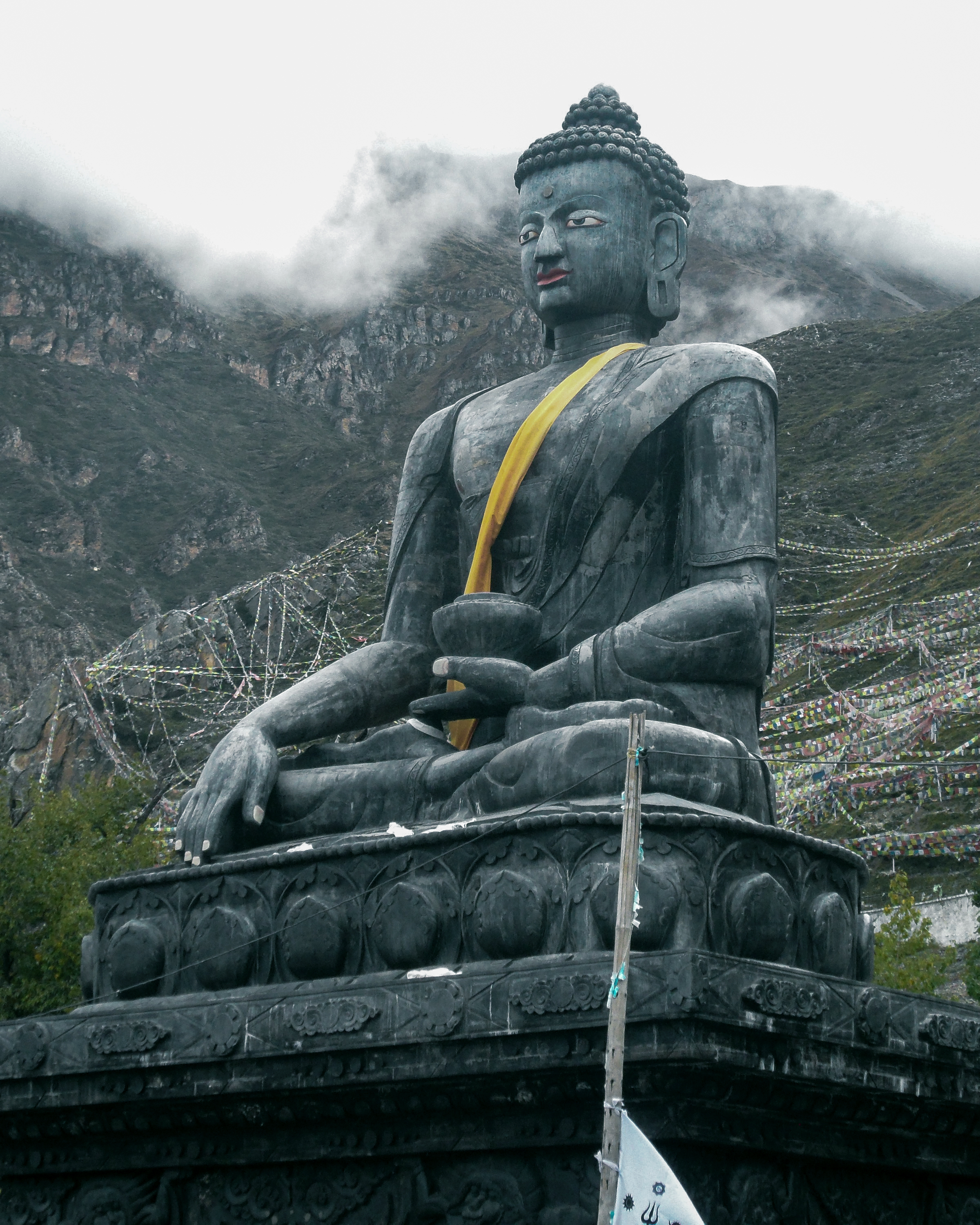
Statue of the Buddha in Muktinath zone

One feature of the district are thousands of cliff dwellings, some highly inaccessible. These Mustang Caves or Sky Caves of Nepal are a collection of some 10,000 man-made caves dug into the sides of valleys in the Mustang. Several groups of archaeologists and researchers have explored these stacked caves and found partially mummified human bodies and skeletons that are at least 2,000–3,000 years old. Explorations of these caves by conservators and archaeologists have also led to the discovery of valuable Buddhist paintings, sculptures, manuscripts and numerous artefacts belonging to the 12th to 14th century. The caves lie on the steep valley walls near the Kali Gandaki River in Upper Mustang.

In 2007, explorers from the United States, Italy and Nepal discovered ancient Buddhist decorative art and paintings, manuscripts and pottery in the Mustang caves near Lo Manthang, dating back to the 13th century. In 2008, a number of 600-year-old human skeletons were discovered by a second expedition. They also recovered reams of invaluable manuscripts containing writings from both the Bon religion and Buddhism, some of which were illuminated. Research groups have continue to investigate these caves, as it is not clear who built the caves and why were they built. According to theory, they may date back to 8–10,000 BCE when Mustang was much greener.

In 2007, a shepherd discovered a collection of 55 cave paintings near the village depicting the life of the Buddha. A series of at least twelve caves were discovered north of Annapurna and near the village of Lo Manthang, decorated with ancient Buddhist paintings and set in sheer cliffs at 14,000 feet (4,300 m) elevation. The paintings show Newari influence, dating to approximately the 13th century, and also contain Tibetan scripts executed in ink, silver and gold and pre-Christian era pottery shards. Explorers found stupas, decorative art and paintings depicting various forms of the Buddha, often with disciples, supplicants and attendants, with some mural paintings showing sub-tropical themes containing palm trees, billowing Indian textiles and birds.

== Administration ==
5 Gaunpalikas: Gharapjhong, Thasang, Barhagaun Muktichhetra, Lomanthang, Dalome 16 Village Development Committees (VDCs): Charang • Chhonhup • Chhoser • Chhusang • Dhami • Jhong • Jomsom • Kagbeni • Kowang • Kunjo • Lete • Lo Manthang • Marpha • Muktinath • Surkhang • Tukuche

Mustang District was a part of Dhaulagiri Zone in Nepal's Western Development Region. In 2017, Ministry of Federal Affairs and Local Development (Nepal) re-structured the area into five Gaunpalikas or rural municipalities with five areas each, which are different from old VDCs. Since establishment of Kingdom of Mustang until restructuring of local governance of Nepal, the area of this district was divided into one parliamentary constituency, nine Ilakas, and 16 Village Development Committees (VDCs). While an Ilaka functioned as the local development unit, the VDCs functioned as local political units.

Before the VDCs there was the system of village community councils from 1960 to 1990, which forms the lowest strata of local administration. To be entitled to common property resources like pastures, forests and water for irrigation, it was necessary for a household to become a member and participate in the community council. Any endowment of such entitlement was the council's prerogative. All households of the village had representation in the council. A gemba (council leader), chosen from any male member of the council between 18 and 60 years of age, was appointed on yearly rotation. The council settled disputes, called for community work when needed, and distributed rights and responsibilities to community members.

Individual households managed their private farms, while the council managed the community farm-system. The pastures and forests were exclusive to each community, where every household had an entitlement graze or collect wood, though collecting leaves and wood from trees in private ownership were more common.

Gaunpalika	Population 2011	Area	Population density	Villages	Center
Gharapjhong (घरपझोङ)	3,029	316	10	Syang (स्याङ), Jomsom (जोमसोम), Chhairo (छैरो), Marpha (मार्फा), Thini (ठिनी), Chimang (चिमाङ)	Jomsom
Thasang (थासाङ)	2,912	289	10	Lete (लेते), Tukuche (टुकुचे), Kunjo (कुञ्जो), Kobang (कोवाङ)	Kobang
Varagung Muktichhetra (बाह्रगाउँ मुक्तिक्षेत्र)	2,330	886	3	Kagbeni (कागवेनी), Khinga (खिङ्गा), Jhong (झोङ), Chhusang (छुसाङ)	Kagbeni
Lomanthang (लोमन्थाङ)	1,899	727	3	Chhoser (छोसेर), Lo Manthang (लोमन्थाङ), Chhonhup (छोन्हुप)	Lo Manthang
Lo-Ghekar Damodarkunda (लो-घेकर दामोदरकुण्ड)	1,423	1,344	1	Ghami (घमी), Surkhang (सुर्खाङ), Charang (चराङ)	Charang

== Divisions ==
Traditionally, Mustang District has been divided into four social and geographical regions. From south to north they are: Thak Satsae (also known as lower Thak Khola), Panchgaon (upper Thak Khola) and Baragaon (mostly considered part of Thak Khola, sometime called lower Lo) in Lower Mustang and Lo Tsho Dyun or (also known simply as Lo) in Upper Mustang, though it is becoming increasingly difficult to distinguish between areas along social lines as different castes and ethnic people started to live all over the region.

=== Thak Khola ===
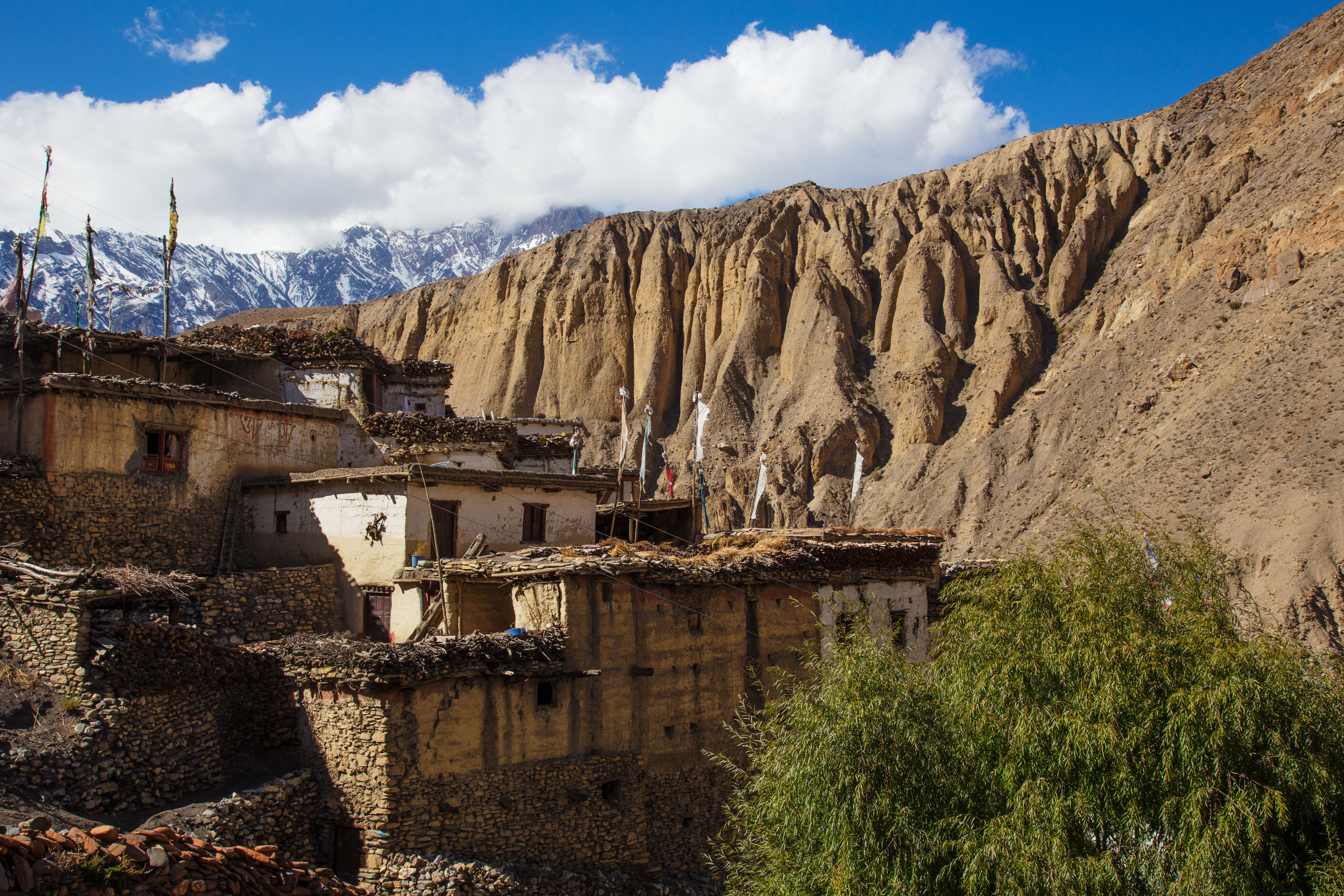
Lupra village in Thak Khola

Along the Kali Gandaki River in Lower Mustang, the Thakali are the dominant ethnic group. The area, extending from Ghasa in south to district headquarter Jomsom in the north, is known as Thak Khola ("Thak River"). The area was ruled by a Tibetan ruler till 1786, when it was included in Nepal. Historically, the region was under Tibetan ruler, but after 1786, it was included in Nepal. Ethnically, Thakalis are categorised as Tamang Thakalis from Thak Satsae, and Mawatan Thakali and Yhulkasompaimhi Thakalis from Panchgaon. The languages spoken by Thakalis fall in Tibeto-Burman category, and they believe in Buddhism.

==== Thak Satsae ====
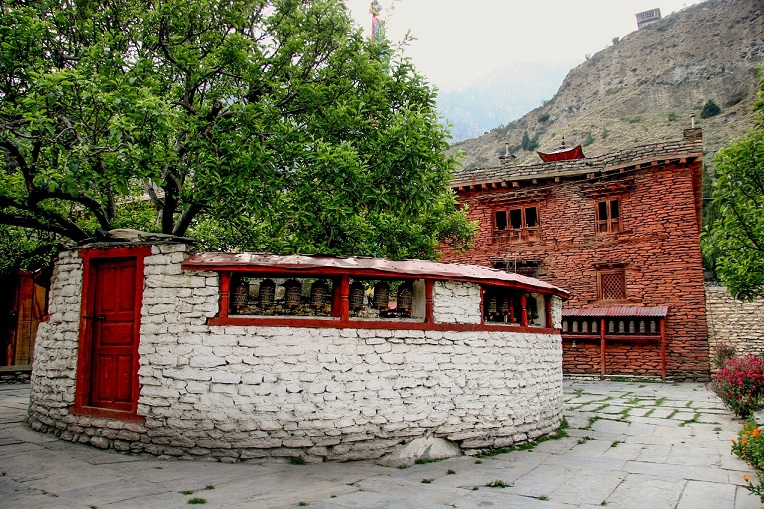
Tsampa gompa at Tukuche

Thak Satsae ("Seven Hundred Thak") is the most southerly sub-region of Mustang. The sub-region extends from the village of Ghasa in the south to the trading town of Tukuche in the north, bordering Jomsom (the district headquarter). Traditionally believed to have 700 households, the sub-region encompasses 13 villages along Thak Khaki, a segment of the Kali Gandaki located south of Jomsom (also called Tehragaon or "thirteen villages"): Ghasa, Taglung, Dhamphu, Kunjo, Titi, Sauru Khanti, Lete, Kobang, Nakung, Naurikot, Bhurjungkot, Larjung and Tukuche. They were distributed across four VDCs: Lete, Kowang, Kunjo and Tukuche.

Thak Satsae Area or Thak Khola is home to Tamang people, the largest group of Thakalis in Mustang, who are known to outsiders as just Thakkalis. The Thakkalis of Mustang, known for their enterprising skills as traders, innkeepers and hoteliers, are divided into four clans: Khuki (Bhattachan), Choki (Gauchan), Dinjen (Sherchan) and Salki (Tulachan). The introduction of horticulture and tourism has made this region prosperous. Various kinds of liquor, Jam and Jelly made up of apple, apricot and plum are very popular commodities of this area.

==== Panchgaon ====
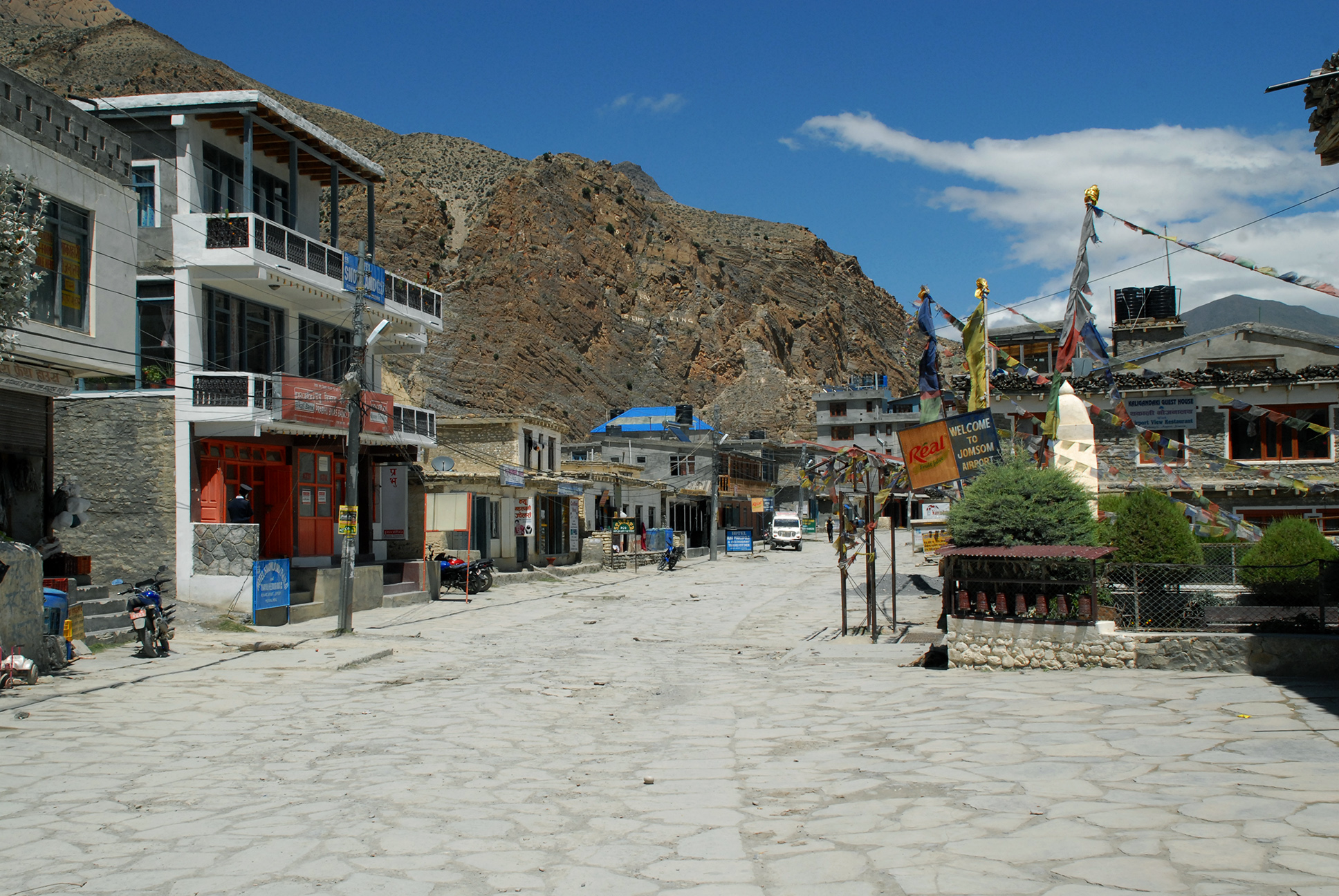
Jomsom main street, near the airport

Panchgaon ("five villages") lies between the trading town of Tukche and the pilgrimage site of Muktinath. Beyond the five villages — Marpha, Chhairo, Chimang, Syang and Thini — this area also includes more recent settlements such as Jomsom, Drumpa and Samle. All these settlements were distributed across two VDCs: Jomsom and Marpha. Jomsom is the district headquarter, Thini is historically one of the most significant sites in the entire district, and Marpha is very popular for the apple orchards and apple brandy. Panchgaon was once ruled by the king of Sum Garabdzong (or Sumpo Garabdzong, near present-day Thini), and the bem-chag records mainly deal with the foundation and boundaries of that kingdom. The village records or bem-chag kept in the five original villages including Thini, Syang, Marpha, Chairo and Cimang are one of the indispensable sources for the study of the history of the Mustang.

The dominant ethnic group is Thakali, also known as Panchgaonle ("people of Panchgaon"). People from Marpha, Chhairo and Chimang write clan names as their surname. The four clans are Hirachan, Lalchan, Jwarchan and Pannachan. But the people from Thini and Syang write their surname as only Thakali to identify by themselves. Among the villages of Panchgaon, Mawatan Thankalis are from Marpha and Yhulkasompaimhi, Yhulgasummi or Yhulgasumpa Thakalis are from Thini, Syang and Chimang. While more than 80 per cent of the Tamang Thakali are found outside Thak Khola, nearly half of the total Mawatan Thakali population still live in Marpha village. Thini village, one of the oldest Thakali villages in Thak Khola region does not categorise itself within Panchgaonle (people from Panchgaon), instead they categorise themselves within Tingaonle Thakali (people from three villages) which includes Thini, Syang and Chimang. According to the informants from Thini, they do not categorise those people who are originated from Marpha and Chhairo as original Thakali. They even do not have socio-religious relationships such as marriage and other local religious activities with Marpha and Chhairo.

==== Baragaon ====
Baragaon

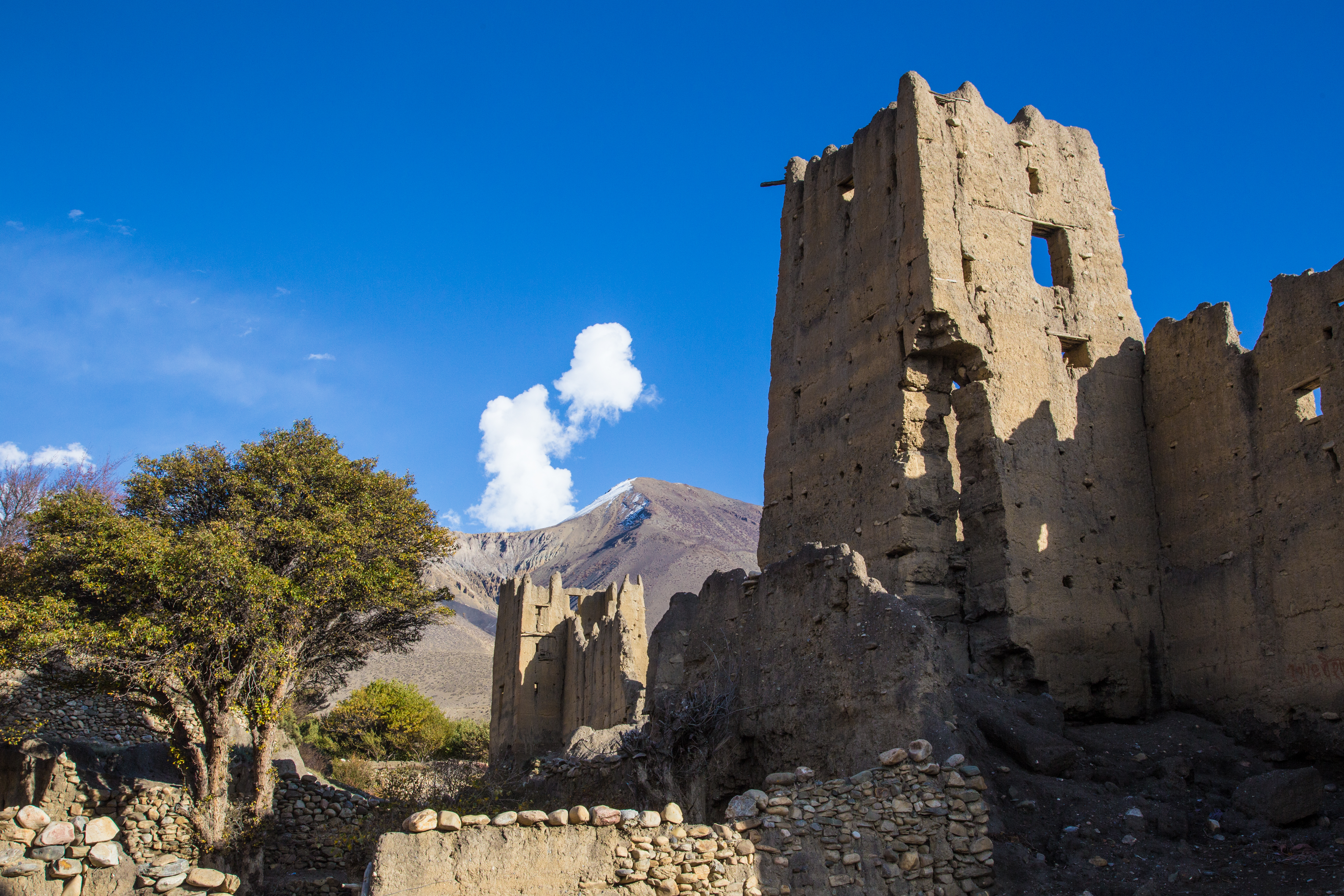
Ruins of ancient fortress in Tangbe village, Chhusang

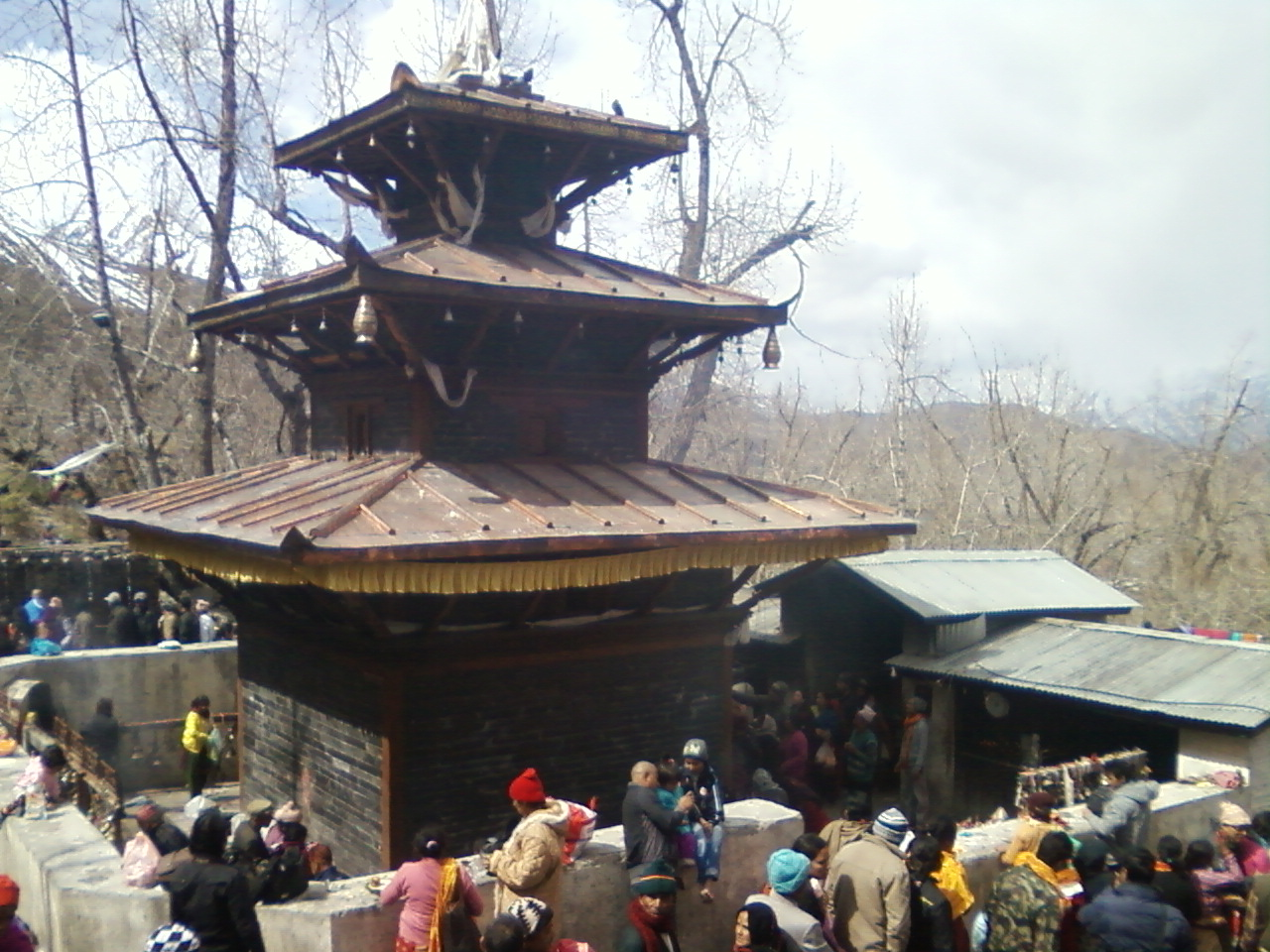
Muktinath temple

Baragaon ("Twelve Villages") is a northerly sub-region lying between Jomsom and the region of Lo, in and around the Muktinath Valley, extending from south of Ghilling to Lubra lying north of Jomsom. It is sometimes called Glo Bosmad ("Lower Lo"), as it shares many geographical features of Lo proper, with some parts falling inside Upper Mustang. The people who live are not categorised as Thakali. They are known to outsider as Bhotia ("Tibetan") or Baragaonle ("People of Baragaon") and they share cultural similarities with Lo, though they often use Gurung, Bista or Thakuri as their surname for purposes of status emulation.

This sub-region now consists of 19 main villages — Kagbeni, Khinga, Dakardzong, Jharkot, Muktinath, Chongur, Jhong, Putak, Purong, Lubra, Pagling, Phalek, Tiri, Chhusang, Tetang, Tangbe, Tsele, Ghyaga and Sammar. These villages were spread across four VDCs south of Lochhoden: Kagbeni, Muktinath, Jhong and Chhusang. The central town of Baragaon is Kagbeni, at the confluence of Muktinath or Dzong (Jhong) River and Kali Gandaki River. Kagbeni is on the well-traveled route to the pilgrimage site of Muktinath. Tibetan dialect (Pheke) prevails here, though the people of Tangbe, Chhusang, Tetang, Tsaile and Ghyaker also speak Seke, a language closely related to Thakali.

The Muktinath temple is located at an altitude of 3,710 meters near Ranipauwa village at the foot of the Thorong La mountain pass in Muktinath Valley. It is considered to be 106th among the available 108 Divya Desam (premium temples) considered sacred by the Sri Vaishnava sect. The ancient name of this place in Sri Vaishnava literature is Thiru Saligramam. The temple houses the Saligram shila, considered to be the naturally available form of the Hindu Godhead Sriman Narayan. It is also one of the 51 Shakta pithas. The Buddhists call it Chumig Gyatsa, which in Tibetan means "Hundred Waters". Although the temple has a Vaishnav origin, it is also revered in Buddhism. For Tibetan Buddhists, Muktinath is a very important place of dakinis, goddesses known as Sky Dancers, and one of the 24 Tantric places. They understand the murti to be a manifestation of Avalokiteśvara, who embodies the compassion of all Buddhas.

=== Lo Tsho Dyun ===
The people of restricted northern areas of Mustang are known as Lopa. But, they use surname like Bista and Gurung outside their lands. The restricted area, lying between Tibetan border and Ghemi village, encompasses the historic kingdom of Lo Tsho Dyun ("seven districts of Lo" in local Tibetan dialect of Loke). Lo Manthang is the only walled city of Nepal and it is also known as the cultural capital of this area. The palace and other structures within the wall were built by Ame Pal, the first king of Lo, during the period of the 15th century. His lineage is recognised as the royal family of Mustang. Lo Tsho Dyun area consists of Ghiling, Ghemi, Dhakmar, Marang, Tsarang, Dhi, Surkhang, Yara, Ghara, Tangya, Dhea, Lo Monthang, Nhenyol, Chhoser, Nyamdo, Kimaling, Thinkar, Phuwa and Namgyal villages. They were spread across six VDCs: Dhami, Charang, Lo Manthang, Chhoser, Chhonhup and Surkhang.

==== Lo Manthang ====
Walled city of Lo Manthang

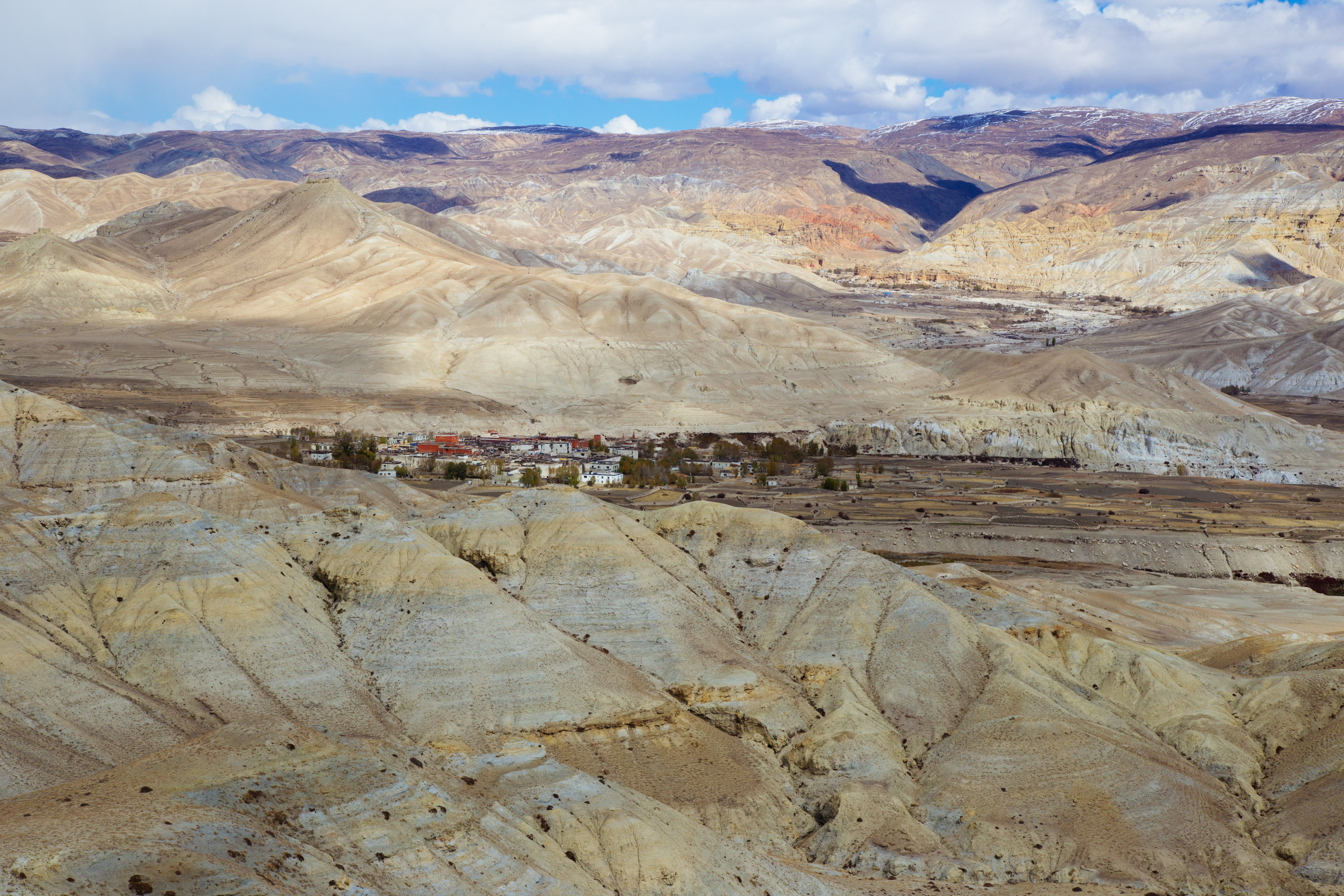
Surrounding terrain

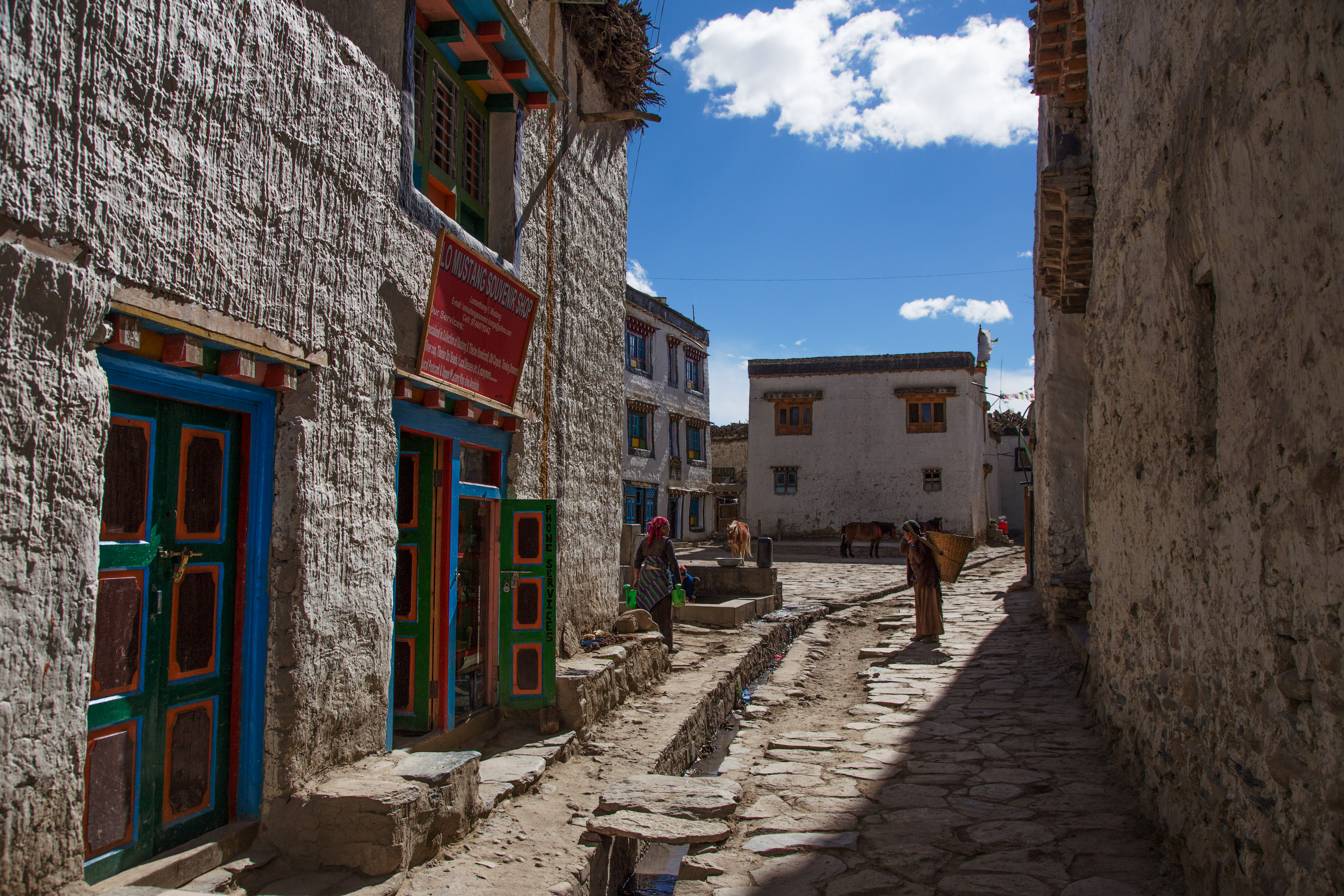
From inside

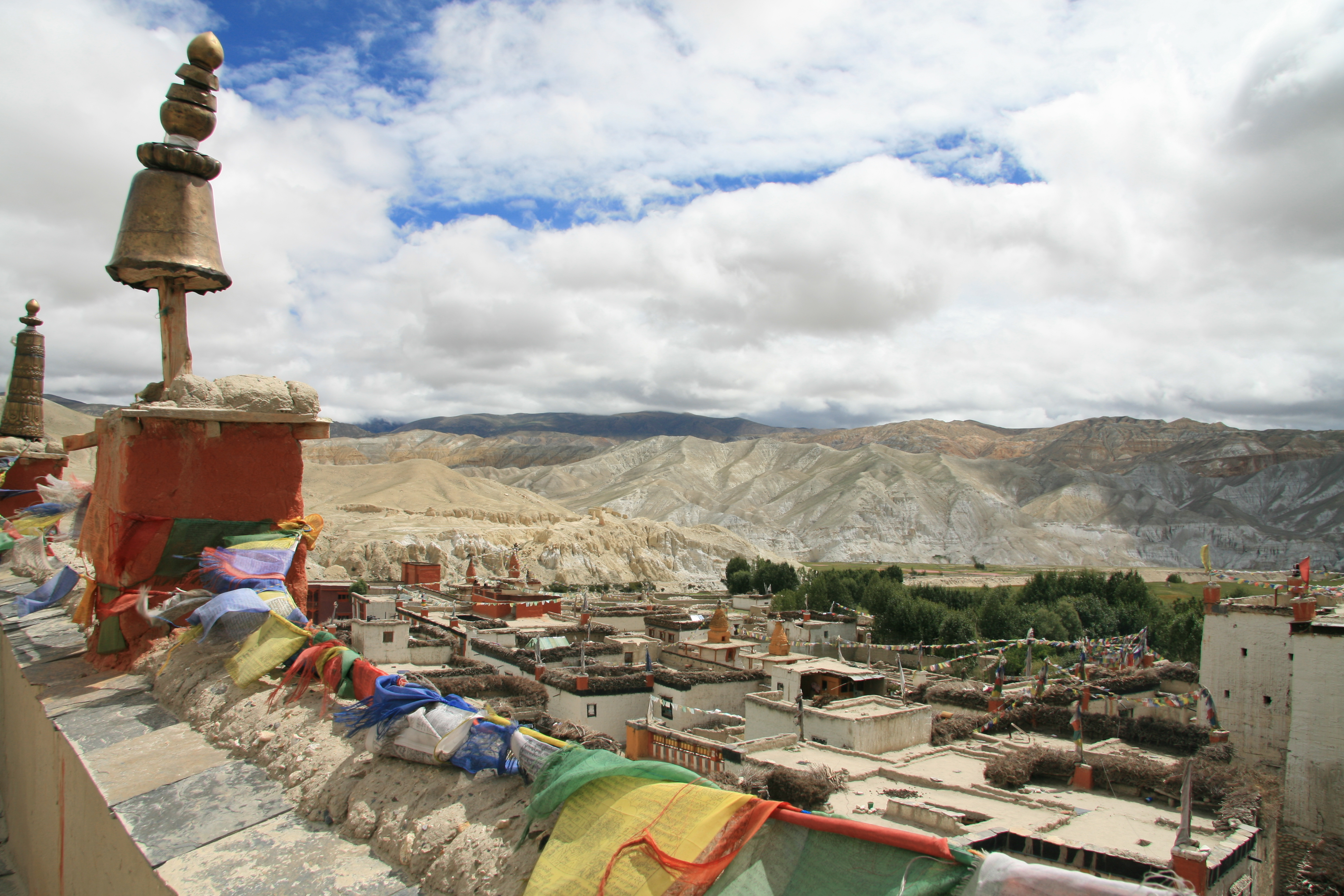
From rooftop

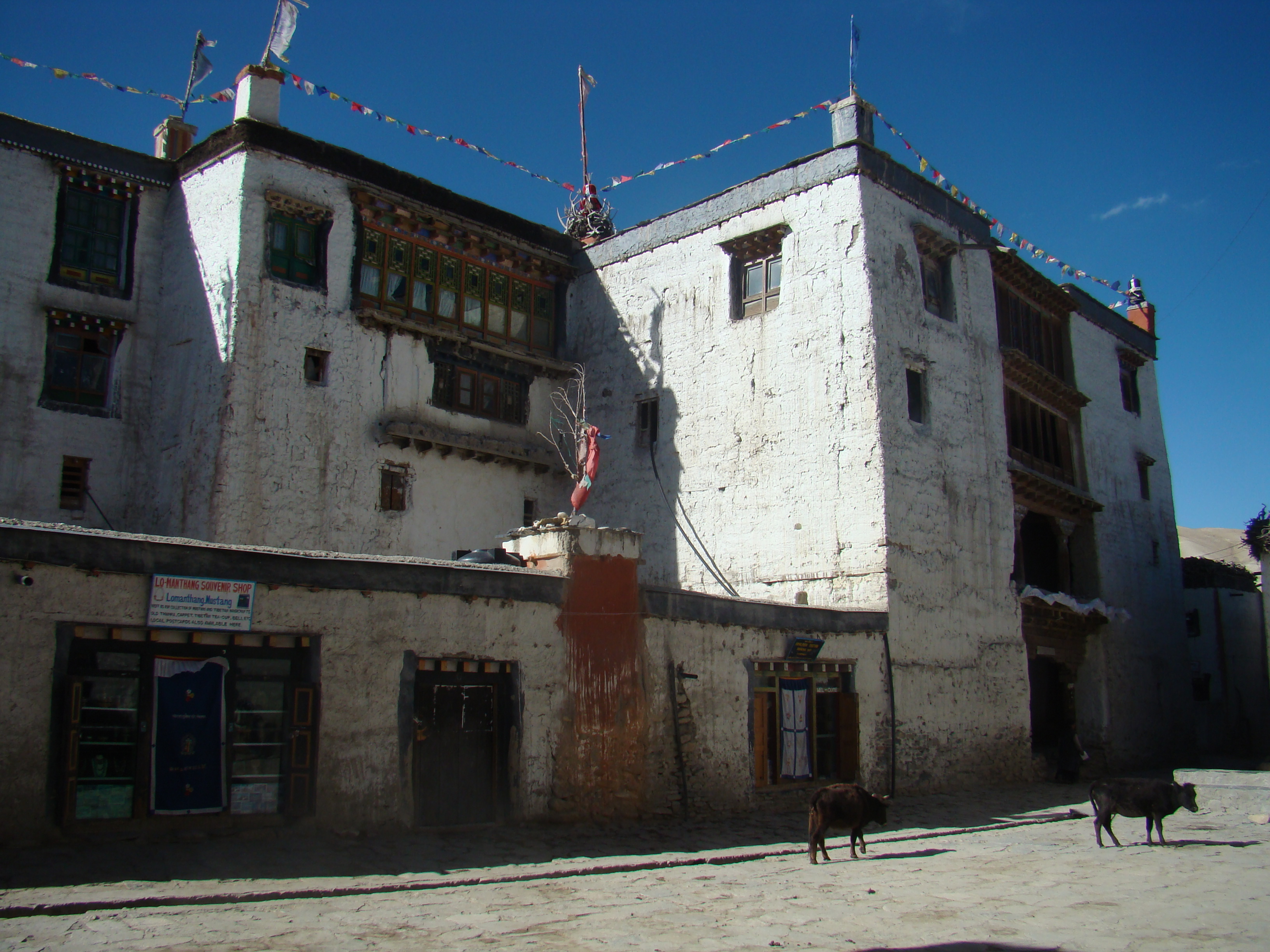
The Royal Palace

Lo Manthang, a Village Development Committee with 876 people living in 178 households, is the capital of the old kingdom of Lo, which encompasses the northern two thirds of the district and known as Upper Mustang. Though the capital of the district is Jomsom, the traditional Tibetan-style locales lie north of Kagbeni. The old capital Lo Manthang, a square-walled town on the Plain of Prayers, is the residence of the present king.

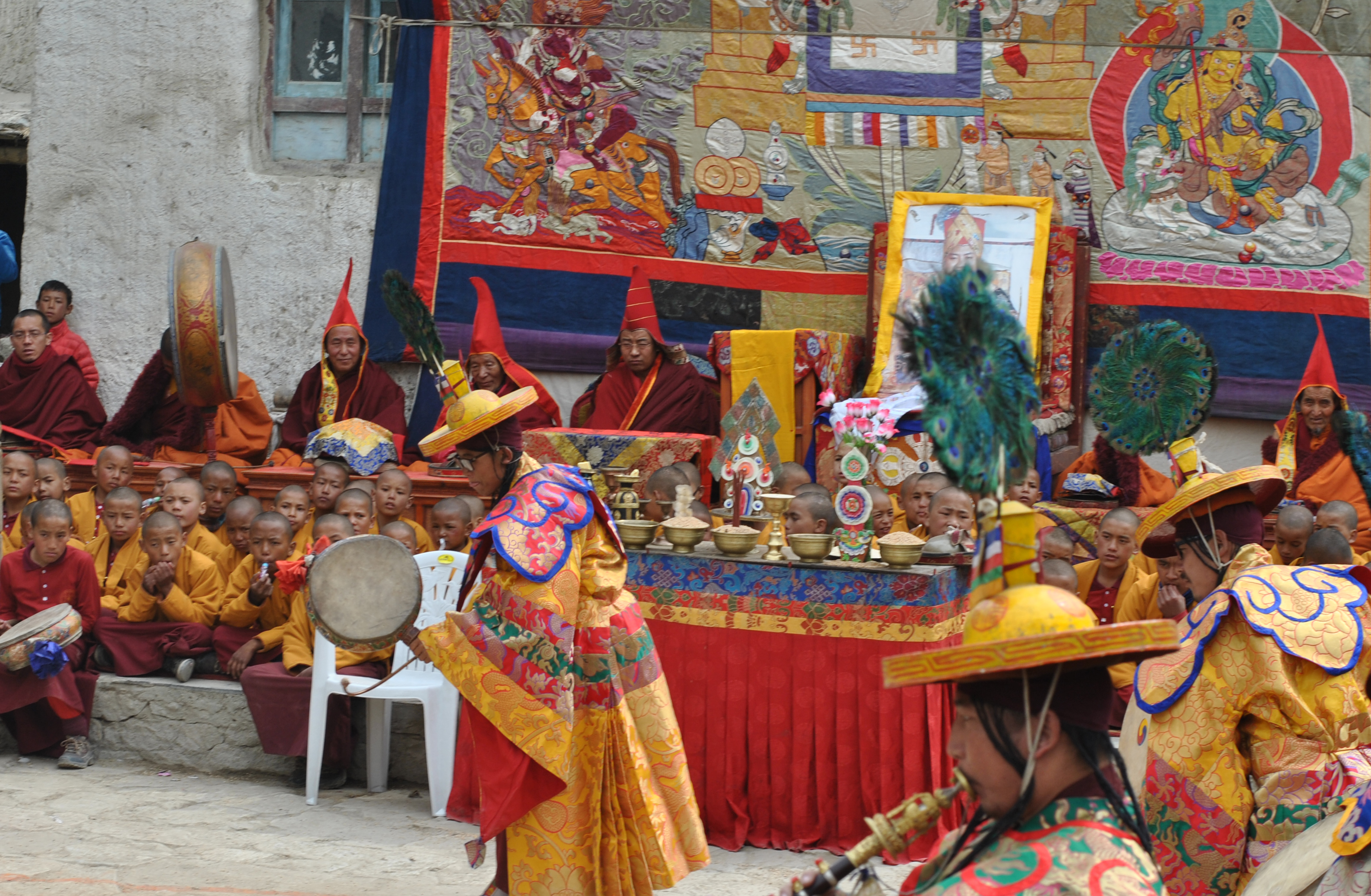
Tiji festival

Lo Monthang features the King's Palace and many monasteries that are being restored by art historians Europe. The village is noted for its tall white washed mud brick walls, gompas and the Raja's or Royal or King's Palace, a nine-cornered, five story structure built around 1400. There are four major temples: Jampa Lhakhang or Jampa Gompa, the oldest, built in the early 15th century and also known as the "God house"; Thubchen Gompa, a huge, red assembly hall and gompa built in the late 15th century and located just southwest of Jampa Gompa; Chodey Gompa, now the main city gompa; and the Choprang Gompa, which is popularly known as the "New Gompa". It is noted by scholars as one of the best preserved medieval fortresses and a candidate for UNESCO World Heritage status. The windswept and arid land around Lo Manthang, located at an altitude between 3000m and 3500m, is not suitable for agriculture at all. However, there are a number of small streams, where willows grow along with wheat, potatoes and barley. The most famous festival here is Tiji, which generally happens in April/May, with costumed lamas dancing in the village square for three days.

==== Lopa people ====
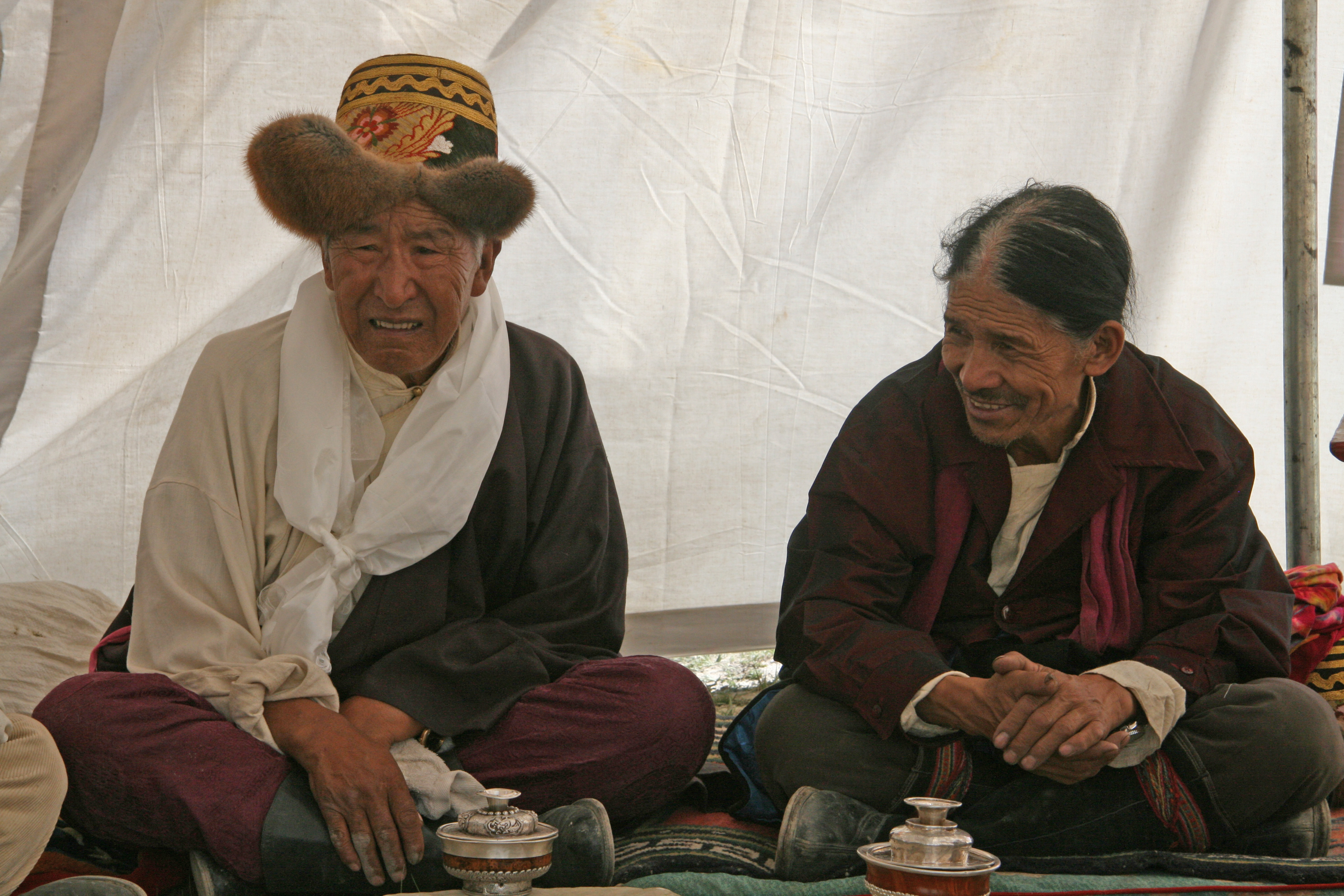
Lhopa men at Yartung, the biggest festival in Nepal's trans-Himalayan region that happens every September. Apart from the festivities it features popular horse-riding competitions that attract competitors from even the Nepalese Army.

Lo Manthang is the socio-cultural and political center of the ethnic Lopa people, the original inhabitants of Mustang. Their mud-brick homes are much like Tibetan homes, whitewashed outside and decorated inside. They build their homes out of stone, making the roofs out of thinly chiseled stone squares. The roofs are extremely uniform and smooth; and on each corner, a small square is constructed so that prayer flags may be hung there. Most houses are built close together and have no windows, only holes in the walls to protect against the high speed winds that race up the mountains. A Lopa home almost never built toward the South because of the fierceness of these winds. This is a drawback in summertime as the houses grow very hot due to a lack of appropriate ventilation. Hence, people often sleep on the terraces during the summer to escape the heat.

The Lopa are primarily farmers, shepherds, or merchants. Tibet traditionally traded with Lopas, but in mid-18th century salt-trade monopoly was awarded to the Thakali people to the south, stripping the Lopa of much income. In 1959, Tibetans started crossing the border and encroaching on the small plots of pastureland Lopas used to feed their sheep, yaks, donkeys and mules, causing Lopa wealth to deteriorate further.

Socially, they are divided into three groups, one of which contains those of royal heritage. Rules of society are based on the values of respect and honour. The structure of their families is also based on these and other traditions. They practice Tibetan Buddhism. Sometimes marriages are made by parental agreement, other times by capture or elopement. Like other people who live in harsh terrains, they are generous and kind, and also are shrewd businesspersons. One tradition says that the eldest son will inherit the family's property. When he does, the next son must become a Buddhist monk.

== Nature ==
Lower Kali Gandaki valley forms the border to demarcate east and west for the distribution of flora and fauna of Mustang. It is rich in both temperate and trans-Himalayan biodiversity with flora and fauna that are most common to those that are highly rare. Though biodiversity of Upper Mustang is comparatively well studied and documented, only limited information is available on biodiversity of Lower Mustang.

=== Fauna ===
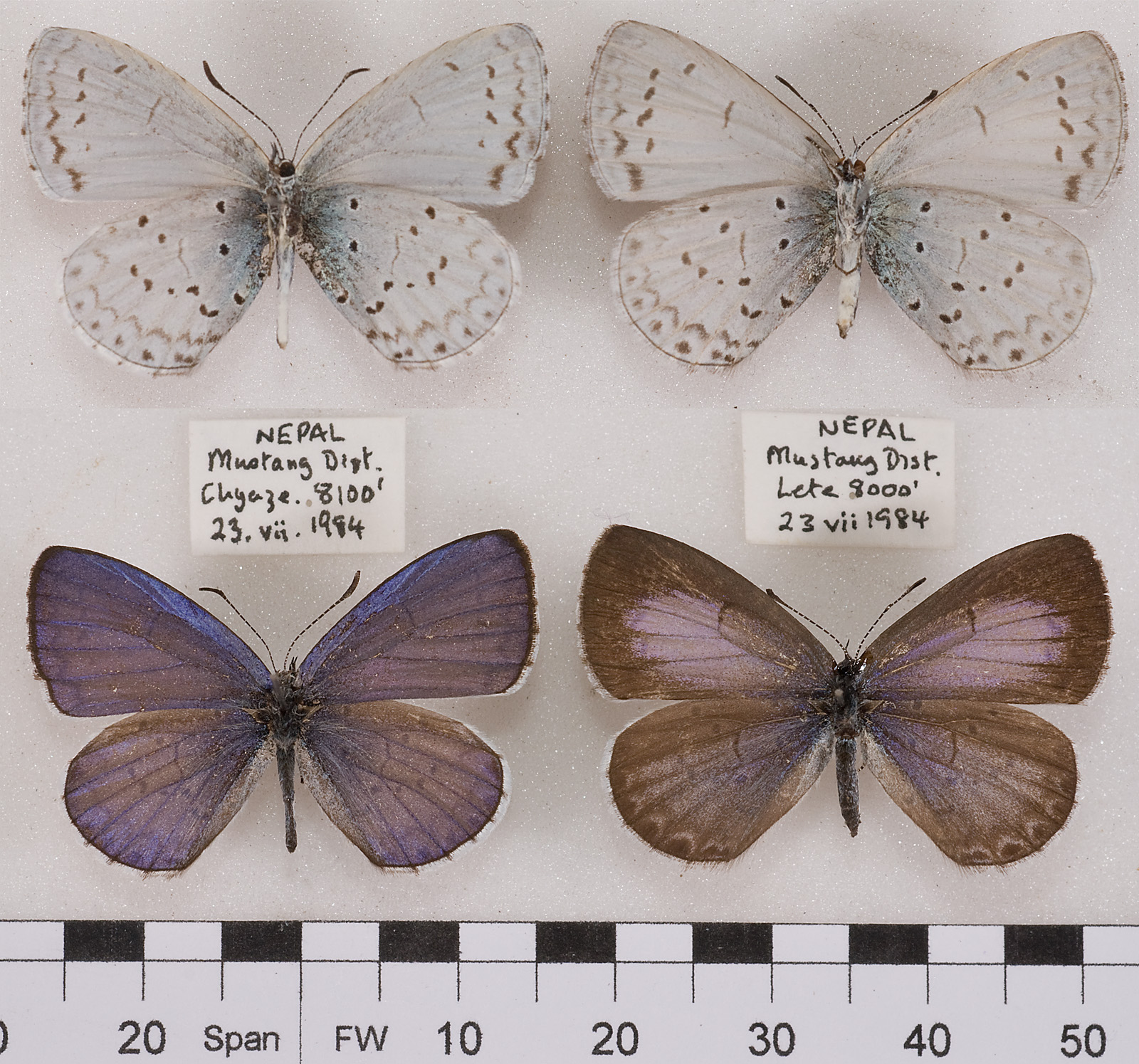
Celastrina huegeli specimen from Mustang

Mustang is rich in trans-Himalayan biodiversity, where five species of zooplankton, seven nematode species, two mollusc species, one annelid species, 25 insect species (seven aquatic insects and 18 butterfly species), one spider species, 11 amphibian species, eight lizard species, five snake species, 105 bird species and 29 mammal species have been recorded. Five butterfly species, extinct mollusc species (shaligram), two frog species, one reptile species, two bird species (Tibetan sandgrouse and Eurasian eagle-owl), and seven mammal species have only been recorded in Mustang in Nepal. Out of the 18 butterfly species recorded in Mustang, two are new and three are endemic to the area. Mustang is the habitat for snow leopard, musk deer, Tibetan wild ass and Tibetan gazelle. The only native fish species, recorded at 3475m above sea level at Ghami Khola stream in Dhami, has been identified as the highest elevation fish in Nepal. Six of the mammal species recorded from Mustang area are protected by the National Parks and Wildlife Conservation Act (1973), while seven of the mammal species are included in different threat categories of IUCN Red Data Book.

=== Flora ===
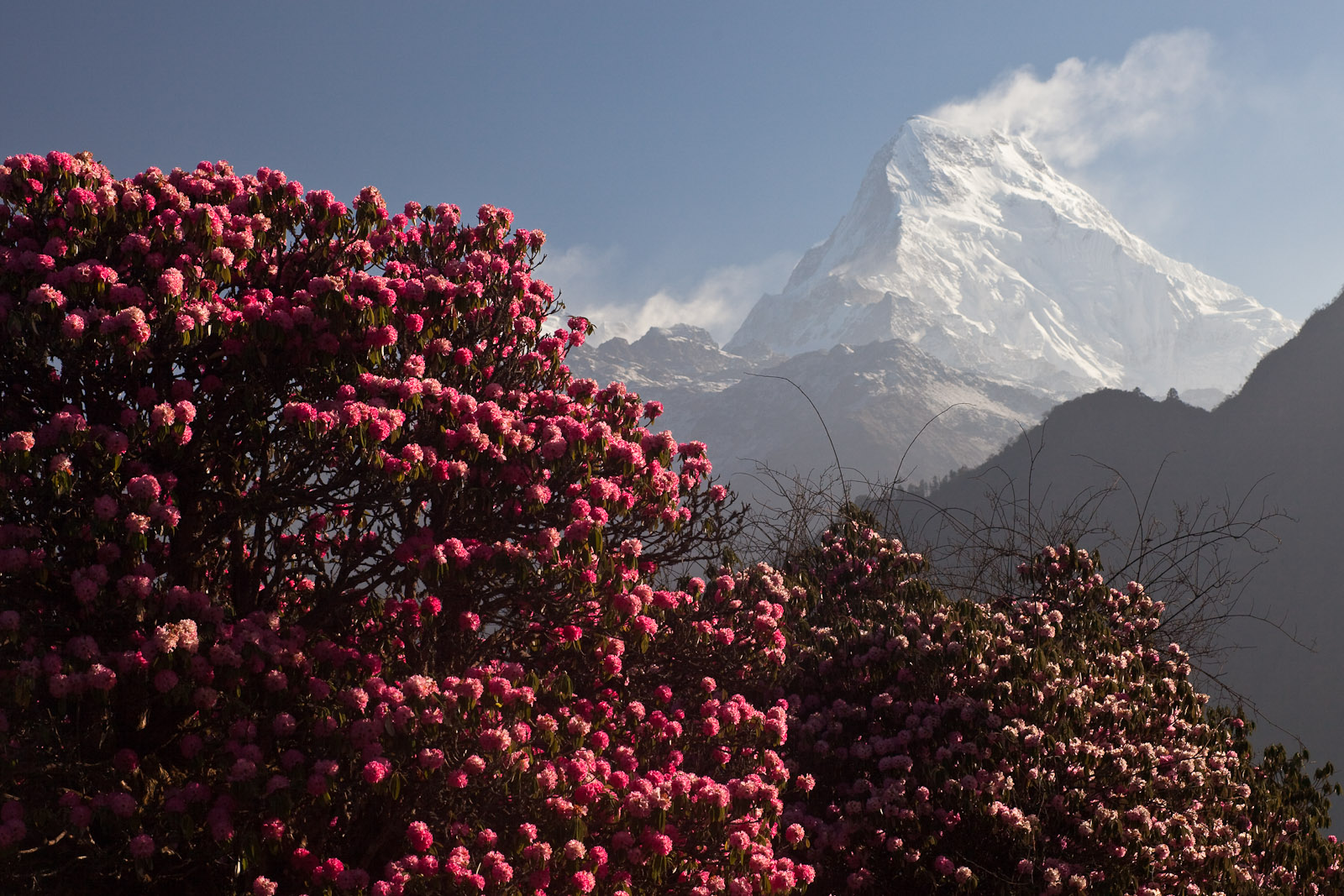
Rhododendrons in front of Annapurna South

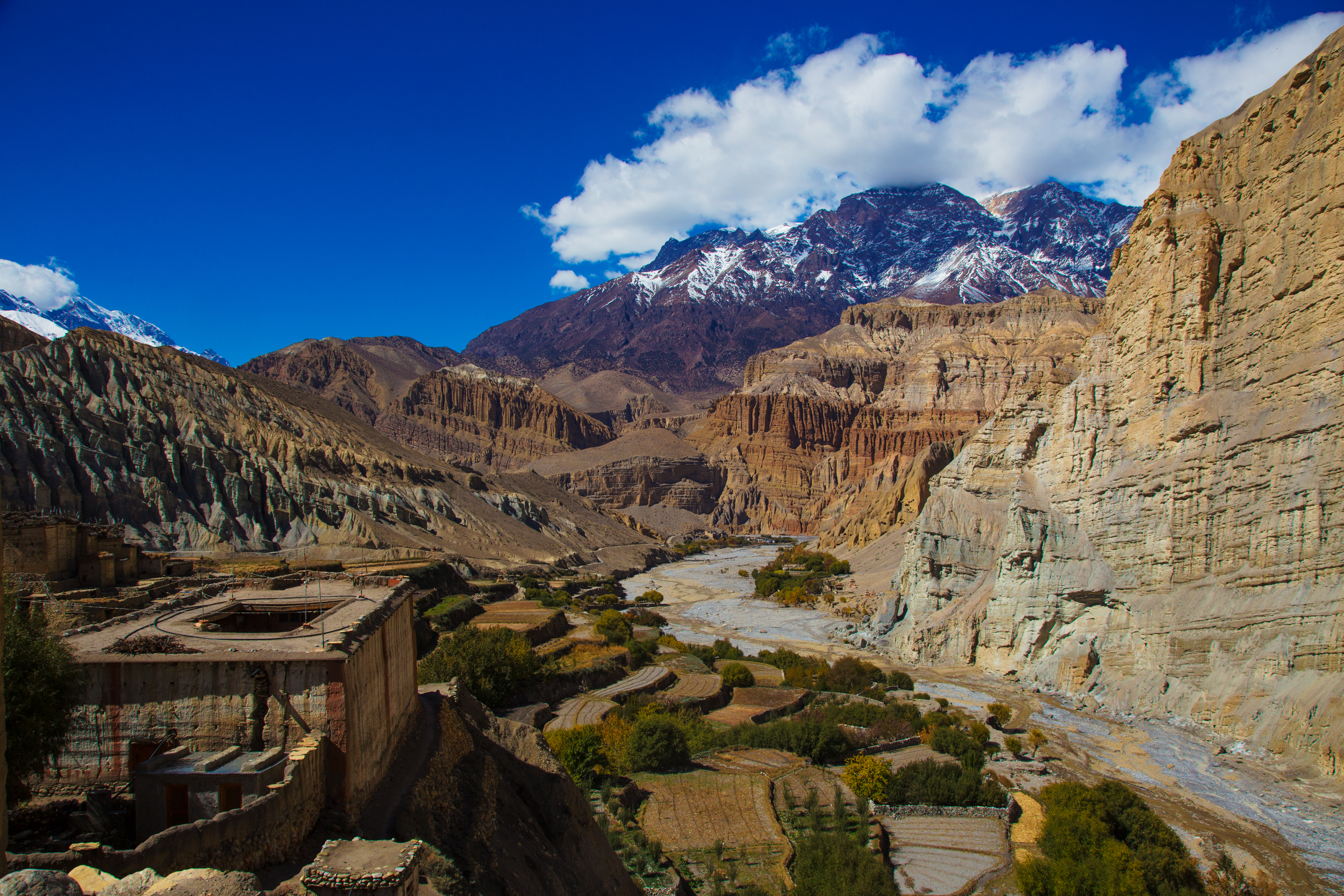
Terraced fields in Tetang village, Chhusang

Vegetation of Mustang District is of the steppe type and consists of grasslands interspersed with scrub. Cold desiccating winds, a short growing season, low precipitation and cold air temperatures limit the standing biomass produced from the steppe vegetation. Scrub is dominated by Juniperus squamata on gentle slopes, whereas steeper slopes are dominated by Caragana gerardiana, Chrysosphaerella brevispina, and Rosa sericea, as well various species of Ephedra and Lonicera. Vegetation above 5,000 metres consists mainly of Rhododendron anthopogon, as well as Potentilla biflora and various species of Saxifraga. Little or no vegetation is found above 5,800 metres.

Forest covers 3.24 per cent of Mustang's total landmass. Forest cover ends near Jomsom and is very limited in Upper Mustang, which falls in the Alpine climatic area. It is distributed over one small patch each in Lo Manthang and Dhami VDCs, and seven patches in Chhuksang VDC. The vegetation of the district can be categorised into some eight types, including six types of mixed forest identified by the dominant species — Pinus wallichiana, Betula utilis, Hippophae salicifolia, Caragana gerardiana, Lonicera spinosa and Caragana gerardiana, Juniperus — and grasslands/rangelands covered with Poaceae. Lower Mustang offers mixed broad leaved forest such as Acer species, conifers (mainly pine) and rhododendrons (Nepali: लालीगुँरास), and at the higher elevation conifers with birch Betula utilis.

Mustang is rich in medicinal and aromatic plants with very high economic and ethnomedicinal values. Local people use a number of plants for food, spices, fibre, medicine, fuel, dye, tannin, gum, resin, religious purposes, roofing materials, handicrafts, etc. Medicinal use of 121 plant species was recorded in a study. These 121 plants included 49 vascular plants and 2 fungi species from 92 genera. These plants, including different parts of the same plant, were used to treat 116 different ailments. The most common type of medicinal plants were herbs (73%), which was followed by shrubs, trees, and, finally, climbers. Over 200 species of Non-Timber Forest Products (NTFP) and medicinal and aromatic herbs (MAP) have been identified in Mustang. These plants were found to be used as medicine (50 species), food (33), fuel (27), fencing (24), fodder (19), ritual object (19), decoration (8), manure (7), dye/soap (3), psychoactive (3), and construction material (2 species).

== Demographics ==
Distribution of people by age

Historical population
Census year	Pop.	±% p.a.
1981	12,930	—
1991	14,292	+1.01%
2001	14,981	+0.47%
2011	13,452	−1.07%
2021	14,452	+0.72%
Source: Citypopulation

At the time of the 2021 Nepal census, Mustang District had a population of 14,452. 5.28% of the population is under 5 years of age. It has a literacy rate of 75.05% and a sex ratio of 822 females per 1000 males. The entire population lives in rural areas.

Castes/ethnic groups in Mustang district (2021)
1. Gurung (29.0%)
2. Thakali (13.6%)
3. Magar (11.7%)
4. Kami (10.8%)
5. Lhopa (8.49%)
6. Damai (5.65%)
7. Chhetri (4.92%)
8. Bahun (3.23%)
9. Tamang (2.49%)
10. Sherpa (1.60%)
11. Bhote (1.07%)
12. Dolpo (0.98%)
13. Other Hill Janjati (1.87%)
14. Others (4.58%)

Hill Janjatis make up 70% of the population. Khas people make up 26% of the population, of which Khas Dalits are 17% of the population.

Languages of Mustang district (2021)
1. Nepali (47.4%)
2. Lhopa (14.2%)
3. Baragunwa (10.6%)
4. Thakali (7.07%)
5. Tibetan (4.20%)
6. Gurung (3.13%)
7. Lowa (3.04%)
8. Magar (2.74%)
9. Tamang (1.56%)
10. Magar Kham (1.35%)
11. Others (4.73%)

At the time of the 2021 census, 47.35% of the population spoke Nepali, 14.20% Lhopa, 10.63% Baragunwa, 7.07% Thakali, 4.20% Tibetan, 3.13% Gurung, 3.04% Lowa, 2.74% Magar, 1.56% Tamang and 1.35% Magar Kham as their first language. In 2011, 39.4% of the population spoke Nepali as their first language.

Religion in Mustang District (2021)
Religion	Percent
Buddhism	58.59%
Hinduism	38.14%
Christianity	1.88%
Bon	1.11%
Other or not stated	0.28%

According to demographic data published by Population and Housing Census 2011 (National Report), 13,452 people lived in Mustang spread across an area of 3,573 km^{2} (1,380 sq mi), making it the second least populated district and, with a population density of 4 per km^{2}, also the second least densely populated district. 7,093 or them were male, and 6,359 were female.

Age of first marriage for Mustang people are varied: 15–19 Years 1,603, 20–24 Years 3,016, 25–29 Years 1,677, and others 1,030 (total married 7,326).

According to the 1992 Census, the total population of the district was 14,319, not including temporary residents such as government and army officials, police, development workers, and Tibetan refugees.

The district is divided into Upper and Lower Mustang. The northern two-thirds of the district (Upper Mustang or former Lo Kingdom) is home to the Lhopas, a Bhotay (Tibetan) people, where Tibetan language and culture prevails. The southern third, the Thak, is the homeland of Thakali people who speak Thakali dialects and have a synthesis of Tibetan and Nepalese culture. The main languages spoken are Bhote (Gurung) and Nepali. Inhabitants of mid-Mustang of Baragaon speak both Tibetan and a language similar to Thakali.

== Health ==
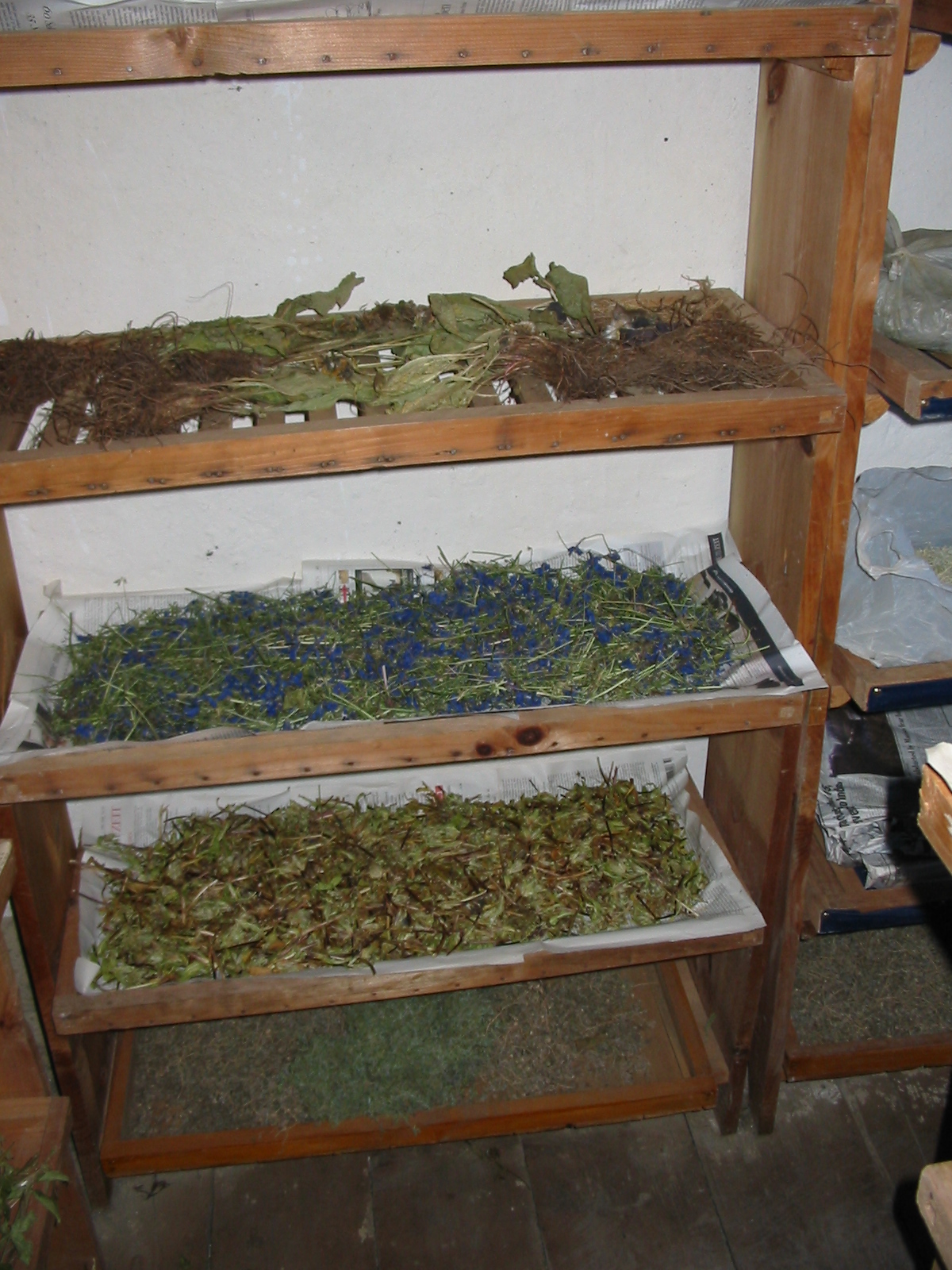
Drying medicinal plants in Jharkot, Muktinath

For 14,981 people Mustang District had a total of 17 health posts, with a health post to population ration of 1:881. While that is better than the national average of 1:5663, these posts cannot be easily accessed because of the remoteness of locations and ruggedness of terrain. There are 10 health posts and five sub health posts scattered throughout Lete, Kobang, Tukche, Marpha, Eklebhatti, Jarkot, Kagbeni and Chame. Jomsom has the only hospital.

Because of low access to facilities and other socio-cultural factors, for most people in Mustang, traditional herbal medicines are the popular mode of medical care and Amchis (traditional Tibetan healers) are the local medical experts. Local Amchis use 72 species of medicinal plants to treat 43 human ailments. They use different forms of medication including pastes (60 species), powders (48), decoctions (35), tablets (7), pills (5), cold infusions (5), and others means, administered through oral, nasal, topical and other routes. Most people here have deep faith in the Amchis.

Amchis have a unique method of maintaining quality of the medicine. They collect medicinal plants always on their own, because only they have experience extensive enough to identify the right plants. Also, only an Amchi knows when to collect the plants, as the timing, while very important in capturing active principles of the plants, varies by days, even months.

Then they store their herbs in bags made from the skin of Moschus chrysogaster (Himalayan musk deer), tied twice with a thread. Tying a herb in musk deer skin helps it, according to Amchis, to remain effective for a couple of years. Horn and urine of musk deer and tortoise bones, as well as parts of other animal are also used along with plant parts.

They use a stone slab to grind their medicine, because they believe the heat created by an electric grinder would degrade the active principles of the plant powder, reducing its quality. Powdered ingredients are then mixed with water. Sufficient amount of additives are also added. Plant parts are commonly prepared using water, hot or cold, as the solvent (100 species), but occasionally remedies are prepared with milk (14 species), honey (2), jaggery or Indian cane sugar (2), ghee or Indian clarified butter (2) and oil (1) in preparing pills in round or rectangular shapes. The mix is then boiled until water is completely evaporated making it easy to shape the pills.

== Education ==
The literacy rate in Mustang District is high. The pace of development started late in Mustang District, including the communication and transportation. Schools in the district are operated largely by non-government groups on private support, with negligible state involvement. Text books are transported by mules to reach remote villages, which as a result arrive late. Most teachers, hired on contract, are unable to hold a conversation in the supposed language of instruction, the mother tongue of the students. The curricula developed with European funding is largely unfamiliar to government teachers. The district school superintendent also does not visit these areas regularly because of their remoteness. The total population aged 5 years & above in Mustang is 12,588, of whom 8,334 (66.20%) can read & write, 305 (2.42%) can only read and 3,945 (31.33%) can neither read nor write.

Out of a total 8,451 literate people 275 were beginners, 3,650 primary (1-5), 1,631 lower secondary (6 -8), 721 secondary (9 -10), 836 SLC & equivalent, 509 intermediate & equivalent, graduate & equivalent 208, post graduate equivalent & above 51, Others 73, Non-formal education 471, Not stated 26. In 2017, Most of the students in Mustang were not in an age-appropriate class and did not progress to higher education. Education has improved dramatically in the past two decades in Upper Mustang, and some schools supported by international charities are better than many public schools in rural Nepal, although it is uncertain if the schools can sustainable.

A total of 768 people had SLC or higher education in 2011. Of them 164 studied Humanities and Arts, 170 studied Business and Administration, 167 Education, 43 Social & Behavioral Science, 47 Science, 13 Engineering, Manufacturing and Construction, 12 Health, 11 Agriculture, Forestry & Fishery, 9 Mathematics and Statistics, 8 Law, 3 Computing, and 1 Journalism and Information. 120 did not state their academic stream in the 2011 census. In 2017, Nepal Fine Arts Academy recently organised an art workshop for students of Mustang District in Jomsom.

== Economy ==
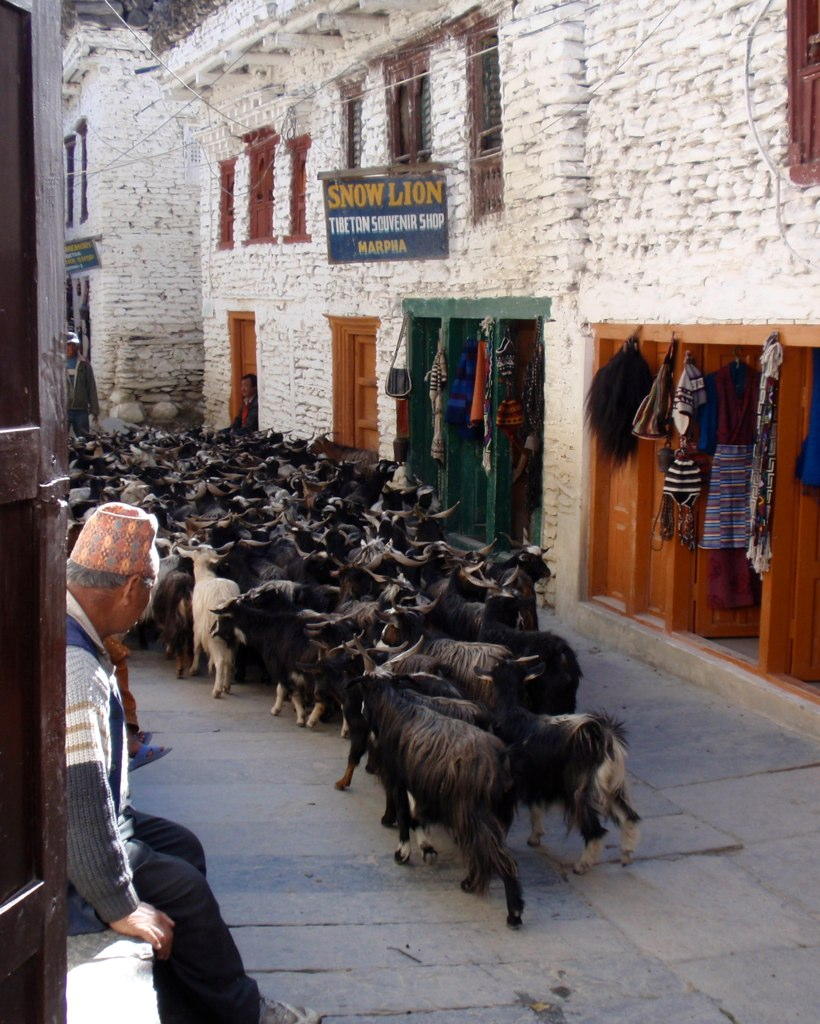
Goats in Marpha

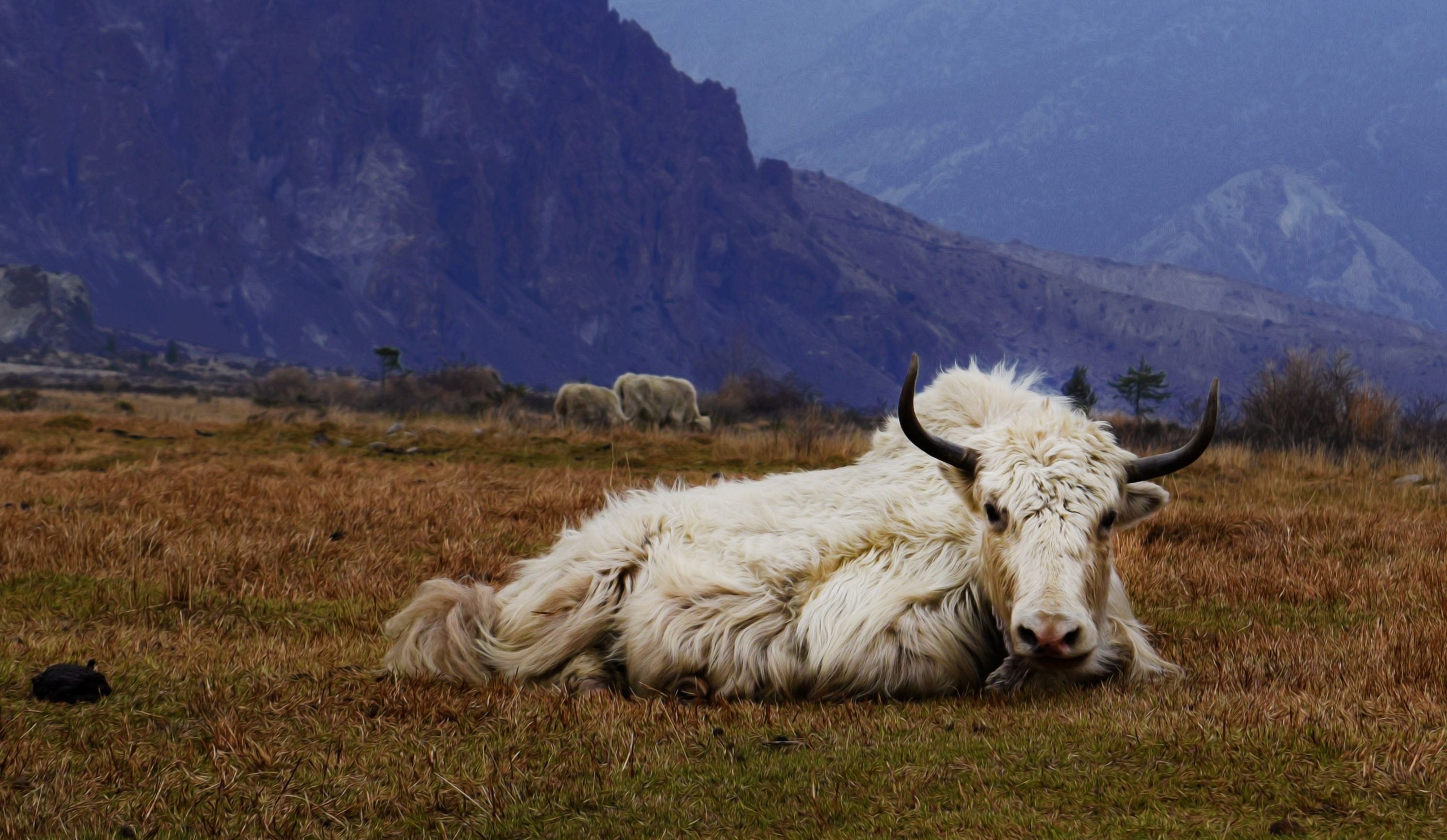
Yaks in Mustang

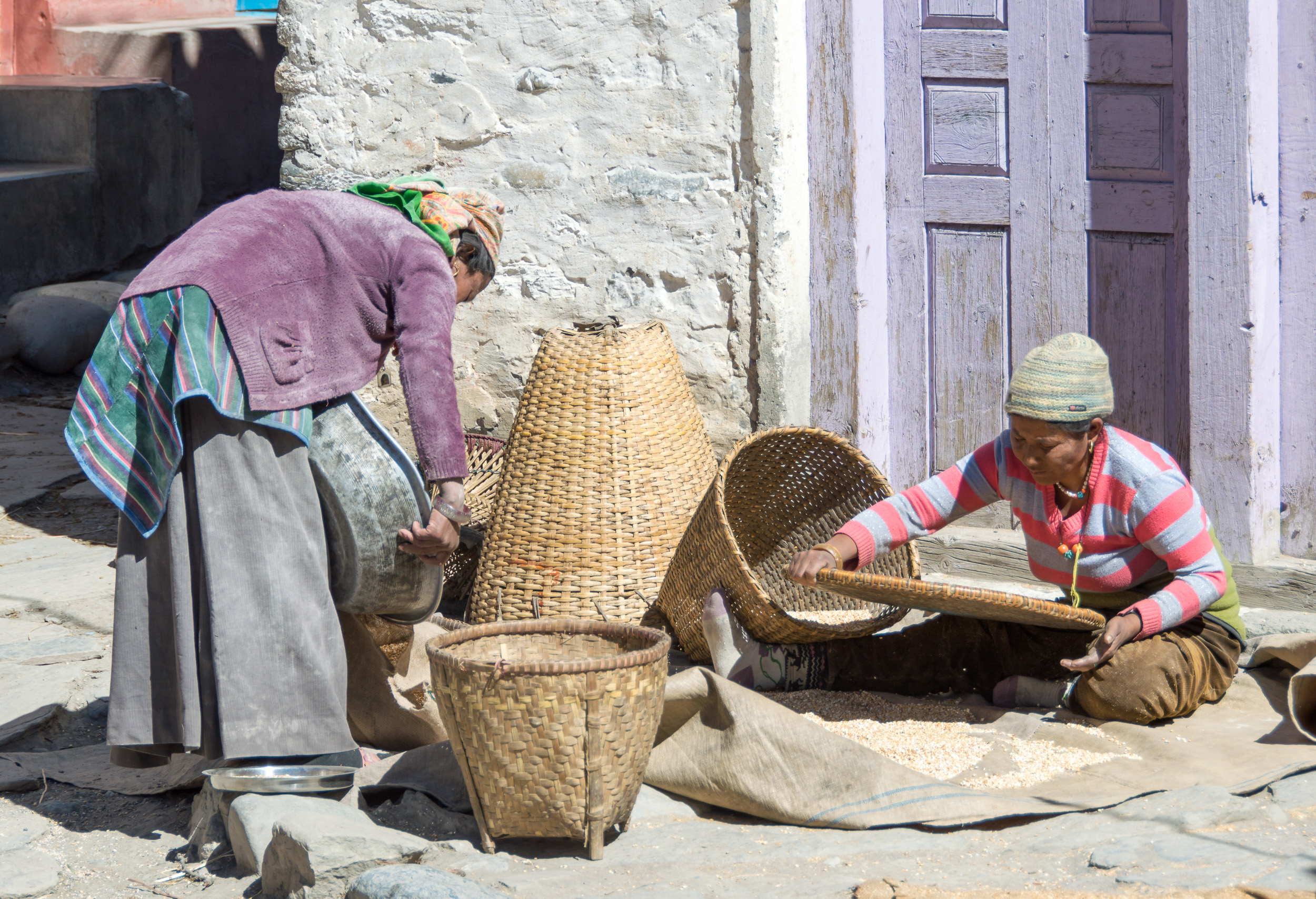
Chaffing grain in Kagbeni

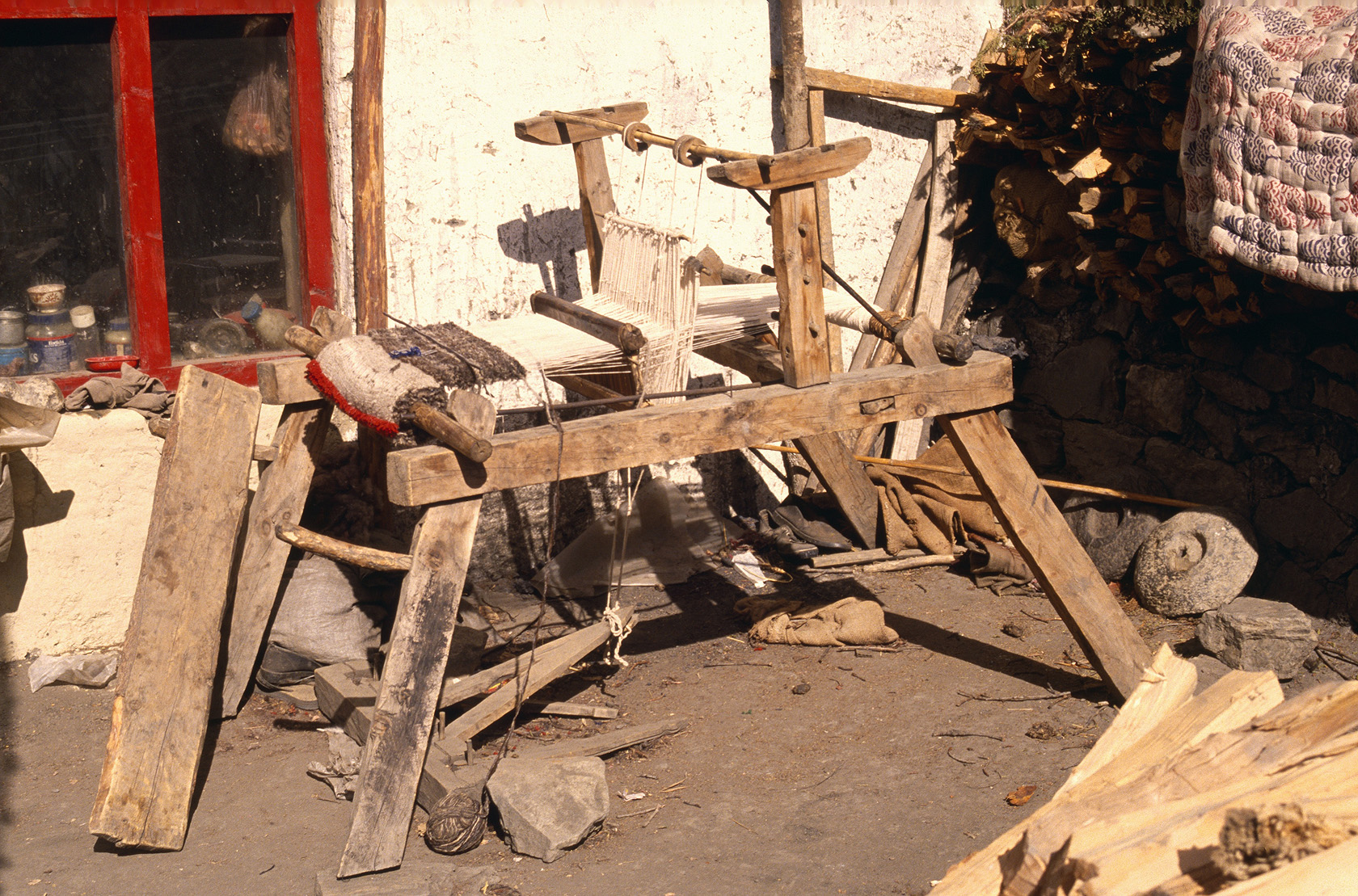
Loom in Muktinath

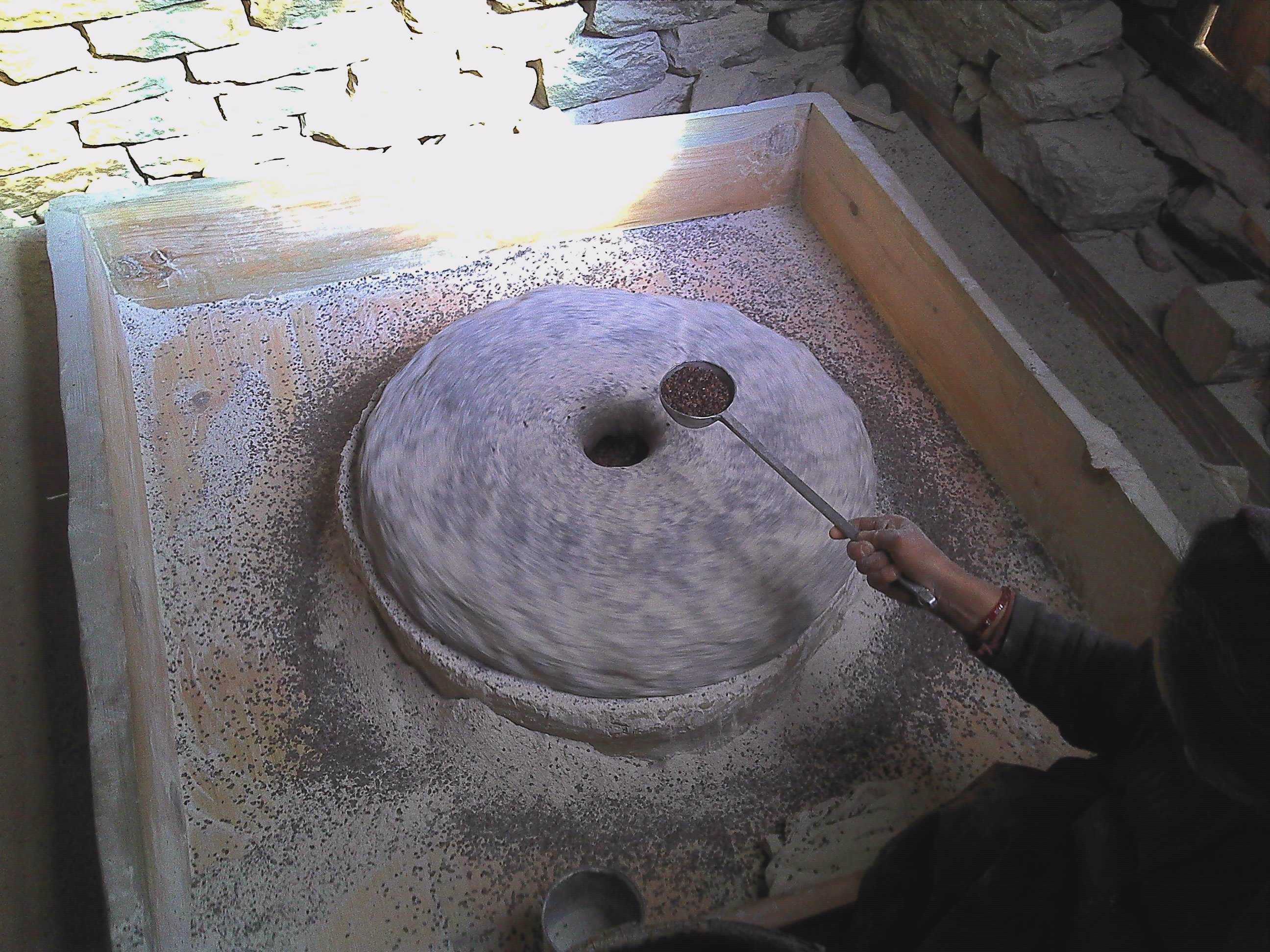
Pani ghatta in Jomsom

Mustang was an important route of crossing the Himalayas between Tibet and Nepal. Many salt caravans travelled through Mustang in the old times. Once a major thoroughfare for the trade of salt and grain between Tibet and Nepal's southern hills, the Mustang District in Nepal's western Himalayas remains a trading route to this day. For centuries, caravans travelled along the Kali Gandaki river trading salt, yak wool, cereals, dried meat spices and more in Tibet, China and India. and the Kali Gandaki gorge was used as a trade route between India and Tibet for centuries. The mountain pass of Kora La is one of the oldest routes between the two regions. It was historically used for salt trade between Tibet and Nepalese kingdoms. The border was closed in the 1960s. However, a semiannual cross-border trade fair remained, during which the border was open to local traders. In 2012, Nepal and China agreed to open 6 more official border crossings, Kora La being one of them.

Kora La has been an active vehicle border crossing between China and Nepal since 2023. Upper Mustang is highly dependent on Chinese imports: during the COVID-19 pandemic, prices of consumer goods increased three-fold as the border was closed. Nepal is expecting to regain some of the strategic importance of Mustang with the construction of the road to connect China with Nepal through Mustang. The road is expected to become a highly accessible Himalayan corridor and the district is expected to change significantly. There also is a fear of losing the culture and identity of the region.

Agriculture is the dominant economic activity in the district in which 80.65 per cent people are engaged in the district. People of Mustang are engaged in a traditional form of agro-pastoralist economy common to the mountainous regions of Nepal. Business (6.82%), government service (1.91%), house work (3.50%), foreign employment (3.97%) and others (3.14%) are others occupation types besides agriculture.

Many people in Mustang depend on sheep and mountain goat rearing for livelihood. Some of the points of attraction of animal husbandry are: access to pastureland, proximity to the Kora La border pass, and favourable market prices, as well as and technical help and subsidy from District Livestock Services Office. Yak-cow hybrids (called jhopa, or dzo) are employed as draft animals. Horses are reared largely for transport. In 2016, Mustang earned Nepalese rupee 270 million by exporting 13,000 sheep and 9,000 mountain goats. In 2017, the district supplied at least 25,000 sheep and mountain goats to different markets of Nepal during the Dashain festival. An estimated number of 9,000 mountain goats assumed as imported from Tibet in 2017, though traditional Tibetan traders are increasingly prioritising Chinese markets.

In the summer, goats, cows and sheep are grazed daily in herds in local alpine meadows. During the winter they are stall-fed with leaves, grass and crop wastes, cut and stored in the growing season as preparation for winter. The livestock provides the manure essential to maintain soil fertility, and thus is a significant link in the local agro-pastoral farming-system. Inorganic fertilisers or pesticides are not used.

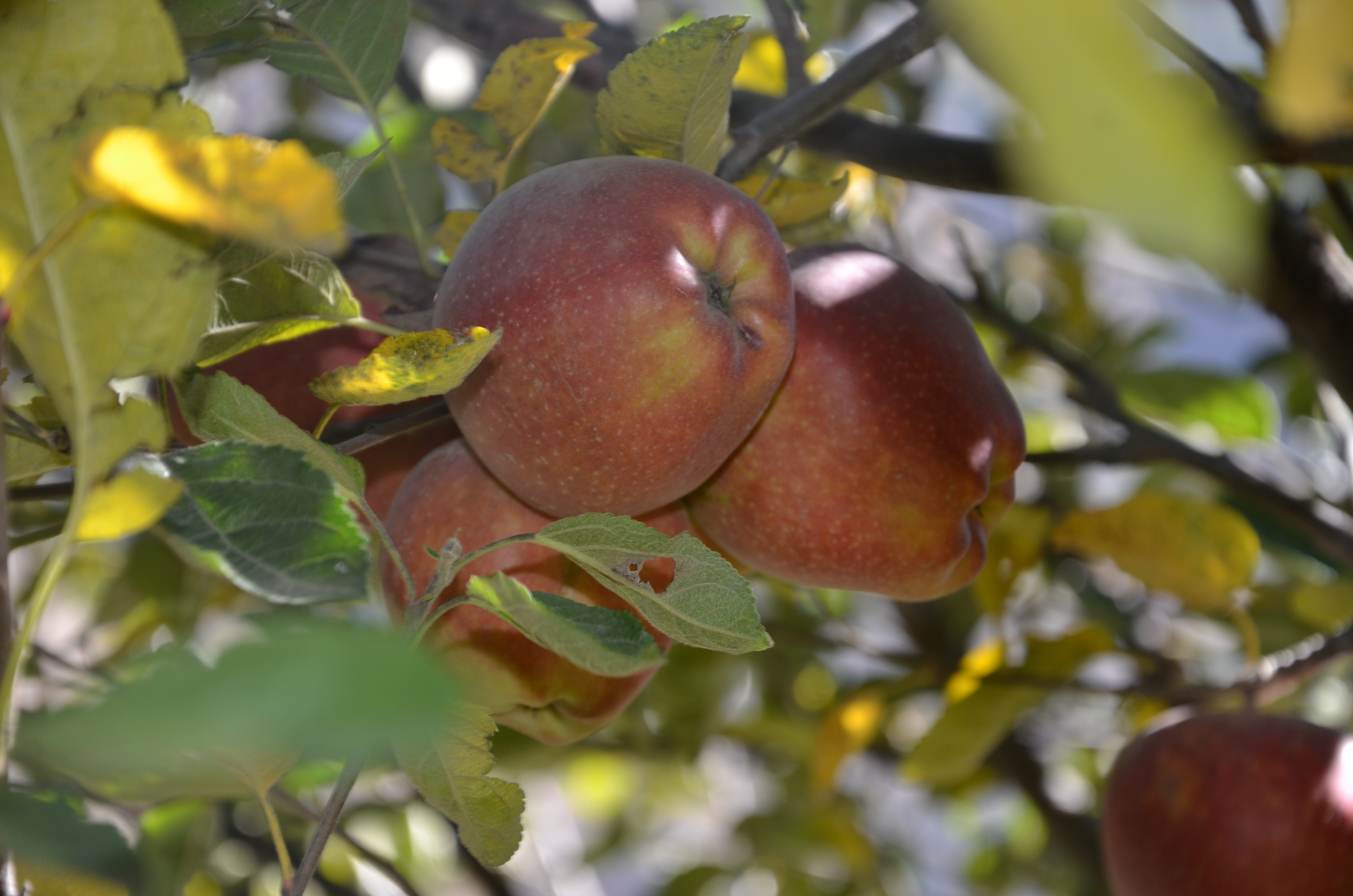
Mustang Apple at Marpha

Mustang is sometimes called the capital of apples in Nepal. District Agriculture Development Office (DADO) reports that despite the fact that a total of 1,115 hectares of land is considered suitable for apple-farming in Mustang, apple is planted in only 415 hectares of land. Mustang produced 5,300 tons of apples in 2017, an increase by 800 tons over 2016. Price of apples also increased in 2017. In 2016, apples were sold at Nepalese rupee 80 which had reached रु 100 in 2017. Barley, wheat and buckwheat are grown in terraced farms, while vegetables and fruits are grown in orchards. At Mebrak and Phudzeling sites of Upper Mustang, there is evidence of cultivation of buckwheat, naked barley, cannabis, lentils and other crops dated between 1000 and 400 BCE. In Kohla, there is evidence of cultivation of barley, free-threshing wheat, foxtail millet, buckwheat and oats dated 1385–780 BCE.

Though agro-pastoralism still provides the socio-economic backbone of Mustang, alternative livelihood like tourism, transport and labour migration are now emerging along agro-pastoralism. As a result, many has abandoned agriculture or animal husbandry as source of livelihood generally in Mustang and neighbouring district of Manag, and specifically in Jharkot, over the last couple of decades. Both number of people living in the district, their animal herds and the number of large households in a village are down from before. In Muktinath VDC the number of households came down to 169 from a high of 216 in 2001. Though agro-pastoralism still provides the economic and social backbone of Mustang, many of the terraced fields are now abandoned.

== Living and lifestyle ==
Building material

Following are distribution of households by building material:

- By foundation material: Mud bonded bricks/stone 3,097, Cement bonded bricks/stone 146, RCC with pillar 3, Wooden pillar 31, Others 7, Not stated 21
- By inner wall material: Mud bonded bricks/stone 2,366, Cement bonded bricks/stone 303, Wood/planks 29, Bamboo 9, Unbaked brick 565, Others 10, Not stated 23
- By roof material: Thatch/straw 31, Galvanized iron 192, Tile/slate 83, RCC 26, Wood/planks 20, Mud 2,902, Others 23, Not stated 28
- By toilet type: Without toilet 1,211, Flush toilet 1,382, Ordinary toilet 696, Not stated 16

— National Population and Housing Census 2011 (National Report)
Tenancy and ownership

Following are distribution of households by amenities:

- By tenancy: Owned 2,278, Rented 706, Institutional 182, Others 139)
- By ownership: Both house & land 266, Land only 118, Neither house nor land 2,911
- By size: One person 465, Two persons 610, Three persons 744, Four persons 602, Five persons 434, Six persons 280, Seven/eight persons 120; Nine or more persons 99

— National Population and Housing Census 2011 (National Report)

People in the district are mostly holds small housing units for dwelling. According to demographic data published by Population and Housing Census 2011 (National Report), Mustang had 3,305 households in the district, second lowest in Nepal, with an average household size of 4.01.

Improved transportation has brought many changes to Upper Mustang. According to GMA News Online, "Kerosene lamps have given way to solar panels, denim sneakers have replaced hand-stitched cowhide boots and satellite dishes are taking over the rooftops of homes," and the local Lopa people are "swapping handspun Tibetan robes for made-in-China jeans."

When government-owned Nepal Television first came to Upper Mustang in 2007, people used to pay 20 rupees (18 cents) for a three-hour sitting in someone's house. In 2011, 1,033 households had cable television, 1,237 households had radio, and 451 had television without a cable connection. 101 households had computers, 48 had internet, 240 had telephones, and 2,353 households had mobile phones. 89 households had motor vehicles, 224 had motorcycles, 9 had bicycles, and 455 had other vehicle (i.e. animal-drawn or human-drawn vehicles). 202 households had refrigerators. There are seven police stations established in Nechung, Thinkar, Kagbeni, Phedi, Jomsom, Ghasa and Lete. Jharkot and Jhong has post offices, while there is a bank, an airport and Nepalese Army's High Altitude and Mountain Warfare School in Jomsom.

More than 91.65 per cent population of the district is benefited by secured drinking water supply whereas 8.35 per cent population of the district is unsecured. Tap/pipe water are considered as secured system of water supply. In Mustang District 3029 households use tap/pipes, 174 using river/streams, 76 households use spout water, and 9 households using wells/kuwas.

== Energy ==
Mustang District is not much facilitated by the National Electricity Grid. So, alternate sources of energy are mostly used in this district. In the past, diyalo (heartwood) and pine wood were mostly used for illuminating homes, but now other methods like iron stoves, solar water heating systems, back-boilers, smoke water heaters, etc. have taken increasingly being popular. Fire wood, Cow dung, LP gas are the main fuel used as domestic source of energy in rural areas of Mustang District. About 54.01 per cent households apply wood/firewood as the domestic energy for cooking purposes. Cow dung is used by 24.99 per cent households. Most of the businesses and hotels of the district use LP gas (18.12%) as cooking fuel. Local people collect firewood mostly from the forest.

1,785 households in Mustang use wood or firewood as cooking fuel, 52 households use kerosene, 599 households use LP gas, 826 households use cow dung, 24 use electricity, while cooking fuel of 19 households are unknown. As lighting fuel, 3,177 use electricity (including 824 solar electricity using households), 71 use kerosene, while 39 households did not report their lighting fuel. The lower part of Mustang has recently been connected to the National Electricity Grid. This project is attempting to connect Upper Mustang too. Right now, most of the households of Upper Mustang benefit from micro-hydro projects. But, these projects can only be operated for about 6–7 months due to freezing of rivers in winter. The VDCs facilitated with electricity from National grid are Kunjo, Lete, Kobang, Tukuchhe, Marpha, Jomsom, Kagbeni, Mukthinath and Jhong. A sub-station of 504 Kilowatts has been established in Kobang.

For lighting, hydro-electricity is widely used by the rural population. Nearly 71.20 per cent households depend on electricity for light. Areas within southern VDCs - Kunjo, Lete, Kobang, Tukuche, Marpha and Jomsom- are connected with national grid for electricity supply. Still more than 25.48 per cent household use solar systems for light, kerosene (2.15%) and other sources of energy (1.18%). The Hydro Power Project of Chokhopani generates 744 KW of electrical energy. There are two micro-hydro plants currently working and two are under construction. Despite significant potential, solar and wind power generation have not been met with much success in Mustang as of 2017, though Alternative Energy Promotion Centre (AEPC) maintained that, together with neighbouring Manang District, Mustang has a potential of 2500 MW of wind electricity. 853 households have solar home systems for lighting in 10 VDCs.

== Transport and Himalayan trade ==
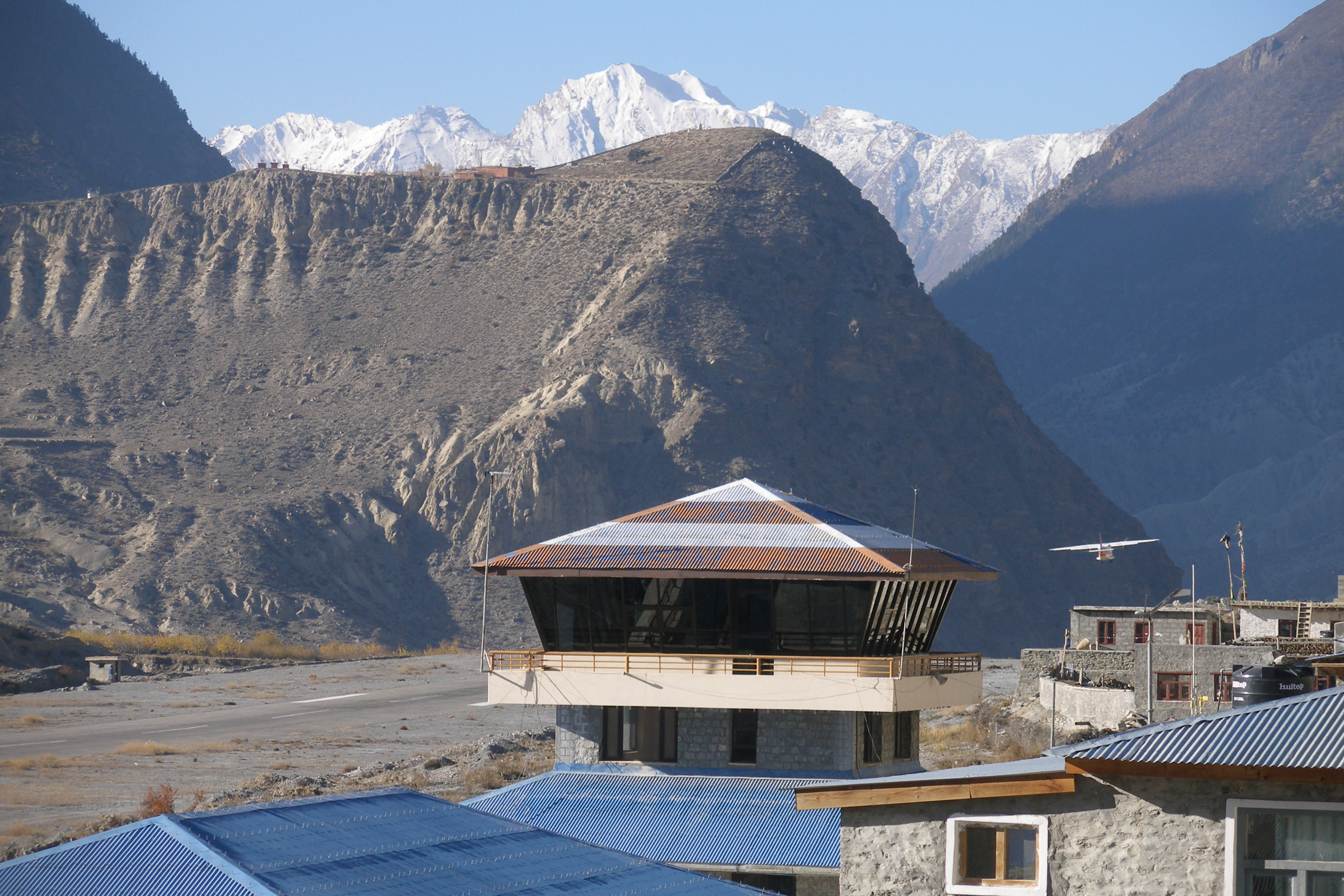
Jomsom Airport

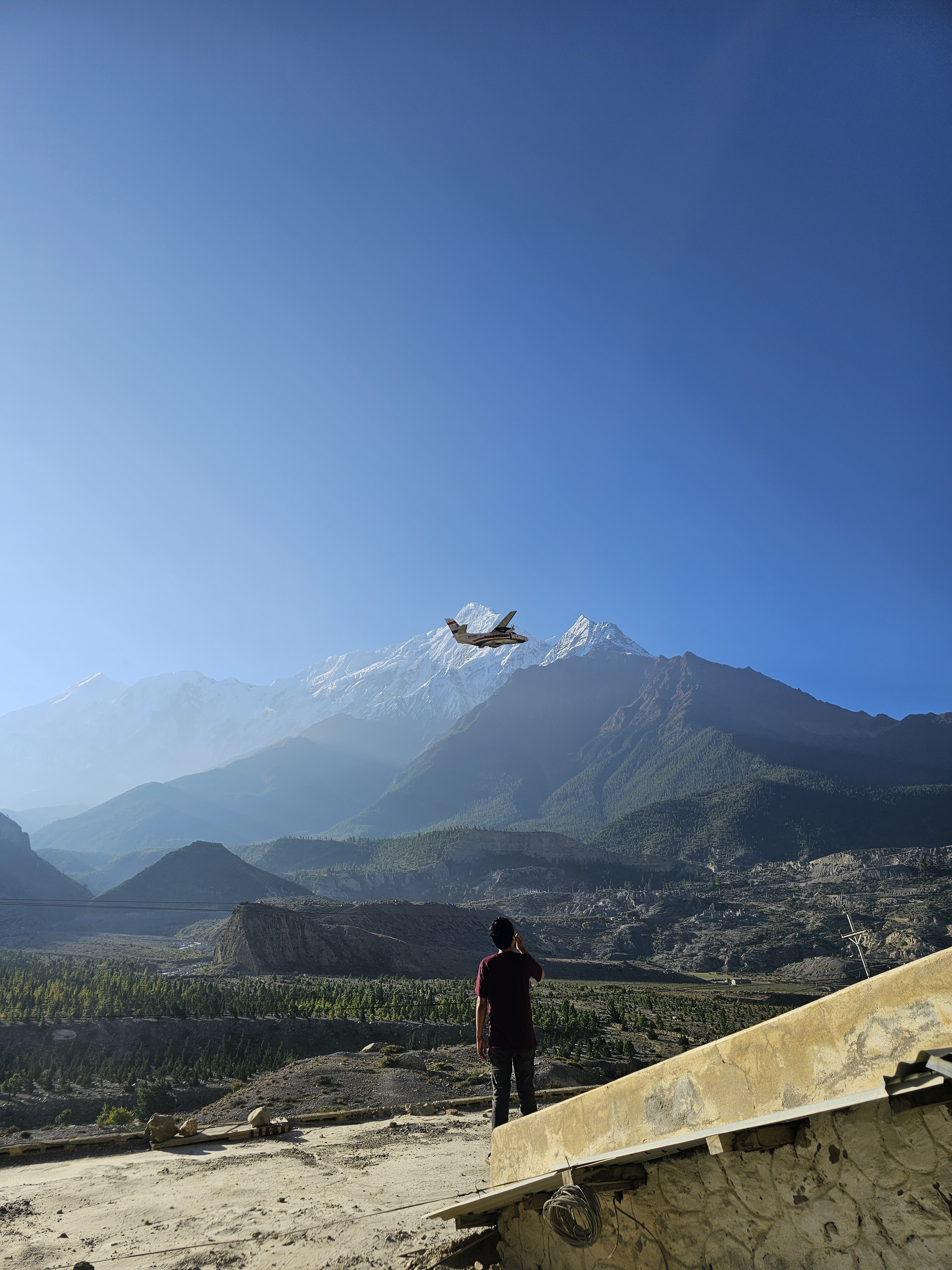
A plane flying from Jomsom Airport, Mustang District, Nepal, towards the Himalayas mountain.

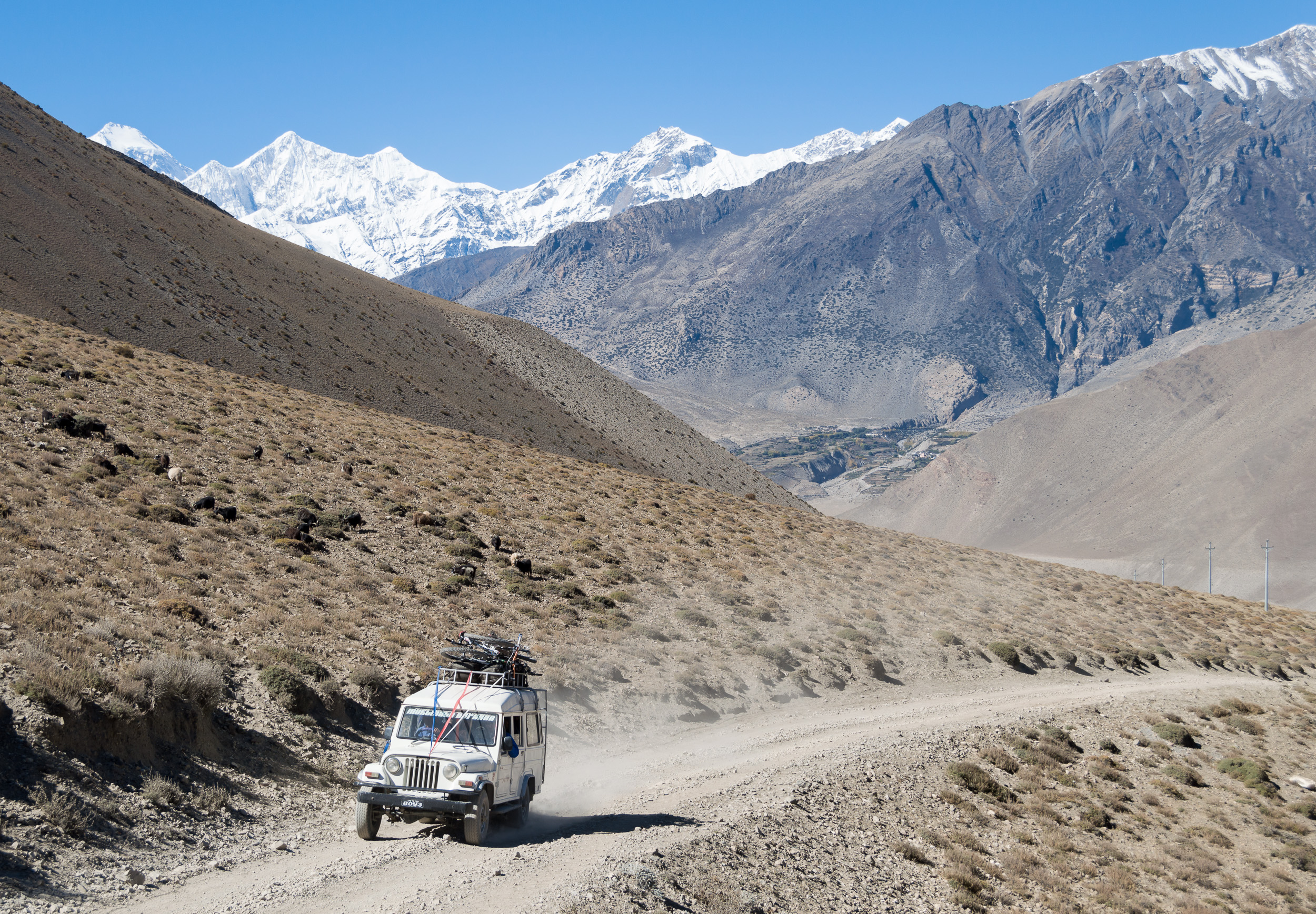
Jeep going from Jomsom to Muktinath

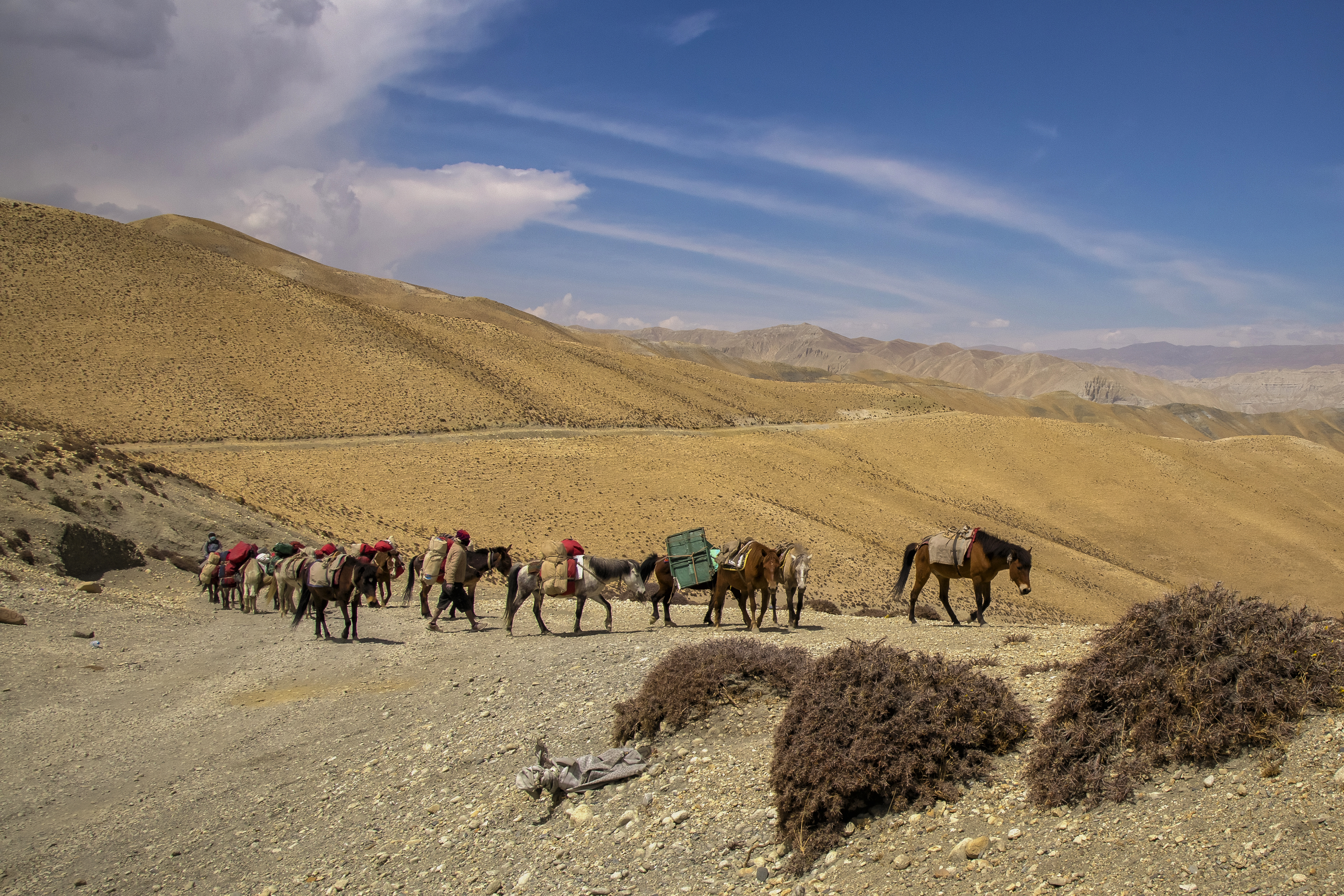
Horse caravan in Upper Mustang

Upper Mustang of Nepal is on an ancient trade route between Nepal and Tibet exploiting the lowest 4,660 metres (15,300 ft) pass Kora La through the Himalaya west of Sikkim. This route remained in use until China's annexation of Tibet in 1950. China eventually decided to revitalise trade and in 2001 completed a 20 kilometres (12 mi) road from the international border to Lo Manthang. Across the TAR border is Zhongba County of Shigatse Prefecture. China National Highway 219 follows the valley of the Yarlung Tsangpo River some 50 kilometres (31 mi) north of the border. Till today Manang and Humde are accessible only on feet or on horseback.

Meanwhile, Nepal is building a road north along the Kali Gandaki River, to within 9 kilometres (6 mi) of Lo Manthang as of 2010. But, road-building from the south was inhibited by difficulties along the Kali Gandaki Gorge, and proceeded incrementally. In 2010, a 9 kilometres (6 mi) gap remained but the road was completed before 2015 and is suitable for high clearance and four-wheel drive vehicles. A gravel road leading to Kora La had been completed ahead of the border crossing's opening in 2023. This road continues from the border about 50 kilometres (31 mi) into Zhongba County of Shigatse Prefecture, TAR, eventually joining China National Highway 219, which follows the valley of the Yarlung Tsangpo River. Currently, the easiest and only widely used road corridor, from Kathmandu to Lhasa—named Arniko Highway in Nepal and China National Highway 318 in the TAR—traverses a 5,125 metres (16,810 ft) pass.

Mustang is accessed by air through Jomsom Airport at Jomsom which is operating 50 kilometres (31 mi) south of China at the approximate boundary between the southern Thak and northern Lo sections of the valley since the 1960s. Jomsom Airport is a STOL airport located on the bank of the Kali Gandaki River serving Jomsom and the Mustang District. The airport resides at an elevation of 8,976 feet (2,736 m) above mean sea level. It serves as the gateway to the Mustang District that includes Jomsom, Kagbeni, Tangbe, and Lo Manthang, and to Muktinath temple, which is a popular pilgrimage for Hindus and Buddhists.

The airport is capable of handling aircraft from the Nepalese Army Air Service. It has one asphalt paved runway designated 06/24 which measures 2,424 by 66 feet (739 m × 20 m). There is a down slope of 1.75% up to about 418 feet (127 m) from the threshold of runway 06. There are also scheduled flights from Kathmandu and daily flights between Pokhara and Jomsom during daylight hours in good weather.

Airlines	Destinations
Gorkha Airlines	Pokhara
Nepal Airlines	Pokhara
Simrik Airlines	Pokhara
Sita Air	Kathmandu, Pokhara
Tara Air	Pokhara

The airport is available throughout the year but visibility is not adequate for visual flight rules (VFR) flight about 15% of the time. As the wind often prevents airport operation after midday, airlines schedule flights to Jomsom for the early morning when wind speeds are low. In the 2013 movie Planes produced by DisneyToon Studios and released by Walt Disney Pictures one of the stops in Wings Across the World race is Nepal where the Planes land in Mustang. There also are 5 helipads in Muktinath, Thotong Phedi, Ghermu, and Bahundanda.

Jomsom (Ward No. 4 of Gharpajhong Rural Municipality also known as Dzongsam (New Fort), is the centre of Gharapjhong rural municipality in Mustang district

== Tourism ==
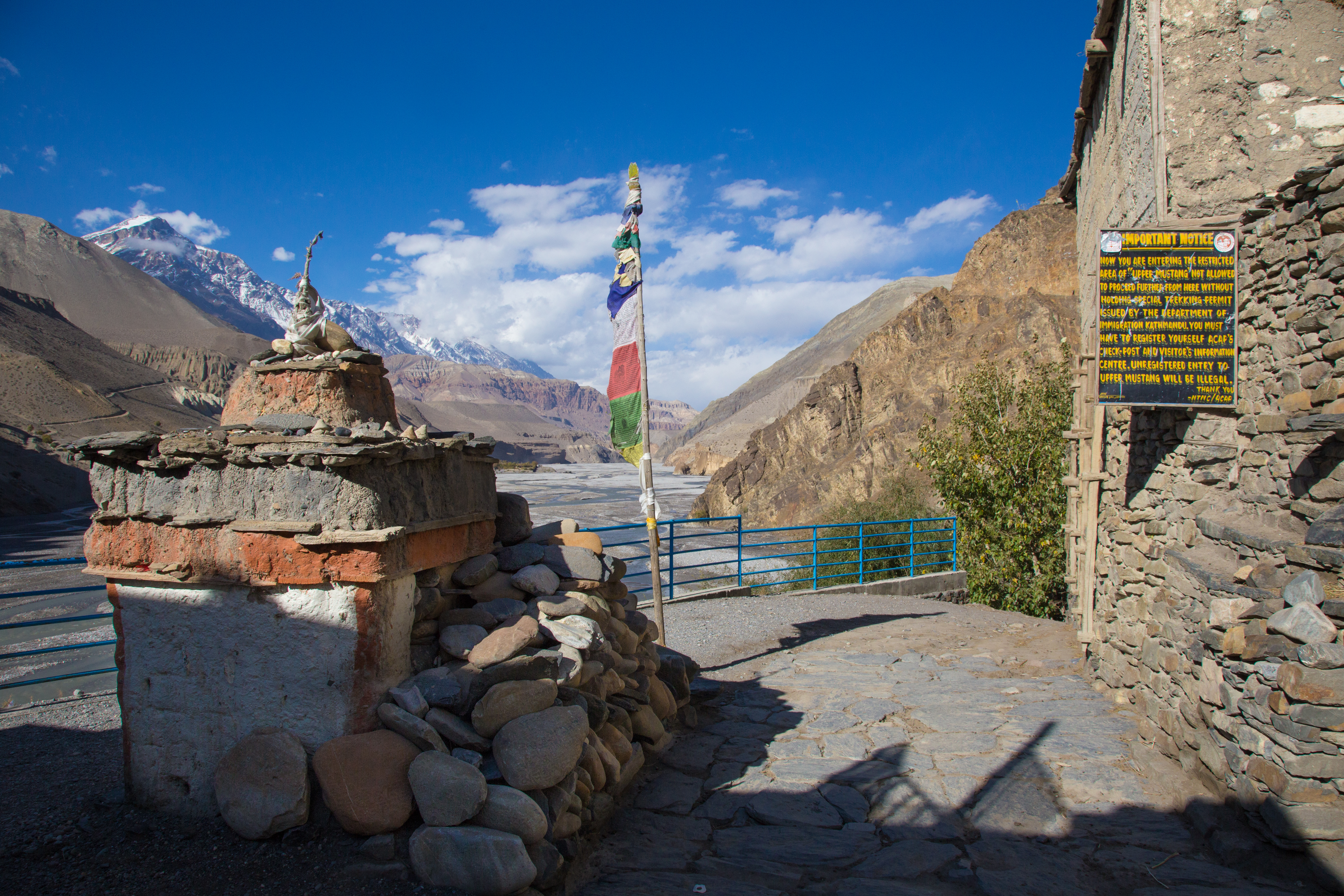
The sign says, "Now you are entering the restricted area of "Upper Mustang". Not allowed to proceed further from here without holding special trekking permit issued by the department of immigration, Kathmandu. You must have to register yourself at ACAP’S check-post and visitor's information centre. Unregistered entry to Upper Mustang will be illegal. Thank you. -- NTNC/ACAP" (Kagbeni)

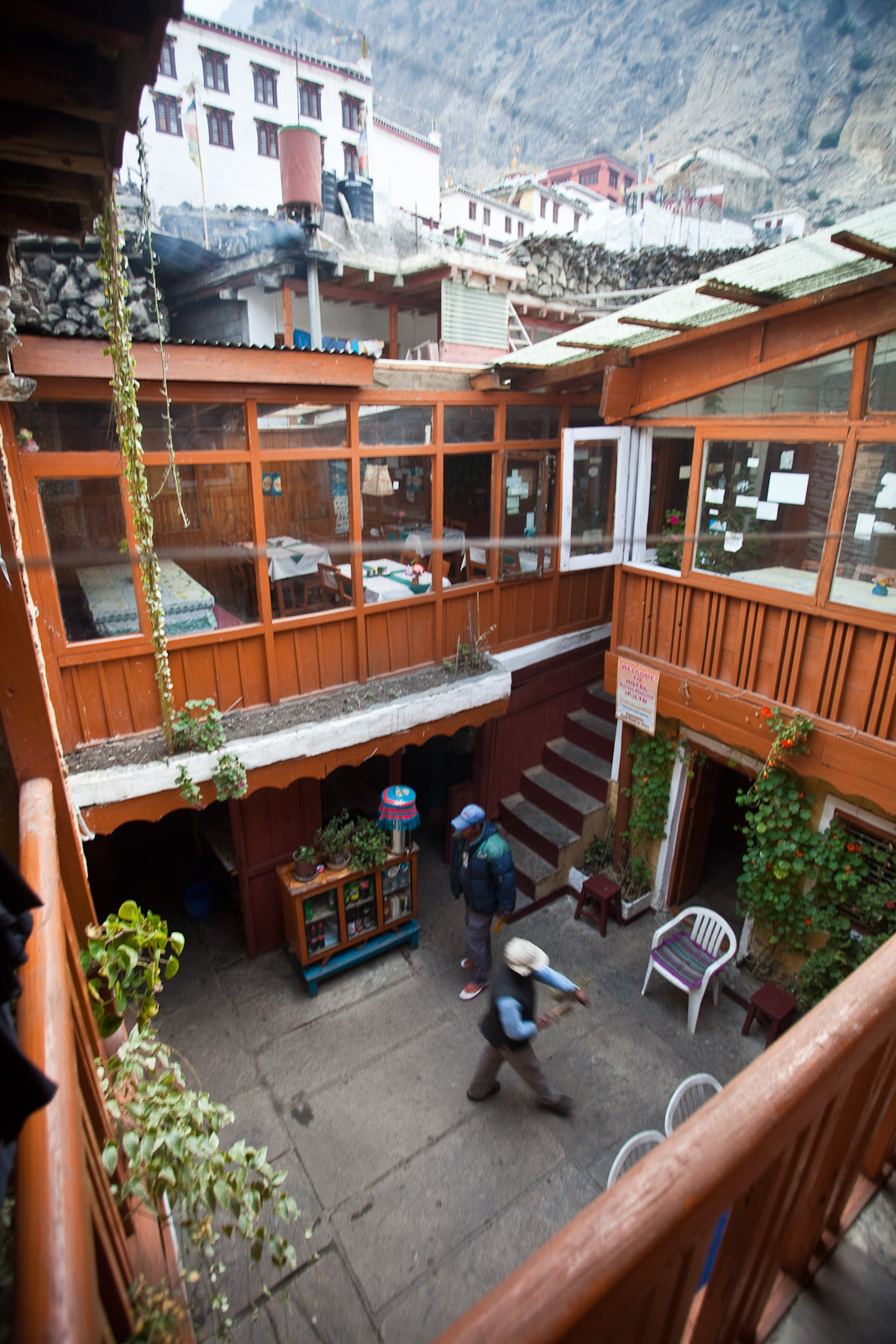
Guest House in Marpha

The kingdom was closed to foreigners, with rare exceptions, until 1992. Professor David Snellgrove and Italian scholars Giuseppe Tucci and Michel Peissel travelled to Mustang in the 1950s. Their tales of a Tibetan kingdom in an arid and locked off from the rest of the world ignited the interest in Mustang District. The first westerner in Mustang was Toni Hagen, Swiss explorer and geologist, who visited the Kingdom in 1952 during one of his travels across the Himalayas. French Michel Peissel is considered the first westerner to stay in Lo Manthang, during the first authorised exploration of Mustang in 1964.

Lo was out-of-bounds for foreigners until 1992. Although it is now open on a restricted basis to foreign travellers, tourism to the region is still strictly restricted and hard to access. The Nepalese government have introduced a surcharge for anyone trekking past Kagbeni, which marks the border of Upper Mustang. Foreign tourists are required by the Nepalese Department of Immigration to acquire special permits, pay fairly steep fees of US$50 per day per person, and be accompanied by a liaison (guide) to protect local tradition and environment from outside influence. Annapurna Conservation Area (ACAP) check post/info posts are spread along the trails in Jomsom, Muktinath, Kagbeni and Lo Manthang.

The ancestral isolation of Mustang helped to retain its ancient culture largely unviolated, and it survives as one of the last bastion of traditional Tibetan life. In this ancient forbidden kingdom traditions have survived longer than in Tibet proper following its annexation by China. The lower Mustang areas (much of Baragaon, Panchgaon, and Thak Sat Sae along the Annapurna Circuit) are among the most heavily trekked routes in Nepal. The scenery of the trail ranges from forests of bright rhododendron fields to rocky cliffs and desert. The culture along the trekk is a rich combination of Hindu and Tibetan Buddhism. The trail's highest point is Muktinath at 3800 m, a popular Hindu and Buddhist pilgrimage site for centuries. The Kali Gandaki Gorge is part of the popular trekking route from Pokhara to Muktinath. The gorge is within the Annapurna Conservation Area.

Drinks, smokes and food

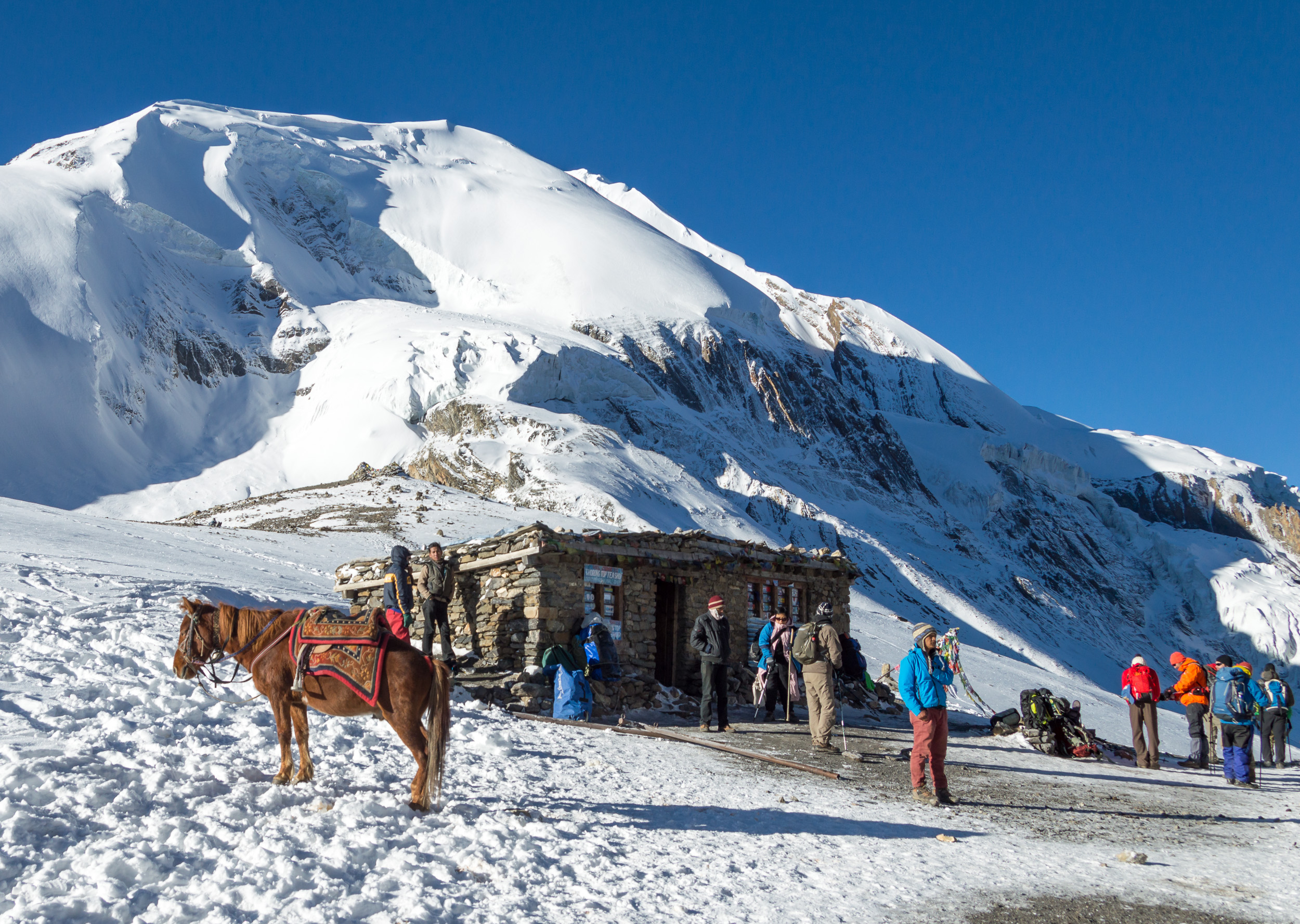
Tea-house on Thorong La pass that serves butter tea

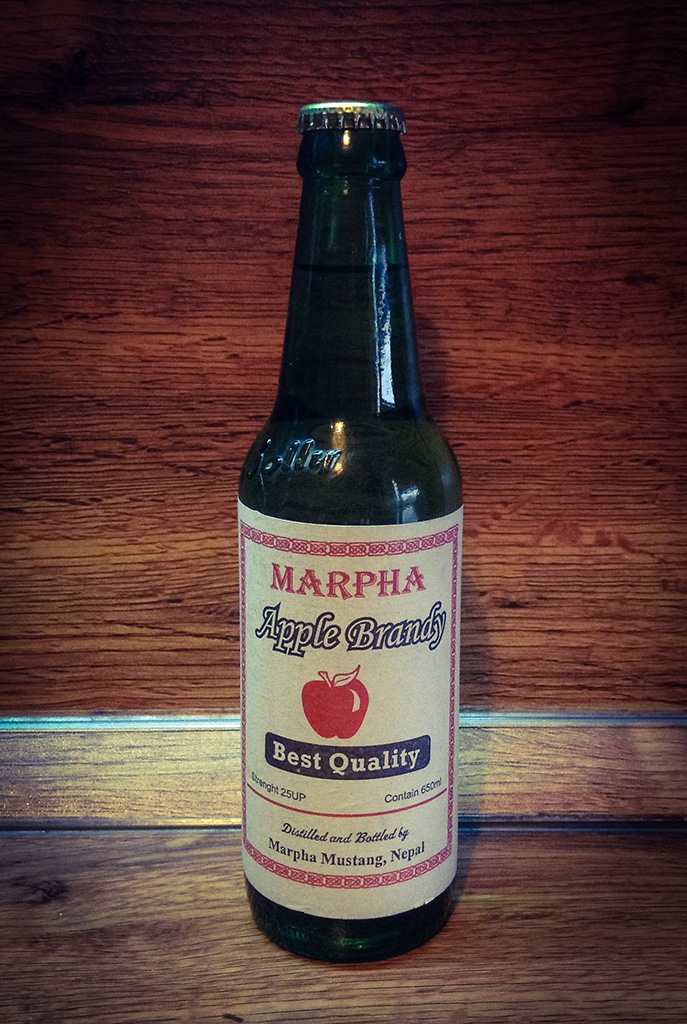
Brandy from Marpha

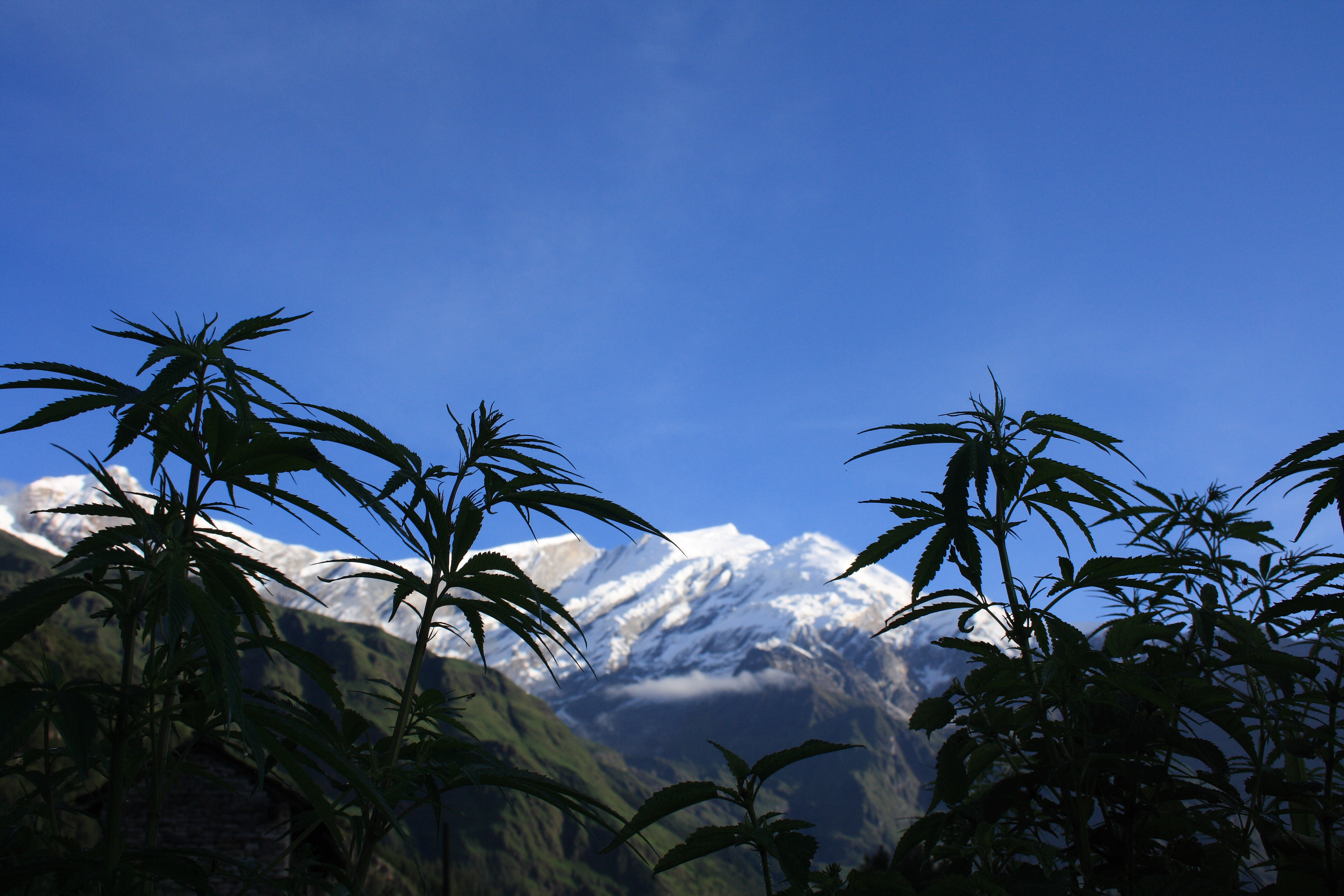
Cannabis plants in Lete, in front of Dhaulagiri

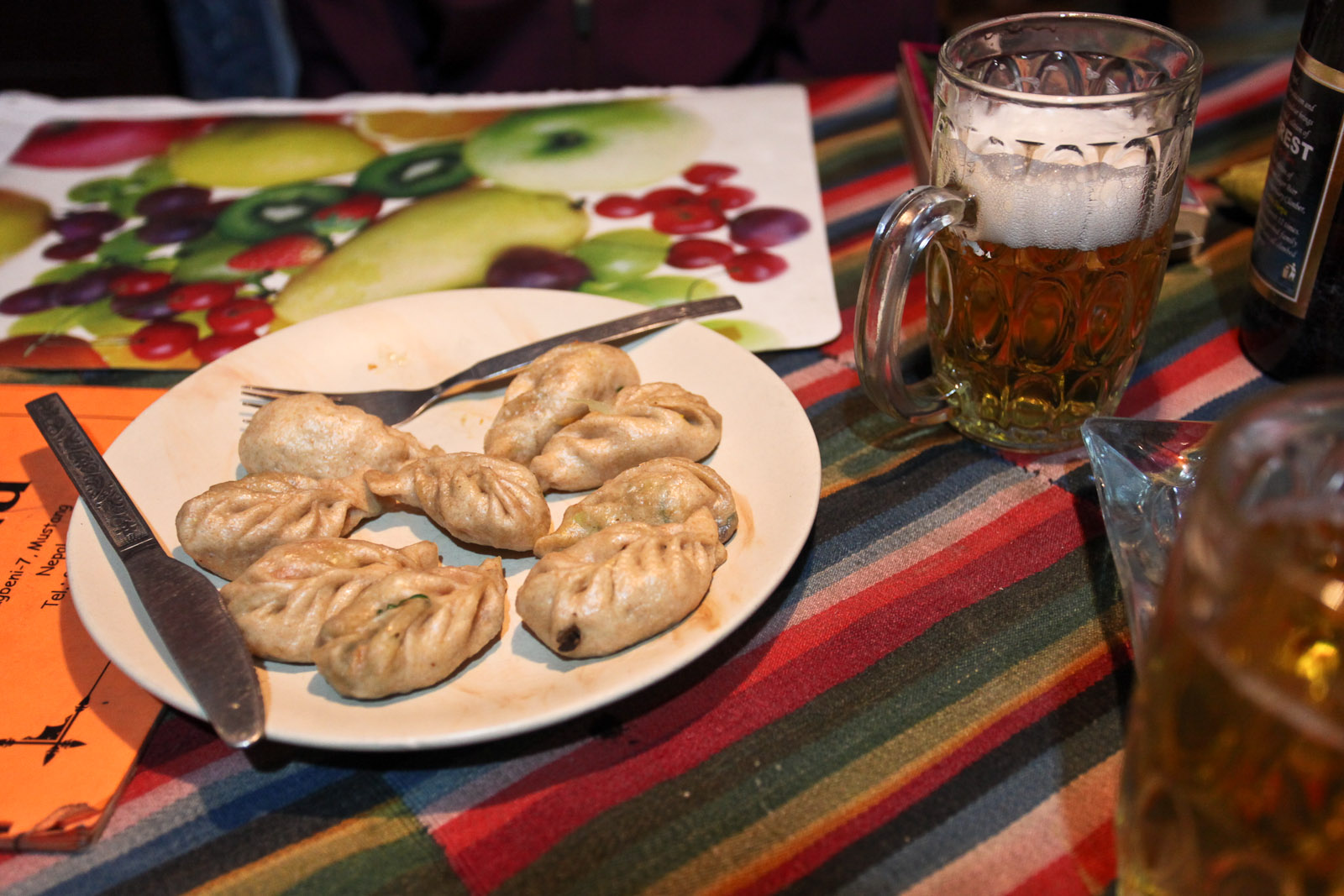
Momo and local beer served at a guest house in Kagbeni

Some of the top tourist attractions are Lomanthang, Muktinath, the Mustangi royal palace, Tibetan art and culture, and trekking in the Annapurna Circuit. In addition to trekking routes through the Lo Kingdom (Upper Mustang) and along the Annapurna Circuit (lower Mustang), the district is also famous for the springs and village of Muktinath (a popular Hindu and Buddhist pilgrimage site), apples, and Marpha brandy made from a variety of fruits (pear, apricot, apple) produced on a farm managed by the Pasang Sherpa. There are safe water stations in Ghasa, Near Lete at ACAP museum, Kobang, Tukche, Marpha, between Jomsom and Dhapus Peak, Kagbeni and Muktinath. Thorung, Phedi, Letdar, Manang, Humde, Pisang, Chame, Bagarchhap, and Tal has the most famous view points in the district.

Most tourists travel by foot over largely the same trade route used in the 15th century. Over a thousand western trekkers now visit each year, with just over 2000 foreign tourists in 2008. August and October are the peak visiting months. On 27 August 2010, local youth leaders in Mustang threatened to bar tourists beginning 1 October 2010 due to the refusal of the Nepalese government to provide any of the $50 per day fee to the local economy. Visitation, however, continued uninterrupted beyond that date. Now that upper Mustang is open to foreigners on a restricted basis, the Lopa have increased the number of horses kept in the hopes of benefiting from tourism. Trekkers in this and other restricted areas of Nepal are required by government regulation to porter in all food and fuel, thereby minimising environmental impact.

According to the Annapurna Conservation Area Project (ACAP), a total of 39,017 tourists visited Mustang District in 2016. According to Tulasi Dahal, the Jomsom Chief of ACAP, 15,478 of these visitors were from India alone. It shows a considerable rise in the number of tourists over the 23,272 who visited in the previous year. The highest number of tourists arrived in the month of May with 6,816 visitors and the lowest was recorded in January with 365.
