= List of World Heritage Sites in Nepal =

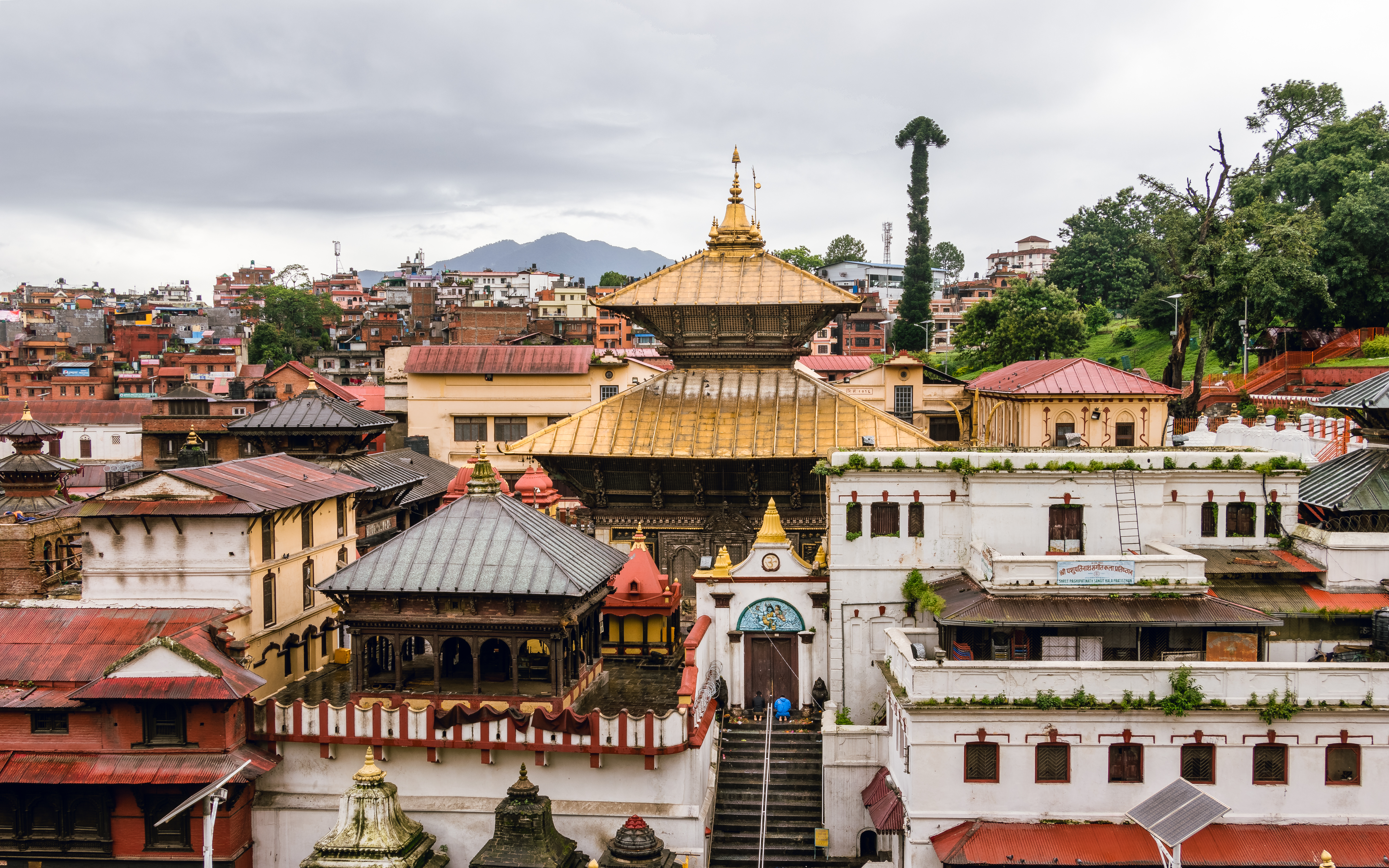
Pashupatinātha Temple, associated with Shiva as 'the lord of all beings'

Location of World Heritage Sites in Nepal. Green dots represent natural sites, the red dot is a cultural site. Purple dots represent the sites of Kathmandu Valley.

The United Nations Educational, Scientific and Cultural Organization (UNESCO) designates World Heritage Sites of outstanding universal value to cultural or natural heritage which have been nominated by countries which are signatories to the UNESCO World Heritage Convention, established in 1972. Cultural heritage consists of monuments (such as architectural works, monumental sculptures, or inscriptions), groups of buildings, and sites (including archaeological sites). Natural heritage consists of natural features (physical and biological formations), geological and physiographical formations (including habitats of threatened species of animals and plants), and natural sites which are important from the point of view of science, conservation, or natural beauty. Nepal ratified the convention on 20 June 1978, making its historical sites eligible for inclusion on the list.

Four sites in Nepal were on the list in 2023, with a further fifteen on the tentative list, of sites that may be considered for future submission. The first sites in Nepal to be added to the list were the Sagarmatha National Park and the Kathmandu Valley, added in 1979. Due to the partial or substantial loss of the traditional elements of six out of seven monument zones and resulting general loss of authenticity and integrity of the whole property, Kathmandu Valley was also added to the List of World Heritage in Danger between 2003 and 2007. Chitwan National Park was listed in 1984, and Lumbini, the birthplace of Buddha according to Buddhist tradition, was added in 1997. The National Parks are natural sites, and the other two are cultural.

== World Heritage Sites ==
UNESCO lists sites under ten criteria; each entry must meet at least one of the criteria. Criteria i through vi are cultural, and vii through x are natural.

* Trans-border site

| Site | | Image | Location (District) | Year listed | UNESCO data | Description |
|---|---|---|---|---|---|---|
| Sagarmatha National Park | | A village in a large mountain valley. In the distance very high snow-covered mountains are visible. | Solukhumbu | 1979 | 120; vii (natural) | Sagarmatha National Park encompasses the mountains of the Great Himalayan Range which includes the Earth's highest mountain above sea level, Mount Everest (known in Nepal as Sagarmatha), and the Sacred Himalayan Landscape, the transboundary landscape in the eastern Himalayas. The park covers an area of 124,400 hectares (307,000 acres) of land and 20 villages with 6000 Sherpas who have lived in the area for the last four centuries. |
| Kathmandu Valley | Bhaktapur Durbar Square | | Bhaktapur | 1979 | 121; iii, iv, vi (cultural) | The World Heritage Site comprises seven properties: Bhaktapur Durbar Square, Boudhanath, Changu Narayan Temple, Kathmandu Durbar Square, Pashupatinath Temple, Patan Durbar Square, and Swayambhunath (pictured). Three royal Durbar Squares were used by the Mallas, after the unification of Nepal they were used by the Shahs, and the Ranas. Two stupas: Swayambhunath is the oldest and Boudhanath is the largest in Nepal. Changu Narayan Temple is the oldest Hindu temple in Nepal dating back to the fifth century AD, and Pashupatinath Temple is the largest temple complex in Nepal. Kathmandu Valley was listed as endangered from 2003 to 2007 due to the partial or substantial loss of the traditional elements of six out of seven monument zones and resulting in a general loss of authenticity and integrity of the whole property. |
| Kathmandu Valley | Boudhanath Stupa | | Kathmandu | 1979 | 121; iii, iv, vi (cultural) | |
| Kathmandu Valley | Changu Narayan Temple | | Bhaktapur | 1979 | 121; iii, iv, vi (cultural) | |
| Kathmandu Valley | Kathmandu Durbar Square | | Kathmandu | 1979 | 121; iii, iv, vi (cultural) | |
| Kathmandu Valley | Pashupatinath Temple | | Kathmandu | 1979 | 121; iii, iv, vi (cultural) | |
| Kathmandu Valley | Patan Durbar Square | | Lalitpur | 1979 | 121; iii, iv, vi (cultural) | |
| Kathmandu Valley | Swayambunath | | Kathmandu | 1979 | 121; iii, iv, vi (cultural) | |
| Chitwan National Park | | A lake with tree trunks in the water. | Chitwan, Nawalpur, Parasi, Parsa, and Makwanpur | 1984 | 284; vii, ix, x (natural) | Chitwan National Park, part of the subtropical Inner Terai lowlands of south-central Nepal, is home to one of the last populations of Indian rhinoceros and the Bengal tiger. Historically used by the feudal big game hunters and their entourage, where they stayed for a couple of months shooting hundreds of tigers, rhinoceroses, elephants, leopards, and sloth bears. The park is now one of the last remaining ecosystems of the Tarai region and it is home to over 68 mammal species. |
| Lumbini, the Birthplace of the Lord Buddha | | A large tree next to a water filled pool. | Rupandehi | 1997 | 666; iii, vi (cultural) | Lumbini, where the founder of the world religion of Buddhism, Gautama Buddha, was born in 623 BC. Lumbini is regarded as one of the holiest places in Buddhism and it features pilgrimage sites dating back to the 3rd century BC. The complex includes the Lumbini pillar inscription, Maya Devi Temple, and Shakya Tank where Maya bathed before giving birth to Buddha. |

== Tentative list ==
In addition to the sites inscribed on the World Heritage List, member states can maintain a list of tentative sites that they may consider for nomination. Nominations for the World Heritage List are only accepted if the site was previously listed on the tentative list. As of 2019, Nepal recorded 15 sites on its tentative list.

| Site | Image | Location (District) | Year listed | UNESCO criteria | Description |
|---|---|---|---|---|---|
| The early medieval architectural complex of Panauti | | Kavrepalanchowk | 1996 | Cultural | Panauti, located at the confluence of two sacred rivers Roshi River and Punyamati River, is home to numerous heritage structures. Both Hindus and Buddhists consider Panauti to be a sacred town, and it contains numerous architectural complexes including the Indresvar Mahadev Temple and the Brahmayani Temple. Yomari, a popular delicacy in Nepal, originated from Panauti. |
| Tilaurakot, the archaeological remains of ancient Shakya Kingdom | | Kapilvastu | 1996 | Cultural | Tilaurakot is believed to be the cardinal point of the ancient Shakya city of Kapilavastu, where Gautama Buddha spent 29 years of his life. He left his palace at Kapilavastu to live a life as an ascetic to reach enlightenment. Tilaurakot is also a holy site for Hindus and there are numerous temples on the site. |
| Cave architecture of Muktinath Valley of Mustang | | Mustang | 1996 | Cultural | Sky Caves of Mustang were originally used as burial chambers, the caves eventually became meditation chambers, military lookouts, or storage units as part of the Kingdom of Lo. There are roughly around 10,000 man-made caves dug into the sides of valleys, some of which are estimated to be thousands of years old. |
| The medieval palace complex of Gorkha | | Gorkha | 1996 | Cultural | Gorkha Palace complex is a 16th-century palace built by the King of Gorkha, Ram Shah. Built in traditional Nepalese architecture, It served as a fort, a palace, and a temple. Prithvi Narayan Shah was crowned as the King of Gorkha in the palace, who would later be crowned the first King of a unified Nepal. Gorkha Palace was severely damaged by the April 2015 Nepal earthquake. |
| Ramagrama, the relic stupa of Lord Buddha | | Parasi | 1996 | Cultural | The site includes the only undisturbed original stupa containing relics of Buddha. According to the legends, Mauryan emperor, Ashoka, visited the Ramagrama in 249 BC, however, when he tried to open the stupa, a snake god appeared and told him not to open it, subsequently, he left it alone. Currently, there are no plans to open the stupa, and the site only features a grassy mound. |
| Khokana, the vernacular village and its mustard-oil seed industrial heritage | | Lalitpur | 1996 | Cultural | Khokana is described being a "living museum" as includes a system of drainage and chowks, traditional houses, chaityas, a mother deity temple, and its mustard fields and processing sites. Home to the indigenous Newar people, governed as part of the Lalitpur metropolitan city, and Khokana has some surviving works from the Kirata-era. Today, it is known for producing mustard oil. |
| Medieval Earthen Walled City of Lo Manthang | | Mustang | 2008 | Cultural | Lo Manthang was established as the capital of the Kingdom of Lo in the 14th century. Situated 3800 meters above sea level, it was once the hub of the ancient Tibet–Nepal salt trade route. Even though Nepal was opened to the outside world in the 1950s, Upper Mustang was restricted to foreigners until 1992 and currently, there is a limit on how many tourists are allowed to visit. Due to its isolation, the city has preserved its way of life. |
| Vajrayogini and early settlement of Sankhu | | Kathmandu | 2008 | Cultural | The site includes the Lichchhavi period (2nd to 9th century AD) settlement of Sankhu and the Vajrayogini temple complex constructed in the mid 17th century. |
| Medieval Settlement of Kirtipur | | Kathmandu | 2008 | Cultural | The site includes the Newar monuments of Chilancho Vihar, Jagat Pal Vihar, Buddha Dharma Sangha Shikhara, Baghbhairab Temple, Vath (Layaku), Umamaheshvar Temple, Indrayani Pith, Chitu Bahail, Lokeshwar Shikhara, Buddha Temple, Chve Bahal and Kwe Bahal. |
| Rishikesh Complex of Ruru Kshetra | | Palpa | 2008 | Cultural | The site includes an ancient route and cremation site between Muktinath and Damodar Kunda, the settlement of Ridi, and the entire complex. |
| Nuwakot Palace Complex | | Nuwakot | 2008 | Cultural | The site includes Nuwakot Palace and various temples and shrines, such as Bhairab Temple. |
| Janaki Mandir | | Dhanusha | 2008 | Cultural | The site is composed of classical and neo-classical designs with elements of fortification. |
| The Medieval Town of Tansen | | Palpa | 2008 | Cultural | The site includes Bhairab Temple, the Purankot Durbar, the Srinagar Durbar (Fort), the Bansha Gopal, the Mukundeshwar Mahadev, the Amar Narayan Temple, the Ran-Ujjeshwari Bhagawati Temple and the Tansen Durbar. |
| Sinja Valley | | Jumla | 2008 | Cultural | The site includes the capital of the Khasas kingdom from the 12th to 14th centuries. |
| Bhurti Temple Complex of Dailekh | | Dailekh | 2008 | Cultural | The site includes 22 monuments constructed through the Western Malla architectural style. |
