= Jigme Dorje Palbar Bista =

King of Mustang (1930–2016)

Jigme Dorje Palbar Bista འཇིག་མེད་རྡོ་རྗེ་དཔལ་འབར།
- Lo Gyalpo
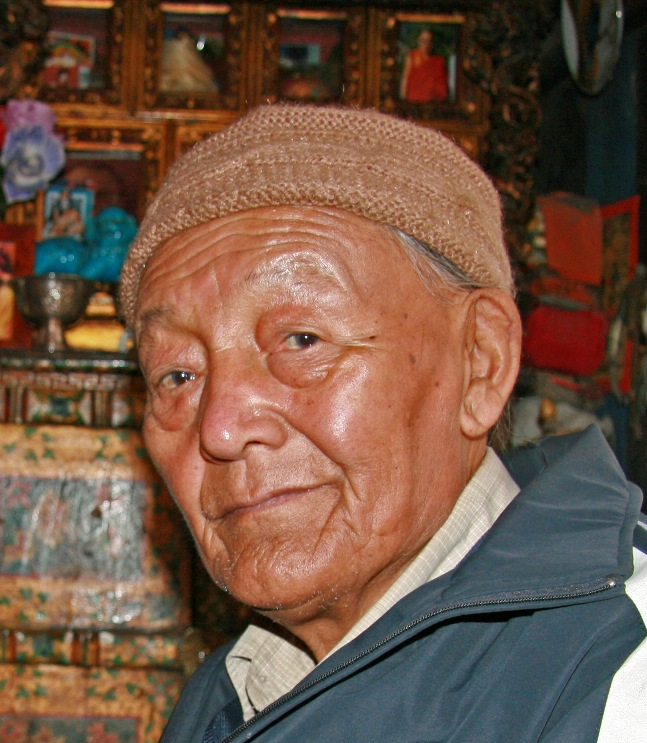
- King Jigme Dorje Palbar Bista in 2007
- Reign: 1964–2008
- Predecessor: Angdu Nyingpo Palbar
- Successor: Abolished
- Born: 1930; Lo Manthang, Mustang district, Nepal
- Died: December 16, 2016 (aged 86); Kathmandu, Nepal
- Spouse: Sidol Palbar
- Issue: Angun Tenzing (died young)
Names
- Jigme Dorje Palbar Bista
- House: Lo
- Father: King Angun Tenzing Trandul Bista
- Mother: Queen Kelsang Choeden
- Religion: Tibetan Buddhism

Flag of the Kingdom of Mustang.

Jigme Dorje Palbar Bista (Standard Tibetan: འཇིག་མེད་རྡོ་རྗེ་དཔལ་འབར།; Nepali: जिग्मे दोर्जे पलवर विष्ट; 1930 – 16 December 2016) was the King of Mustang (Standard Tibetan: Lo Gyalpo, Nepali: Mustang Rājā) between 1964 and 2008, until monarchy, semi-monarchy, vassals and titular kingship were abolished in Nepal. He was descendant in the 25th generation of King Amadpal bist (1440–1447), who was founder of the Kingdom of Lo. King Amadpal Bist was from the direct lineage of the greatest king of Tibet, Songtsen Gampo.

== Biography ==
Lo Gyalpo (King) Jigme Dorje Palbar Bista was born in Lo-Manthang Palace in Upper Mustang. He was the third son of Lo Gyalpo Angun Tenzing Trandul, by his Tibetan aristocrat wife, Queen Kelsang Choeden of the Zhalu Kushang family of the Che clan. She was the elder sister of Ngawang Khyenrab Thupten Lekshe Gyatso, the 18th Chogye Trichen Rinpoche. The Zhalu Kushang family of the Che clan is a distinguished aristocratic lineage from the Tsang region of Tibet. Historically, they were lords of the Zhalu area during the Yuan dynasty (13th–14th centuries) and were known for their patronage of Buddhist monasteries, including Zhalu Monastery, Ngor Monastery, and Nalendra Monastery. Their name, "Kushang," meaning "royal maternal uncle," reflects their significant role in Tibetan nobility, particularly through intermarriages with Sakya throne holders.

Jigme Dorje became head of the Royal House of Lo, assuming the title Lo Gyalpo (King of Mustang), after his elder brother, King Angdu Nyingpo Palbar, passed away at a young age. Lo Gyalpo Angdu Nyingpo had married a Tibetan aristocrat and left behind only two daughters; his eldest, Lo Selmo (Princess) Chimi Dolkar Palbar Bista, and a younger daughter whose name is unrecorded. Princess Chimi Dolkar later had two sons, one of whom married a Bhutanese Princess. In the absence of a male heir from King Angdu Nyingpo, the crown passed to his younger brother, Jigme Dorje.

== Marriage ==
In the 1950s, he married Sidol Palwar, a noble lady from Shigatse, Tibet who became Queen Consort Sahiba Sidol. He had one son, Angun Tenzin, who died at the age of 8, and later adopted his nephew, Jigme Singhe Palbar Bista (b. 1957), as son and heir.

== Trans-Himalayan Marital Alliances ==
The Mustang royal family has forged marriage alliances with prominent Tibetan aristocratic families, and members of the Bhutanese royal family, reinforcing their longstanding regional ties over the centuries.

Today, members of the Lo royal family are dispersed across Kathmandu, San Francisco, and Upper Mustang.

== Succession ==
After Dorje Palbar Bista's death, his nephew Jigme Singhe Palbar Bista became the successor of the rituals carried out by the King. Without a formal style, he still attends cultural ceremonies taking place in the former kingdom. In 2023, the eldest son of Jigme Singhe Palbar Bista got married, the ceremony was celebrated at the Lo Manthang Palace.

== Education ==
King Jigme Dorje was educated privately at Shigatse, Tibet.

== Bista title ==
Although the family's original royal surname was Palbar, it was later changed to Bista. Bista was a title gifted by King of Nepal which means Distinguished Baron in the Nepali language and not the Nepali family name Bista. He was a member of the Raj Sabha (1964–1990) and a Lieutenant Colonel of Nepalese Army (1964).

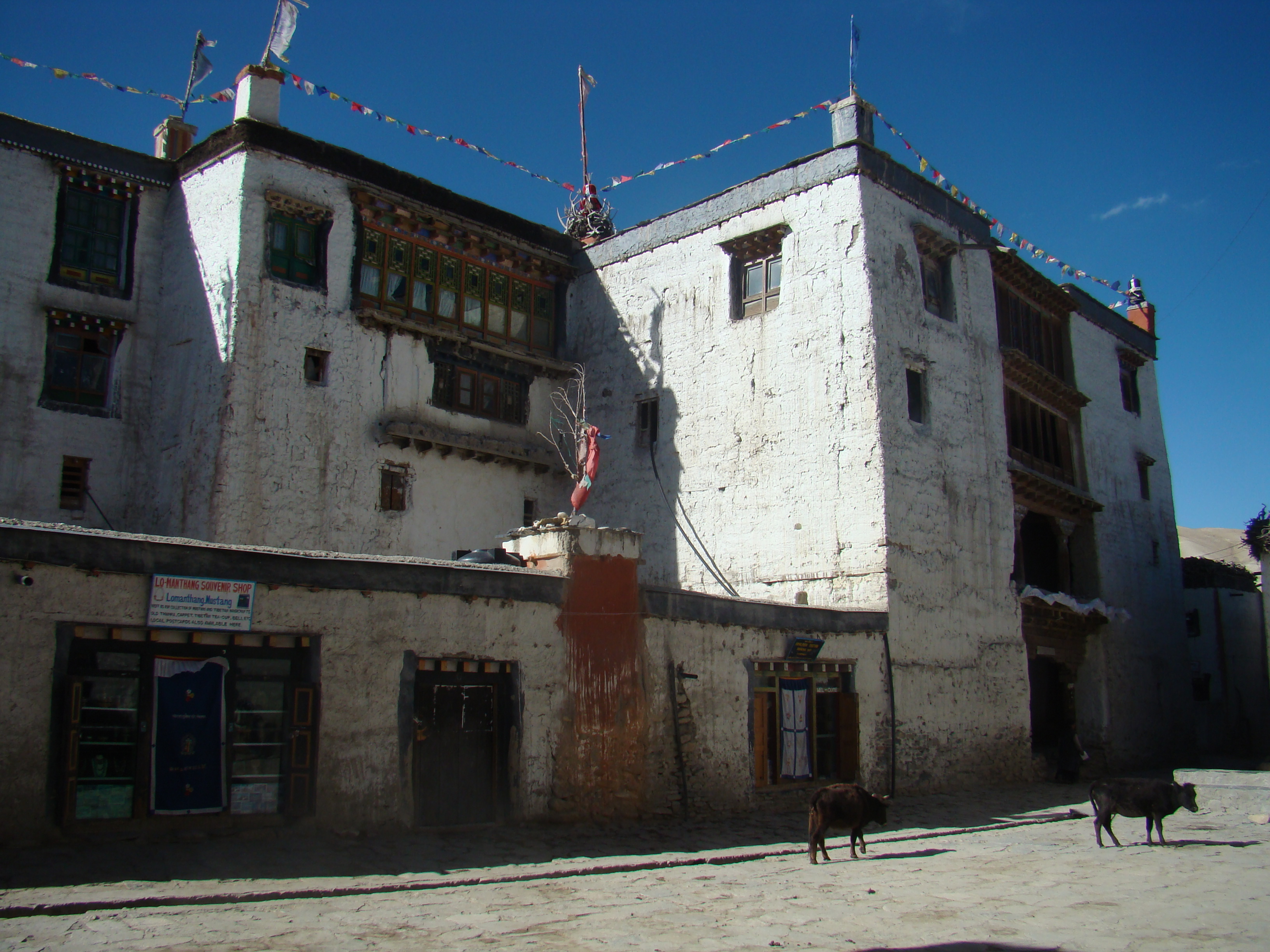
Lo Manthang Palace

== Honours ==
- King Birendra Coronation Medal (24 February 1975).
- King Gyanendra Coronation Medal (4 June 2001).

== Ancestry ==
Ancestors of Jigme Dorje Palbar Bista

16. Kunga Norbu, Raja of Mustang
8. Sa-dbang dBang-rgyal-nor-bu, Lama of Tsarang
17. bKra-shis bu-khrid
4. Jamyang Pelbar, Raja of Mustang
9. Tshe-mchog sGrol-ma
2. Angun Tenzing Trandul, Raja of Mustang
1. Jigme Dorje Palbar Bista, Raja of Mustang
3. Kelsang Choeden

== See also ==
- Kingdom of Mustang

== Bibliography ==
- Paul Raffaele, Il re del Mustang, <Le ultime tribù sulla Terra>, pp. 205–220, fbe edizioni, Trezzano sul Naviglio 2003.

Preceded by Angdu Nyingpo Palbar	King of Mustang; 1964–2008	Succeeded by Monarchy abolished
