= Chhonhup =

Chhonhup, Mustang छोनहुप
- Village development committee
- Location in Nepal Chhonhup, Mustang (Nepal)
- Coordinates: 29.28°N 83.94°E
- Country: Nepal
- Zone: Dhawalagiri Zone
- District: Mustang District

Population (1991)
  - Total: 1,047
- Time zone: UTC+5:45 (Nepal Time)

Chhonhup is a village development committee in Mustang District in the Dhawalagiri Zone of northern Nepal. At the time of the 1991 Nepal census it had a population of 1047 people living in 192 individual households.

== Thinggar ==
Thinggar is the most prominent village in the Chhonhup Valley, the western valley of Lo Manthang, Mustang District. The settlement lies on a sloping hillside at an altitude of approximately 3,800 meters (12,500 ft), overlooking neighboring villages and agricultural fields. The village and the surrounding land of Phuwa Goan in the Chhonhup Valley are historically the property of the Lo Gyalpo.

Thingkar Palace

Thingkar Palace (also spelled Thinggar; Tibetan: ཐིང་དགར།) is a historic royal summer residence located in the village of Thinggar. It was traditionally used by the kings of Lo (Mustang) and served as a center of administration, dispute resolution, and ceremonial life during the monarchy.
