= Lomanthang Rural Municipality =

Lo Manthang लोमान्थाङ
- Rural municipality
- Barley and Buckwheat fields of Lomangthang, Upper Mustang.
- Nickname: The Walled City
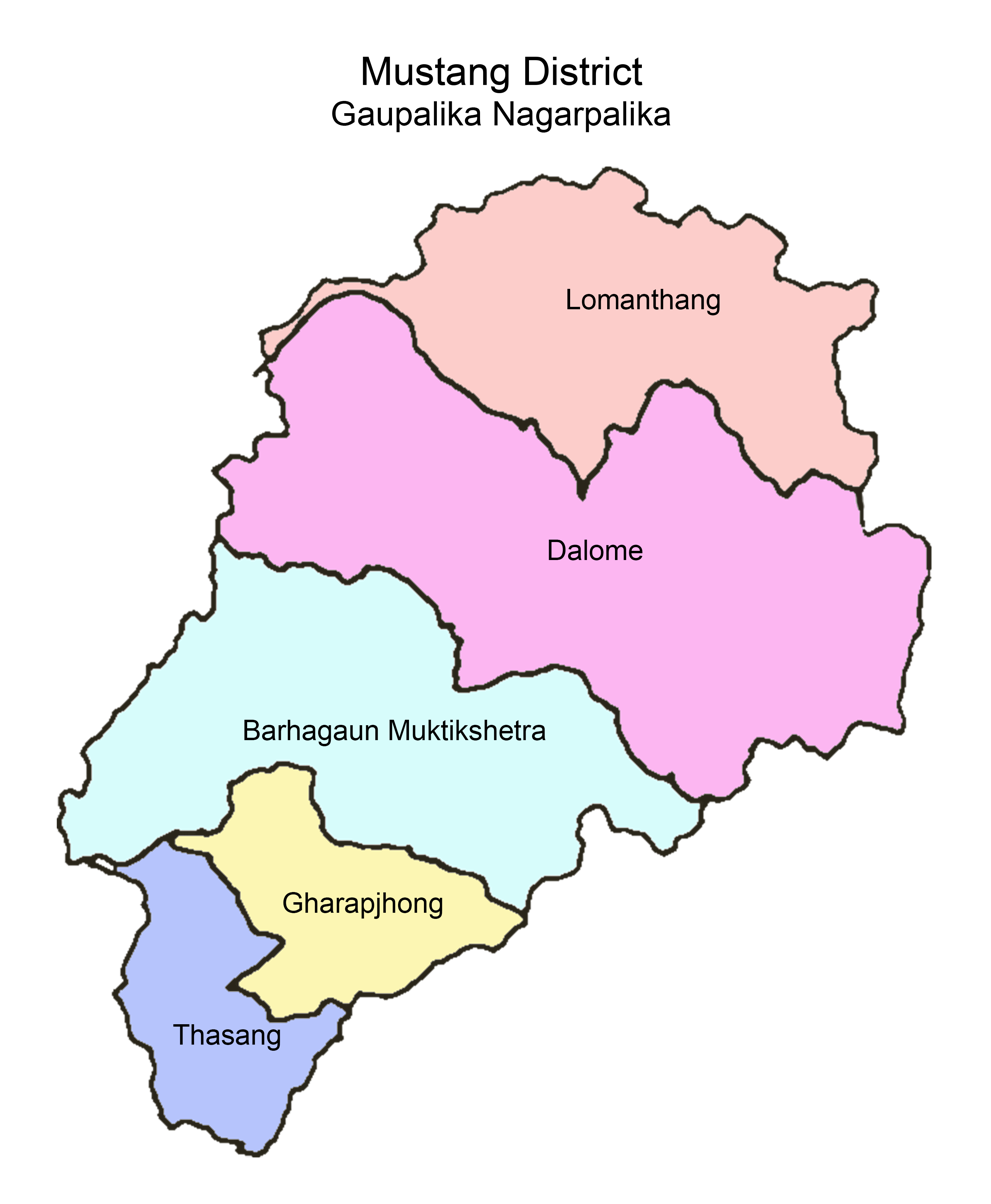
- Lomanthang (the uppermost part of Mustang district)

- Location in Gandaki Province Lo Manthang (Nepal)
- Coordinates: 29°10′59″N 83°57′24″E
- Country: Nepal
- Province: Gandaki Province
- District: Mustang
- Settled: 1380
- Established (rural municipality): 10 March 2017

Government
  - Type: Rural council
  - Body: Lomanthang Rural Council
  - Chairperson: Suwarn Kumar Bist (NC)
  - Deputy-Chairperson: Pema Dolma Bist (NC)

Area
  - Total: 727 km^{2} (281 sq mi)
- Elevation: 3,840 m (12,600 ft)

Population (2011)
  - Total: 1,899
  - Density: 2.61/km^{2} (6.77/sq mi)
- Time zone: UTC+5:45 (NST)
- Website: lomanthangmun.gov.np

Lomanthang (Nepali: लोमान्थाङ) is a rural municipality in Mustang district in Gandaki Province of western Nepal. It is located at the northern end of the district, bordering the Tibet Autonomous Region of China to the north and Lo-Ghekar Damodarkunda rural municipality of Mustang in the south.

Lo is the northern two-thirds of Mustang district, culturally and linguistically influenced by Tibet, while the southern third is called Thak, the homeland of Thakali people who speak a different language and have a synthesis of Tibetan and Nepalese culture. In 2007, a series of at least twelve caves were discovered north of Annapurna and near the village, decorated with ancient Buddhist paintings and set in sheer cliffs at an elevation of 14,000 feet (4,300 m). The paintings show Newari influence, dating to approximately the 13th century, and also contain Tibetan scripts executed in ink, silver and gold and pre-Christian era pottery shards. Explorers found stupas, decorative art and paintings depicting various forms of the Buddha, often with disciples, supplicants and attendants, with some mural paintings showing sub-tropical themes containing palm trees, billowing Indian textiles and birds.

== History ==
Lo Manthang was the walled capital of the Kingdom of Lo from its founding in 1380 by Ame Pal who oversaw construction of the city wall and many of the still-standing structures. After the Shahs of Gorkha unified Nepal out of numerous petty kingdoms in the 18th century, Lo became a dependency but kept its hereditary rulers. This arrangement continued as long as Nepal remained a kingdom, until the country was declared a republic in 2008 and Jigme Dorje Palbar Bista (r. 1964–2008) was stripped of his title. His suzerain King Gyanendra suffered the same fate, however the raja or gyelpo of Mustang was 25th in a direct line of rulers dating back to 1380 AD. Gyanendra was only the eleventh Shah ruler since Prithvi Narayan Shah conquered Kathmandu in 1768.

More prosaically, Lo Manthang became a village development committee in Mustang district of Dhawalagiri zone. The 1991 census counted 876 people living in 178 households in the VDC. The population includes ethnic Lhobas.

== Demographics ==
At the time of the 2011 Nepal census, Lomanthang Rural Municipality had a population of 2,350. Of these, 87.5% spoke Lhopa, 7.0% Gurung, 3.6% Nepali, 1.2% Magar and 0.7% other languages as their first language.

In terms of ethnicity/caste, 87.6% were Lhopa, 7.1% Gurung, 2.3% Thakuri, 1.5% Magar and 1.5% others.

In terms of religion, 92.8% were Buddhist and 7.1% Hindu.

In terms of literacy, 40.1% could read and write, 2.1% could only read and 57.7% could neither read nor write.

At the time of the 2021 Nepal census, the population of Lomanthang Rural Municipality had declined to 1,430, comprising 643 males (45.0%) and 787 females (55.0%), with a literacy rate of 47.15%.

== Administration ==
The total area of the Lo Manthang rural municipality is 727 square kilometres (281 mi^{2}) and the total population according to the 2011 census is 1899. The rural municipality is divided into 5 wards.

Previously Lomanthang was a village development committee which was upgraded into a rural municipality merging adjoining VDCs of Chhoser and Chhonhup. The rural municipality came into existence on 10 March 2017, fulfilling the requirement of the new Constitution of Nepal 2015 when the Ministry of Federal Affairs and General Administration replaced all old VDCs and municipalities into 753 new local level bodies.

Lo Manthang is 20 kilometres (12 mi) by unpaved road from a border crossing into Zhongba County of Shigatse Prefecture, TAR. This road continues about 50 kilometres (31 mi) from the border to China National Highway 219, which follows the valley of the Yarlung Tsangpo River.

The Kaligandaki Corridor, a road built by the Government of Nepal running north along the Kali Gandaki River, now connects Lo Manthang to the Korala border crossing itself, cutting travel time from Pokhara to around one day. As of 2025, much of this stretch remained an unpaved gravel road, with full blacktopping of the wider corridor project targeted for completion by fiscal year 2026–27. There are also scheduled flights from Kathmandu and Pokhara to Jomsom Airport, located 50 kilometres (31 mi) south of Lo Manthang.

== Tourism and access ==
The village is noted for its tall whitewashed mud-brick walls, gompas and the Raja's or Royal or King's Palace, a nine-cornered, five-story structure built around 1400. There are four major temples: Jampa Lhakhang or Jampa Gompa, the oldest, built in the early 15th century and also known as the "God house"; Thubchen Gompa, a huge, red assembly hall and gompa built in the late 15th century and located just southwest of Jampa Gompa; Chodey Gompa, now the main city gompa; and the Choprang Gompa, which is popularly known as the "New Gompa".

Even though foreign visitors have been allowed in the kingdom since 1992, tourism to Upper Mustang remains limited, with just over 2000 foreign tourists in 2008.

The Nepalese Department of Immigration requires foreign visitors to obtain a special permit, which costs $50 per day per person, and liaison (guide) to protect local tradition from outside influence as well as to protect their environment.

== 2015 Earthquake ==
The April 2015 Nepal earthquake caused multiple cracks in the 600-year-old Lo Manthang Royal Palace.

== Gallery ==
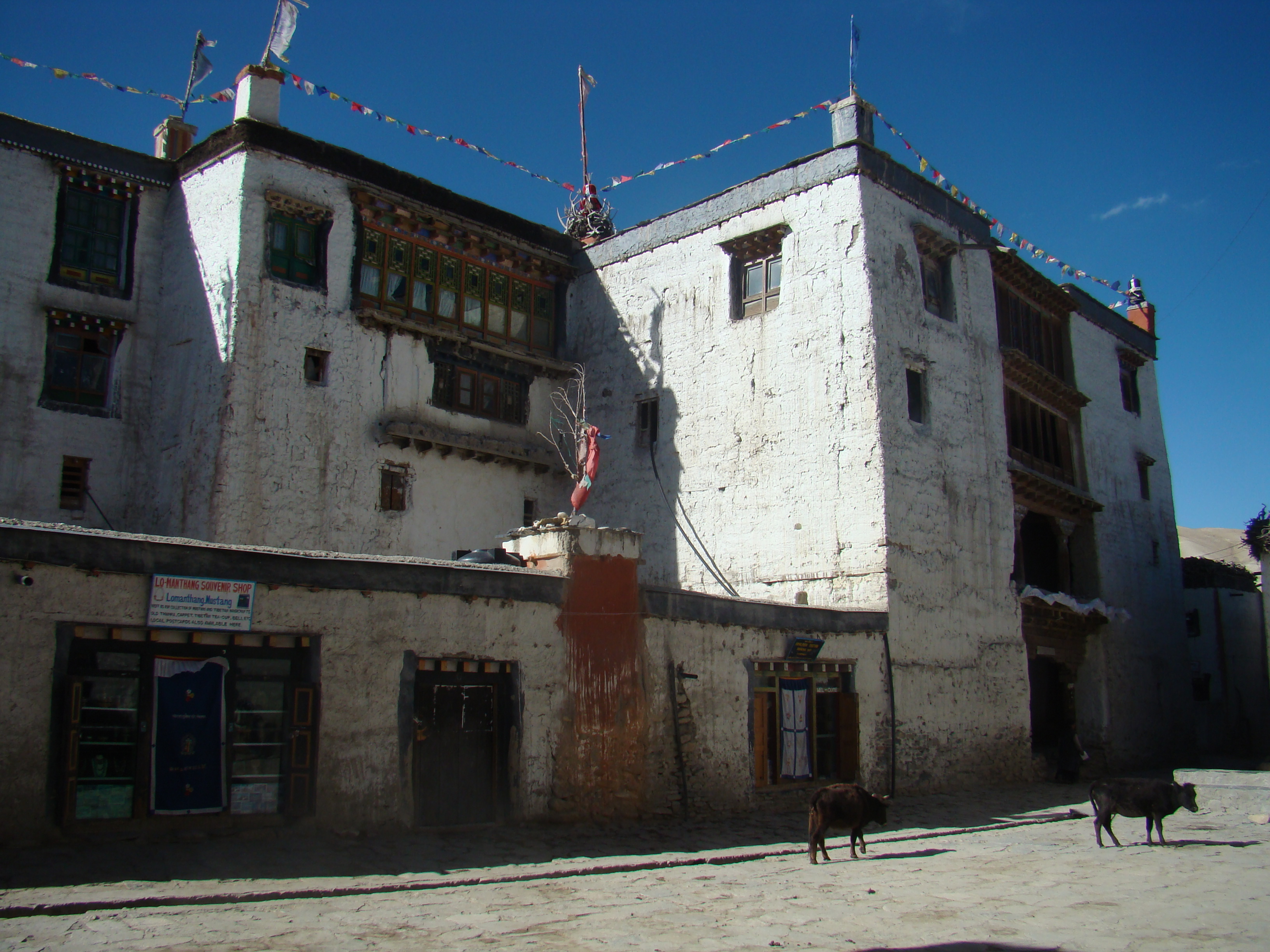
The Royal Palace in Lo Manthang

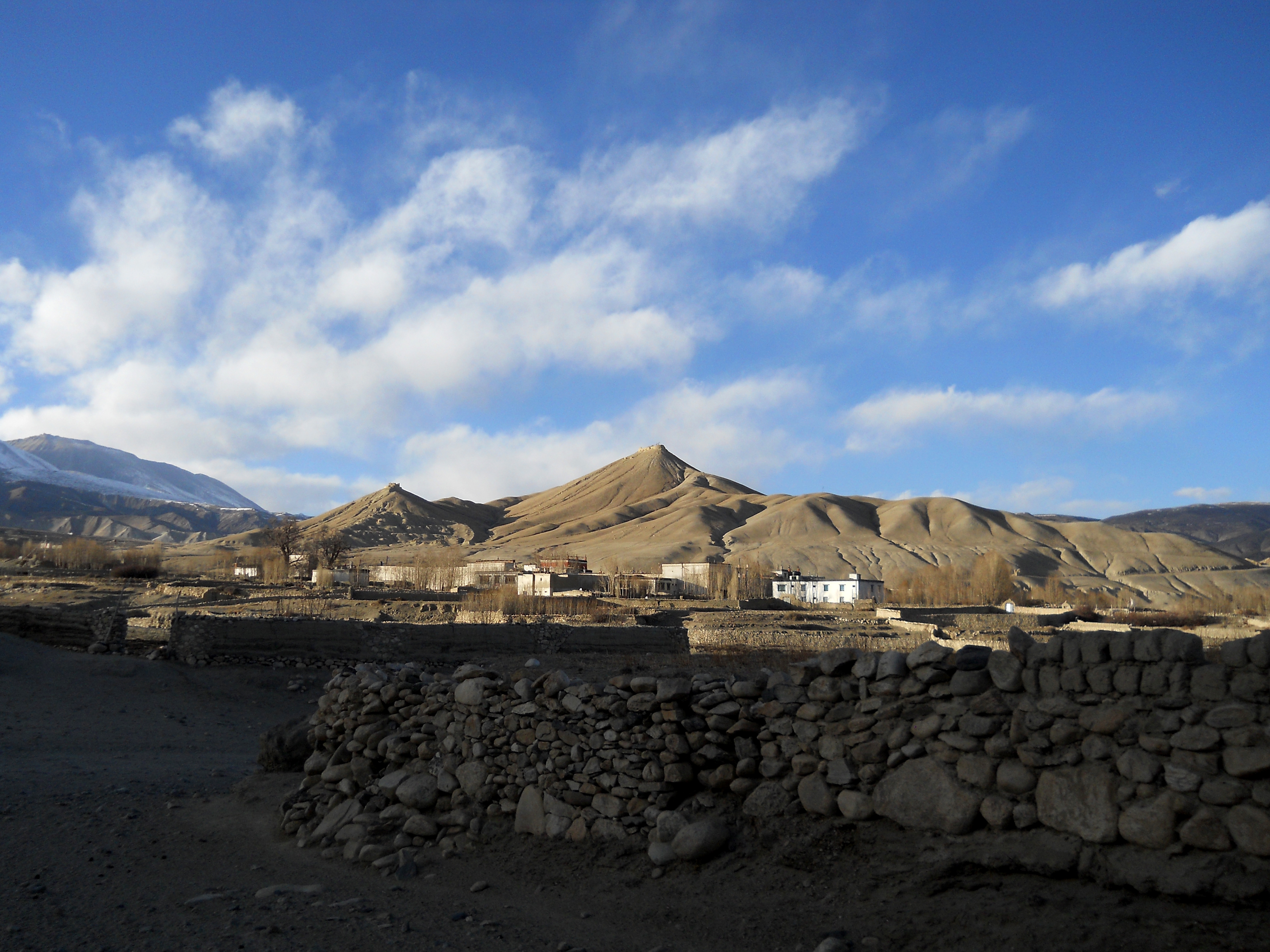
Lo Manthang

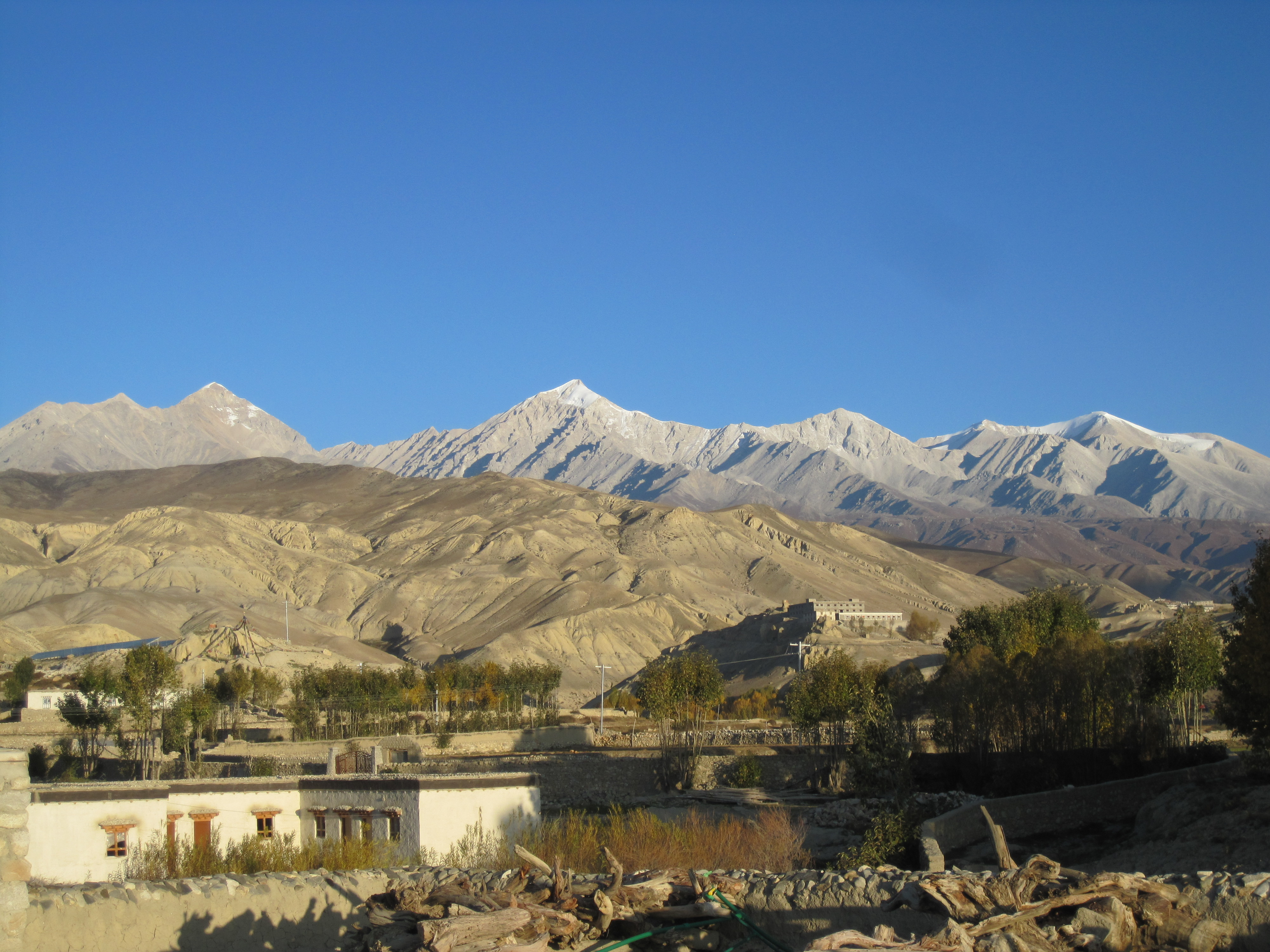
The settlement of Lo Manthang

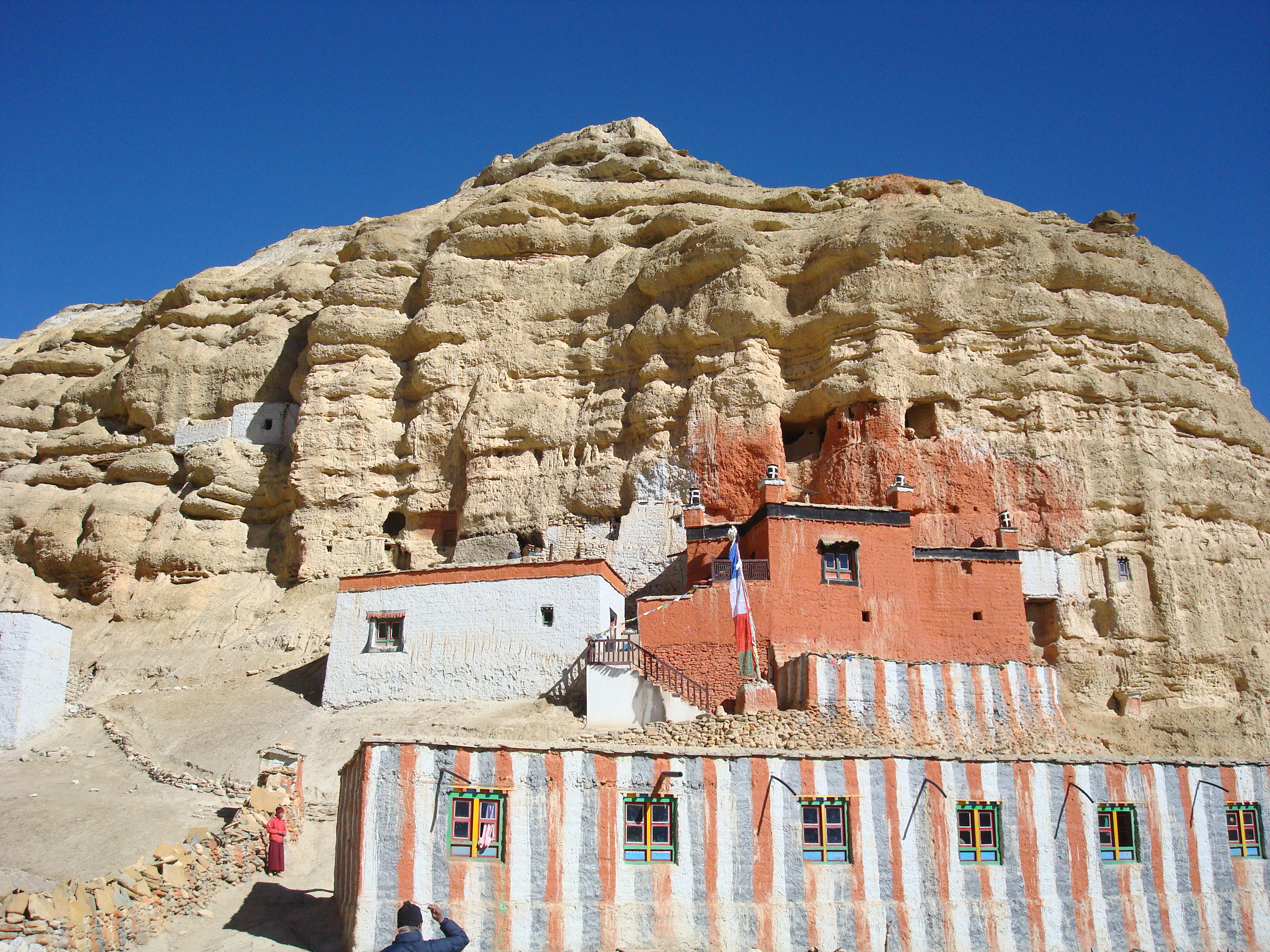
Nepal Tourism Center, Upper Mustang

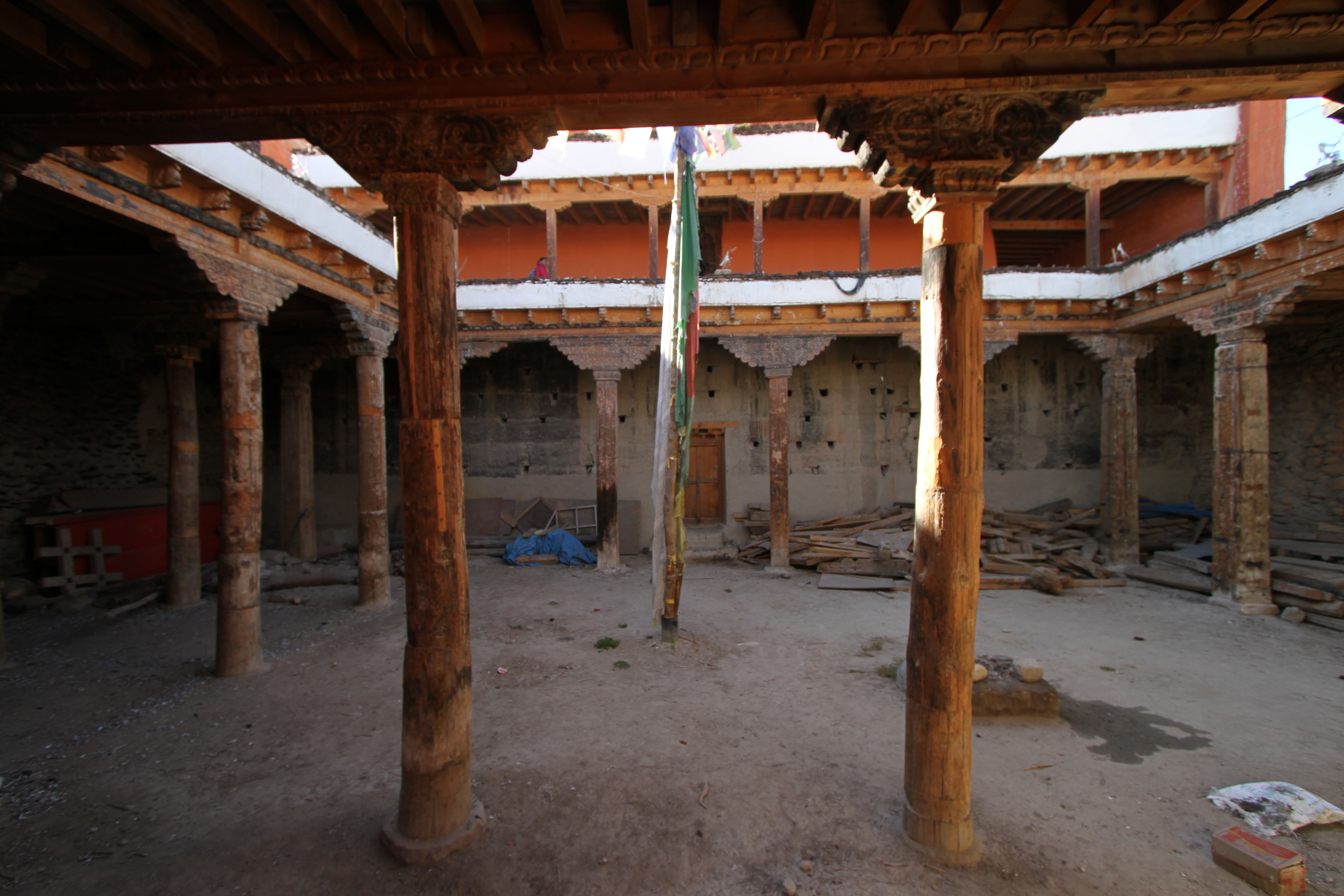
Jampa Lhakhang

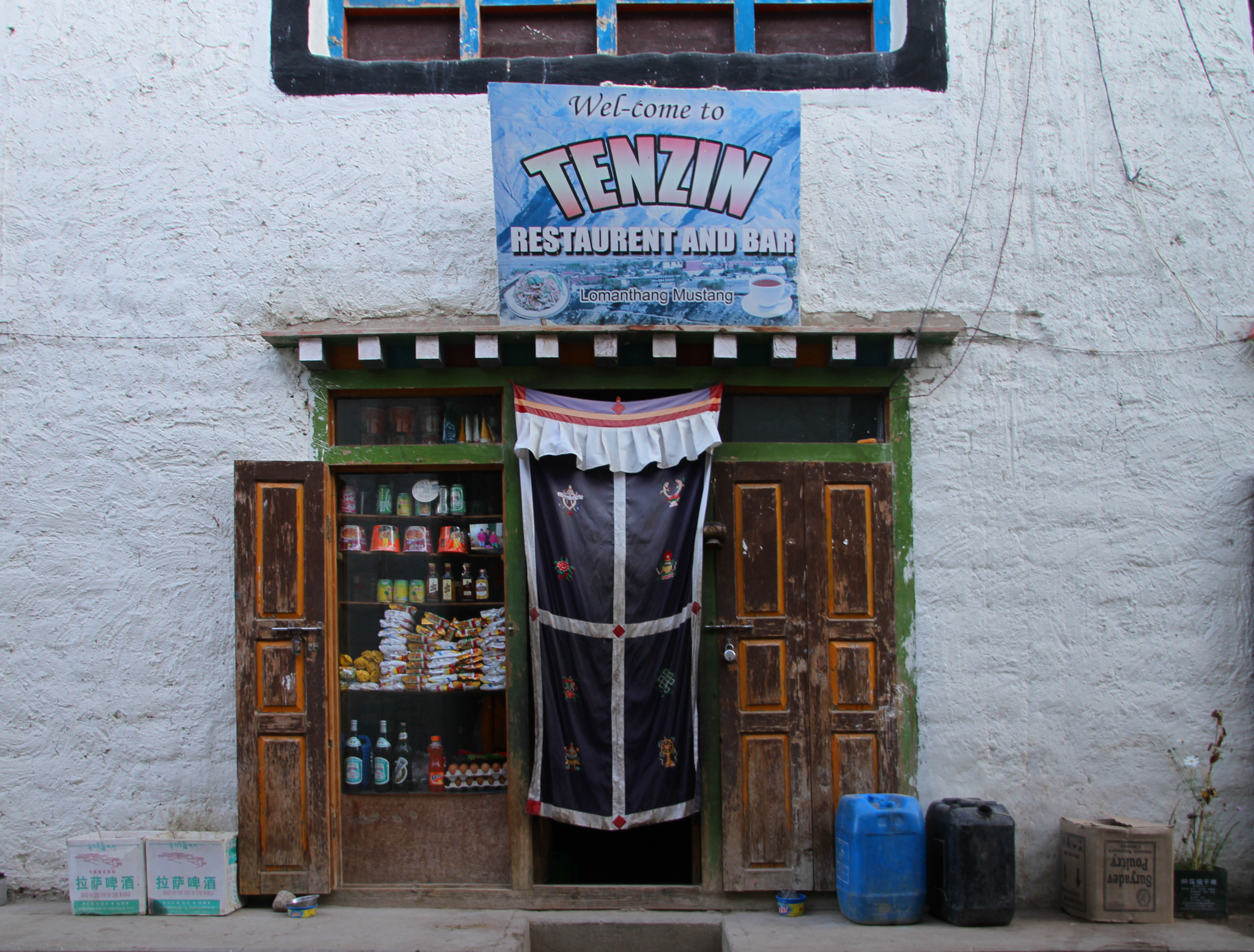
Shop

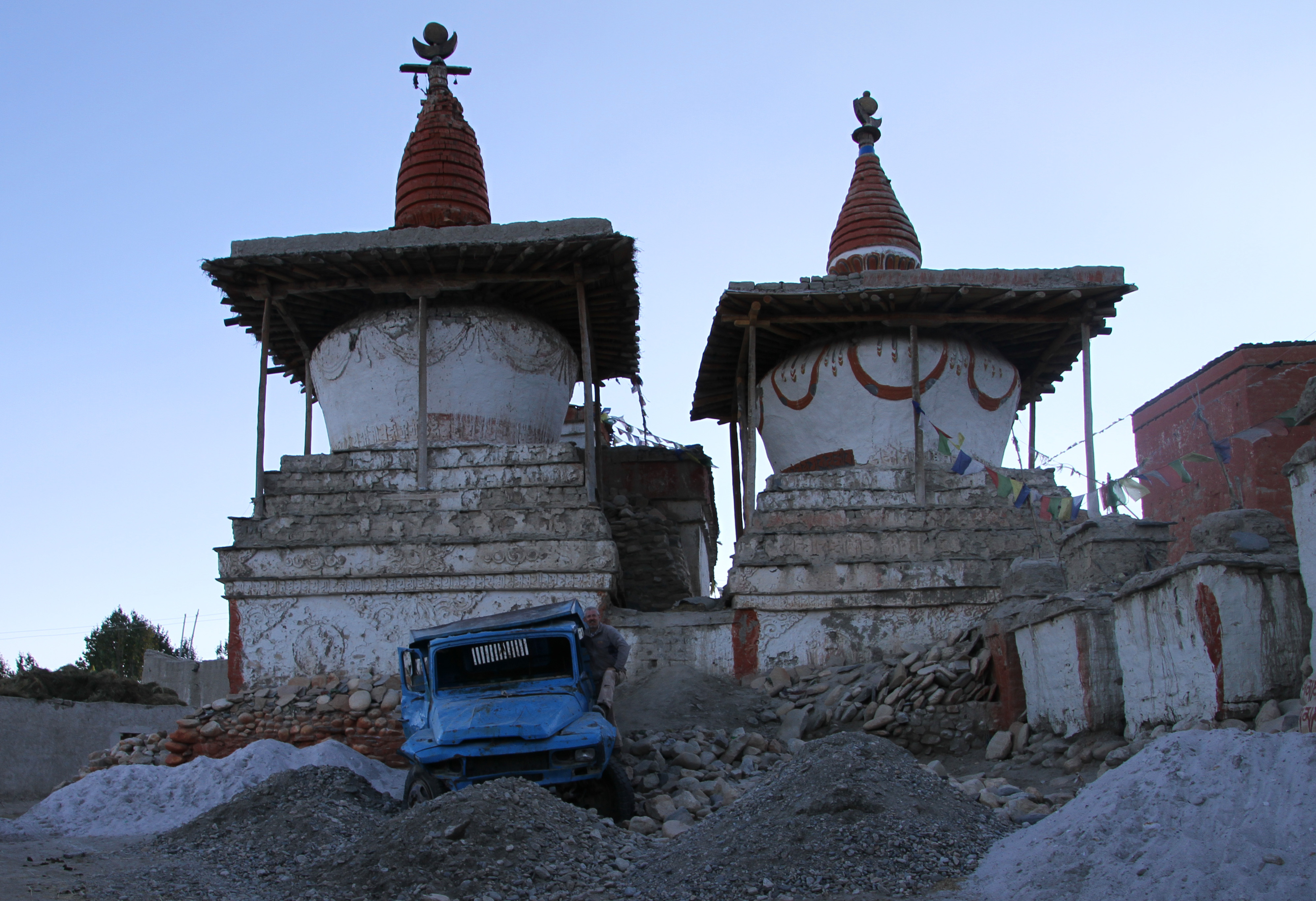
Choerten

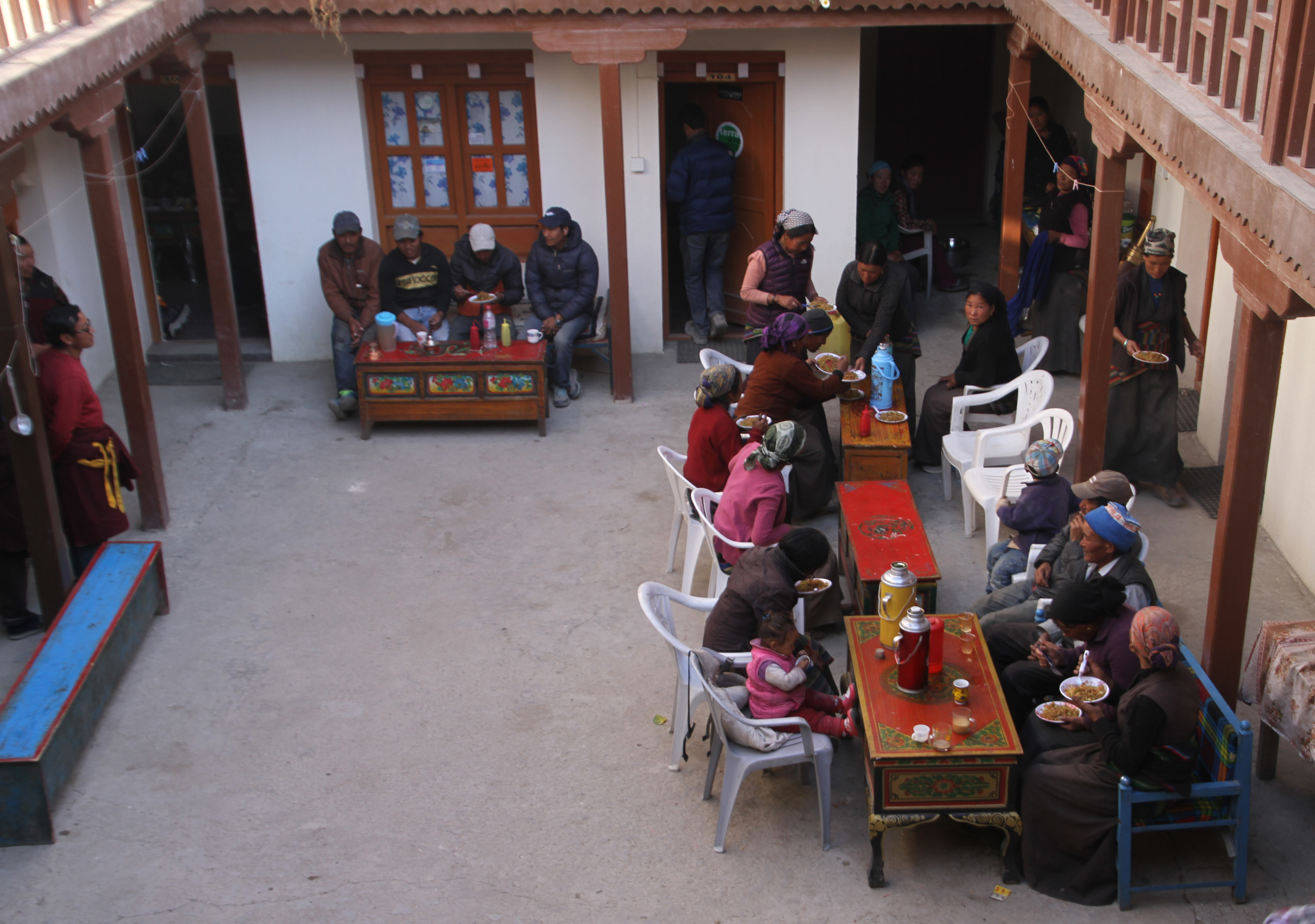
Lotus Holiday Inn

== See also ==
- Upper Mustang
- Mustang District
- Mustang Caves
- Kali Gandaki River

== Bibliography ==
- Maïe Kitamura, La cité fortifiée de Lo Manthang, Mustang, Nord du Népal. Paris, Éditions Recherches, 2011. 214 plans & drawings, photography. ISBN 978-2-86222-077-2.
