= Thingkar Palace =

Historic palace in Thinggar, Nepal

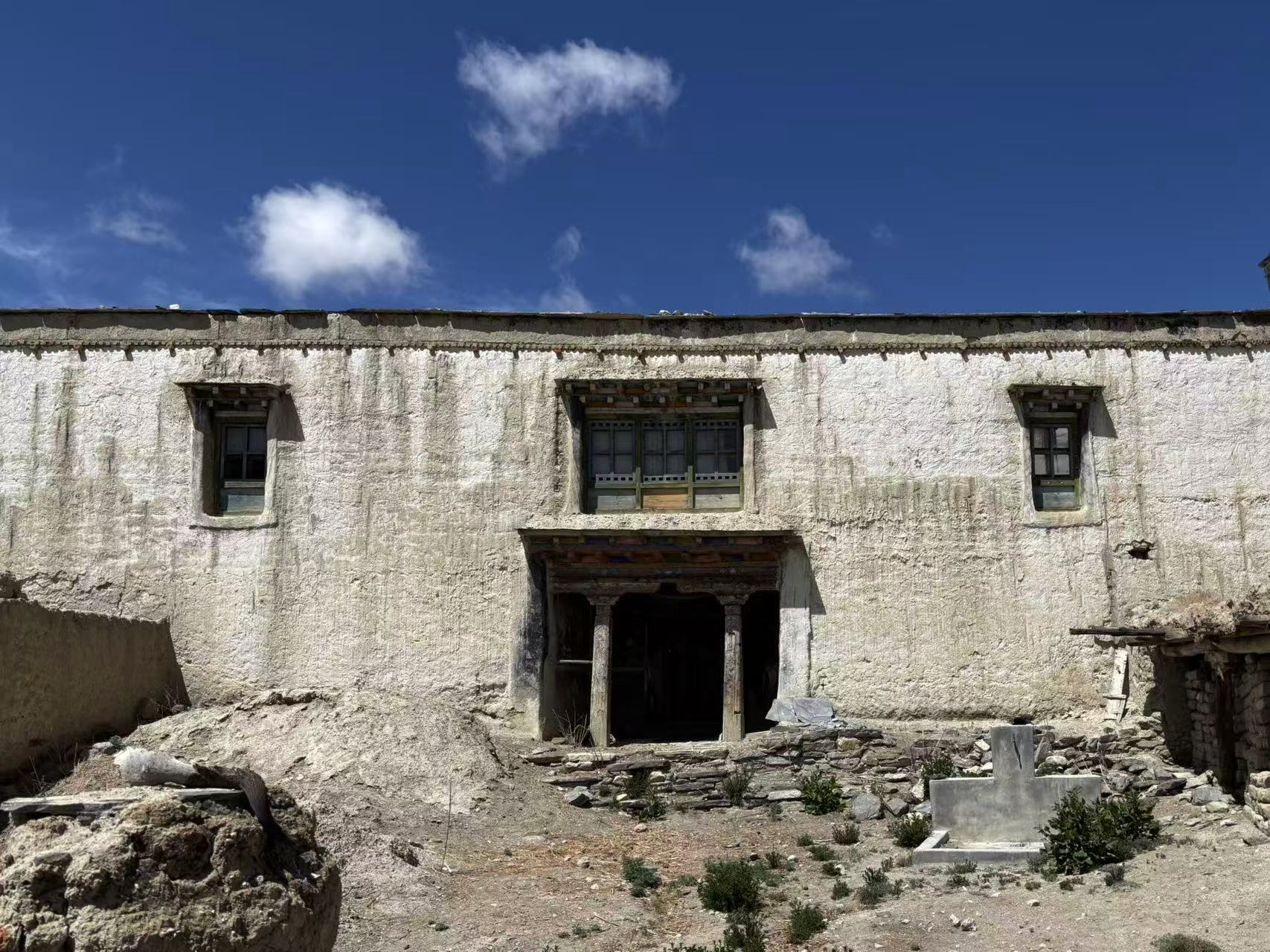
Thinggar Palace

Thingkar Palace (Tibetan: ཐིང་དགར།, also spelled Thinggar, Trehkar) is a historic palace located in the village of Thinggar in the Chhonhup Valley of Upper Mustang, Nepal. The palace served as a residence for the kings of Lo Mustang and functioned as a center for administration and ceremonial activities during the monarchy.

== Early history ==
Thinggar is located in the Chhonhup Valley, the western valley of Lo Manthang. The settlement and surrounding land of Phuwa Goan have historically been associated with the Lo Gyalpo (King of Mustang). Prior to the 19th century, Thinggar and its environs were ruled by a noble family whose origins are traced back to the 14th-century Gung-thang period. This lineage maintained considerable autonomy from the royal court in Lo Manthang.

The King at Lo Manthang eventually consolidated control over the Thinggar region. By the early 20th century, the village of Thinggar and much of the land in the Chhonhup Valley had become the direct property of the monarchy.

== Royal marriage and construction ==
In 1917, Rani Kelsang Choeden, of the Zhalu Kushang family of the Che clan and elder sister of the 18th Chogye Trichen Rinpoche, married the Mustang king, Angun Tenzing Trandul. The marriage was arranged by the Mustang royal steward, Pema Wandhrup, with involvement from the Tibetan Kashag government.

Following this marriage, renovation of monasteries and construction of new palaces began. The Thinggar Palace was built during this period, between 1930 and 1940. King Angun Tenzing Trandul resided there until his death in the palace in 1964.

== Modern era ==
The palace was damaged in the 2015 Nepal earthquake. Restoration efforts began in 2019 with support from heritage conservation initiatives. The site has been incorporated into cultural tourism and heritage projects in Mustang.

== Architecture ==
Thinggar Palace exemplifies the Tibetan-influenced vernacular architecture found in Upper Mustang. The construction features thick stone and mud-brick walls, inward-sloping façades, and black-framed windows. The palace includes courtyards and ceremonial spaces designed for assemblies and administrative functions.

The palace is positioned on a sloping hillside at approximately 3,800 meters (12,500 ft) elevation, overlooking the valley floor. This location provided strategic advantages and follows design principles common in Tibetan palace architecture.

== Function ==
The palace served as a residence for the Lo Gyalpo and functioned as an administrative center. During the monarchy, disputes and community matters were brought to Thinggar for resolution under royal authority. In addition, the 18th Chogye Trichen Rinpoche resided in the north wing during the 70s, a space that will be renovated into a puja room in memory of the great master.
