= Upper Mustang =

Northern area of Mustang District, Nepal

Coordinates: 29°05′N 83°55′E

Kingdom of Lo / Mustang གློ་ཡུལ། གློ་སྨན་ཐང་། (Tibetan) मुस्ताङ राज्य (Nepali)
- 1380–2008
- Flag

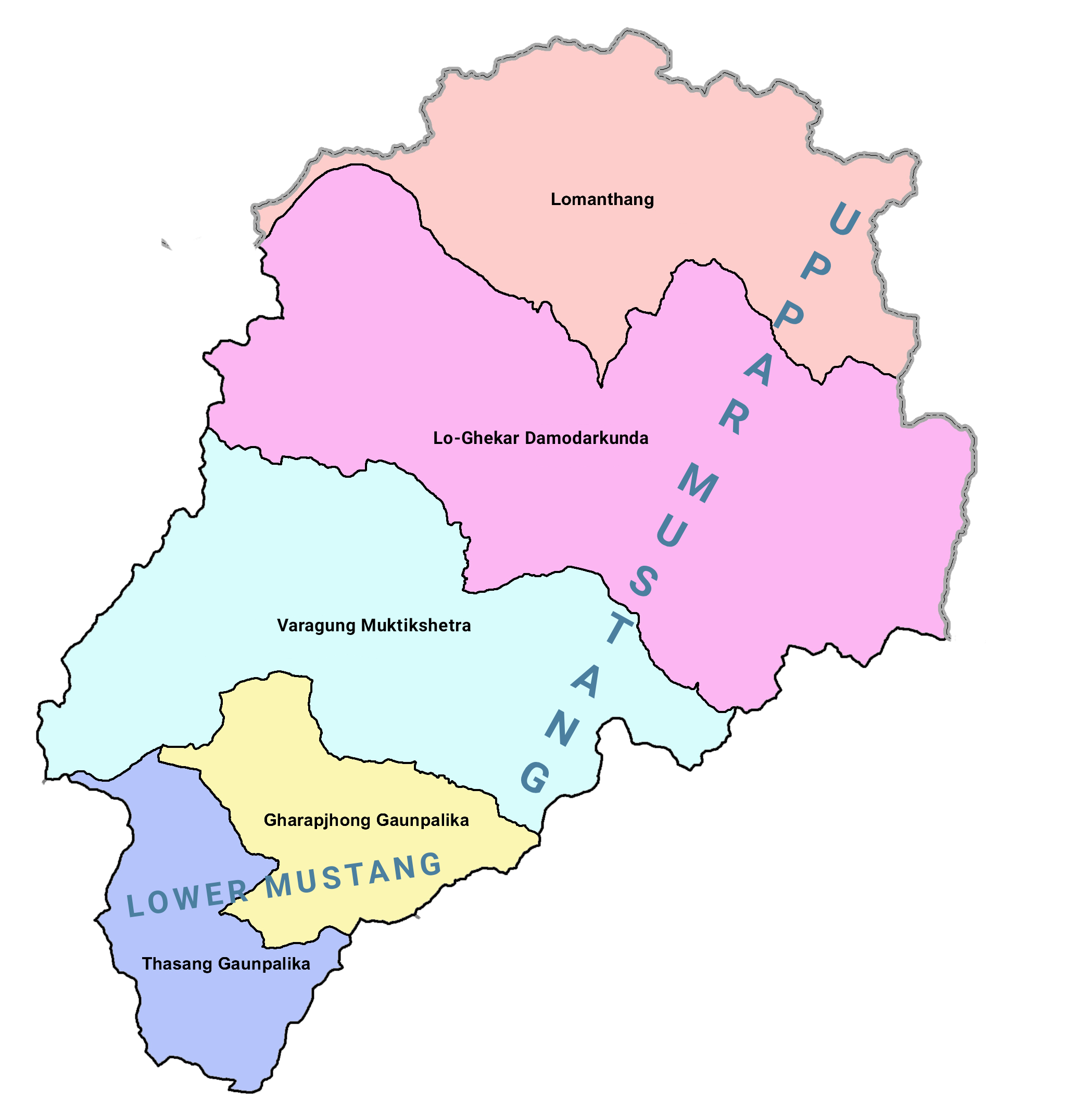
- Upper & lower Mustang with local level bodies
- Status: Independent sovereign state (1380–1964); Dependency of Nepal (1964–2008)
- Capital: Lo Manthang
- Official languages: Tibetan and Nepali
- Religion: Hinduism; Tibetan Buddhism; Kiratism; Animism; Nepalese Shamanism
- Government: Monarchy
- Raja/Gyelpo (King)
  - 1380–1400s (first): Ame Pal
  - 1964–2008 (last): Jigme Dorje Palbar Bista
- History
  - Established: 1380
  - Abolished by the Federal government: 7 October 2008

Area
  - Total: 2,020 km^{2} (780 sq mi)

Population
  - Estimate: 7,000
  - Density: 3.47/km^{2} (9.0/sq mi)
Succeeded by
Mustang District
- Today part of: Nepal

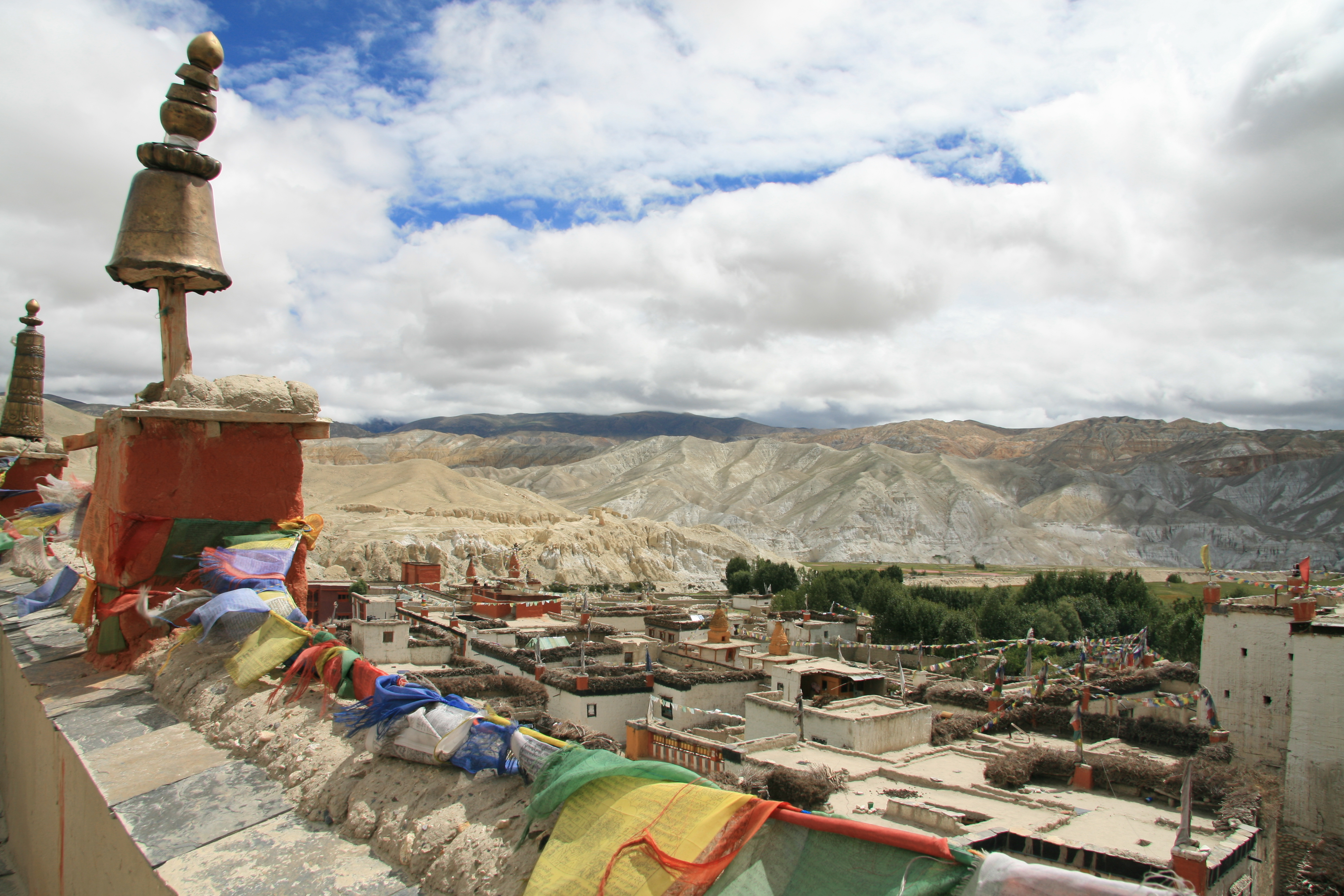
Lo Manthang

Upper Mustang or Lo Tsho Dyun, formerly known as Kingdom of Lo, is the upper part (northern areas) of the Mustang District in the Gandaki Province of Nepal. The Upper Mustang was a closed territory until 1992, off limits to outsiders, making it one of the most culturally-preserved regions in the world, with a majority of the population still speaking traditional Tibetic languages.

The historical Upper Mustang comprises the northern third of the Mustang District of Gandaki Province, Nepal. It consists of two rural municipalities namely Lo Manthang and Lo-Ghekar Damodarkunda.

The region between Cheile and Pandakhola is called Baragau. The people in the upper part of Baragau (Chusang, Tangbe, Tetang, Gyaka and Cheile villages) and Thak retain their original Seke language, the people of the Kagbeni and Muktinath areas speak a West Tibetan dialect. The trekking permit for "Upper Mustang" consists of Lo Manthang and Baragau regions, leading to confusion that Baragau lies within Upper Mustang.

The southern third (lower Mustang) of the district is called Thak and is the homeland of the Thakali community, who speak the Thakali language and whose culture combines Tibetan and Nepalese elements.

Tibetan culture of the region has been preserved by the relative isolation of the region from the outside world. Life in Mustang revolves around tourism, animal husbandry, and trade.

Mustang's status as a kingdom ended in 2008 when its suzerain Kingdom of Nepal became a republic. The influence of the outside world, especially China, is growing and contributing to rapid change in the lives of Mustang's people. Development work has increased in recent years.

== History ==
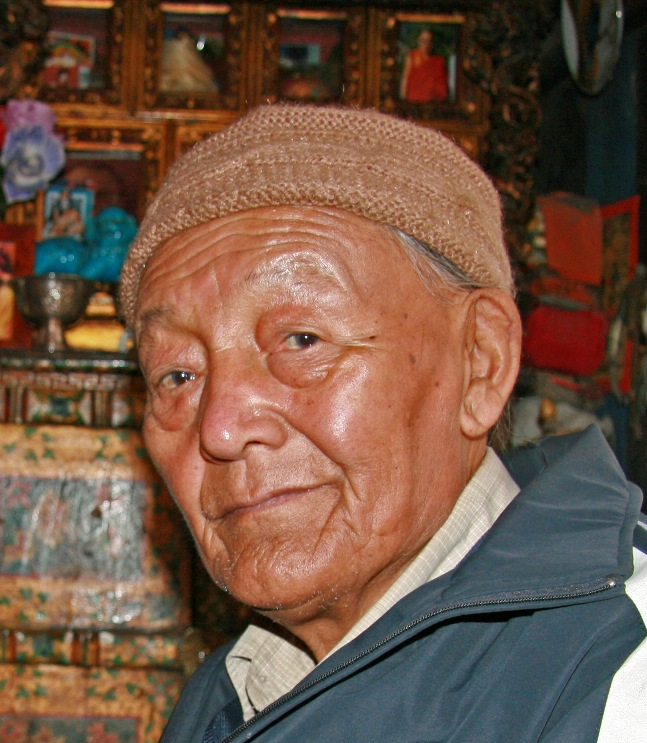
Raja Jigme Dorje Palbar Bista.

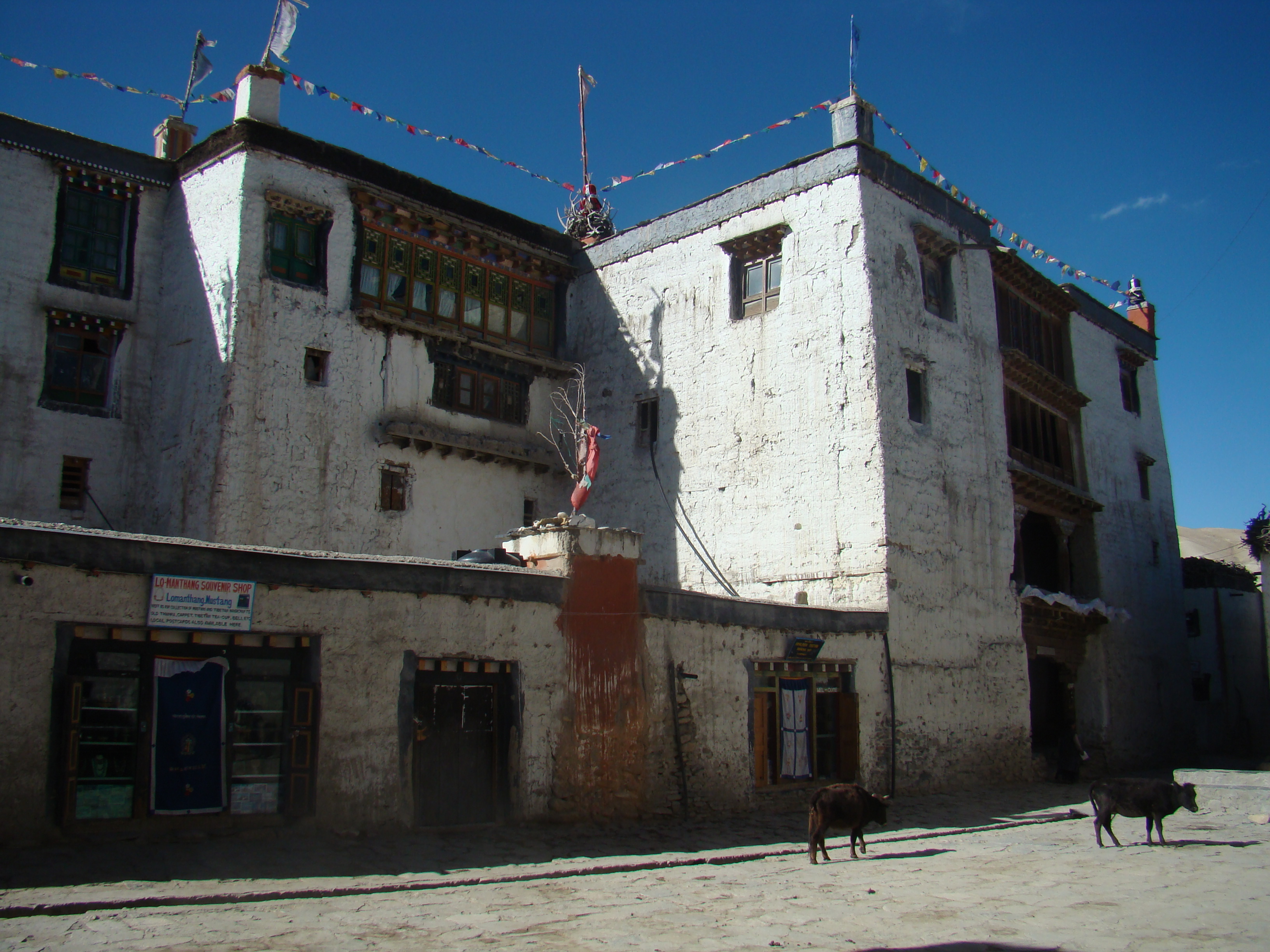
Lo Manthang Palace.

Mustang was once an independent kingdom, although closely tied by language and culture to Tibet. From the 15th to the 17th century, its strategic location granted Mustang control over the trade between the Himalayas and India. At the end of the 18th century, the kingdom was annexed by Nepal and became a dependency of the Kingdom of Nepal in 1795.

The Kingdom of Lo Manthang supported Tibet and the Qing Empire during the Sino-Nepalese War.

Though still recognized by many Mustang residents, the monarchy ceased to exist on October 7, 2008, by order of the Government of Nepal. The last official and later unofficial king (raja or gyelpo) was Jigme Dorje Palbar Bista (1930–2016), who traced his lineage directly back to Ame Pal, the warrior who founded this Buddhist kingdom in 1380. Ame Pal oversaw the founding and building of much of the Lo and Mustang capital of Lo Manthang, a walled city that has changed little in appearance since that time.

In 2007, a shepherd in Mustang discovered a collection of 55 cave paintings depicting the life of the Buddha.

== Royal Family ==
King Jigme Dorje Palbar Bista was born in Lo-Manthang Palace in Upper Mustang in the Himalayan Range of Nepal. He was the third son of King Angun Tenzing Trandul, King of Mustang, by his wife, Queen Kelsang Choeden of the Zhalu Kushang family of the Che clan. She was the elder sister of Ngawang Khyenrab Thupten Lekshe Gyatso, the 18th Chogye Trichen Rinpoche. The Zhalu Kushang family of the Che clan is a distinguished aristocratic lineage from the Tsang region of Tibet. Historically, they were lords of the Zhalu area during the Yuan dynasty (13th–14th centuries) and were known for their patronage of Buddhist monasteries, including Zhalu Monastery, Ngor Monastery, and Nalendra Monastery. Their name, "Kushang," meaning "royal maternal uncle," reflects their significant role in Tibetan nobility, particularly through intermarriages with Sakya throne holders.

Jigme Dorje ascended the throne after the death of his elder brother, Angdu Nyingpo. King Angdu Nyingpo had married a Tibetan aristocrat, and the couple had two daughters. With King Angdu Nyingpo leaving only two daughters his eldest, Lo Semla (Princess) Chimi Dolkar Palbar Bista, and a younger daughter whose name is unrecorded and no male heir, the throne passed to his younger brother, Jigme Dorje.

King Jigme Dorje married a noble lady from Shigatse, Tibet, Sahiba Sidol in the 1950s. They had one son, Angun Tenzin, who died at the age of 8, and later adopted his nephew, Jigme Singhe as heir.

== Trans-Himalayan Marital Alliances ==
The Mustang royal family has forged marriage alliances with prominent Tibetan aristocratic families reinforcing their longstanding regional ties over the centuries. Today, members of the royal family are dispersed across Upper Mustang, Kathmandu, San Francisco, Melbourne, and Tibet.

== Climate ==
Upper Mustang has a trans-Himalayan climate which is cool and semi-arid with precipitation in the range of 250–400 mm (9.8–15.7 in). It is in the rain shadow of the Annapurna and Dhaulagiri ranges.

The Day and Night Temperature in Upper Mustang according to the months is shown below:

Month	Day Temperature	Night Temperature
December, January, February	0 to 5 °C 32 to 41 °F	-25 to -20°C -13 to -4 °F
March, April, May, June	16 to 22 °C 61 to 72 °F	-6 to -2°C 21 to 28 °F
July, August, September	20 to 33 °C 68 to 73 °F	-3 to 0 °C 27 to 32 °F
October, November	12 to 20 °C 54 to 68 °F	-8 to -4 °C 18 to 25 °F

== Demographics ==
The population of the whole Mustang District in 2001 was 14,981, spread between three towns and approximately thirty smaller settlements. The inhabitants are either Thakalis, Gurung or, in traditional Mustang, primarily Tibetan.

Most of the population of Mustang lives near the Kali Gandaki River, 2,800 to 3,900 m (9,200 to 12,800 ft) above sea level. The tough conditions cause a large winter migration into lower regions of Nepal. The administrative center of Mustang District is at Jomsom (eight kilometres (5.0 mi) south of Kagbeni) which has had an airport since 1962 and has become the main tourist entry point since Mustang was opened to western tourism in 1992.

== Geography ==
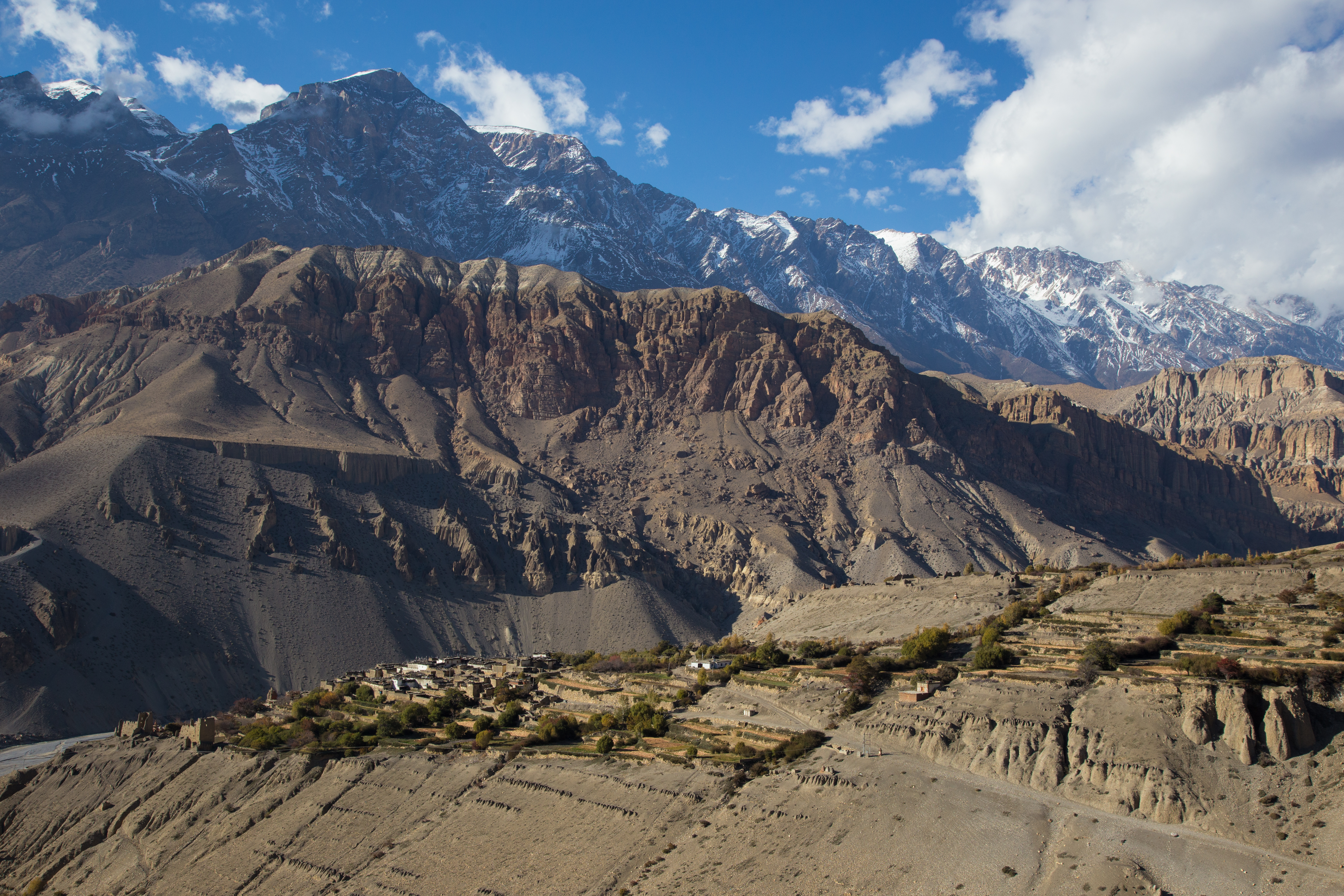
Tangbe village from above

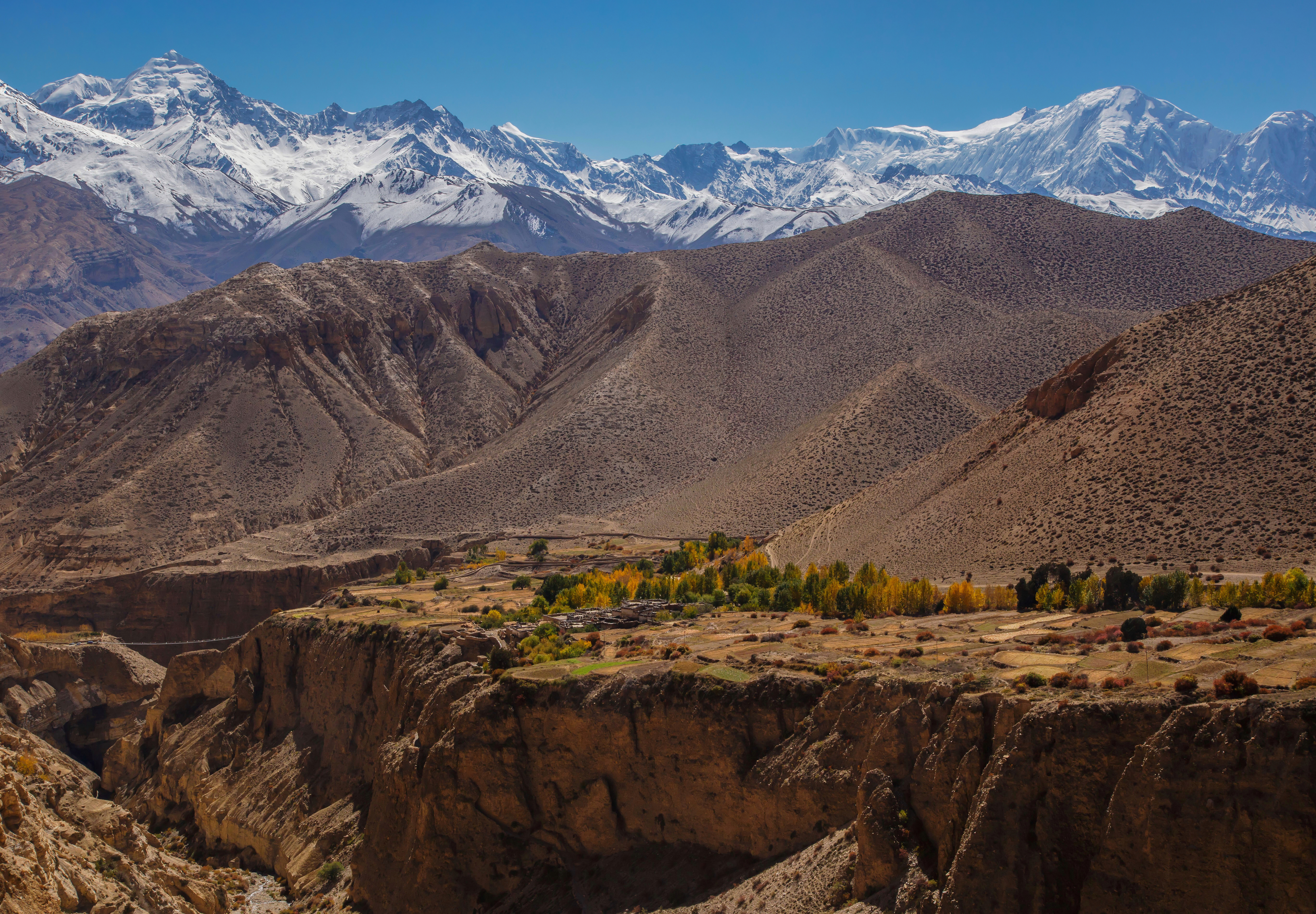
Gyakar village across the gorge

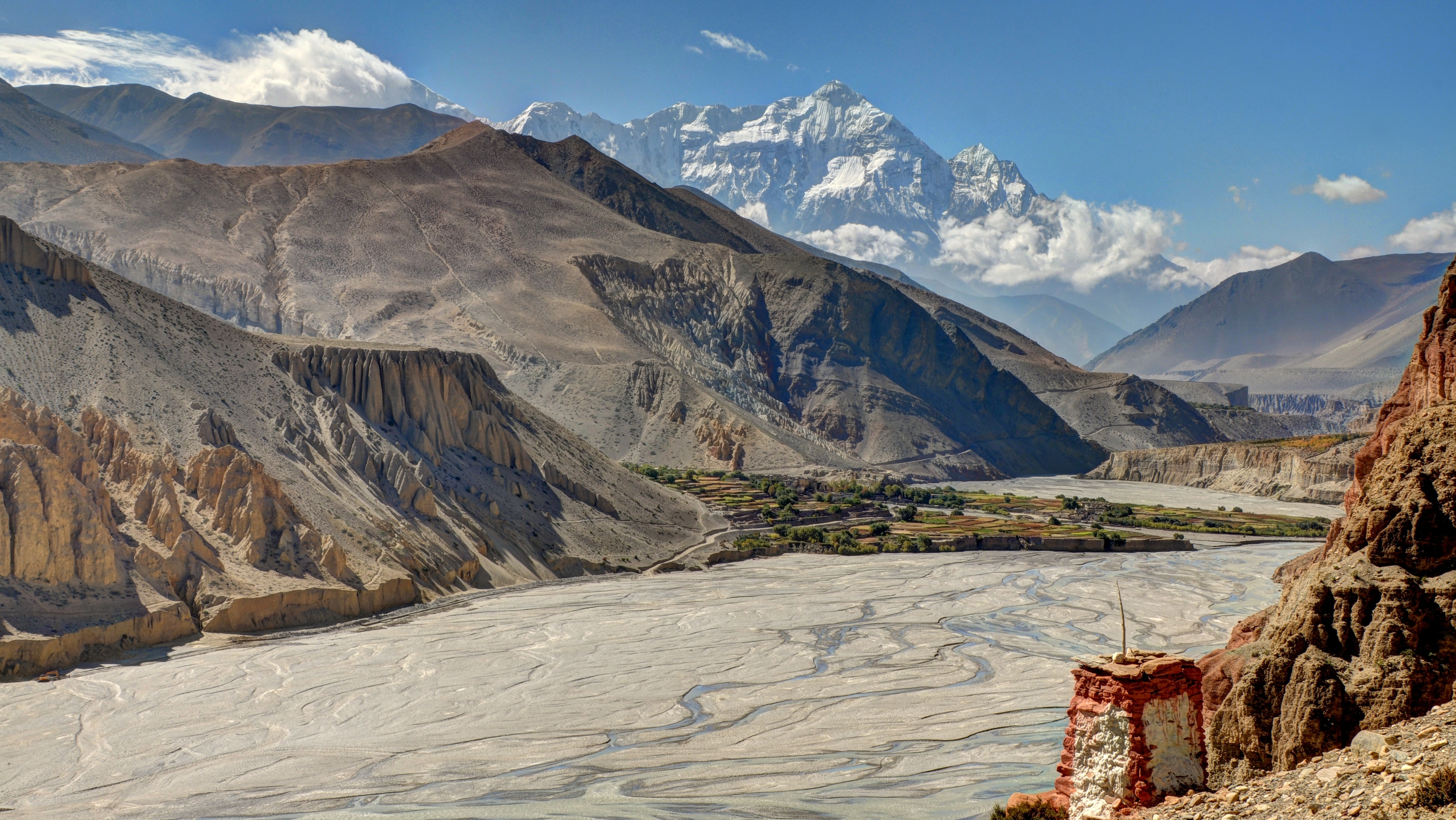
Kali Gandaki riverbed in Nepal's Upper Mustang. View from Thsele down to the Kali Gandaki river and the fields of Chusang village, with Nilgiri's steep north face.

The main hydrographic feature of Mustang is the Gandaki River. The river runs southward towards Nepal Terai, bisecting Mustang. Routes paralleling the river once served as a major trade route between Tibet and India, especially for salt. Part of the river valley in the southern Mustang District forms the Kali Gandaki Gorge, by some measures the deepest gorge in the world.

Traditional Mustang (the Lo Kingdom) is 53 km (33 mi) north–south at its longest, 60 km (37 mi) east–west at its widest and ranges from a low point of 2,750 m (9,020 ft) above sea level on the Kali Gandaki River just north of Kagbeni to 6,700 m (22,000 ft) at Khamjung Himal, a peak in southeast Mustang.

== Transport ==
Upper Mustang is on an ancient trade route between Nepal and Tibet exploiting the lowest 4,660-metre (15,300 ft) pass Kora La through the Himalaya west of Sikkim. Kora La currently serves as one of the active border crossings between China and Nepal.

Mechanized access inside Nepal began with the opening of an airstrip at Jomsom at the approximate boundary between the southern Thak and northern Lo sections of the valley, which was in operation by the 1960s.

China eventually decided to revitalize trade and in 2001 completed a 20-kilometre (12 mi) road from the international border to Lo Manthang. Across the TAR border is Zhongba County of Shigatse Prefecture. China National Highway 219 follows the valley of the Yarlung Tsangpo River some 50 kilometres (31 mi) north of the border.

Meanwhile, road-building from the south was inhibited by difficulties along the Kali Gandaki Gorge to the south, but proceeded incrementally. In 2010, a nine-kilometre (6 mi) gap remained but the road was completed before 2015 and is suitable for high clearance and four wheel drive vehicles.

Currently, the easiest and only widely used road corridor, from Kathmandu to Lhasa—named Arniko Highway in Nepal and China National Highway 318 in the TAR—traverses a 5,125-metre (16,810 ft) pass. This is some 465 metres (1,530 ft) higher than Kora La.

== Tourism ==
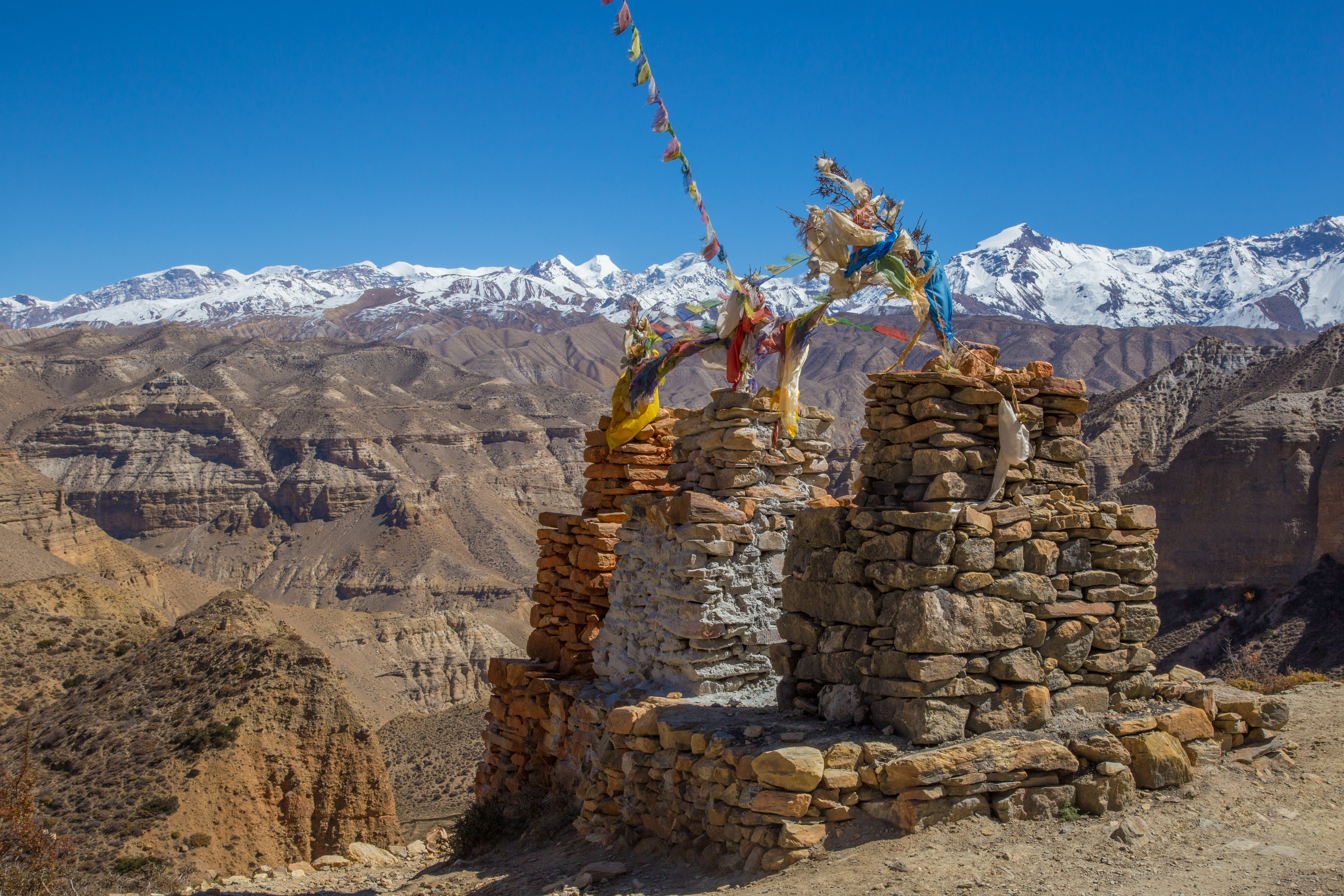
Rigsum Gönpo and Buddhist prayer flags at the entrance of Samar

Foreign visitors have been allowed to the region since 1992, but tourism to Upper Mustang is regulated. Foreigners need to obtain a special permit to enter, costing $500 for ten days, followed by $50 per day. Most tourists visit for the region's trekking trails, which largely follow the same trade route used in the 15th century, although road construction is beginning to impact the areas trekking routes. Over a thousand western trekkers now visit each year, with over 7,000 between (mid-July 2018 to mid-July 2019). August and October are the peak visiting months. On August 27, 2010, local youth leaders in Mustang threatened to bar tourists beginning October 1, 2010 due to the refusal of the Nepalese government to provide any of the $50 per day fee to the local economy. Visitation, however, continued uninterrupted beyond that date.

Mustang is rich in Tibetan Buddhist culture. It is an alternate way to experience the Tibetan culture and landscape to the tours provided by the Chinese government. The Tiji festival in Lo-Manthang is another popular destination for tourists in the area seeking to experience the native culture.

The first westerner in Mustang was Toni Hagen, Swiss explorer and geologist, who visited the Kingdom in 1952 during one of his travels across the Himalayas. French Michel Peissel is considered the first westerner to stay in Lo Manthang, during the first authorised exploration of Mustang in 1964.

== See also ==
- Jomsom Airport
- Mustang Caves
- Lo Manthang Palace

== Bibliography ==
- Michel Peissel (1967). Mustang – A lost Tibetan Kingdom. Dutton, New York.
- Clara Marullo (1995). The Last Forbidden Kingdom, Mustang: Land of Tibetan Buddhism. Photographs by Vanessa Schuurbeque. Charles E. Tuttle Co., Ltd., Rutland, Vermont. ISBN 0-8048-3061-4.
- Peter Matthiessen (1996). East of Lo Monthang – In the Land of Mustang. Photography by Thomas Laird. Shambhala Publications, Berkeley, Cal.

== Documentaries ==
- Lost Treasures of Tibet, 2003–2–18.
- The Last Lost Kingdom, a Feature Documentary by Larry Levene.
