= Lo Manthang Palace =

Old Palace in Nepal

Coordinates: 29.18273°N 83.95677°E

Lo Manthang Palace (Nepali: लोमान्थाङ दरबार) is a historical palace in Nepal. It is located in 3800 m above sea level in Lomanthang Rural Municipality of Mustang district. The palace is under consideration to be listed in UNESCO World Heritage site.

== History ==
The Lo Manthang Palace was built around the 15th Century by the first king of Mustang, Amad Pal. He first built a fortress wall around the settlement of Lo. Later, in 1440 AD, he constructed the four-storey palace. Mustang was under the influence of Jumla in the 16th to 18th centuries. When Jumla was annexed to Nepal in 1789 AD, Mustang became an integral part of Nepal along with the palace. However, the king of Mustang was recognized as a local king. In 1953 the Royal Family moved the court and their residence from Lo Manthang Palace to Thinggar Summer Palace, which is located two miles north of Lo Manthang in the Chhonghup Valley.

== Architecture ==
The palace is five storied. It is constructed in mud, stone and wood with nine corners. There are wall paintings and inscriptions in Ranjana Script. The main entrance to the palace is in the east. The palace is painted with white lime. The palace houses a collection of texts such as Kanjur, Tenjur, Astha Sahasrika Prajnaparamita and Satasahasrika Prajnaparmita. The wall around the palace and the city acts as fortress. Near the palace, there are three red monasteries, twelve chortens and a mani wall. There are 60 spouts and 25 doors in the fortress wall.

== Conservation effort ==
The palace was damaged by Gorkha earthquake in 2015. The palace was restored with help from Gerda Henkel Foundation. The restoration was completed in 2073 BS.

== Gallery ==
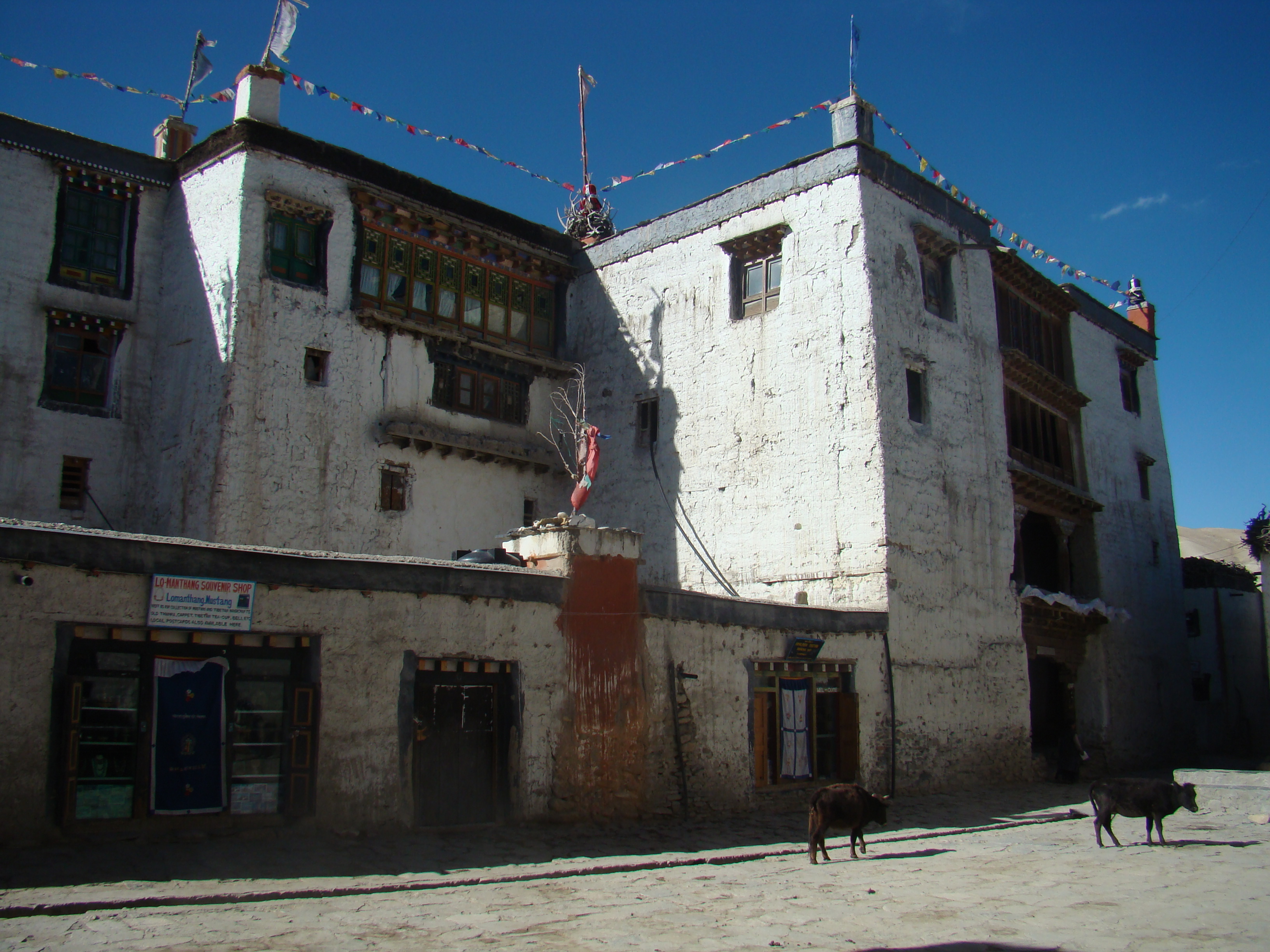

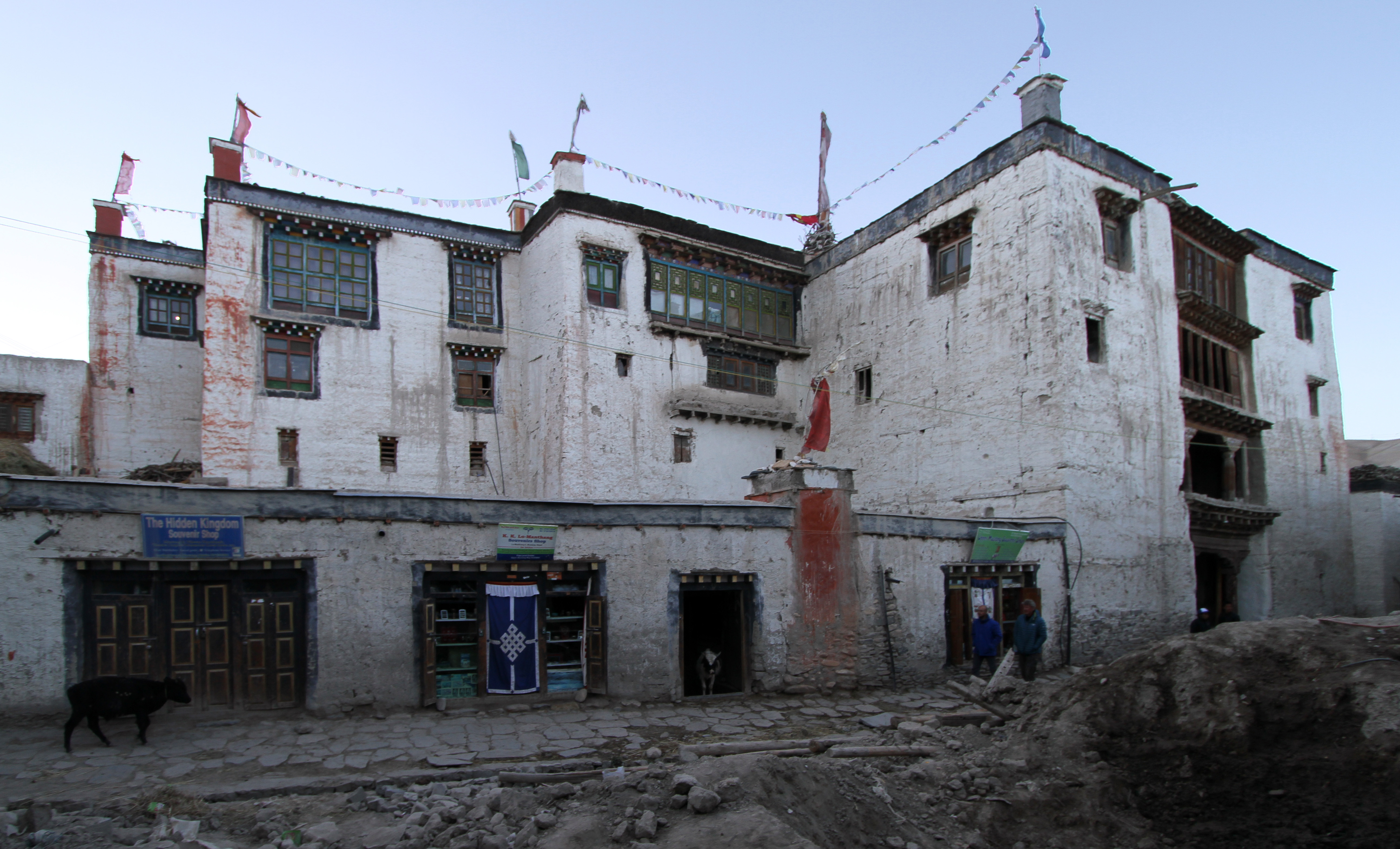

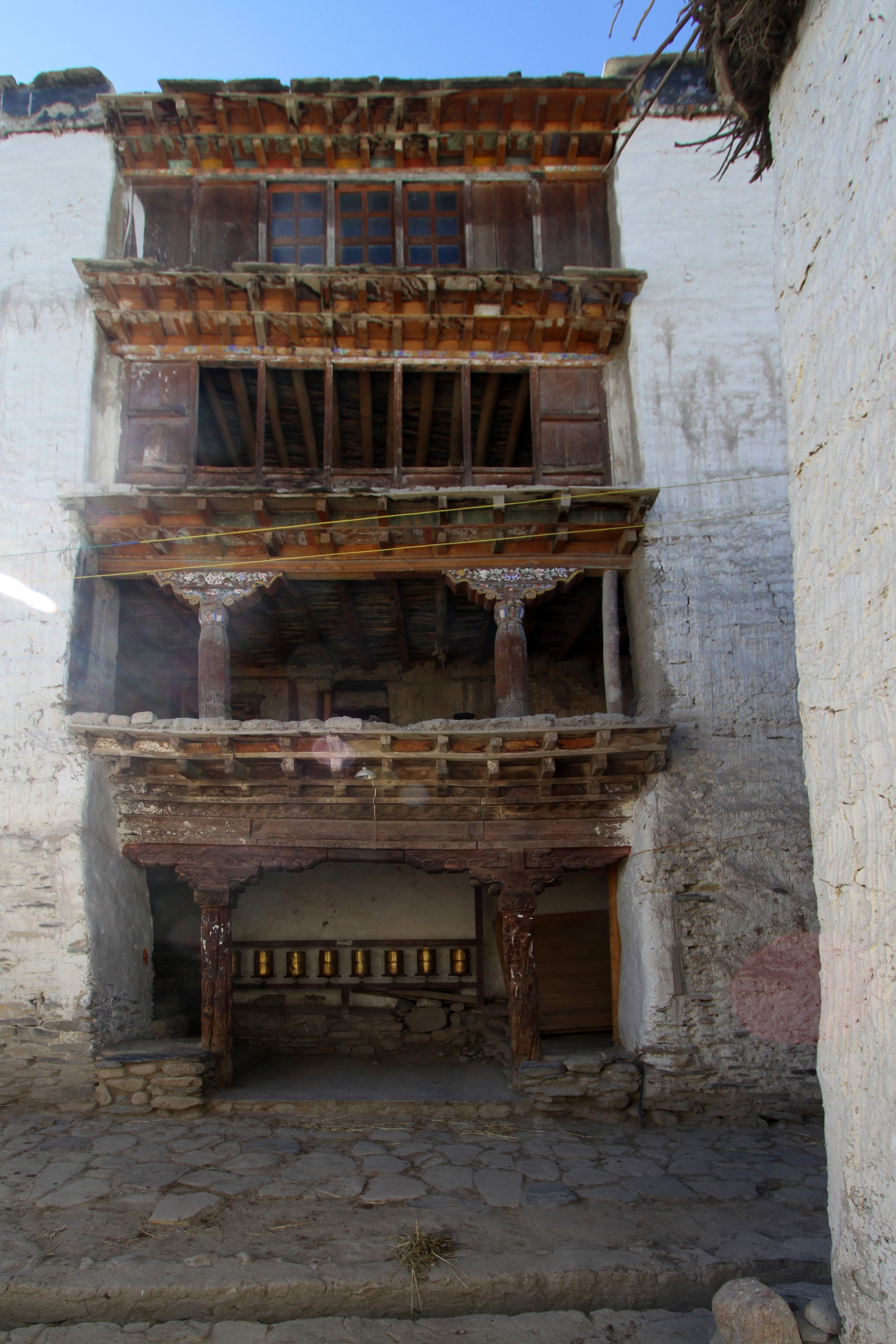

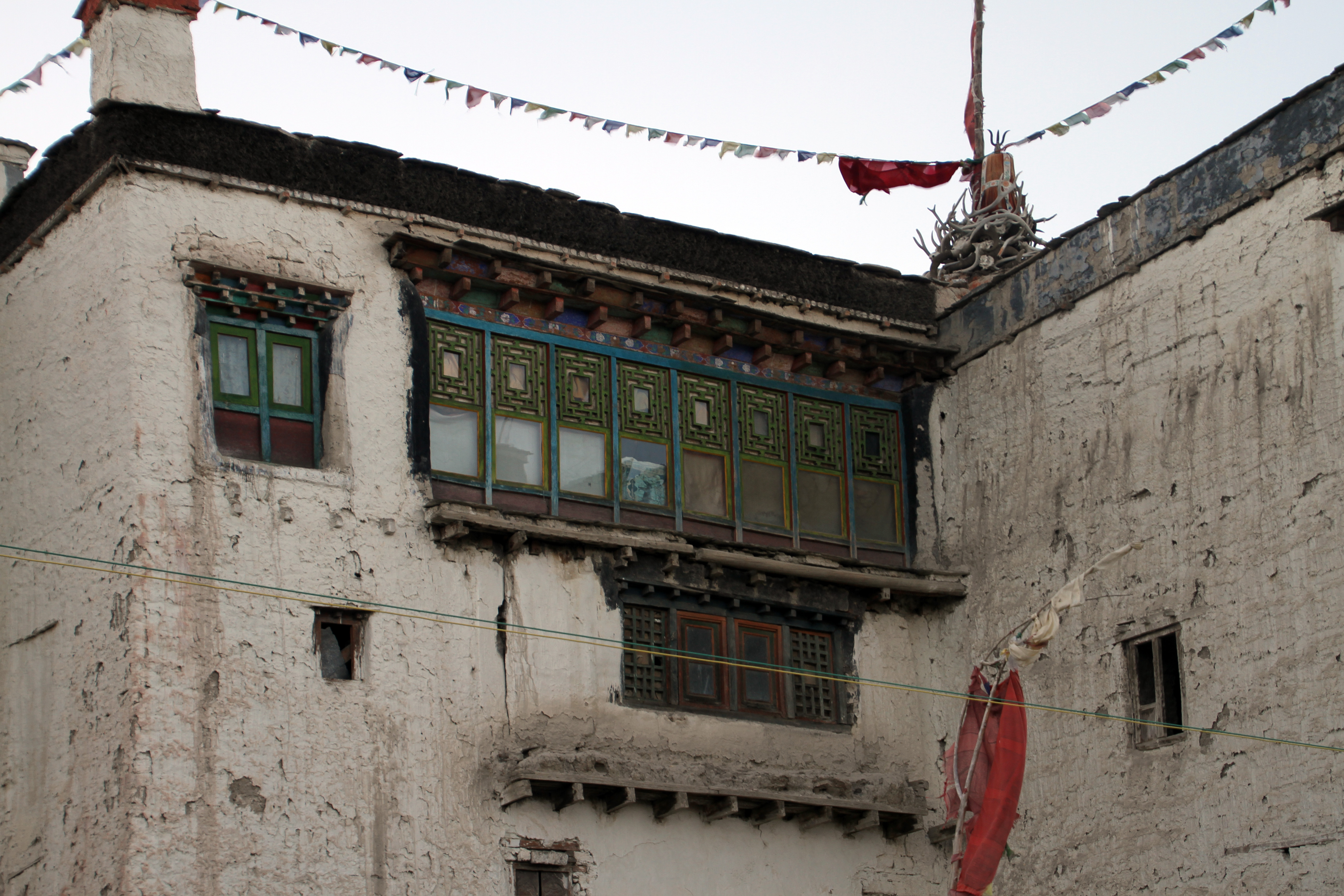

== See also ==
- Palaces in Nepal
