= Mustang Caves =

Upper Mustang
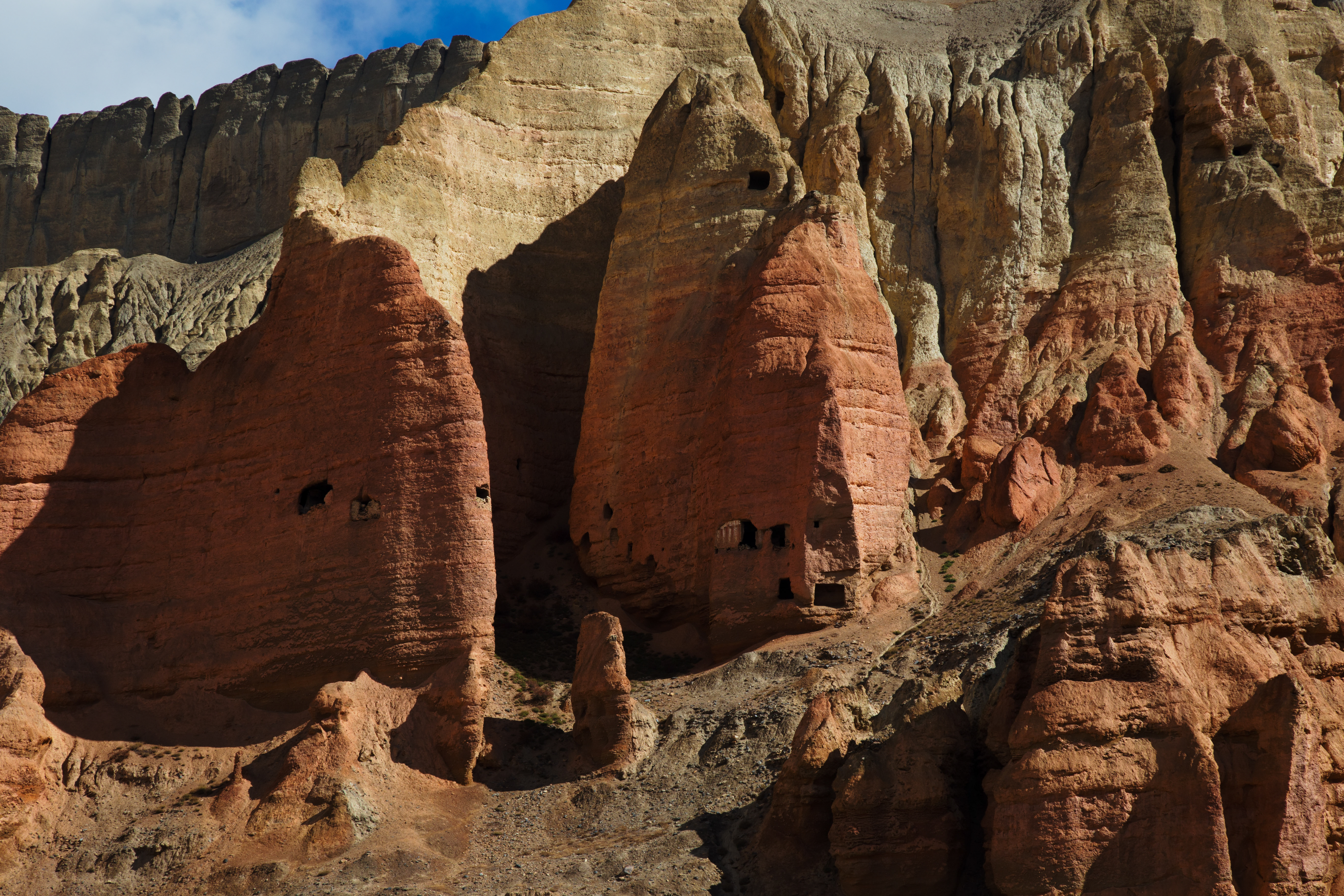
- Caves where Guru Rimpoche eviscerated a demoness, the Balmo

- Upper Mustang, Nepal where the Sky Caves are located
- Coordinates: 28°55′48″N 83°54′36″E

Mustang Caves or Sky Caves of Nepal are a collection of some 10,000 man-made caves dug into the sides of valleys in the Mustang District of Nepal. Several groups of archaeologists and researchers have explored these stacked caves and found partially mummified human bodies and skeletons that are at least 2,000–3,000 years old. Explorations of these caves by conservators and archaeologists have also led to the discovery of valuable Buddhist paintings, sculptures, manuscripts and numerous artifacts belonging to the 12th to 14th century. The caves lie on the steep valley walls near the Kali Gandaki River in Upper Mustang. Research groups have continued to investigate these caves, but no one has yet understood who built the caves and why they were built. The site has been listed as a UNESCO tentative site since 1996.

== History ==
Mustang was formerly the Kingdom of Lo in northern Nepal, with its capital at Lo Manthang. At the end of the 18th century, the kingdom was annexed by Nepal. Upper Mustang was a restricted demilitarized area until 1992, which makes it one of the most preserved regions in the world due to its relative isolation from the outside world, with a majority of the population still speaking traditional Tibetic languages. The monarchy in Mustang ceased to exist on October 7, 2008, by order of the Government of Nepal, after Nepal became a federal democratic republic.

Sky caves

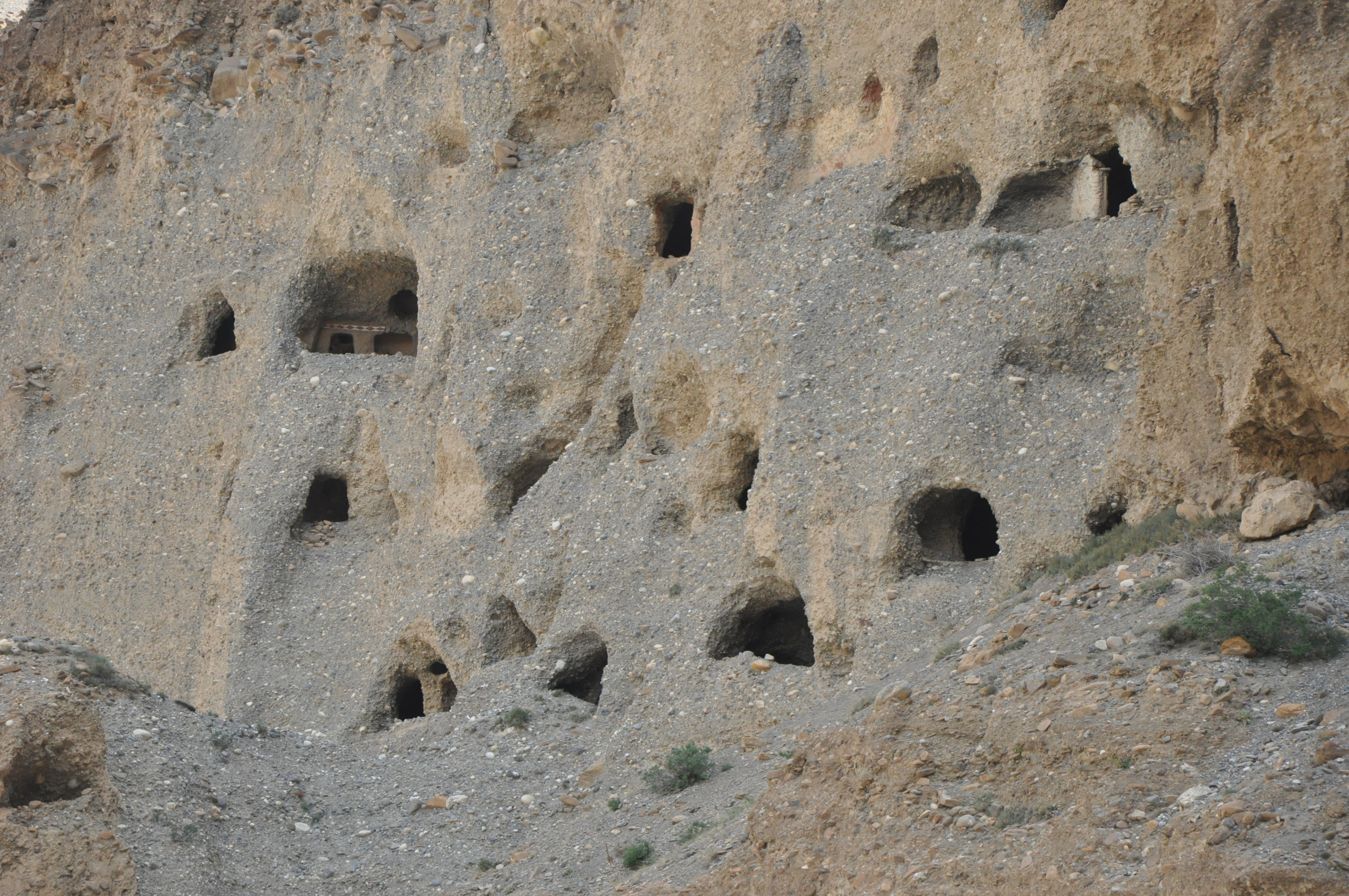
Sky caves in Chhusang

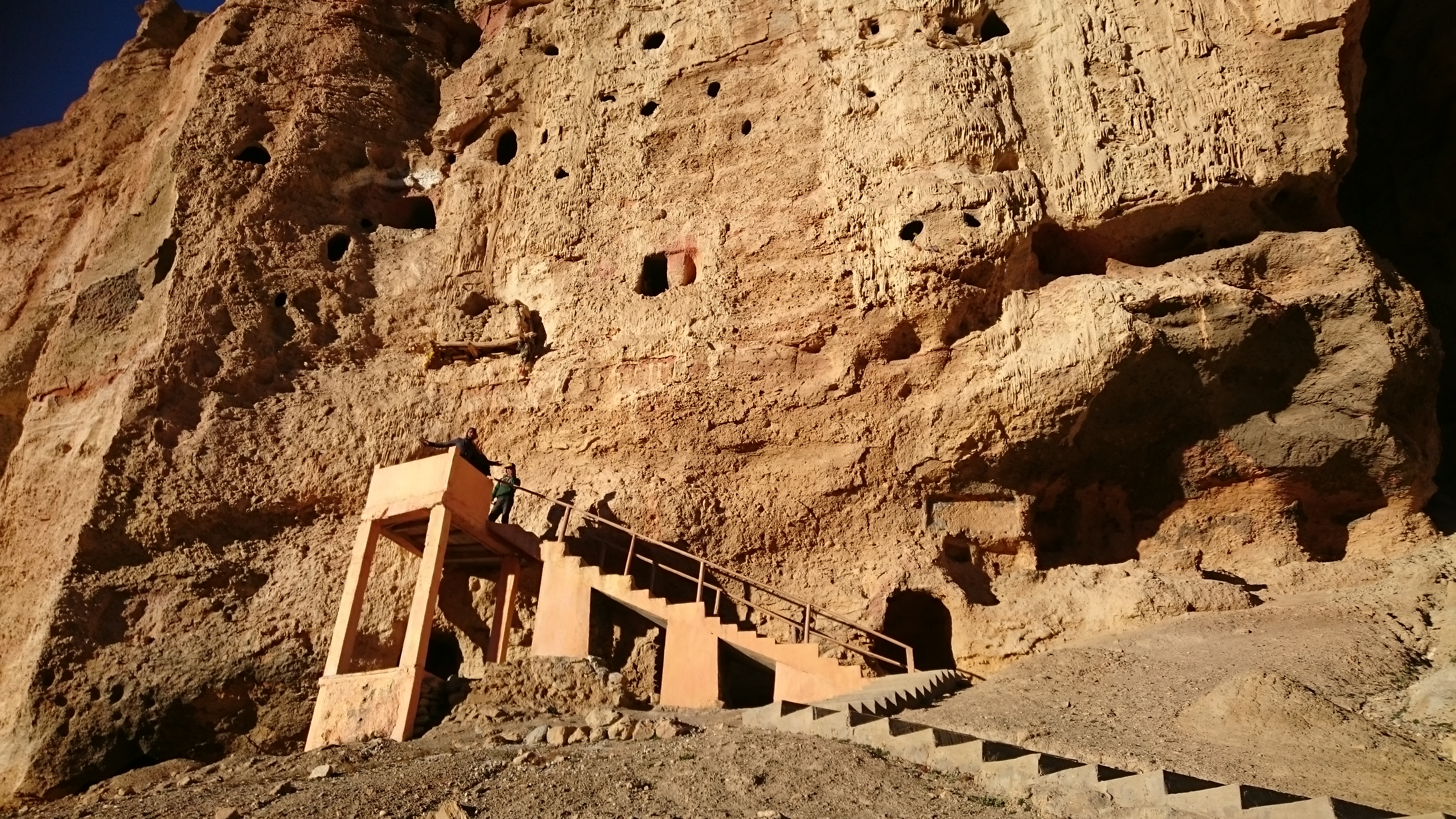
Sky caves at Chhoser village, Lo Manthang

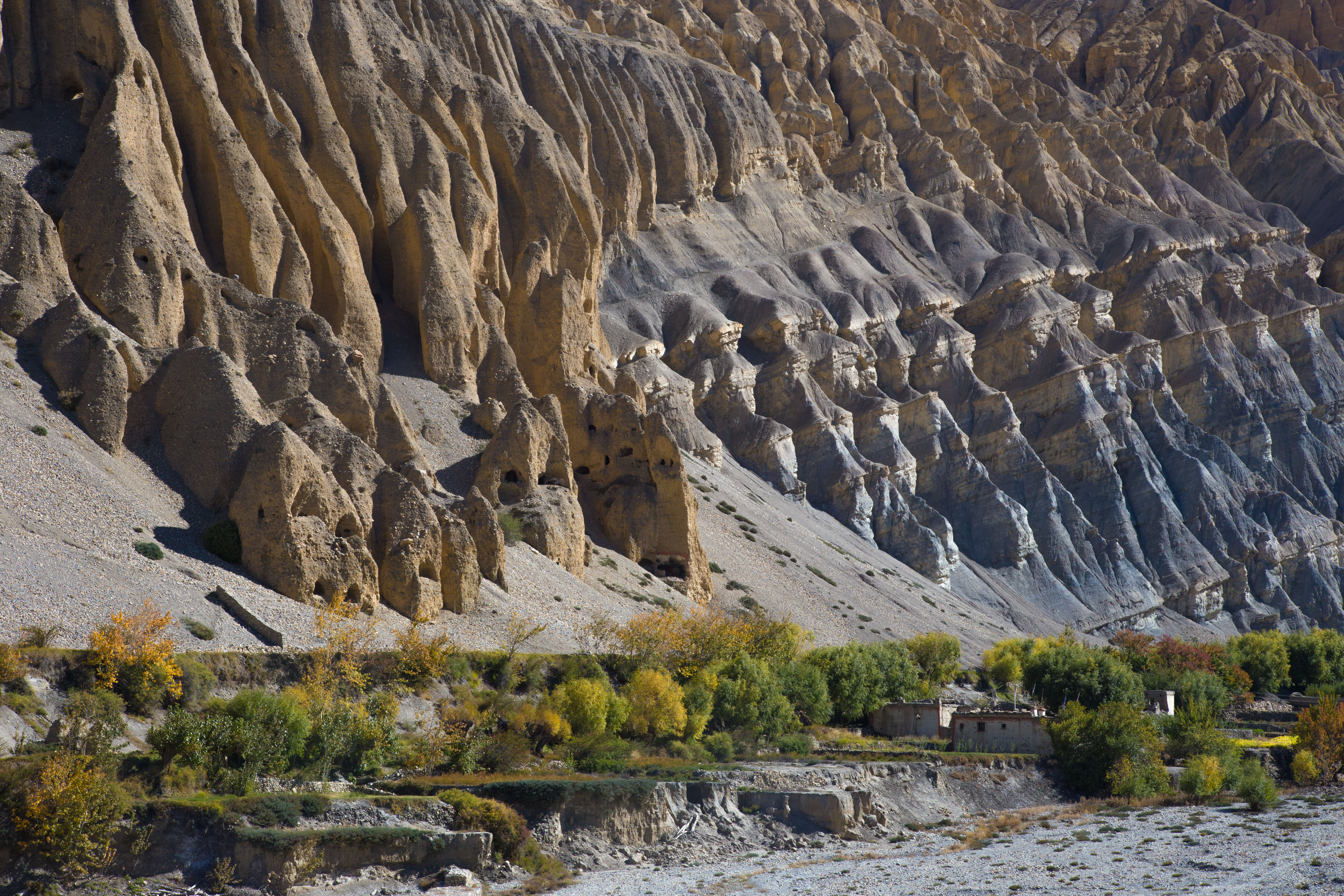
Caves in Tetang

== Mustang human remains ==
In the mid-1990s, archaeologists from Nepal and the University of Cologne began exploring the stacked caves and found several dozen partially mummified human bodies, all at least 2,000 years old.

In 2010, a team of mountaineers and archaeologists uncovered 27 human remains in the two biggest caves near Samdzong. The relatively intact skeletons – dating from the 3rd to the 8th centuries, before Buddhism came to Mustang – had cut marks on the bones. Scientists believe that this burial ritual may have been related to the Bon-Buddhist practice of sky burial. To this day, when a citizen of Mustang dies, the body is sliced into small pieces, bones included, to be swiftly snatched up by vultures. The Mustang Eco Museum, about a 15-minute walk from Mustang's Jomsom airport, displays a collection of beads, bones and pendants found at the caves.

== Religious artifacts ==
In 2007, explorers from the United States, Italy and Nepal discovered ancient Buddhist decorative art and paintings, manuscripts and pottery in the Mustang caves near Lo Manthang, dating back to the 13th century. A second expedition in 2008 discovered several 600-year-old human skeletons and recovered reams of precious manuscripts, some with small paintings known as illuminations, which contain a mix of writings from Buddhism and Bon.

== Usage ==
Scientists divide cave use in Upper Mustang into three periods. As early as 1,000 BC, the caves were used as burial chambers. During the 10th century, the region is thought to have been frequently battled over, and consequently, placing safety over convenience, families moved into the caves, turning them into living quarters. By the 1400s, the caves functioned as meditation chambers.
