= Chhoser =

Chhoser छोसेर
- Village development committee
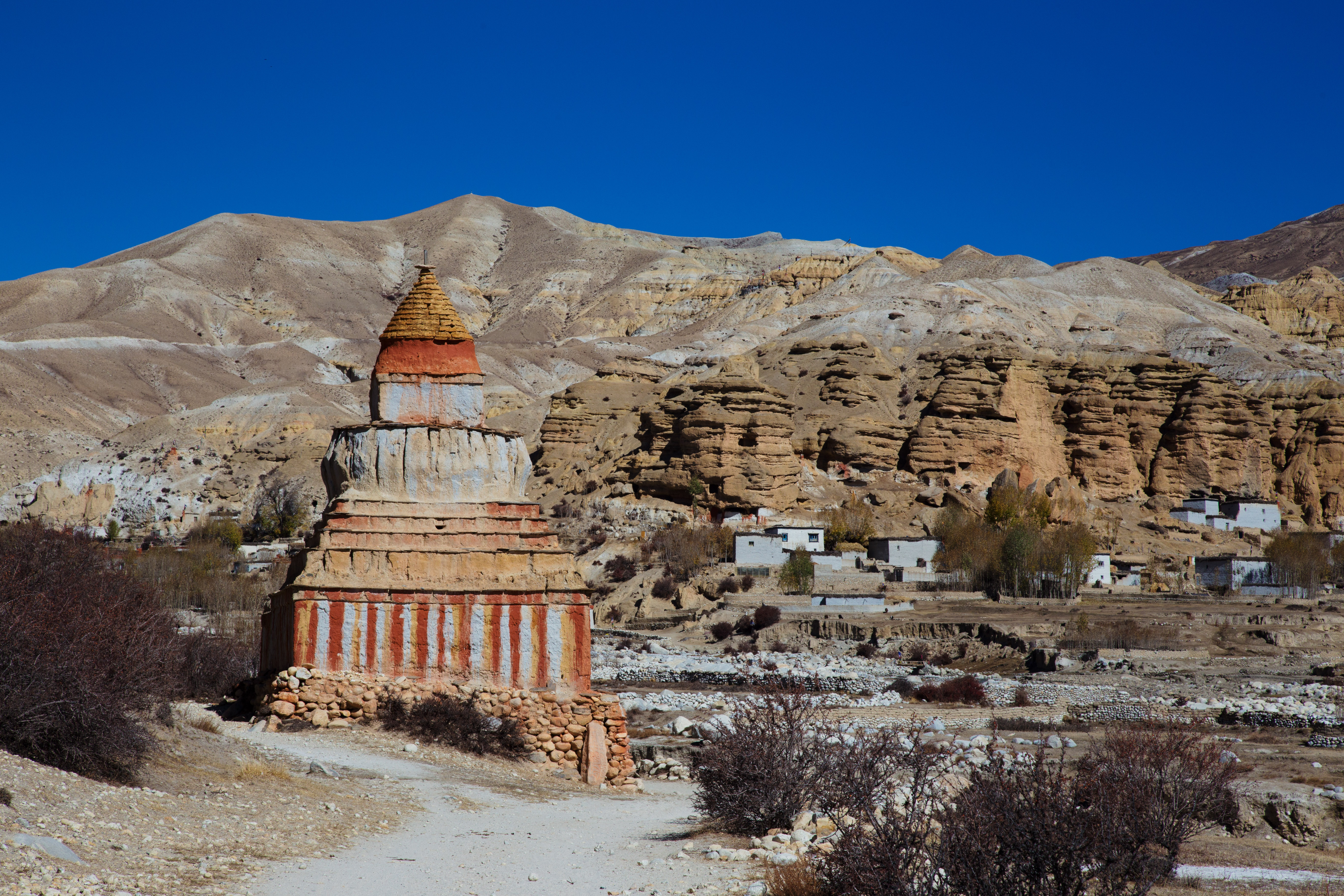
- Chorten at the entrance of the village of Garphu (Chhoser), 27 October 2014

- Location in Nepal Chhoser (Nepal)
- Coordinates: 29.20°N 84.07°E
- Country: Nepal
- Zone: Dhawalagiri Zone
- District: Mustang District

Population (1991)
  - Total: 728
- Time zone: UTC+5:45 (Nepal Time)

Chhoser (also known as Garphu) is a village development committee in Mustang District in the Dhawalagiri Zone of northern Nepal. At the time of the 1991 Nepal census it had a population of 728 people living in 168 individual households.
