= Kali Gandaki Gorge =

Himalayan gorge in Nepal

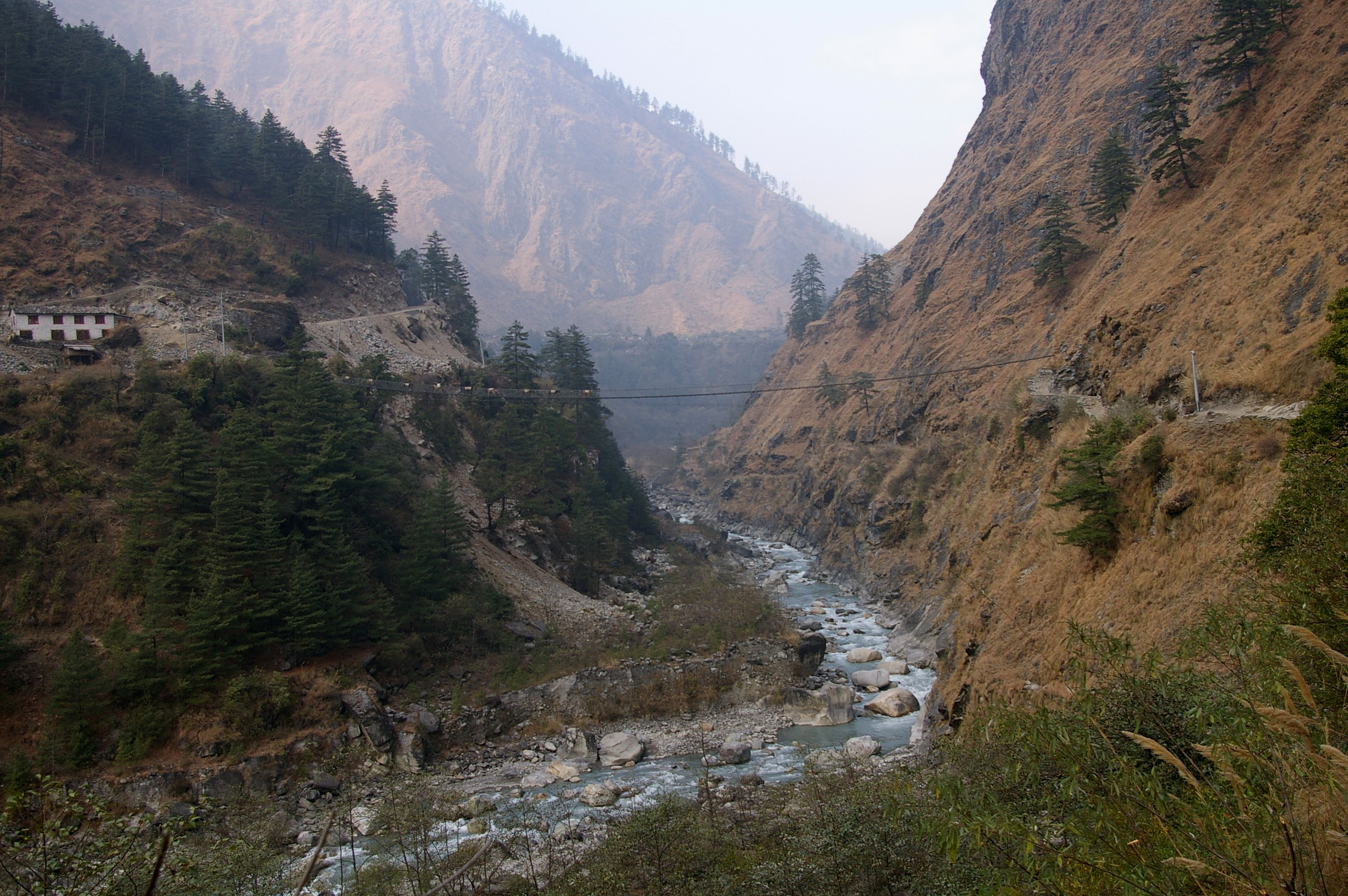
- Kali Gandaki Gorge near Ghassa village, Nepal

- Location within Nepal
- Floor elevation: approx. 2,520 metres (8,270 ft)
- Long-axis direction: N-S

Geography
- Location: Nepal
- Coordinates: 28°42′24″N 83°38′43″E
- Interactive map of Kali Gandaki Gorge

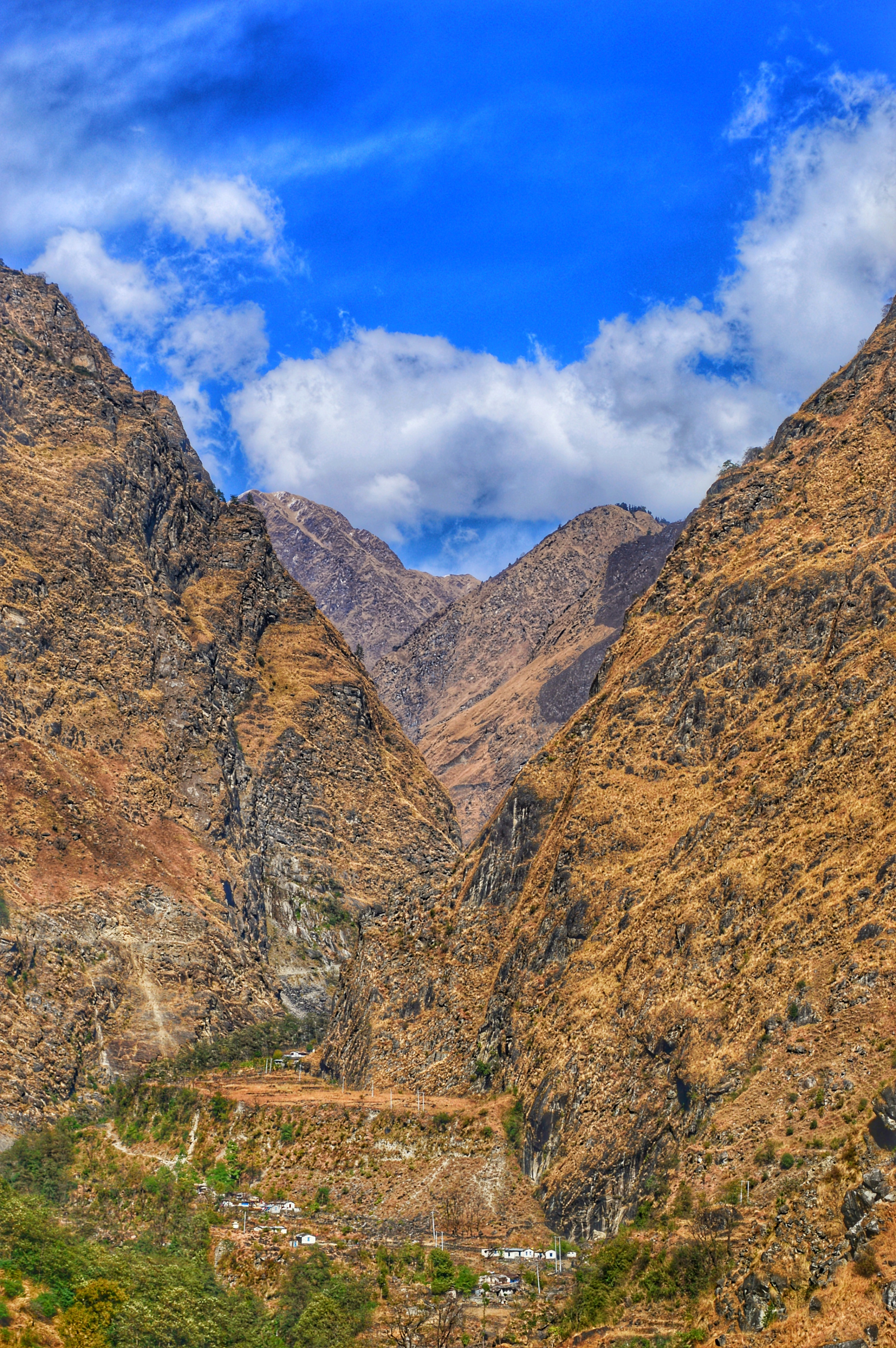
The gorge in 2025

The Kali Gandaki River flowing through the narrow section of the Kali Gandaki Gorge in Nepal.

The Kali Gandaki Gorge or Andha Galchi is the gorge of the Kali Gandaki (or Gandaki River) in the Himalayas in Nepal. By some sources, it may be one of the deepest gorges in the world.

The upper part of the gorge is also called Thak Khola after the local Thakali people who became prosperous from trans-Himalayan trade. Geologically, the gorge is within a structural graben.

== Background ==
The gorge separates the major peaks of Dhaulagiri (8,167 m or 26,795 ft) on the west and Annapurna (8,091 m or 26,545 ft) on the east. The portion of the river directly between Dhaulagiri and Annapurna I (7 km or 4.3 mi downstream from Tukuche) is at an elevation of 2,520 m (8,270 ft), which is 5,571 m (18,278 ft) lower than Annapurna I. As tectonic activity has forced the mountains higher, the river has cut through the uplift. This region is known for shaligram fossils, revered by Hindus as one of five non-living forms of Vishnu.

The Kali Gandaki river source coincides with the Tibetan border and Ganges-Brahmaputra watershed divide. The river then flows south through the ancient kingdom of Mustang. It flows through a sheer-sided, deep canyon immediately south of the Mustang capital of Lo Manthang, then widens as it approaches Kagbeni where high Himalayan ranges begin to close in. The river continues southward past Jomsom, Marpha, and Tukuche to the deepest part of the gorge about 7 km (4.3 mi) south of Tukuche in the area of Lete. The gorge then broadens past Dana and Tatopani toward Beni.

The Kali Gandaki gorge has been used as a trade route between India and Tibet for centuries. Today, it is part of a popular trekking route from Pokhara to Muktinath, part of the Annapurna Circuit. The gorge is within the Annapurna Conservation Area.

The pass at the head of the Kali Gandaki Gorge: Its 19th-century name was Kore La. The modern name is not known with certainty. Below is a quotation from Sven Hedin's visit to the headwaters of the Kali Gandaki in 1904. He points out that the pass is only 96 m (315 ft) above the south bank of the Tsangpo as it flows peacefully a few kilometres to the north in Tibet:

"We stand on the frontier between Tibet and Nepal. Behind us to the north we have flat, level land on the southern bank of the Tsangpo. We have mounted only 315 feet [96 metres] from the river to the Kore-la, where the height is 15,292 feet or 4662 metres asl. And from the pass there is a headlong descent to the Kali Gandak, an affluent of the Ganges. By means of a canal cut through the Kore-la the Brahmaputra might be turned into the Ganges. Northern India needs water for irrigation, but the gain would perhaps be small, for the Brahmaputra in Assam would be as much diminished as the Ganges was increased. Tibet would be opened. A new road would be opened for the invasion of India from the north, and therefore on the whole it is perhaps best for all parties concerned to leave things as they are. But the changes here indicated will some time come to pass without artificial aid, for the tentacles of the Kali Gandak are eating back northwards into the mountains much more quickly than the Tsangpo is eroding its valley. Some time or other, perhaps in a hundred thousand years, the Ganges system will have extended its tentacles to the bank of the Tsangpo, and then will be formed a bifurcation which, in the course of time, will bring about a total revolution in the proportions of the two rivers and their drainage areas."

== See also ==
- Gorkha Bridge
- Yarlung Tsangpo Grand Canyon, the deepest canyon in the world
