= Mustang 1 =

Parliamentary constituency of Mustang District in Nepal

- Parliamentary constituency for the House of Representatives
- Mustang 1in Gandaki Province

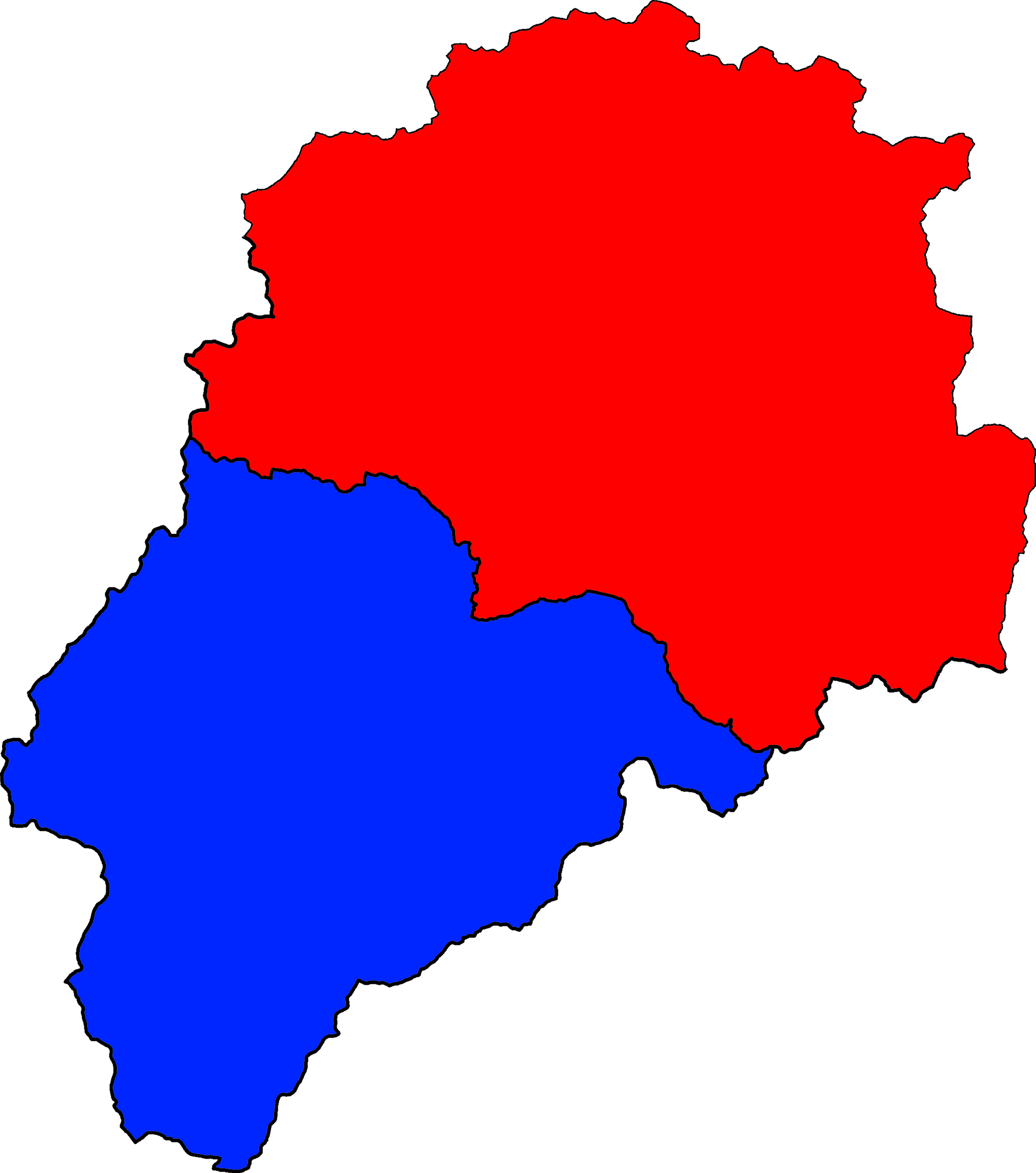
- Assembly segments Mustang 1(A) and Mustang 1(B) within Mustang District
- Province: Gandaki Province
- District: Mustang District
- Electorate: 9,427

Current constituency
- Created: 1991
- MP: Yogesh Gauchan Thakali (NC)
- Gandaki MPA 1(A): Namdu Gurung (NC)
- Gandaki MPA 1(B): Bikal Sherchan (NC)

Mustang 1 is the parliamentary constituency of Mustang District in Nepal. This constituency came into existence on the Constituency Delimitation Commission (CDC) report submitted on 31 August 2017.

== Incorporated areas ==
Mustang 1 incorporates the entirety of Mustang District.

== Assembly segments ==
It encompasses the following Gandaki Provincial Assembly segment

- Mustang 1(A)
- Mustang 1(B)

== Members of Parliament ==
=== Parliament/Constituent Assembly ===
Election	Member	Party
1991	Om Bikas Gauchan	CPN (Unified Marxist–Leninist)
1994	Sushil Man Sherchan	Nepali Congress
1999	Romy Gauchan Thakali	Nepali Congress
2008	Chandra Bahadur Gurung	CPN (Unified Marxist–Leninist)
2013	Romy Gauchan Thakali	Nepali Congress
2017	Prem Prasad Tulachan	CPN (Unified Marxist–Leninist)
May 2018	Prem Prasad Tulachan	Nepal Communist Party
2022	Yogesh Gauchan Thakali	Nepali Congress
2026	Yogesh Gauchan Thakali	Nepali Congress

=== Provincial Assembly ===
==== 1(A) ====
Election	Member	Party
2017	Indra Dhara Dadu Bista	CPN (Unified Marxist–Leninist)
May 2018	Indra Dhara Dadu Bista	Nepal Communist Party

==== 1(B) ====
Election	Member	Party
2017	Mahendra Bahadur Thakali	CPN (Unified Marxist–Leninist)
May 2018	Mahendra Bahadur Thakali	Nepal Communist Party

== Election results ==
=== Election in the 2020s ===
==== 2022 general election ====
Candidate	Party	Votes	%
Yogesh Gauchan Thakali	Nepali Congress	3,992	55.68
Prem Prasad Tulachan	CPN (UML)	3,078	42.93
Others		100	1.39
Total		7,170	100.00
Majority		914	
Nepali Congress gain			

==== 2022 provincial election ====
===== 1(A) =====
Candidate	Party	Votes	%
Namdu Gurung	Nepali Congress	1,048	56.93
Indra Dhara Dadu Bista	CPN (UML)	793	43.07
Others	0	0.00	
Total		1,841	100.00
Majority		255	
Nepali Congress			

===== 1(B) =====
Candidate	Party	Votes	%
Bikal Sherchan	Nepali Congress	2,723	50.94
Chandra Mohan Gauchan	CPN (UML)	2,565	47.98
Others	58	1.08	
Total		5,346	100.00
Majority		158	
Nepali Congress			

=== Election in the 2010s ===
==== 2017 legislative elections ====
Party	Candidate	Votes
CPN (Unified Marxist–Leninist)	Prem Prasad Tulachan	3,544
Nepali Congress	Romy Gauchan Thakali	3,181
Result	CPN (UML) gain	
Source: Election Commission

==== 2017 Nepalese provincial elections ====
===== 1(A) =====
Party	Candidate	Votes
CPN (Unified Marxist–Leninist)	Indra Dhara Dadu Bista	1,167
Nepali Congress	Mikyur Gurung	657
Result	CPN (UML) gain	
Source: Election Commission

===== 1(B) =====
Party	Candidate	Votes
CPN (Unified Marxist–Leninist)	Mahendra Bahadur Thakali	2,584
Nepali Congress	Tshiring Dhawa Gurung	2,259
Rastriya Prajatantra Party (Democratic)	Pravin Kumar Sherchan	32
Rastriya Prajatantra Party	Nar Bahadur Hirachan	12
Result	CPN (UML) gain	
Source: Election Commission

==== 2013 Constituent Assembly election ====
Party	Candidate	Votes
Nepali Congress	Romy Gauchan Thakali	1,424
Independent	Prem Prasad Tulachan	1,402
CPN (Unified Marxist–Leninist)	Chandra Mohan Gauchan	1,099
UCPN (Maoist)	Ngutuk Gurung	1,006
Others		61
Result	Congress gain	
Source: NepalNews

=== Election in the 2000s ===
==== 2008 Constituent Assembly election ====
Party	Candidate	Votes
CPN (Unified Marxist–Leninist)	Chandra Bahadur Gurung	2,456
Nepali Congress	Sushil Man Sherchan	2,392
CPN (Maoist)	Satya Narayan Sherchan	989
Others		155
Result	CPN (UML) gain	
Source: Election Commission

=== Election in the 1990s ===
==== 1999 legislative elections ====
Party	Candidate	Votes
Nepali Congress	Romy Gauchan Thakali	3,891
CPN (Unified Marxist–Leninist)	Krishna Gauchan	2,029
Rastriya Prajatantra Party (Chand)	Nar Bahadur Hirachan	1,351
CPN (Marxist–Leninist)	Birendra Jwarchan	39
Result	Congress hold	
Source: Election Commission

==== 1994 legislative elections ====
Party	Candidate	Votes
Nepali Congress	Sushil Man Sherchan	2,969
Rastriya Prajatantra Party	Nar Bahadur Hirachan	2,749
Result	Congress gain	
Source: Election Commission

==== 1991 legislative elections ====
Party	Candidate	Votes
CPN (Unified Marxist–Leninist)	Om Bikas Gauchan	2,347
Rastriya Prajatantra Party (Chand)		2,209
Result	CPN (UML) gain	

== See also ==
- List of parliamentary constituencies of Nepal
