= Tulachan (surname) =

Tulachan is a Nepali surname. Notable people with the surname include:

- Prem Prasad Tulachan (born 1961) — Nepalese politician
- Shashi Dhoj Tulachan (fl. 1935) — Nepalese spiritual leader
