= Tibet–Nepal salt trade route =

Ancient salt trading route

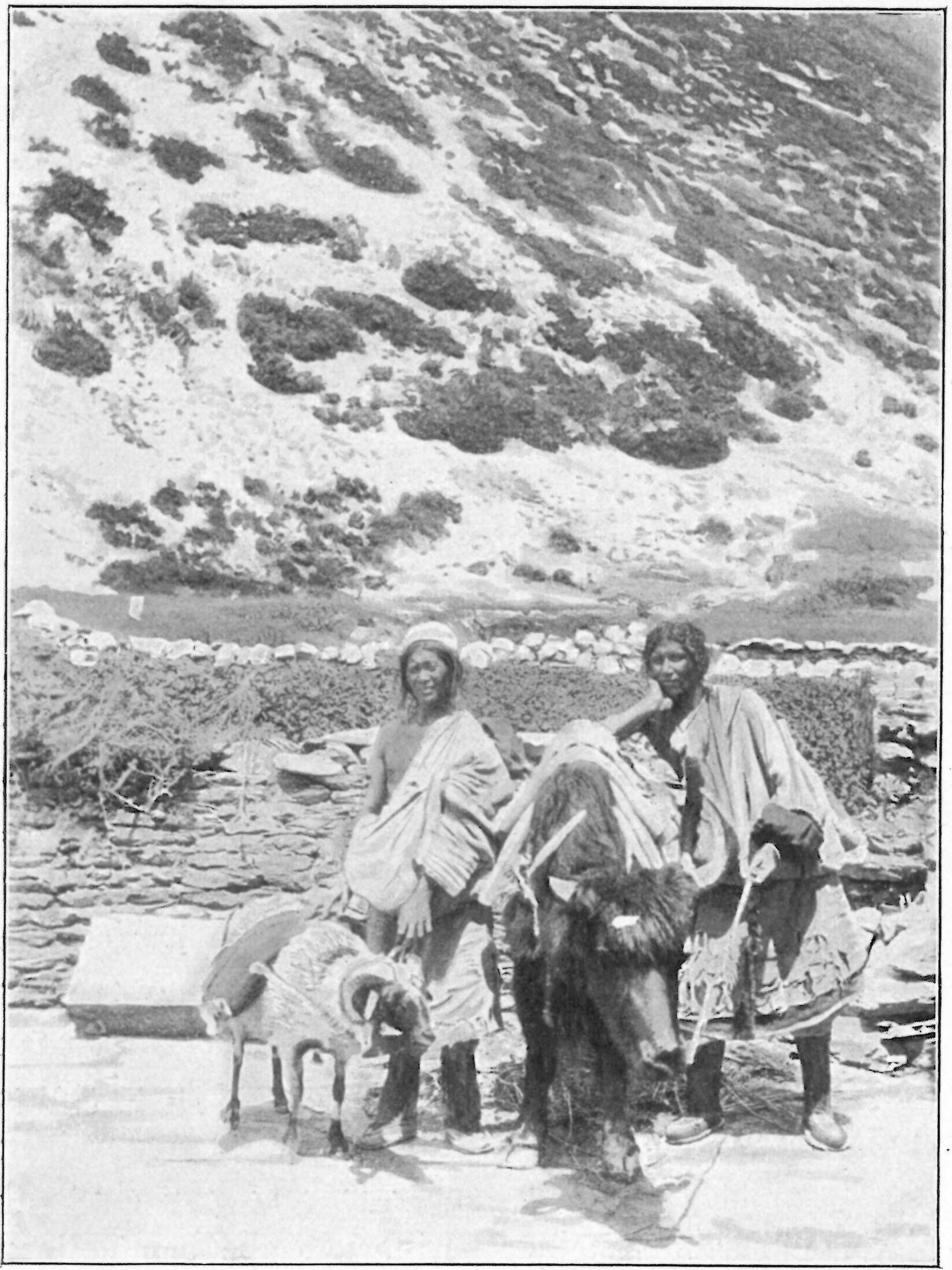
Tibetans with yak and a sheep carrying a bag of salt, near Boudha (1898).

The Tibet–Nepal salt trade route is an ancient salt trading route running between the Tibetan Plateau and the Middle Hills of Nepal and further on to India. After the annexation of Tibet by China in 1950 and the Sino-Indian War in 1962, patterns of trade changed and the use of the old trading route between India and Tibet dwindled and the salt-carrying caravans became redundant.

== Background ==
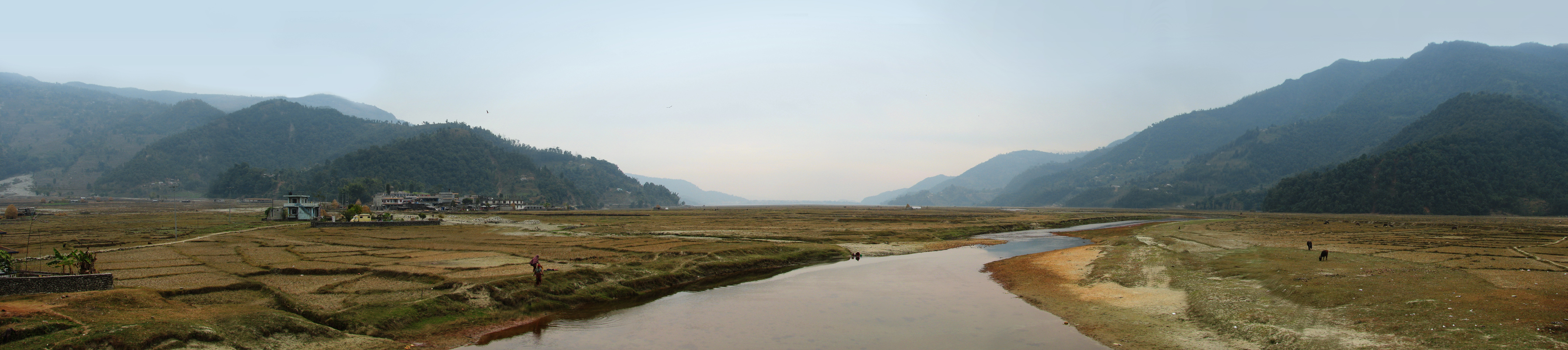
Middle Hills, Nepal.

Throughout history, Nepalis and Tibetans have traded with each other via a number of mountain passes. Two of the most important goods traded were salt from the lakes of Tibet (e.g. Namtso), and rice from the Middle Hills of Nepal. For centuries, the barter of grain and other agricultural products from Nepal with salt and wool from Tibet formed the basis of a trade that has traditionally been in the hands of various, mostly Tibetan-speaking communities. Nomadic groups like the Khyampa, with no land of their own, traded both salt and rice, using sheep, goats and yaks in their travels as a means of survival. Other products from India and China were also bartered.

Tibet had plenty of salt but little rice, while the rice was plentiful in southern Nepal but salt was lacking. Traders could solve this problem; the further they carried their salt from Tibet, the more valuable it became. When sea salt from India became available on the India/Nepal frontier, the price of salt fell. The nomad traders adapted by buying Indian salt and spending the winter in camps in the lowlands of Nepal. Here they made blankets from the wool of their sheep, trading the blankets and the salt with villagers, receiving rice in exchange. In March, they would migrate towards the north, with their sheep and goats carrying the rice, and yaks carrying their domestic belongings. They passed across the mountain passes when the snow had melted sufficiently. Arriving in Purang, Tibet in August, they traded the rice for Tibetan salt, and started on the return journey southwards the following month.

By the 1950s, China's presence in Tibet resulted in the construction of highways on the Tibetan plateau, allowing wheat and rice to be brought in from China for consumption by the Tibetan nomads. At the same time, in Nepal, better roads meant that iodized salt from India was becoming more widely available. This was important because goitre and cretinism were widespread in Nepal. With less demand for the products they carried, the traditional cross-border trade became less economic. In the 1980s, the new Dadeldhura to Doti and the Kohalpur to Banbasa highways were the final blows to the trade.

== Trade routes ==
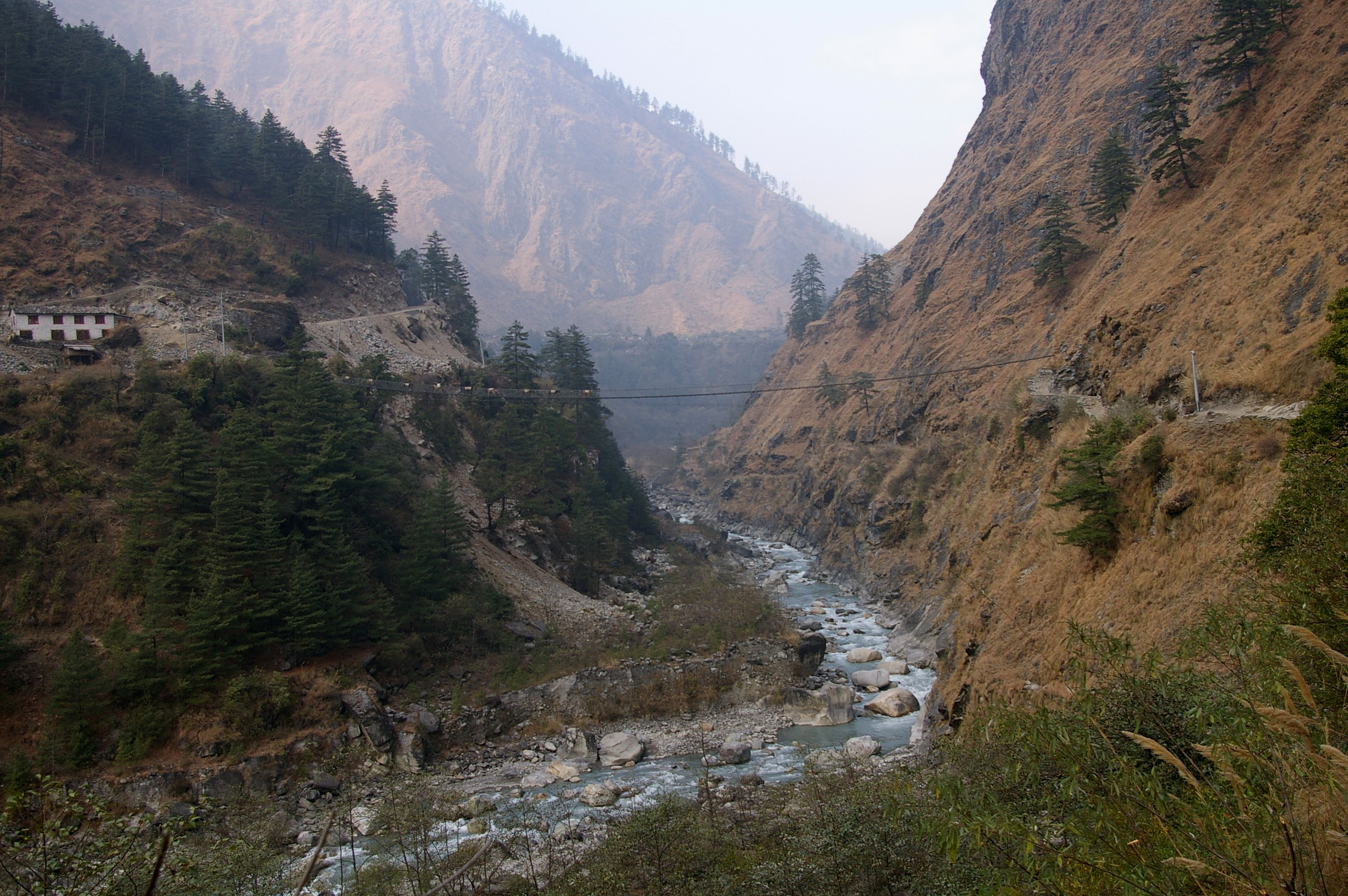
Kali Gandaki Gorge, Nepal.

Some of the easiest paths were in the Mustang District of Gandaki Province. This made the Kali Gandaki Gorge path a focal point for trade. The Upper Mustang comprises the northern two-thirds of the Mustang District in Nepal. Villages like Dana or Tukuche, in the Kali Gandaki Gorge, were stops along the trade route. The Dolpa District also benefited from the trade.

Historically, there are a number of border crossings. The crossing at Kora La between Upper Mustang and Tibet for example was a major salt trade route. However, this crossing was closed due to Tibetan guerrillas in the 1960s. It remains closed for most of the year to this day, except when opening for limited local trade during the semiannual cross-border trade fairs.

For hikers, the Manaslu Circuit follows the salt-trading route along the Budhi Gandaki River and is part of the Great Himalaya Trail.

== See also ==
- Trans-Himalayan Multi-dimensional Connectivity Network
- Himalaya (film)
- The Saltmen of Tibet
- Chhairo gompa

== Bibliography ==
- Graafen, Rainer; Seeber, Christian (June 1992). Important Trade Routes in Nepal and Their Importance to the Settlement Process (PDF). Ancient Nepal. Vol. 130.
