= Sambha gompa =

Monastery in Mustang Region, Nepal

Kamtsang Dargye Choekhorling Monastery (Sambha/Samba/Tsamba gompa)
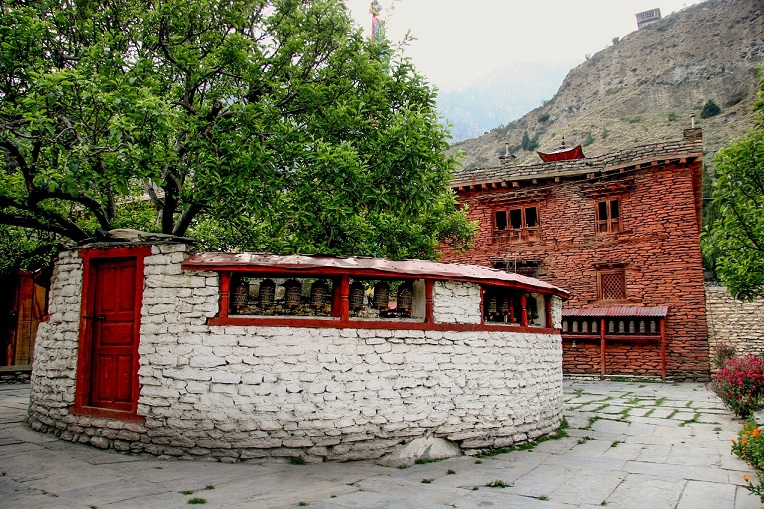
- Sambha gompa courtyard view

Religion
- Affiliation: Tibetan Buddhism
- Sect: Karma Kagyu, Shedrubling

Location
- Location: Nepal
- Country: Nepal
- Interactive map of Kamtsang Dargye Choekhorling Monastery (Sambha/Samba/Tsamba gompa)
- Coordinates: 28°42′39.42″N 83°38′40.54″E

Architecture
- Founder: name not known, from Do Kham, Tibet
- Established: orig est 16th century, re-established 1935

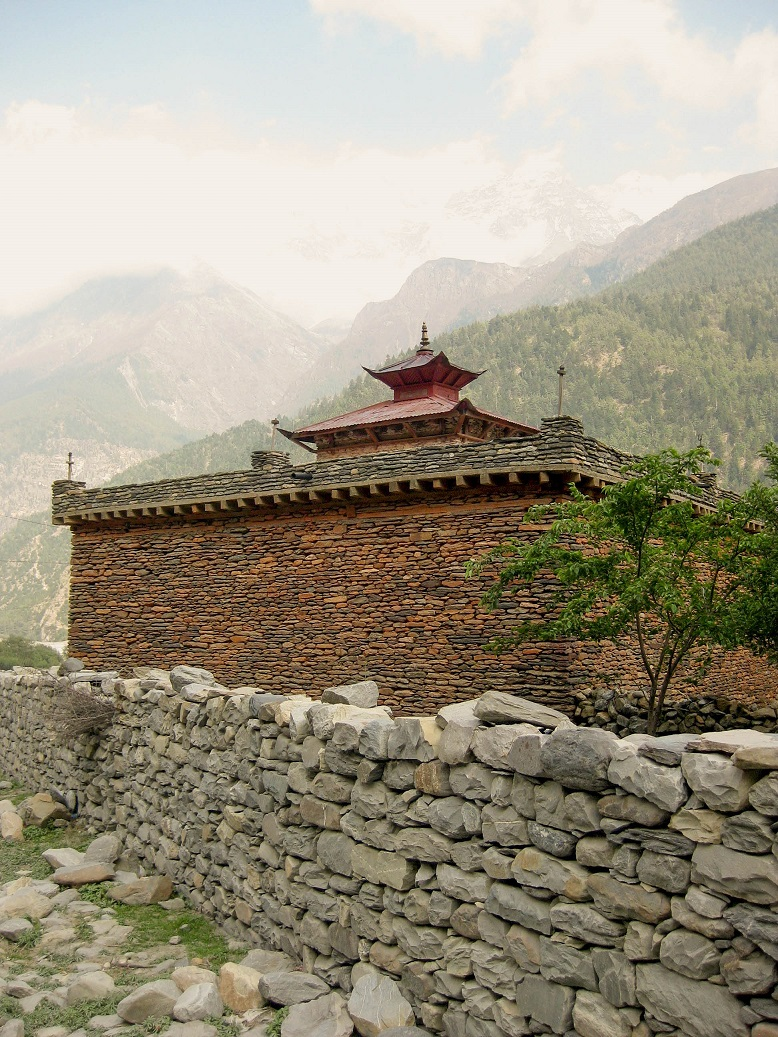
Sambha gompa rear view, Tukuche, Lower Mustang, Nepal

Sambha Gompa is a historic Buddhist monastery located in the Mustang region of Nepal, known for its traditional Tibetan architecture, ancient murals, and longstanding role in the religious life of the local community. As part of the region's network of monastic institutions, it serves as an important center for cultural preservation, ritual practice, and Buddhist learning.

== Location ==
Kamtsang Dargye Choekhorling Monastery, known locally as Sambha (Samba, Sampa) gompa (goenpa), is situated in Mustang district, Tukuche Village development committee (VDC), in the Western Development Region, Nepal. It is about within Tukuche town on the Annapurna trekking route/ gravel road from Pokhara to Jomsom in the Dhaulagiri zone. In 2013 the local higher secondary school, Shree Yogendra HSS was being expanded, and the entrance to the gompa is within the school site; off the main Beni Jomson road, west of the Kali Gandaki river.

== Founding ==
The founder of Sambha gompa is understood to have come from the DoKham area of Tibet, but his name is unknown. He lived in the village of Tukuche for some time and died during a period of mediation. Seven days after his death he became a rainbow body confirming his achievement of enlightenment. In 1935 the gompa was re-established by members of the Tulachan family.

== Incarnations ==
The first and second incarnations (tulku) are understood to have been born into the Kharghar caste and came from Tibet.

3rd incarnation: Bhattachan family

During the tenure of the third incarnation the location of the gompa was moved to its current location. At the time there was no bridge and the river was difficult to cross. Therefore, the villagers offered land to the monks to relocate the gompa within Tukuche village to ease their access.

4th incarnation: Was from the Tulachan family based in Tukuche, whose given name was Karma Tashi Singye, but known locally as Dr Mangal Singh, having gained a medical doctorate in Switzerland. He died aged 49.

5th incarnation: Born 28 years after the death of the previous incarnation, also from the Tulachan family in Tukuche has the monastic name Karma Dhomchhe Norbu Tenpi Gyaltshen Palsamgpo Rinpoche. He is the nephew of current head lama (2016) of Chhairo gompa Shashi Dhoj Tulachan. He was recognised by three senior rinpoches including Tai Situpa Rinpoche. He was enthroned aged 8 in 2004 in India.

He is currently studying at Palpung Monastery in Himachal Pradesh under Kenting Tai Situpa. In order for the young tulku to be accepted by the thakali community, he needs to be enthroned in Sambha gompa, requiring extensive reconstruction of the residential quarters of the monastery.

== Artistic provenance ==
Lama Chh'eon-che, of the Gtsag Bris school of painting, was responsible for paintings on the wall behind the altar c. 1994.

Other frescoes in the gompa depicting the sixteen Arhat on the south, north and eastern walls are by Khaipa Chhogyal, a distant relative of Kamal Dhoj Tulachan, Shashi Dhoj Tulachan's late father.

Khaipa of Lupra is believed to have painted the Sin-yeb, but this painting no longer remains.

Damaged roof timbers mean that water ingress has damaged many paintings in recent years. Although roof repairs commenced in 2015, this has yet to be completed due to lack of funds.

== Monastic activity ==
In 2013 there was very limited monastic activity. Tukuche has lost much of its population due to changes in trade routes and rural urban migration suffered by many small villages. This first occurred in the 1960s when China tried to restrict movement of Tibetans and most recently during the 2008 Olympics. Lama Shashi Dhoj Tulachan an artist from Tukuche village, is responsible for the continued management of the gompa and is seeking support for its physical and spiritual renovation, in addition to the restoration work at Chhairo gompa which he is also responsible for. A nun (anim) who also takes care of Rani gompa, looks after the site.

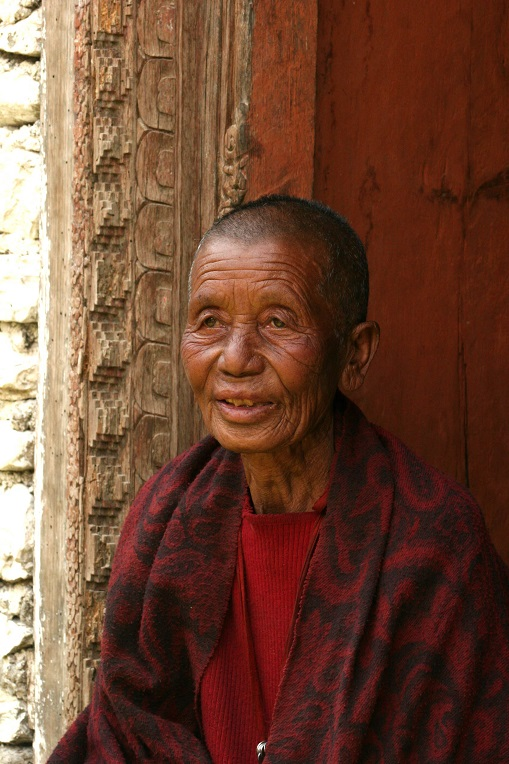
caretaker nun of Sambha gompa (c) 2013

There is a part time monk sponsored by the current Ven Gyalpo Rinpoche who undertakes monastic rituals as required.

== Tulku quarters ==
To the south of the monastery are the historical residential quarters for the monk body. These facilities are not currently habitable and the courtyard is used for general storage from the gompa next door.

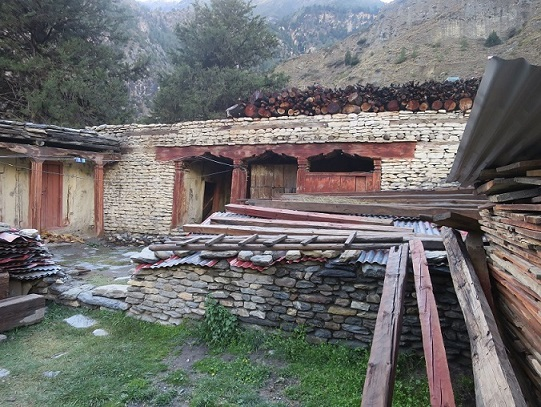
Sambha gompa_current state of tulku accom

== Architecture and restoration plans ==
The gompa was restored in the 2000s.

A stupa was constructed in the courtyard in memory of a Japanese man, married to a local Nepali, who was a donor for the reconstruction works.

Water ingress and damaged roof timbers required roof repairs to be started in 2015, however this has stalled due to lack of funds.

Reconstruction of the tulku and lama quarters is planned to enable enthronement of the current tulku, who is studying in India. Funding limitations have delayed this work and the frescoes continue to be affected by rain water.

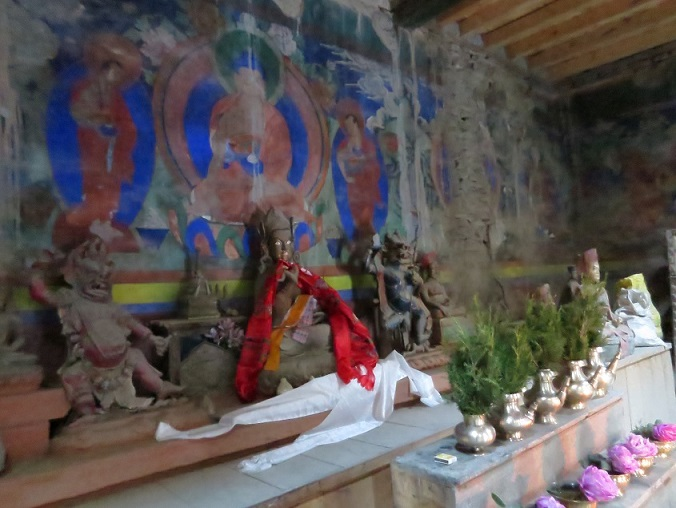
Sambha Gompa_internal view of shrine showing new rooftimbers

Shrine imagery was removed whilst the roof was replaced. A number of items remain with individual villagers until the work is completed.
