= Marpha brandy =

Nepalese fruit brandy

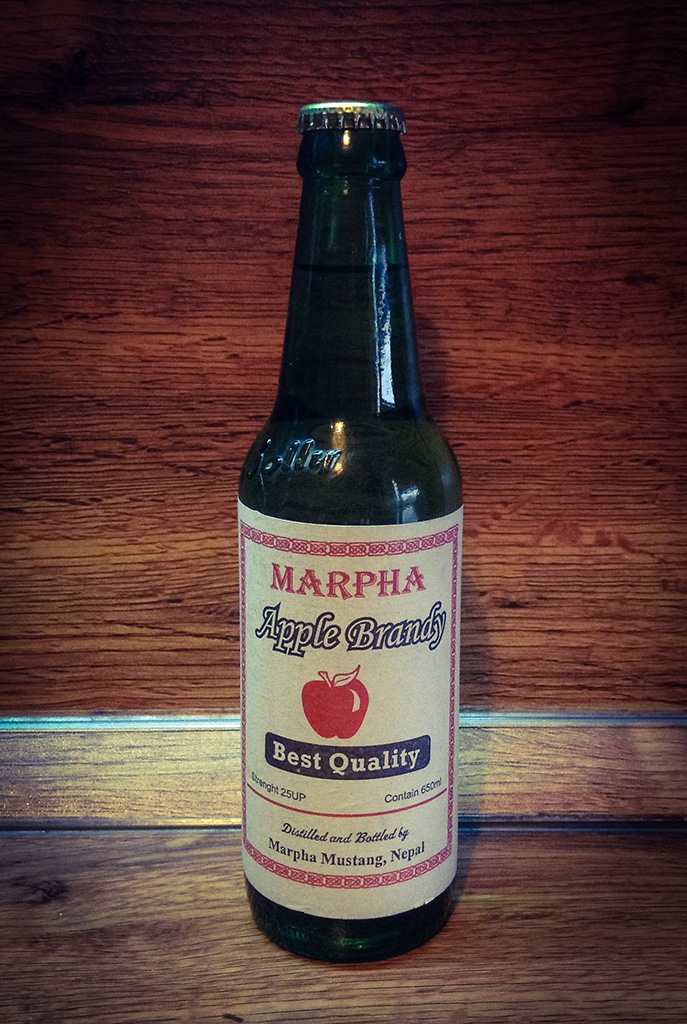
- Bottled Marpha brandy
- Type: Brandy
- Origin: Mustang, Nepal
- Alcohol by volume: 42%
- Ingredients: Fruits (apple, apricot, pear)

Marpha brandy (Nepali: मार्फा ब्राण्डी) is a type of fruit brandy produced in the Marpha village of Mustang district in Nepal. It is manufactured from a variety of local fruits such as pear, apricot, apple, etc. and is mostly made by the Thakali people—an ethnic group indigenous to Mustang region. Its strength is around 42% ABV (Alcohol by volume). It is commonly produced in apple and apricot varieties and has been described as being around 42 percent alcohol by volume (ABV).

== Manufacturing process ==
Marpha village of Mustang region of Nepal is suitable for growing various types of fruits. Fruits such as pear, apricot and apple are produced in large quantity in the region. The fruits produced are used to make various items such as preserves, wine, brandy and dried fruit.

The plucked fruits are washed and kept in a barrel for a week. After a week, the pulp is separated from the skin and the pulp is used to produce wine whereas the skin are separated in another barrel. The skin of the fruits are then stored in the airtight barrel for about another two weeks. Yeast (marcha) and other chemicals required for fermentation are added during this period. After the fermentation process is complete, the mixture is boiled and the steam is collected as the final product.

== Sales ==
Most of the brandy distilleries of the region are owned and operated by the local Thakali people. As of 2019, there were six commercial distilleries in the Marpha village. Mustang is a remote district in the western part of Nepal near the Tibetan plateau. The major source of income of the region are tourism and agriculture. Marpha brandy is said to be distributed by at least one producer mainly within Mustand, with demand also reported in Kathmandu. The various product produced from the fruits are exported to various region of the country as well as the world. Marpha brandy has also become a popular souvenir item that tourist buy for their friends and families back home.
