= Dhoj =

Dhoj is a name. Notable people with the name include:

- Mahendra Dhoj G.C., Nepalese politician
- Prem Dhoj Pradhan (1938–2021), Nepalese musician
- Shashi Dhoj Tulachan, Nepalese spiritual leader
- Damber Dhoj Tumbahamphe, Nepalese politician
