= Chhairo gompa =

Tibetan Buddhist monastery in Mustang, Nepal

Tashi Shagagh Jyochen Chhoyokhor Ling (Chhairo, Tsérok Monastery)
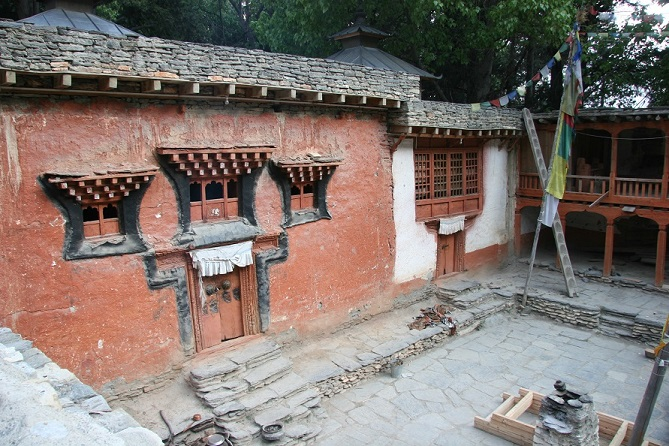
- Chhairo gompa courtyard, Lhakang and Padmasambhava shrine room, Chhairo, Lower Mustang, Nepal

Religion
- Affiliation: Tibetan Buddhism
- Sect: Nyingma
- Deity: Padmasambhava
- Leadership: Shashi Dhoj Tulachan

Location
- Location: Chhairo, Mustang, Gandaki
- Country: Nepal
- Interactive map of Tashi Shagagh Jyochen Chhoyokhor Ling (Chhairo, Tsérok Monastery)
- Coordinates: 28°44′17.7″N 83°40′58.1″E

Architecture
- Founder: Chhawang Thinlen
- Established: 16th century

Chhairo Monastery (Wylie: tshe rogs dgon pa, THL Tsérok Monastery) was the first monastery of the Nyingma school of Tibetan Buddhism founded in Upper Mustang. It was established in the 16th century and is part of present-day Mustang District, Nepal.

The village and the gompa are located on the historic salt trade route and the population of both Chhairo Monastery and Chhairo village, which fell into decline when China closed its border with Nepal in the 1960s to restrict movement by pro-Tibetan activists and again recently due to security concerns during the 2008 Summer Olympics.

The last remaining monks left the monastery in the 1970s, and by 1981 only four nuns were taking care of the monastery. From 1981 to the 1990s, the management of Chhairo Gompa was left wholly to Chhairo village.

Since the mid-2000s, efforts to reconstruct the main gompa complex have been made. This work is restricted to the monastery, shrine room to Padmasambhava and the main rooms that form a quad around these. The larger monastery complex of rooms for monks, visitors, pilgrims and their horses remain in ruins to the east.

== Name and location ==
Tashi Shagagh Jyochen Chhoyokhor Monastery, known locally as Chhairo Monastery, Chandanbari Monastery and historically as Tsérok Monastery, is situated in Mustang District, Marpha Village development committee (VDC), Ward No. 9, Chhairo village, in the Western Development Region, Nepal at 2,680 metres (8,790 ft). It is about 20 mins walk south from Marpha town on the Annapurna trekking route from Pokhara to Jomsom in the Dhaulagiri zone, on the left bank of the Kali Gandaki river reached by a small footbridge from the main road south of Marpha, and is about a 1.5 hours walk north of Tukuche village, signposted to Chimang.

== Influence of trade on the Thakali region ==
This is the area of the Thakali, an ethnolinguistic group originated from the Thak Khola region. Chhairo Gompa is located on the historical salt trading route from Tibet to southern Nepal.

Customs offices were established in Nhechung near Rhyamdo, and thereafter in Jomsom, Mustang, Chhairo and Tukuche to serve the salt trade. The trade routes contributed to the rich political, social, religious and cultural activities of the late 1800s. The salt, grain and livestock trade enriched the economic and living standards of the local Thak communities, providing a conducive environment to establish the gompa which then served residents and traders alike.

== Founding ==
The name of Chhairo village and the monastery is believed to originate from the name of a waterfall in the area, which is called chhahara in the Nepali language. The founder, Chhawang Thinlen (called sku shogs "The Illustrious"), is believed to have been a Thak resident having come from Kyirong Monastery. Alternative stories state that he was the younger of two brothers who migrated to Chhairo from Dhakartas Pandrasaya Khola of Rasuwa district.

The Padmasambhava chapel, called Sanga Choling, is the smaller chapel to the northeast of the main shrine room. It is believed to have been built in the 18th century by Lama Sangye.

== Spiritual provenance ==
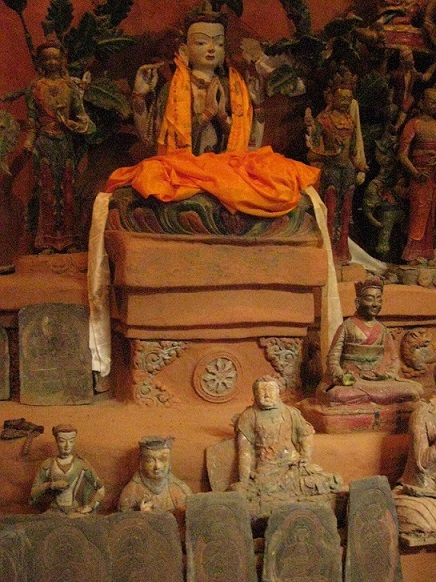
Gautama Buddha shrine at Chhairo Monastery

The Monastery has its spiritual roots in the Northern Treasure (Wylie: byang gter) lineage, which was first taught at the three Nyingma Mother Monasteries of Dorje Drak, Katok Monastery and Palyul in Tibet. Chhairo monastery contributed to the expansion of the Nyingma teachings in Nepal and the Thak region in particular and was the first Nyingma monastery in Nepal.

During the tenure of the second incarnation of Chhawang Thinlen, the monastery flourished and the extent of the physical infrastructure can still be seen outside the grounds of the current gompa. The footprint of the accommodation is visible for the lamas, monks and nuns who studied at the monastery contributing to the growth of the Nyingma school and the establishment of other monasteries in the region.

== Incarnations (Tulkus) ==
The first incarnation was in the Sherchan family, but no further details are known.

The second Lama reincarnation of Chhairo was the elder brother of Shanta Kumar Guachan. The Gauchan family and local people recall that five or six days after he was born, sun rays that touched him turned to a rainbow, identifying him as a reincarnation.

Three years after the death, aged forty, of the second incarnation, Rajendra Bhattachan was born in Tukuche, the third reincarnation.

The current incarnation has chosen not to become a Lama. He has therefore delegated the authority of Chhairo Gompa to Shashi Dhoj Tulachan.

== Reviving the Gompa in body and soul ==
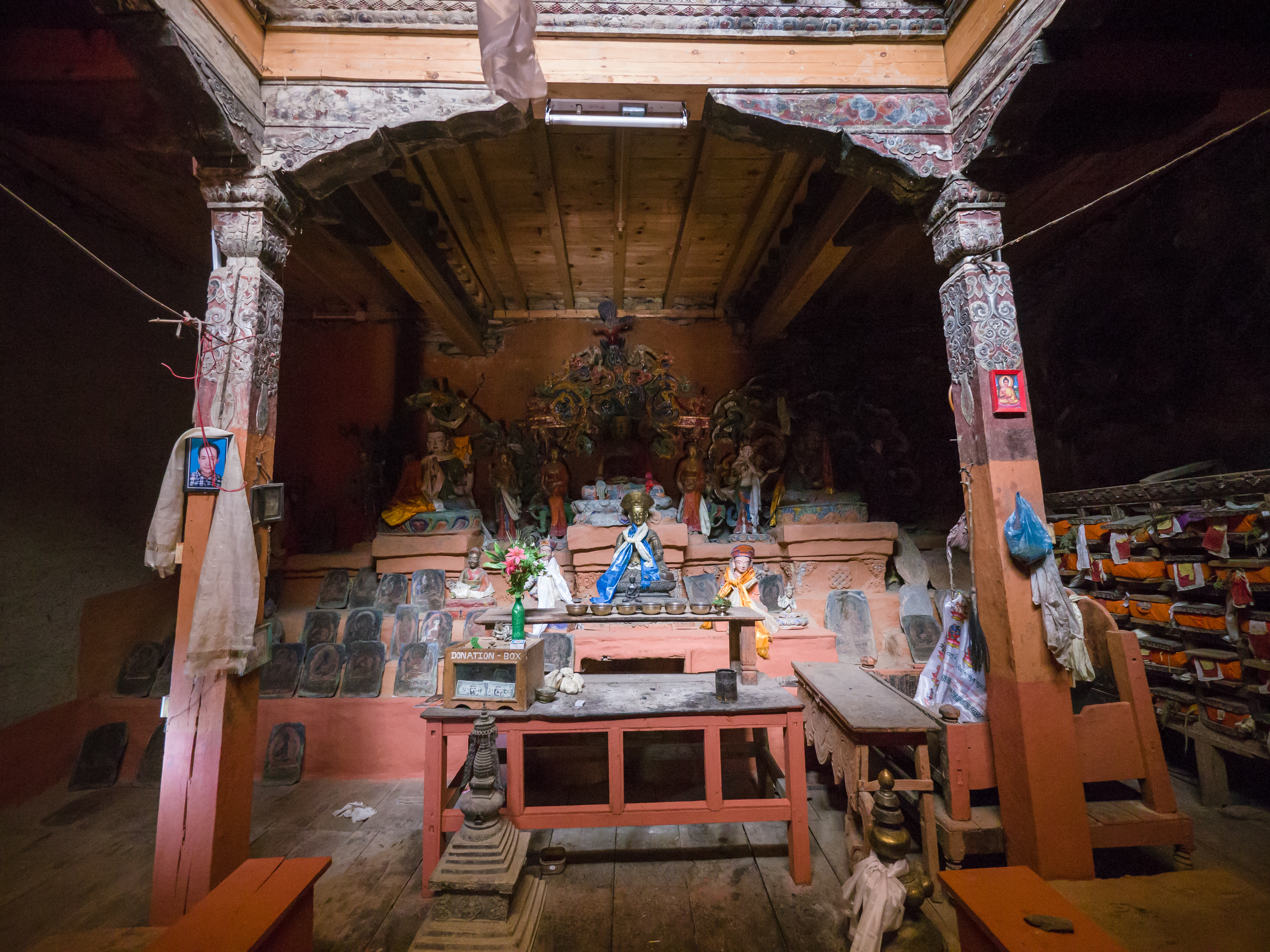
Inside Chhairo Gompa

Body

Responding to the first Tibetan rebellions against Chinese occupation, the Chinese government closed the Nepal–Tibet border at the Mustang passes. Changes in demand for goods and opening of alternative routes and modes of transport further affected the historic trade routes and Chhairo Gompa became less and less influential. Over time, community use of the gompa also declined as the local population moved away in search of alternative work and livelihood. As with many religious structures in the region, no monks remained at Chhairo, and it was given into the hands of local caretakers who were only able to maintain the core shrine rooms and courtyard.

Recognising the wider importance of Chhairo Gompa in establishing the Nyngma sect in Thak, on the occasion of the 12 yearly Lhaphew, held in 2049 BS (Vikram Samvat) (approx. 1992 CE) a delegation from Chhairo visited Subba Tek Narsingh Bhattachan, a wealthy family and long time patrons, in Tukuche to request assistance in restoring the gompa.

Inspired by their forefathers accounts of Tukche and Chhairo in their former glory and strong architectural and religious heritage, and stimulated and encouraged by Sashi Dhoj Tulachan, their religious leader, some of the younger generation is interested to repair and conserve the gompa complex, revitalising the community and rehabilitating the disintegrating fabric of Tukche through various activities associated with Chhairo Gompa.

The Chhairo Reconstruction and Maintenance Committee was formed who proceeded to collect information about the legal status of the gompa structures and property as well as determine the extent of the works that would be required.

In 2045 BS (approx. 1997/98) funds had been raised and technical conservation advice was sought, enabling engagement of an architectural firm to undertake a preliminary survey and develop the reconstruction scope and estimate.

Since 2004/5, the reconstruction has been supported by RWI, previously known as CRTP.

Soul

In 2012 the gompas became home to six young boys aged 7 to 11 from Jumla and Dolpa districts of the Mid-Western Development Region, Nepal who will train to be monks. From summer 2012 to autumn 2013 attended mainstream education at the primary school of the adjacent Tibetan camp, learning Nepali, Tibetan and English.

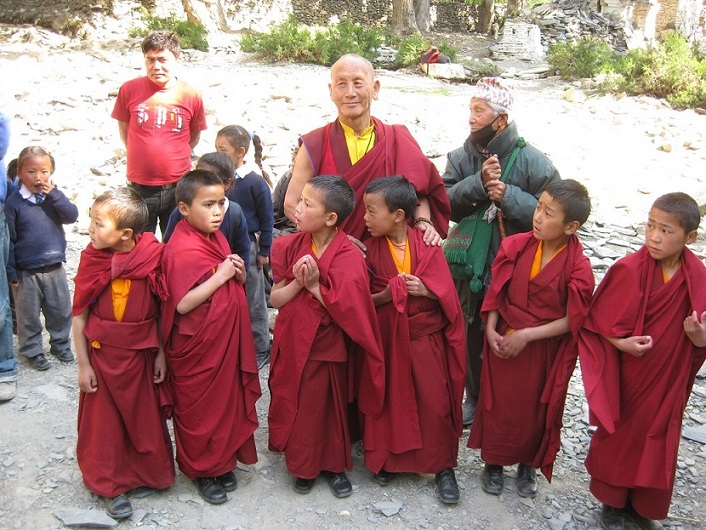
Chhairo Gompa: Lama Shashi + young monks

The local community continue to be involved in decisions regarding the direction and extent of the reconstruction efforts. The current Lama, Shashi Dhoj Tulachan leads the interaction with the architect and volunteer groups, together with his brother, Chakra Tulachan. Chhairo villagers are employed as masons, carpenters and labourers as well as caretakers for the lhakang and gyalpo and cook and caretaker for the 6 young monks in training.

In the winter school break of 2013-2014 they began more regular monastic studies under the guidance of Lopen Sonam, during the winter to Pokhara to work towards a new generation of monks to serve Chhairo Gompa.

== Guru Nawang Chhogyall Tenzin (Shashi Dhoj Tulachan) ==
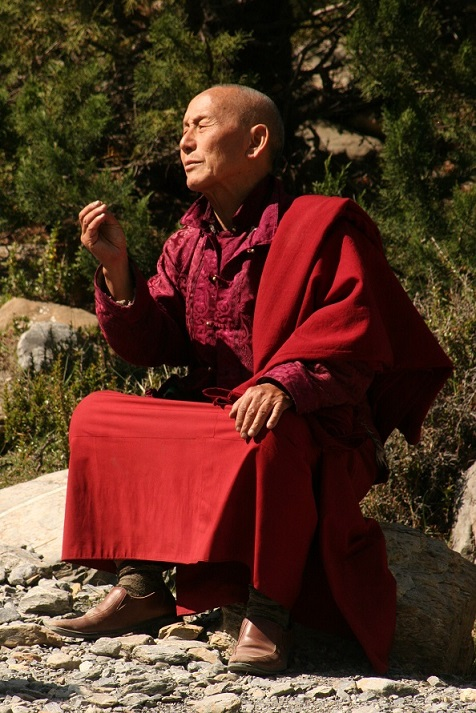
Chhairo Gompa: Lama Shashi Dhoj Tulachan, Chhairo, Lower Mustang, Nepal

Lama Shashi Dhoj Tulachan is the spiritual leader of Chhairo Gompa having been given responsibility for Chhairo Gompa by the current incarnation who is not a practicing lama. He is responsible for the physical reconstruction of the gompa as well as the teaching of the young monks from Mid West Region who have been brought to re-establish the gompa's monastic purpose.

== Religious art ==
The original wall paintings in both chapels are blackened with dirt and smoke from centuries of burning butter lamps and incense and have also suffered significant damage from water seepage. (c) 2013 renovation to the interior of either chapel has not been undertaken.

=== Main gompa ===
Lama Chhiwang Thilen, Chhairo gompa's founder, is believed to have painted the original frescoes in sMon and Gya Bris styles. They are predominantly in the sMon Bris style with elements of U Birs and even Bal Bris. The original frescoes in the lhakang were washed off and redone by Kamal Dhoj Tulachan, Shashi Dhoj Tulachan's father in 1960. (c) 1981 the central altar statue was a Sakyamuni (c) 1994 the central figure at the gompa altar was a clay image of Sakyamuni, flanked by his disciples, Ananda and Sariputra. Numerous small statues of Chhairo Gompa's past lamas and benefactors are also found. A lifelike clay image of the founder, Chhiwang Thilen, sat on the right corner of the altar. The interior of the roof lantern was panelled with slate carvings.

=== Padmasambhava Chapel ===
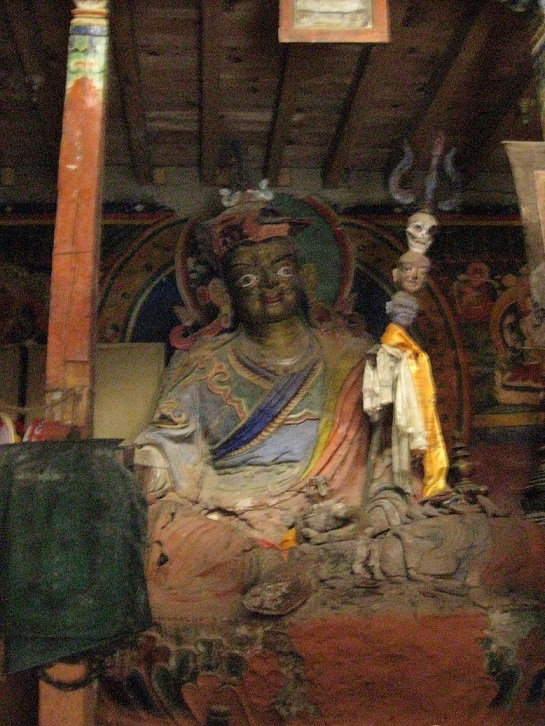
Chhairo Gompa: Padmasambhava statue, Chhairo, Lower Mustang, Nepal

A 3m clay and bamboo Padmasambhava statue dominates the room and is believed to have been created by Khaipa Chh'ekoup. The most recent wall paintings are attributed to Lama Kamal Dhoj Tulachan, a famous painter of Mustang and the father of Shashi Dhoj Tulachan. (c) 2013 the paintings that can be seen were completed in 1953 and are in the sMon Bris style.

== Architecture ==
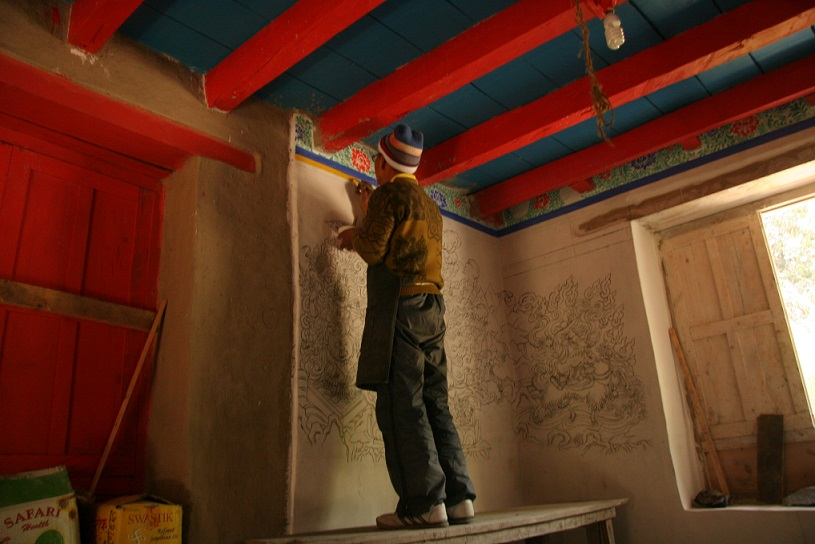
Chhairo Gompa, Chakra Tulachan painting in the new gyalpo

The Chhairo Gompa complex follows the traditional flat roof structures of the Mustang region with stone walls and consists of a temple courtyard, head lama quarters, kitchen and the monks’ quarters and stables.

=== The main gompa courtyard ===
The temple compound has two religious rooms; the main shrine room and the smaller adjacent Padmasambhava chapel; that face inward onto a slate paved courtyard that was bounded on the other three sides by two-story galleries where visiting guests could view ritual Cham dance. Only the northern verandas are still standing.

The main shrine room rises above the remaining structures and is capped with a small central lantern providing the only natural source of light.

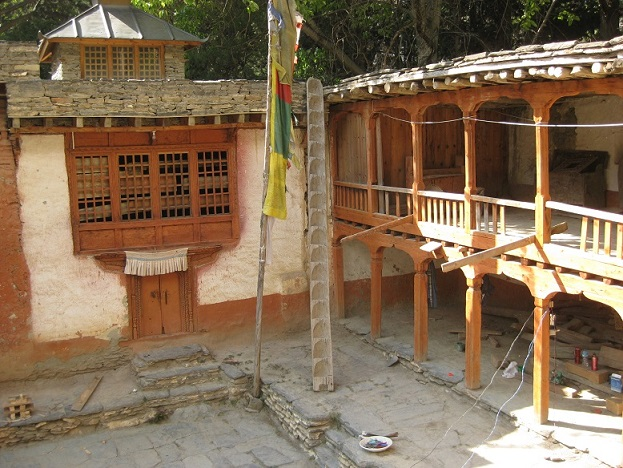
Chhairo gompa Padmasambhava chapel + dalan gallery from courtyard, Chhairo, Lower Mustang, Nepal

The Padmasambhava chapel (Sanga Choling) is immediately adjacent to the north east and is also capped by a small lantern. It is believed to have been constructed in the 18th century by Lama Sangye. This shrine room currently also serves as the gyalpo since the original gyalpo collapsed. Two statues of the guardian deities are currently housed here. They will be relocated to the new gyalpo when it is completed © 2013.

The dry stone masonry walls are approximately a metre thick with a timber ring beam about one metre beneath the roof acts as a tie. The walls of the Lhakhang and the Shrine room facing the courtyard are mud plastered, reddish clay for the Lhakhang and white clay for the chapel.

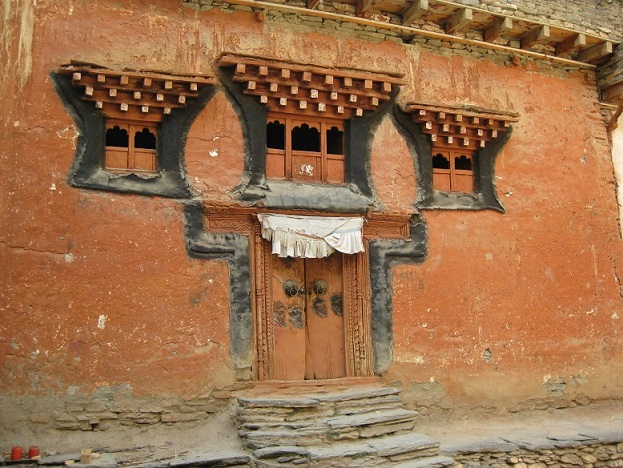
view of Chhairo Gompa lhakang, Chhairo, Lower Mustang, Nepal

The windows and doors are in a Newari style influenced by the craftspeople of the Thak area. They are modestly carved but have been heavily over painted. The three upper windows to the Lhakhang incorporate standard Tibetan details creating the lintels to the openings and painted black. The Lhakhang doors have embossed knobs and are decorated with Tibetan inscriptions. A pair of carved images fixed to the Lhakhang's inner doorjambs are said to be Dvarapala or guardians to the temple.

=== The Head Lama's Quarters and Kitchen ===
Structures housing the Head Lama's quarters and the gompa's original kitchen enclose the courtyard. The kitchen area, in the northeast corner of the courtyard was composed of three rooms: a cooking/eating area, a storeroom and a room for washing. The adjacent Head Lama quarters were on the same level but took advantage of a sloping site and were built as an upper floor above ground level stables.

The outer walls remain generally sound, but the Lama's quarters had completely collapsed. Restoration work was completed in 2012 providing living, bathroom, kitchen quarters for the Lama, a sleeping area for the young monks as well as additional rooms for visitors. The new Gyalpo is located at the top of this structure, and is currently being decorated © 2013.

Since 2005 the kitchen has been located in a single story room to the west of the courtyard.

=== The Monks’ Quarters and Stables ===
The monks’ quarters and stables are to the east of the lama's quarters and, for the most part have collapsed, although the foundation walls are largely intact. This part of the complex originally consisted of two open courtyards divided by a central spine wall running east–west. The wall divided the space into two separate, approximately square courtyards measuring 20 by 20 metres.

The northern section is a single-story structure built on higher ground. An internal stone and earth walkway within the northern courtyard provided space for the occupants to sit outside their quarters. The southern courtyard complex is built on lower ground and is generally two stories, allowing space for livestock to be housed in the lower floor and space for living quarters on the upper level. The floors were rammed earth with timber joists and planking laid over. Although this section of the complex is the most dilapidated, it is the section that is most suitable for development and possible expansion.

== Restoration Plans ==
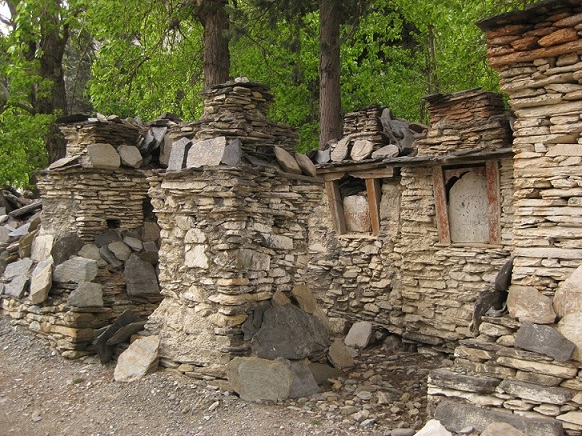
Chhairo Gompa mani wall, Chhairo, Lower Mustang, Nepal

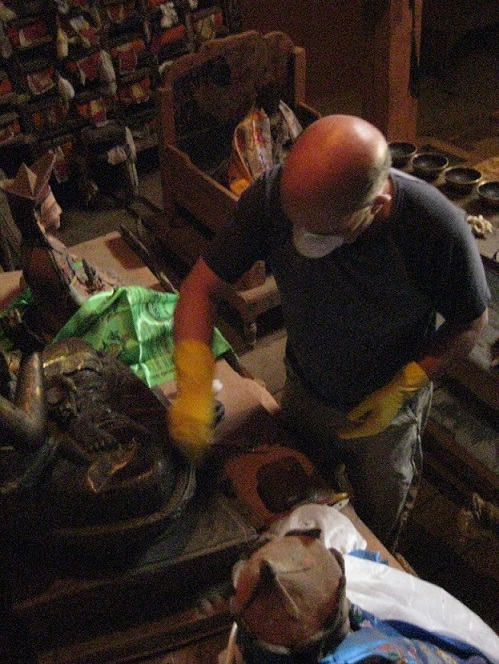
Chhairo Gompa restoration volunteers

There is a three-phase restoration plan:

- Phase IA –emergency repairs and rehabilitation of the temple compound
- Phase IB – recreate as near as possible the original layout and appearance of the head lama quarters and kitchens while improving and upgrading the accommodations
- Phase II – rebuild the monks’ quarters and stables for development as a training centre for Buddhist arts.

Long-term plans anticipate converting the stable areas into habitable space, providing living quarters for monks. The structures around the northern courtyard could be used as classrooms and studios for Buddhist art training, Buddhist retreat or a crafts centre to help revitalize the local economy.
