= The Saltmen of Tibet =

1997 documentary film directed by Ulrike Koch

- Directed by: Ulrike Koch
- Screenplay by: Ulrike Koch
- Produced by: Christoph Bicker; Alfi Sinniger; Knut Winkler
- Starring: Margen; Pargen; Zopon
- Cinematography: Pio Corradi
- Edited by: Magdolna Rokob
- Music by: Frank Wulff; Stefan Wulff
- Release date: 1997
- Running time: 108 minutes
- Countries: Germany; Switzerland
- Languages: Tibetan; Secret Saltmen Language; German

The Saltmen of Tibet is a 1997 film that chronicles the trek undertaken by a clan of Tibetan salt harvesters across scenic but dangerous territory from their settlement to the sacred lakes where salt is harvested. The salt is then traded for foodstuffs to maintain the clan for the following year. Woven into the movie are excerpts of a Tibetan singer from the tribe telling the tale of King Gesar of Ling, a traditional Tibetan epic.

The dialogue in the film is in Tibetan with English subtitles.

== Awards ==
- Cineprix Swisscom Swiss audiences' choice as best documentary of 1997
- Cariddi d'Oro (Best Film) 1997 Taormina Film Fest
- Sonje Award for Best Foreign Independent Film 1997 Pusan International Film Festival
- Golden Spire Award 1998 San Francisco International Film Festival
- Prix Nanook (Grand Prix) 1998 Dix-septième Bilan du Film Ethnographique, Paris

== See also ==
- Tibet-Nepal salt trade route
- Himalaya (film)
