= Yogesh Gauchan Thakali =

Nepalese politician

Yogesh Gauchan Thakali MP
- योगेश गौचन थकाली

Coordinator for Culture, Tourism and Civil Aviation
- Incumbent
- Assumed office 1 June 2026
- Leader: Bhishma Raj Angdembe
- Preceded by: Devendra Raj Kandel (2019)

Member of Parliament, Prainidhi Sabha
- Incumbent
- Assumed office 22 December 2022
- Preceded by: Prem Prasad Tulachan
- Constituency: Mustang 1

Personal details
- Born: 9 May 1993 (age 33) Thasang, Mustang
- Party: Nepali Congress
- Parent(s): Romy Gauchan Thakali (Father); Lakshmi Gauchan Thakali (Mother)
- Education: Bachelor of Business Management

Yogesh Gauchan Thakali is a Nepalese politician and member of Nepali Congress and currently serves as the Coordinator for Culture, Tourism and Civil Aviation since 2026.

He was elected in 2022 to the House of Representatives from Mustang 1, Nepal. He was re-elected to the house in the 2026 general elections.

He is the son of Romy Gauchan Thakali.
