= Ulrike Koch =

German sinologist and film maker (born 1950)

- Born: 1950; Birkenfeld, West Germany
- Died: 30 March 2024

Ulrike Koch (1950 – 30 March 2024) was a German sinologist and film maker. She is known for creating the documentary The Saltmen of Tibet.

== Life ==
Koch was born in Birkenfeld/Nahe in 1950. She studied sinology at the University of Zurich and Chinese literature at Beijing University. In 1995 she made a film titled Qigong: Die Kunst der Stille als Lebenselixier.

Koch made The Saltmen of Tibet, where the main language is Tibetan. She had already worked on two Bernardo Bertolucci films before she set out to make The Saltmen of Tibet. She had studied the culture of Tibet and ethnography and this enabled her to write the script. Her experience of being a casting director on The Last Emperor and working on Little Buddha was important.

Koch had heard of the traders who travelled each year to the salt lakes in Changthang area to gather salt and she managed to get clearance to film in Tibet. The film focuses on recording the traders' journey which has been taking place annually since ancient times. The film suggests that competition from more mechanised approaches may soon end this tradition.

Using mini dv equipment and keeping a low profile, the film crew of four people created the documentary in three months. Later on, the edited images were transferred to 35mm film. The movie was shown in many countries and won many international awards.

In 2003 she made a film called Ässhäk - Tales from the Sahara and in 2011 another titled Regilaul - Songs from the Ancient Sea.

Koch died on 30 March 2024.
