= Marpha =

Marpha मार्फा
- Village
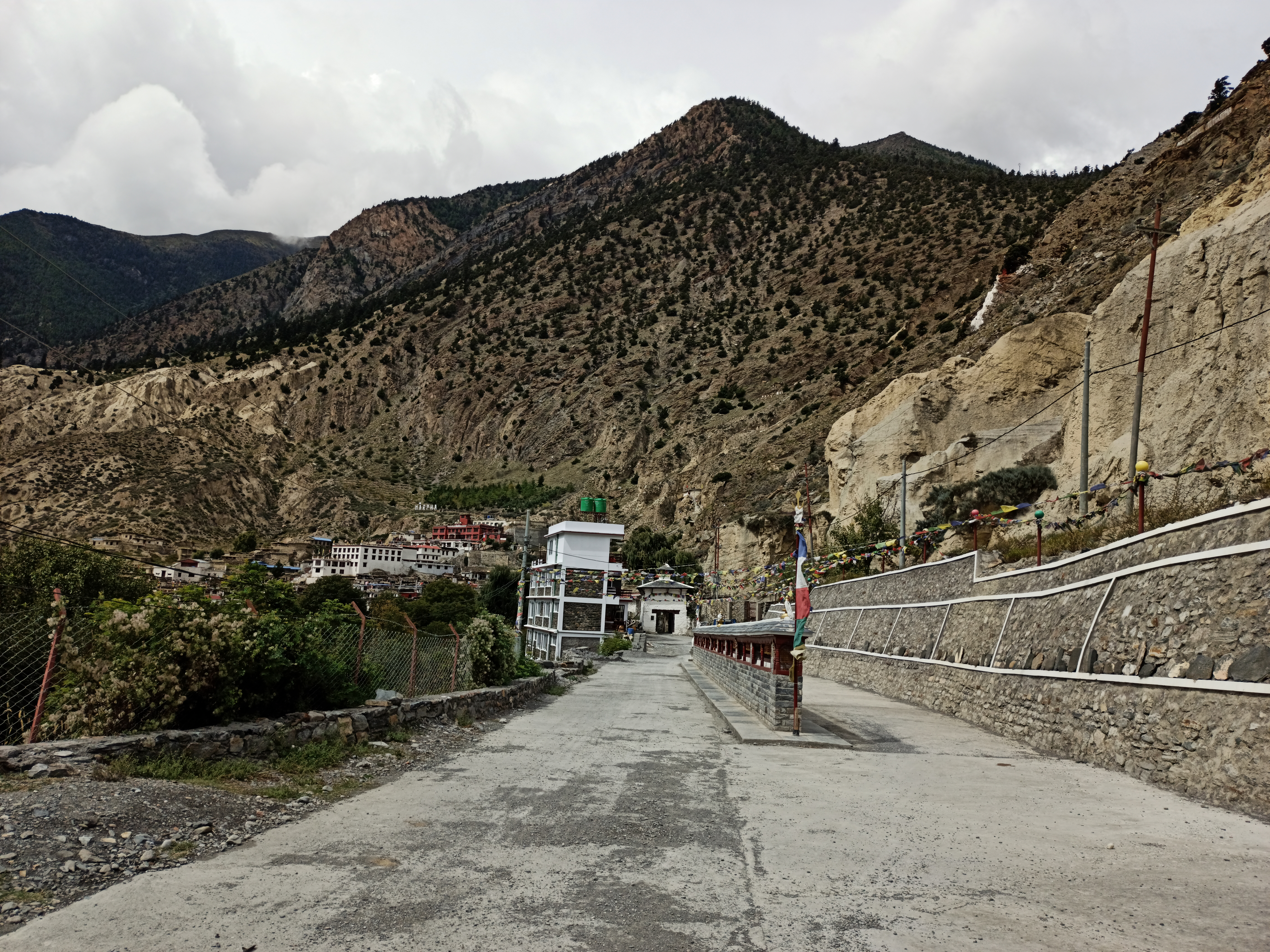
- Marpha, Jerry Galli end point.

- Location in Nepal Marpha (Nepal)
- Coordinates: 28°47′24″N 83°40′48″E
- Country: Nepal
- Zone: Dhawalagiri Zone
- District: Mustang District

Population (1991)
  - Total: 1,630
- Time zone: UTC+5:45 (Nepal Time)

Marpha is a village in Mustang District in the Dhawalagiri Zone of northern Nepal. At the time of the 1991 Nepal census it had a population of 1630 people living in 434 individual households.

WThe village is a part of the trekking industry, and has a nearby Tibetan refugee camp. Tibetans from the camp work in the village, supporting the tourist and trekking service sector. It is in a scenic location and apples are an important crop for the area.

Formerly, Marpha was a village development committee (VDC), which were local-level administrative units. In 2017, the government of Nepal restructured local government in line with the 2015 constitution and VDCs were discontinued.

== Sights ==
Marpha is a stone-paved village that has adapted to modern economic changes by providing services to tourists and trekkers. The village is a common overnight halt on the Annapurna Circuit, less crowded and touristy than Jomsom to the north.

The name itself reflects the "mar" meaning hard working and "pha" meaning people. Ethnically, they are known as the Thakali people. Tourism and mule rearing are the means of survival of the people of this place. Although it has an original Safe Water Drinking station, it now also sports numerous guest houses and small hotels.

The village is the apple capital in the nation, with Marpha brandy and jams produced from local fruits.

Dominating the village is the Nyingma monastery from which there are good views of the village and the Gandaki River valley. Above the monastery is a chorten painted onto the cliff face and a number of small stone chortens on the ledges below. Legend says that the villagers became afflicted with leprosy and all attempts to control it had failed. A local monk, originally from Tukuche, south of Marpha, advised the villagers to build the chorten and hold religious rituals at the site. Since that time the leprosy stopped and Marpha flourished once more.

On the southern outskirts of Marpha, on the opposite bank of the Gandaki River is a Tibetan refugee camp and Chhairo gompa, the first Nyingma monastery to be established in Mustang District.

Many of the souvenir shops in Marpha are run by residents of the Tibetan refugee camp.

== Climate ==
Marpha has a cold semi-arid climate (BSk) with cold, dry winters and mild, slightly wet summers.

Climate data for Marpha (Thakmarpha), elevation 2,566 m (8,419 ft), (1976–2005)
Month	Jan	Feb	Mar	Apr	May	Jun	Jul	Aug	Sep	Oct	Nov	Dec	Year
Mean daily maximum °C (°F)	10.3 (50.5)	11.3 (52.3)	14.4 (57.9)	17.5 (63.5)	19.3 (66.7)	21.0 (69.8)	21.2 (70.2)	21.2 (70.2)	19.7 (67.5)	16.9 (62.4)	13.9 (57.0)	11.7 (53.1)	16.5 (61.8)
Mean daily minimum °C (°F)	−2.0 (28.4)	0.8 (33.4)	1.9 (35.4)	4.8 (40.6)	7.9 (46.2)	11.4 (52.5)	13.2 (55.8)	13.0 (55.4)	10.6 (51.1)	5.2 (41.4)	1.4 (34.5)	−1.1 (30.0)	5.6 (42.1)
Average precipitation mm (inches)	7.3 (0.29)	15.3 (0.60)	31.4 (1.24)	29.5 (1.16)	32.9 (1.30)	47.0 (1.85)	67.2 (2.65)	63.4 (2.50)	49.4 (1.94)	34.7 (1.37)	7.0 (0.28)	13.2 (0.52)	402.4 (15.84)
Source: Agricultural Extension in South Asia

== Gallery ==
Marpha

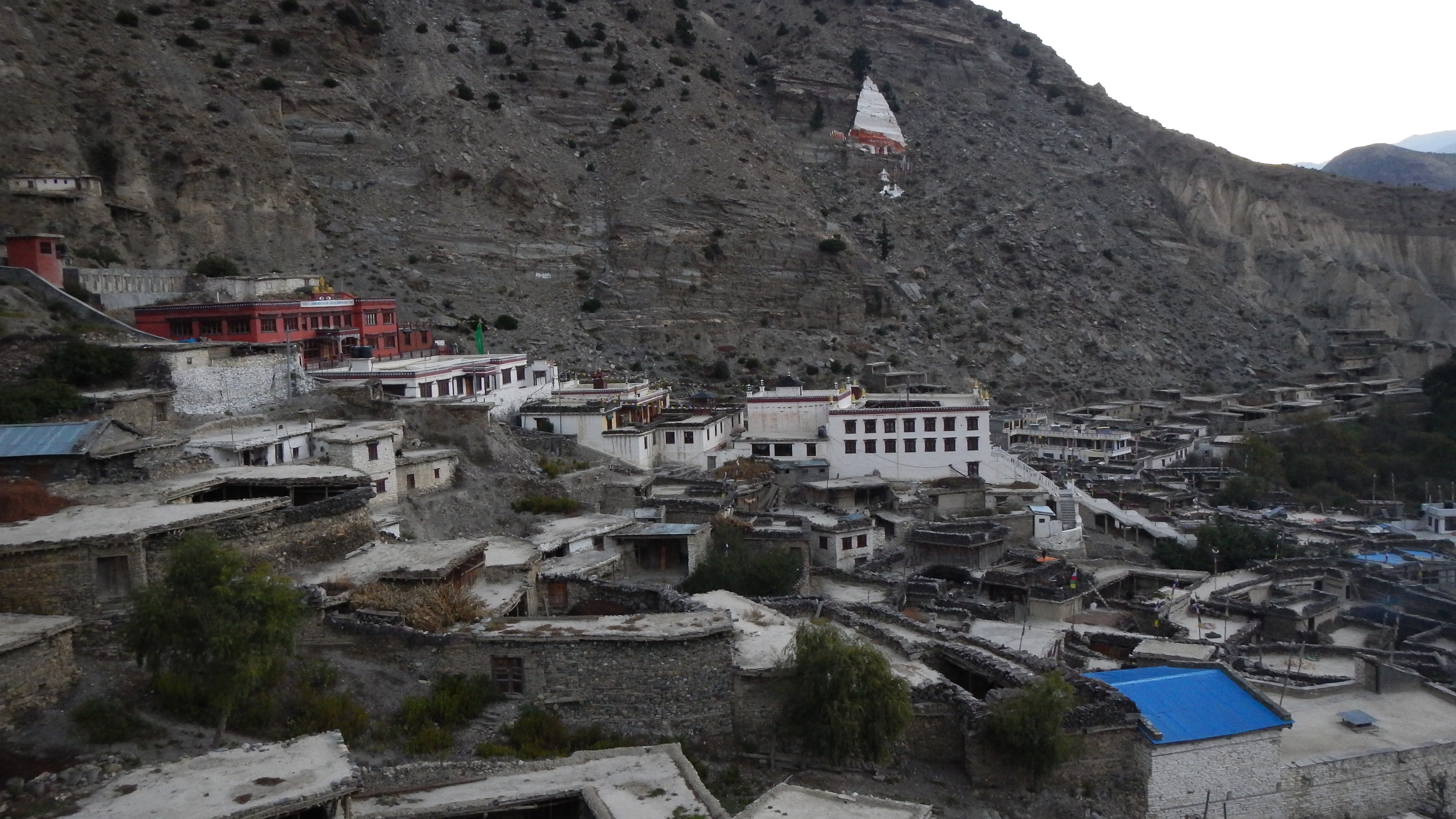

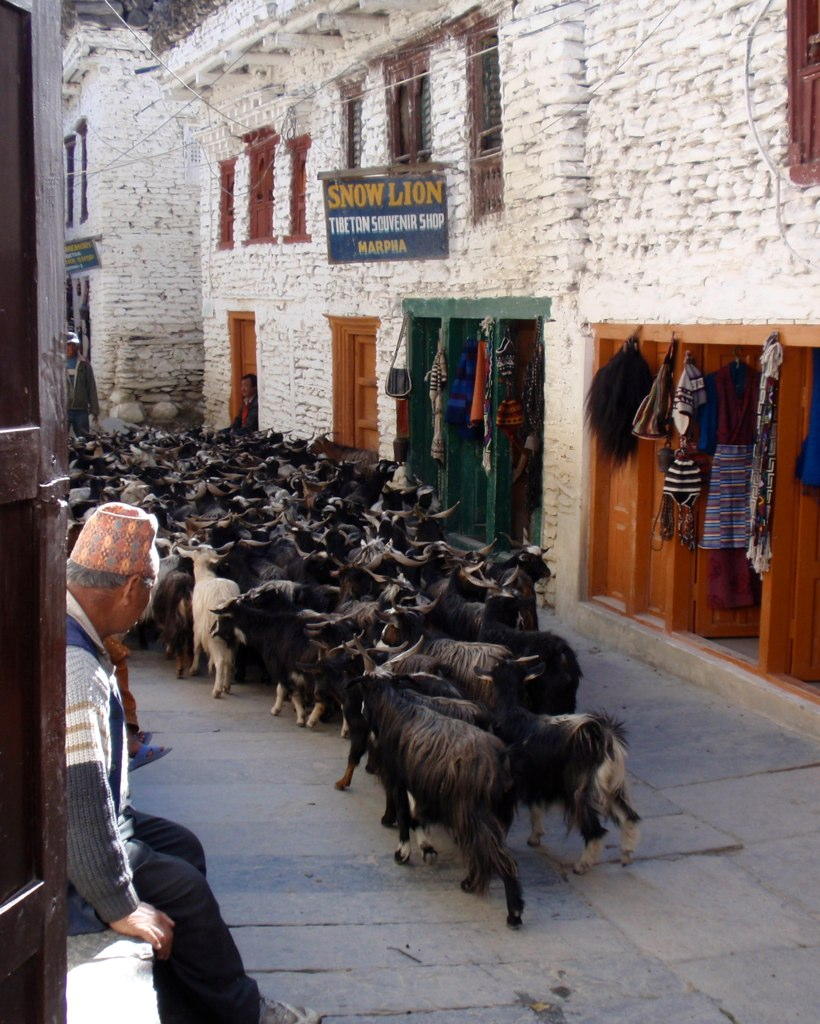

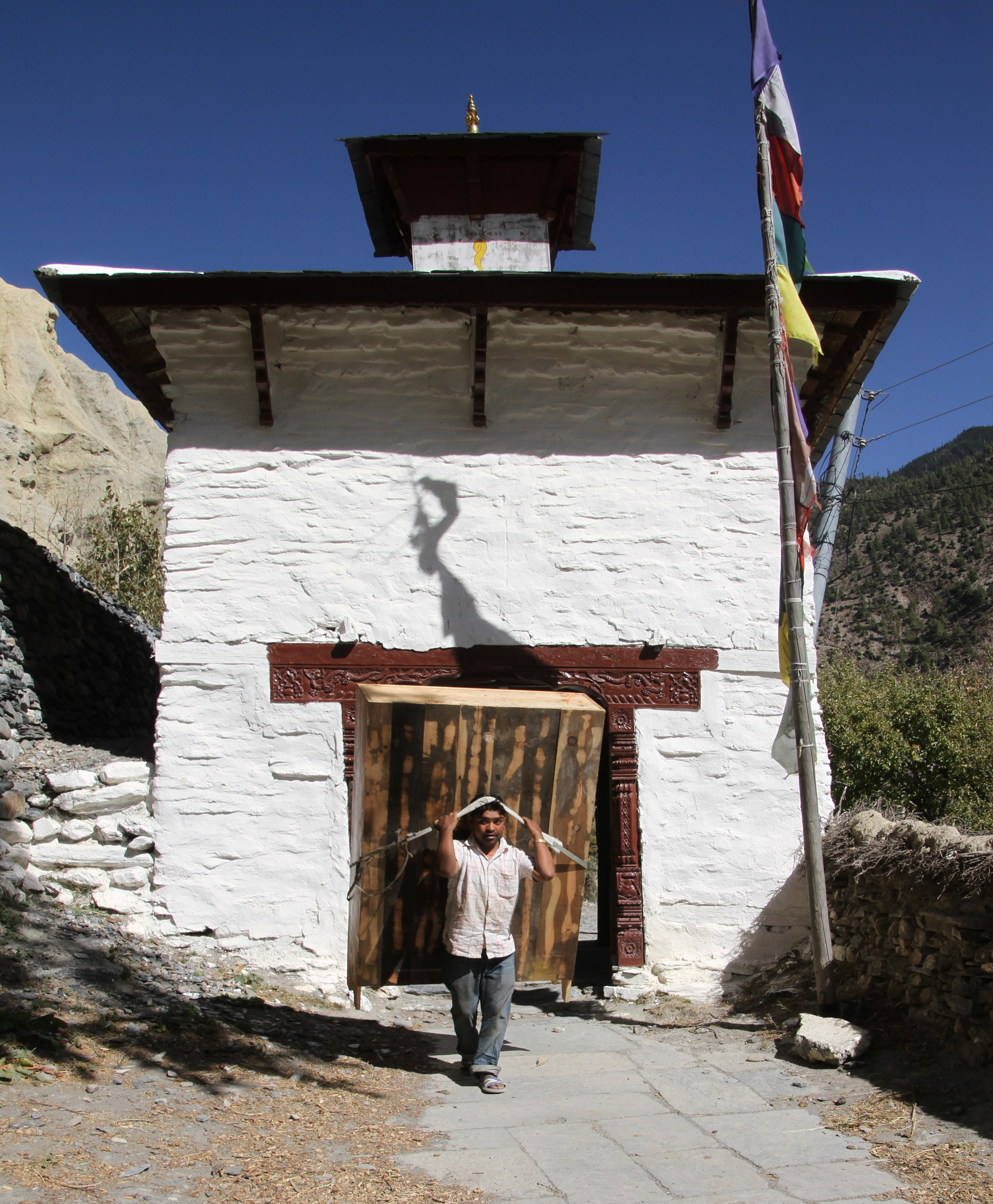

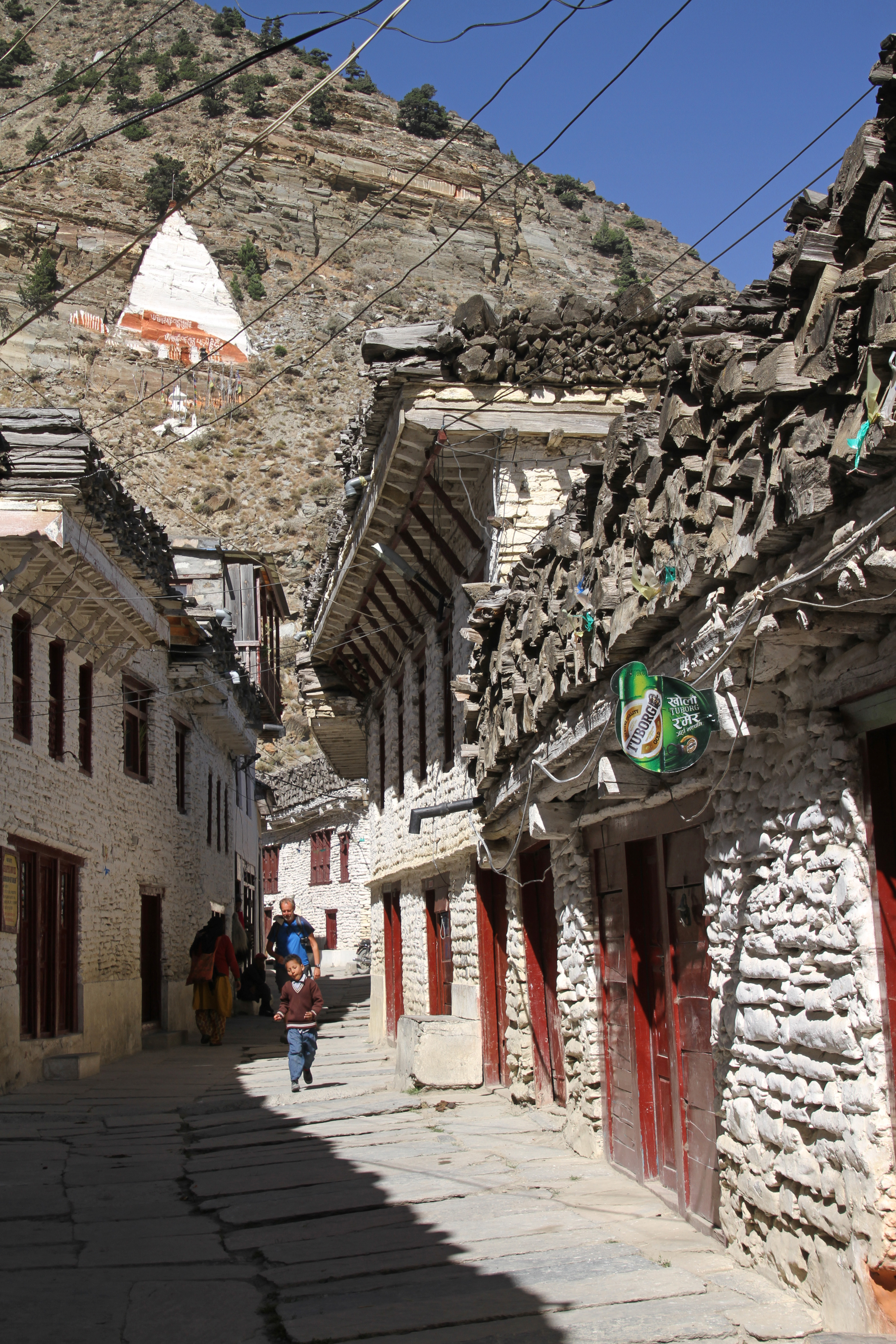

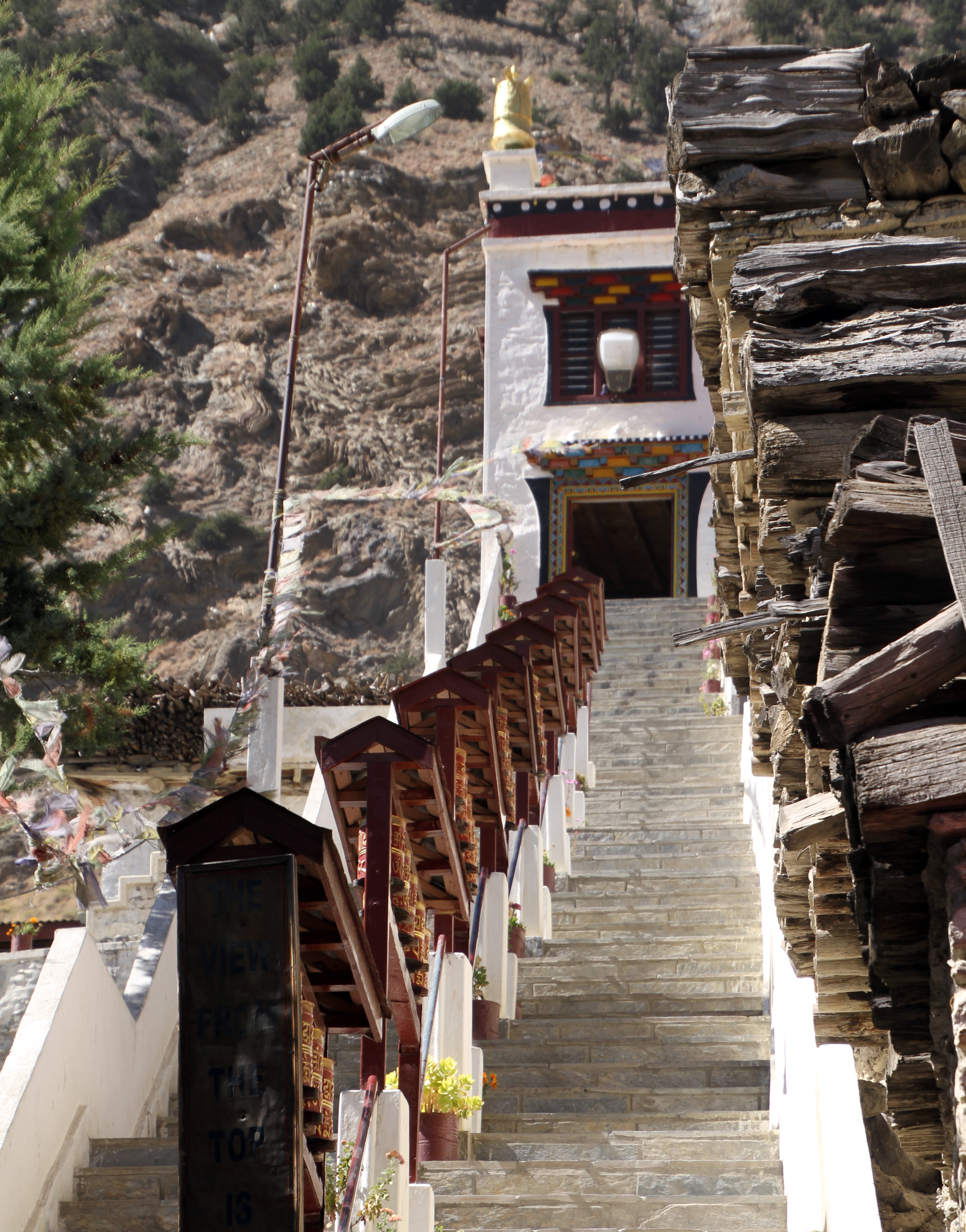

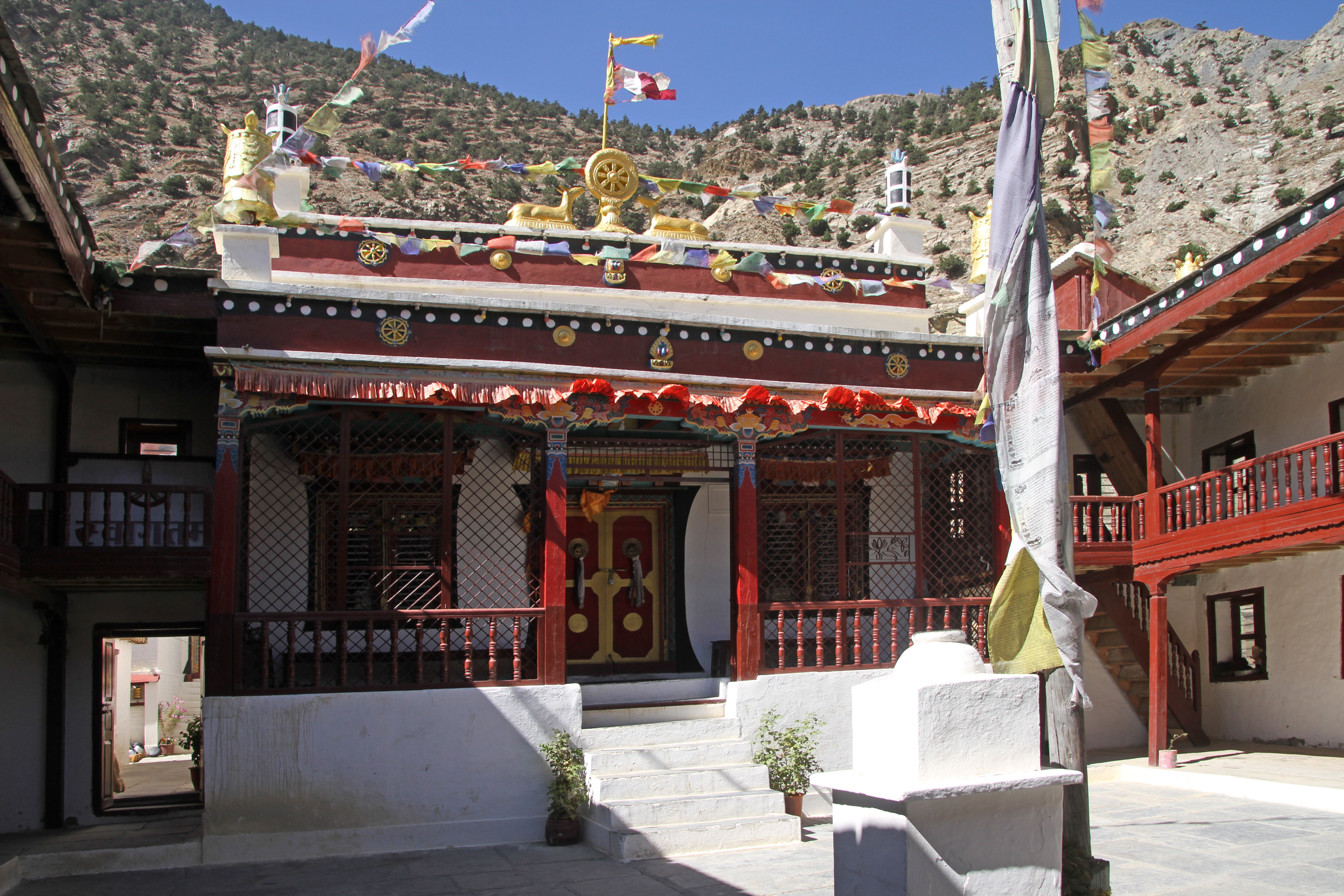

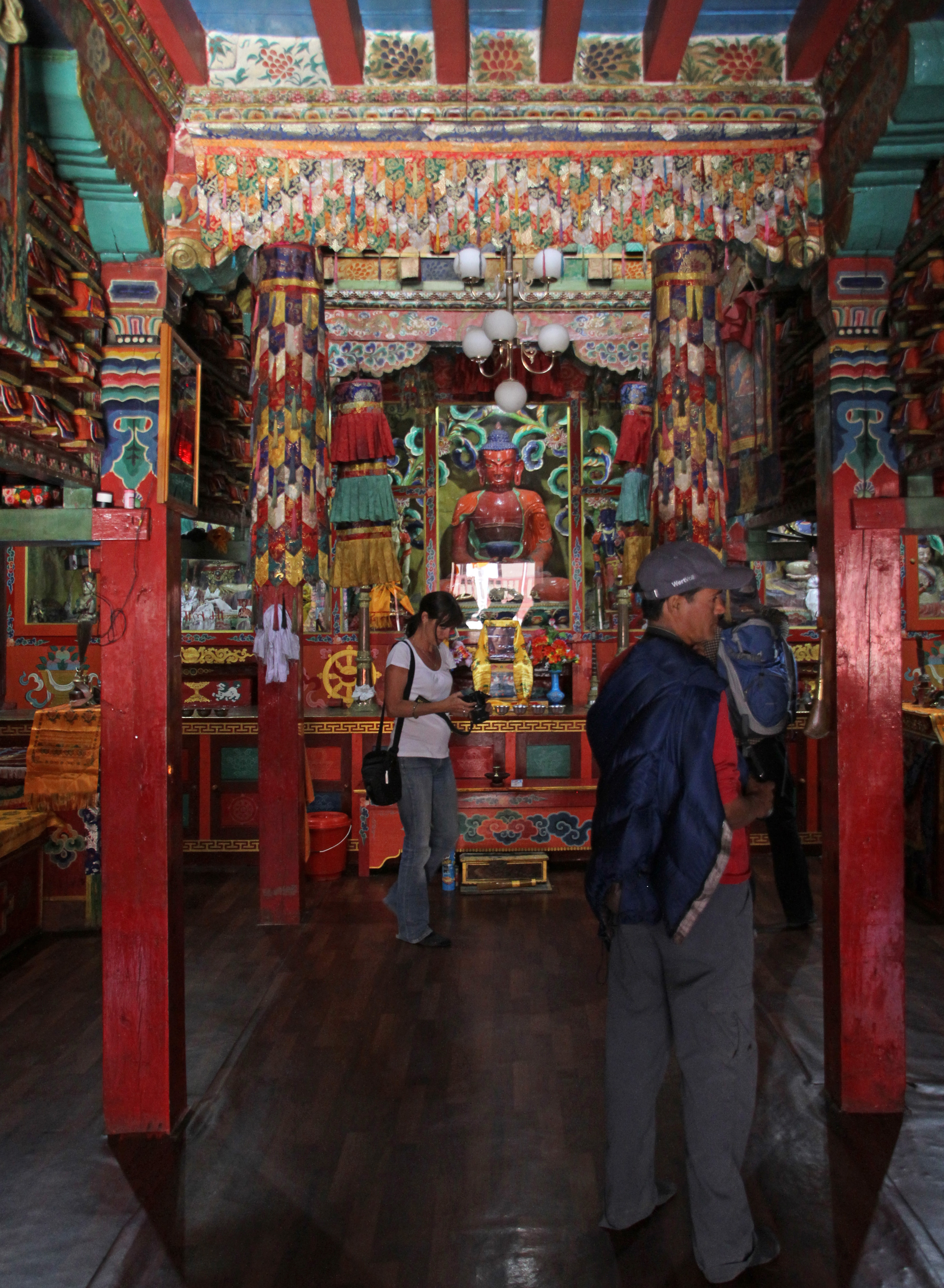

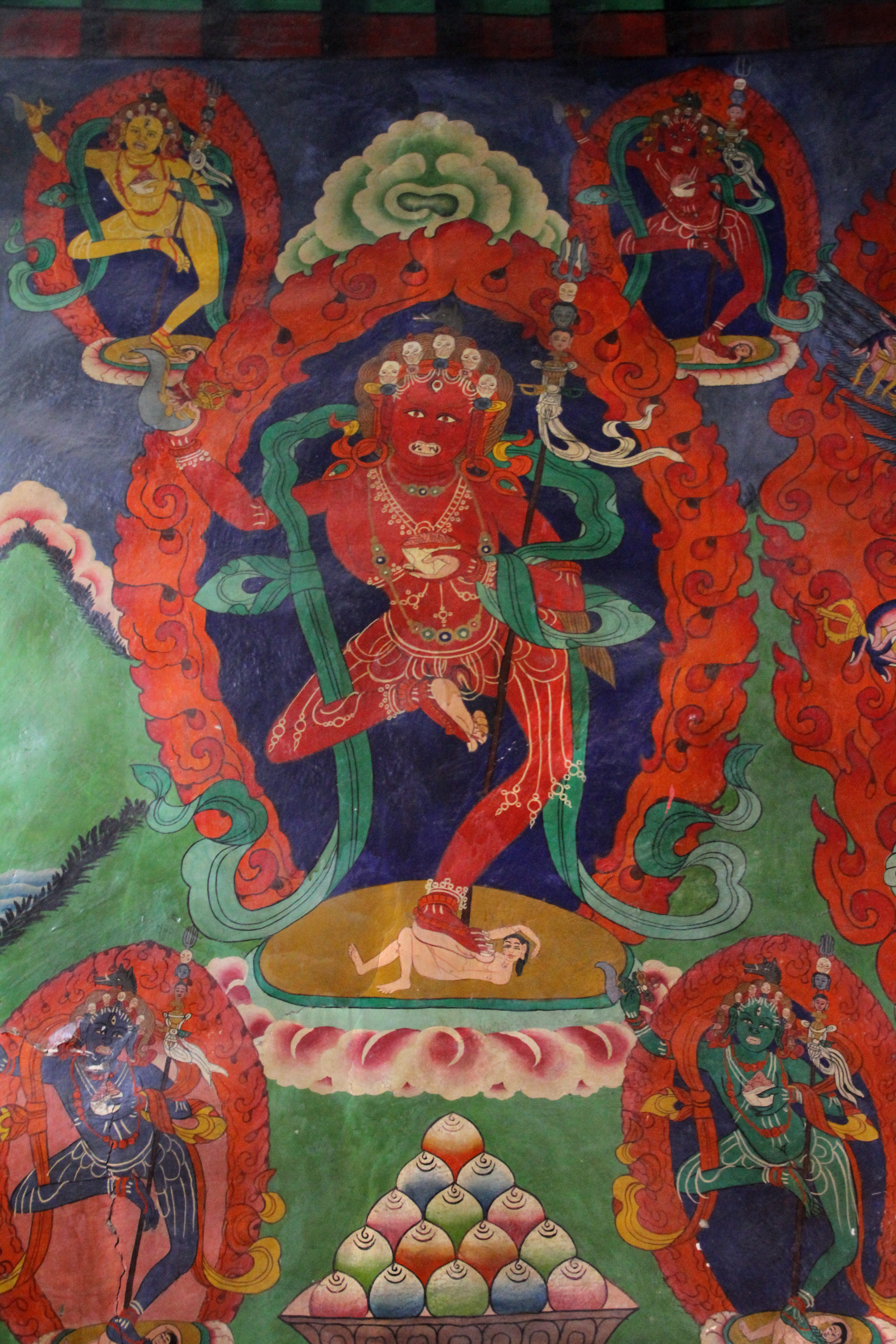

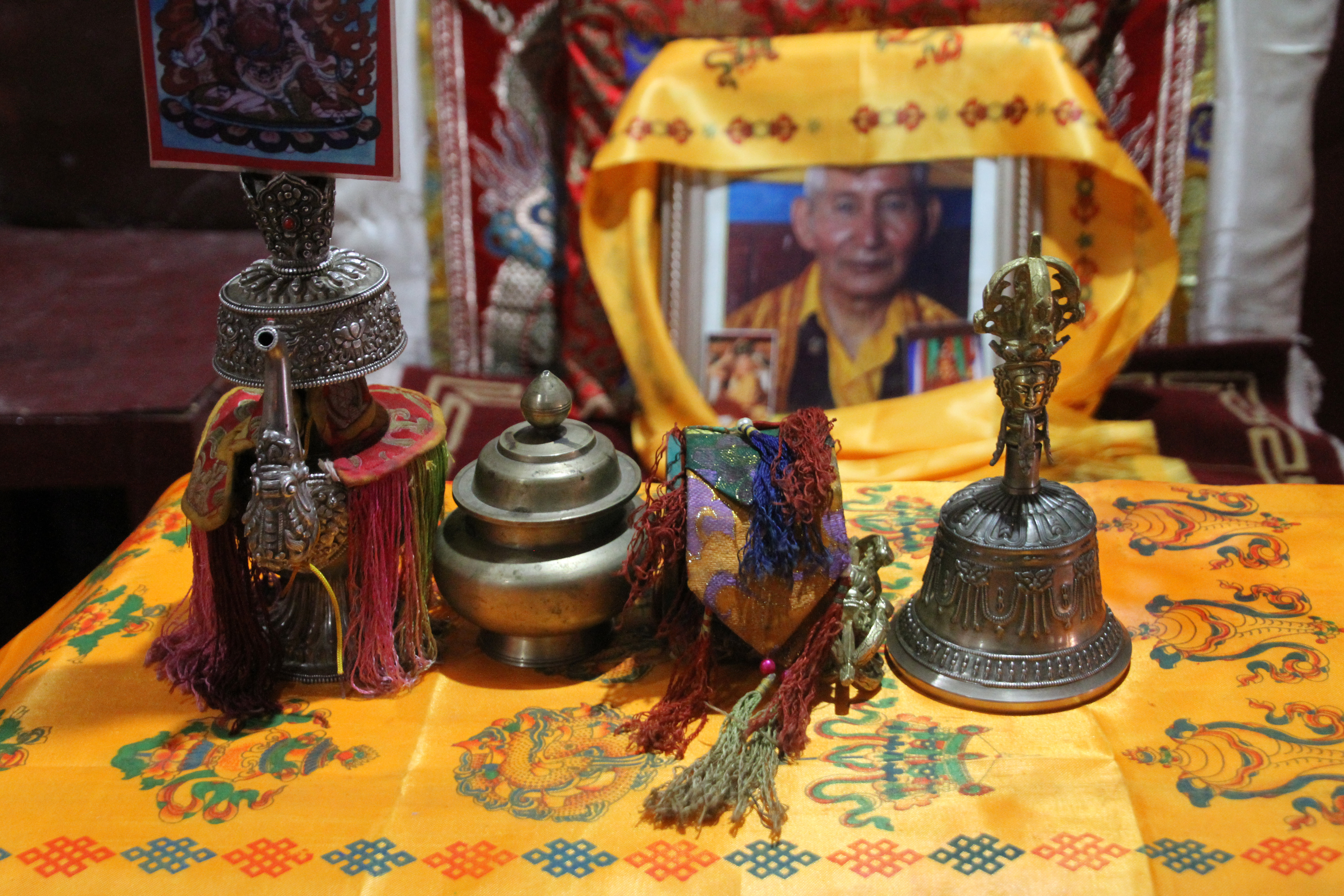

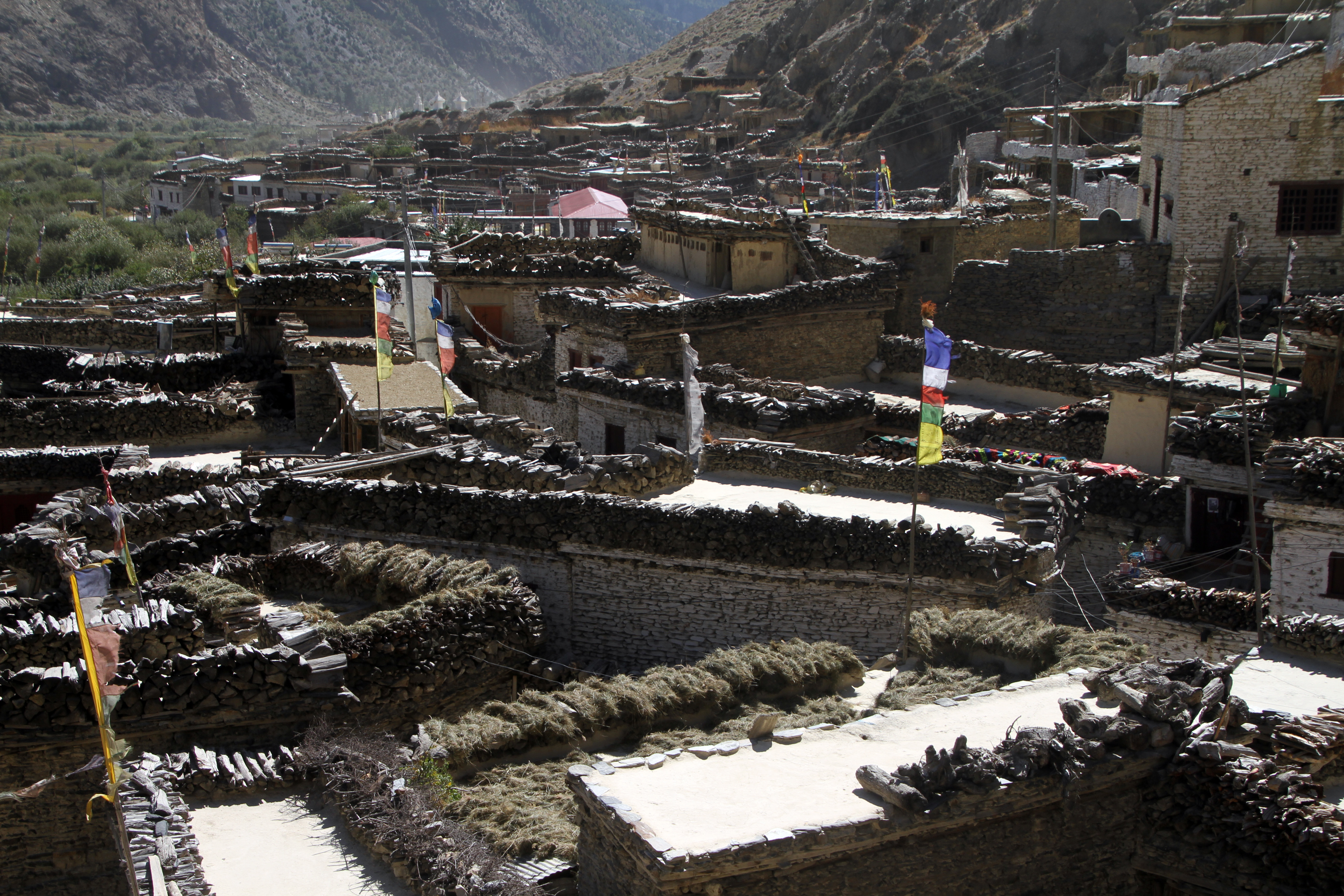

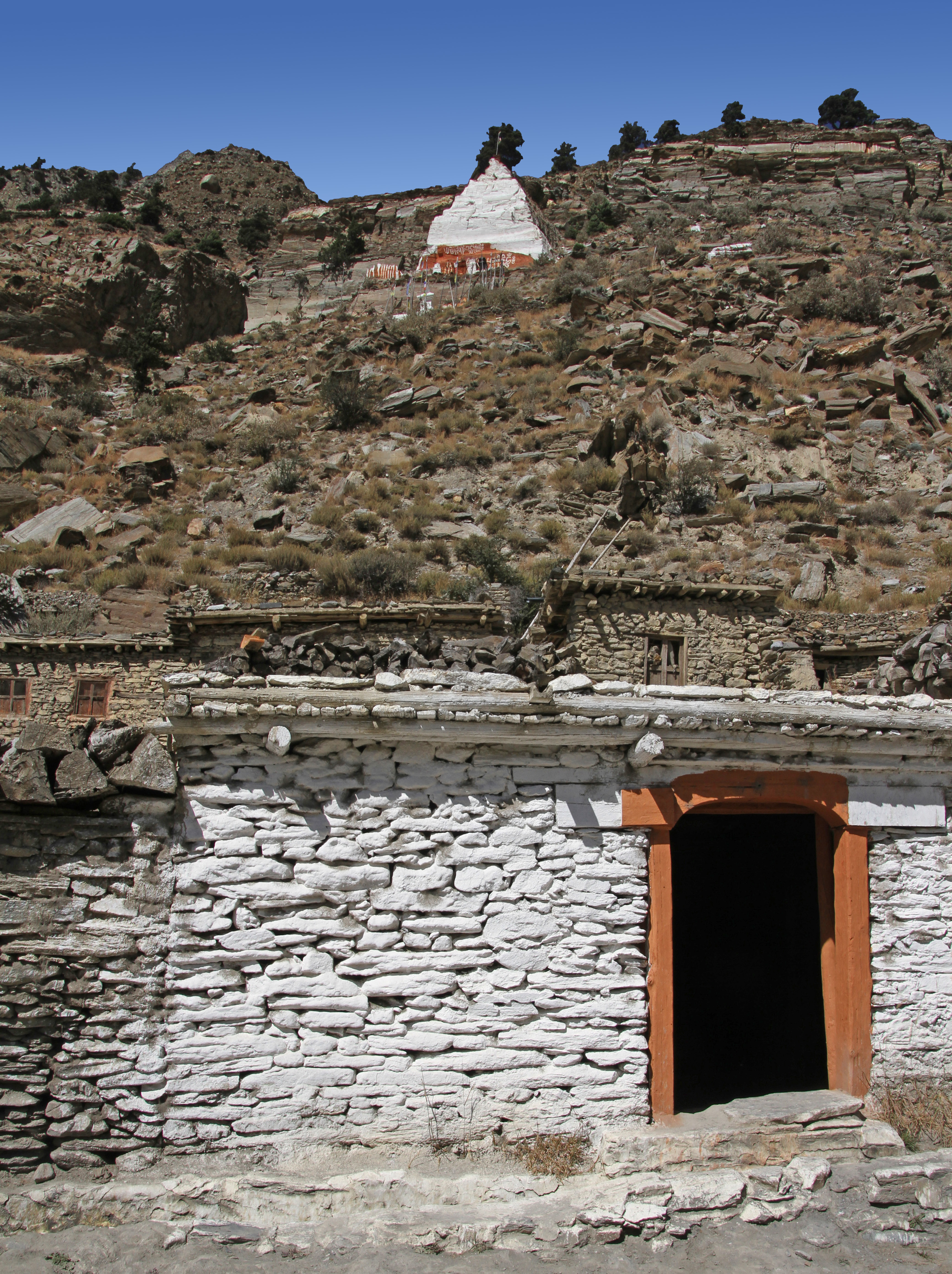
