= Toran La =

Festival of Thakali people in Nepal

Toran Lha
- Observed by: Thakali people
- Type: Ethnic
- Significance: Thakali New Year
- Celebrations: Ancestral worship, gathering and celebration
- Duration: 3 days
- Frequency: Annual

Toran-La is the biggest festival of Thakali people of Nepal. It falls on the same day as Holi (Falgun Purnima), generally falling in the month of March. The festival lasts for three days- before, after and during the night of the full moon.

In Toran La, ancestors are worshipped for their contribution to the community. Women from the family bath at midnight to prepare Khimi which consists of alcohol, milk and Chhaang and ghee at three ends. The Khimi is offered to ancestor. The other foods such as vegetables and cooked meat are also placed in a leaves plate called bota and burnt. The smoke is believed to reach the ancestors.

Besides praying the ancestor, the Thakali community meet in their community house. Men play the game of archery, which is known as Tara. In the game, the archer has to hit a dummy at a distance of about 10m and aim for the heart. Women dress up in traditional thakali dress called Noghan Cholo and play cards, dance for entertainment.

Because Holi also falls on the same day, it is also celebrated by using colors and water.
