= Shashi Dhoj Tulachan =

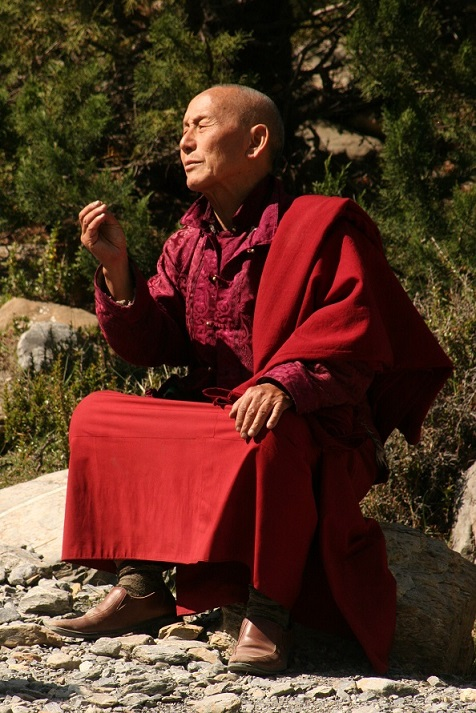
Chhairo Gompa: Lama Shashi Dhoj Tulachan, Chhairo, Lower Mustang, Nepal

Shashi Dhoj Tulachan, called Guru Nawang Chhogyall Tenzin, is the spiritual leader of the Chhairo gompa, of Nyingma Tibetan Buddhism, having been given responsibility for the Gompa by the current incarnation who is not a practising lama. He is also responsible for three gompas in Tukuche, his home village on the right bank of the Kali Gandaki, and in the Annapurna trail:

- Sambha gompa (Karmapa/Kagyu) - instituted in 1935
- Rani gompa
- Mahakala gompa - instituted in 1930 by four members of the Tulachan family including Shashi Dhoj's father, Kamal Dhoj Tulachan

== Family heritage ==
Lama Shashi is a master in Buddhist thangka painting and is committed to re-establishing residential monk community at Chhairo gompa. The Tulachan family is from the neighbouring village of Tukuche, to the south and comes from a long line of Buddhist artists. His father, Kamal Dhoj Tulachan, and grandfather are responsible for many wall paintings and statues to be found in gompas, chortens and private household shrines in villages of the Thak Kola (upper Kali Gandaki) area.

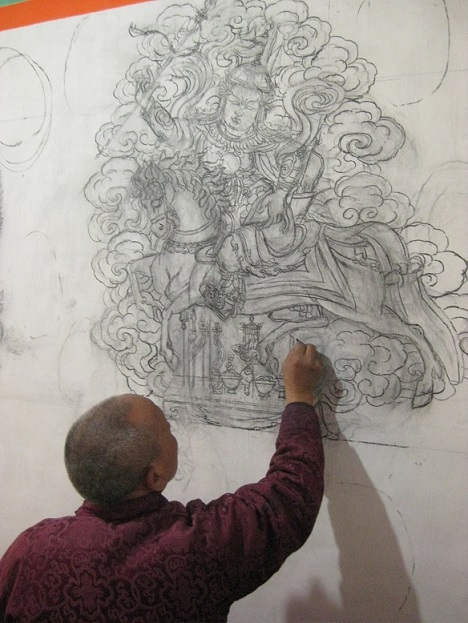
Chhairo Gompa: Lama Shashi drawing in the new gyalpo

Shashi began by assisting his father and elder brother, Krsna Dhoj Tulachan, aged 9, accompanying them to villages around Mustang. By the age of 18 he had received his first solo assignment to paint the Mani Lha K'an of Gemi village, Mustang.

=== Mustang monasteries ===
Evidence of Shashi Dhoj's work in monasteries and gompas of the Mustang area are recorded extensively in RK Rai's 1994 inventory of monasteries in Mustang.

Gompa/ Mani (branch)	Location	Date	Details	School
smad Kyi Lha K'an	Kobang	1960	assisting his father Kamal Dhoj Tulachan, new frescos	
Mani Lha K'an (Nyingmapa)	Gemi (Mustang)	1961-1962	First solo commission	sMon Bris
Rani Gompa (Kagyu)	Tukuche	1962-1963	assisting his father Kamal Dhoj Tulachan	new frescos
Bon dKar Gompa	Lupra	1961, 1966	assisting his father Kamal Dhoj Tulachan, new frescos to chapel walls	
Mani Lha K'an (private chapel owned by A S Lakma)	Thilim, Gemi (Mustang)	1963, 1991		sMon Bris
Utse Gompa (nGorpa Sakyapa)	Geling (Mustang)	1975		sMon Bris
Narsang Gompa (Nyingmapa)	Khanti	1960, 1975	main chapel walls, entire fresco removed and repainted	
Tashi Cholin (nGorpa Sakyapa	Geling (Mustang)	1989, 1991	gompa founded by Globo mKhenchen	sMon Bris
Don gNak Seng-se Chilin -new Kyipar Gompa (Nyingmapa)	Tukuche (Mustang)	1986, 1988		sMon Bris
Chhairo Gompa (Nyingmapa)	Chhairo (Mustang)	2013		

=== Statuary ===
Lama Shashi's statue work can be seen at Lumbini and he designs many of the Buddhist statues produced at Karma Samtenling monastery in Kathmandu. A number of his buddhist paintings have been exhibited internationally.

=== International exhibitions ===
Nine oversized thangka drawings from the Tibetan Karma Ghadri school of religious painting have been exhibited at the Bowers Museum in Santa Ana, California since 2013.

=== Japan mandalas ===
Mandalas painted by Shashi Dhoj Tulachan and his brother Cakra Dhoj Tulachan, are the centrepiece of the Toga Meiso no Sato meditation centre in Toga mura, Japan. Four 4 metre by 4 metre Mandala Thangkas were painted in Toga mura (Toga village), Toyama prefecture over 18 months in 1988 and 1989. The themes of the four mandalas are of:

- The Tibetan Book of the Dead
- Sukhavati (Amiitabha's Pure Land)
- Vajradhatu Mandala (Diamond Realm Mandala)
- Garbhadhatu Mandala (Womb Realm Mandala)

Shashi Dhoj returned to Toga mura, a sister village of Tukuche; Shashi Dhoj Tulachan's home village; in April 1991 for the opening of the meditation centre. He returned again in 1994 to paint a Mandala of the Two Realms, combining Japanese and Tibetan styles.
