= Prem Prasad Tulachan =

Nepalese politician

- प्रेम प्रसाद तुलाचन

Member of Parliament, Prainidhi Sabha
- In office 4 March 2018 – 18 September 2022
- Preceded by: Romy Gauchan Thakali
- Constituency: Mustang 1

Personal details
- Born: 22 June 1961 (age 64) Mustang District
- Party: CPN (UML)
- Other political affiliations: Nepali Congress

Prem Prasad Tulachan is a Nepalese politician affiliated with the Nepal Communist Party currently serving as the member of the 1st Federal Parliament of Nepal. In the 2017 Nepalese general election he was elected from the Mustang 1 constituency, securing 3544 (52.70%) votes.
