= Romy Gauchan Thakali =

Nepali politician

- रोमी गौचन थकाली

Minister of Commerce
- In office 26 August 2016 – 31 May 2017
- President: Bidhya Devi Bhandari
- Prime Minister: Puspha Kamal Dahal

Personal details
- Born: Mustang, Nepal
- Party: Nepali Congress
- Spouse: Lakshmi Gauchan Thakali
- Children: Yogesh Gauchan Thakali

Romy Gauchan Thakali (Nepali: रोमी गौचन थकाली) is a Nepalese politician. He was elected to the Pratinidhi Sabha in the 1999 election on behalf of the Nepali Congress.

His son Yogesh Gauchan Thakali was elected to the House Of Representatives in 2022.
