= Tukuche =

Tukuche टुकुचे
- Village development committee
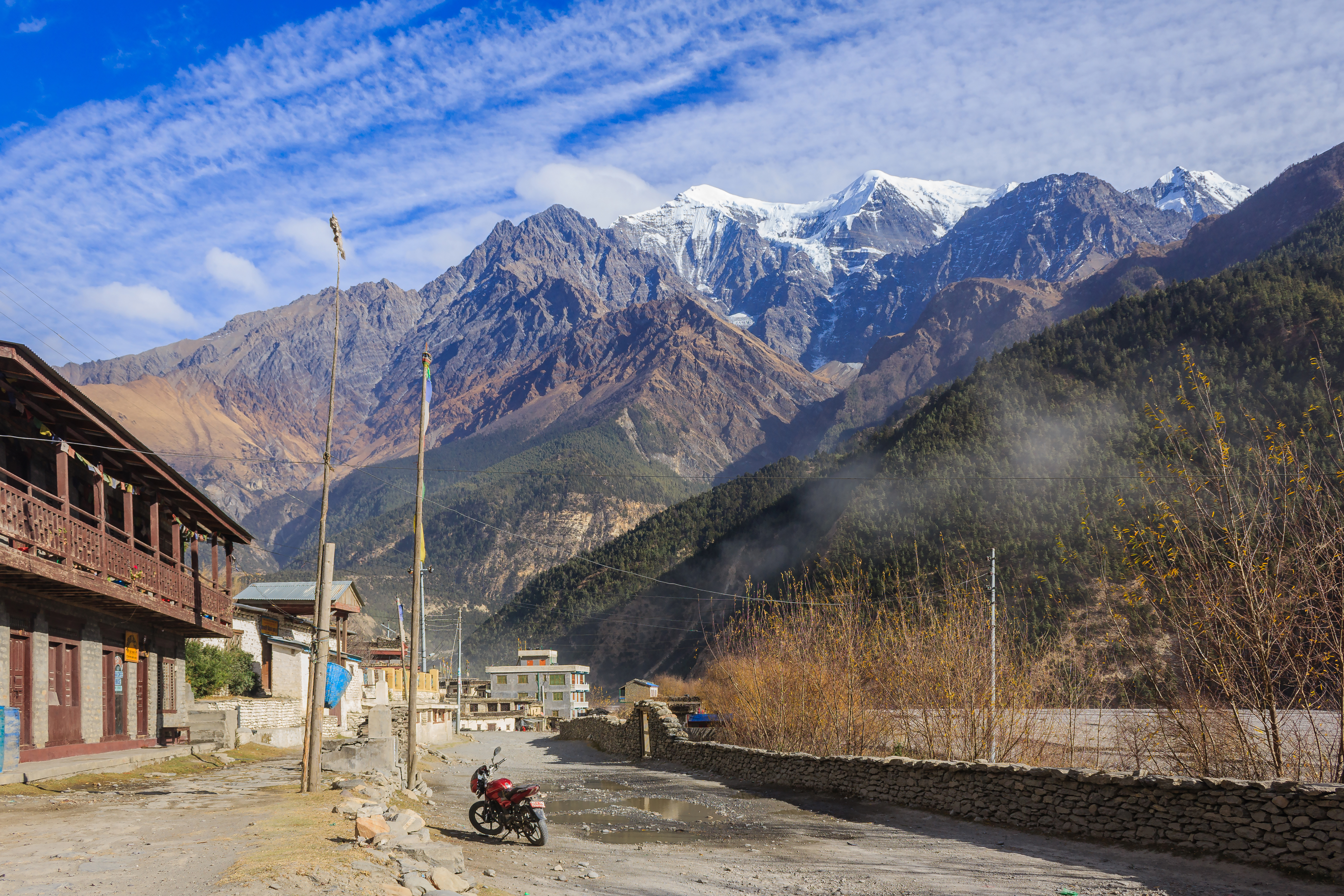

- Location in Nepal Tukuche (Nepal)
- Coordinates: 28.74°N 83.62°E
- Country: Nepal
- Zone: Dhawalagiri Zone
- District: Mustang District

Population (1991)
  - Total: 652
- Time zone: UTC+5:45 (Nepal Time)

Tukuche, sometimes spelt Tukche, is a village development committee in Mustang District in the Dhawalagiri Zone of northern Nepal. At the time of the 1991 Nepal census it had a population of 652 people living in 166 individual households.

The village is located in the Kali Gandaki Gorge, east of Tukuche Peak. It is a center of the Thakali people. These residing Thakali people brand the Thakali tradition, especially Thakali food items (Thakali Khana Set and Thakali Khaja Set), which is more trivial all around Nepal. Besides food, other attractions lie in the white plastered, wooden houses, dusty and dry land, and also the unique culture and lifestyle of people.

== Sights ==
There are a number of sights of interest in Tukuche:

1. Qpar Gompa
2. Rani Gompa
3. Sambha Gompa
4. Tukuche Distillery
5. Tukuche Toga Museum
6. Old Village of Tukuche
7. Thak library
8. Jhongo Apple Orchard
9. Manchin Khola
10. Ghindung
