= Thakali people =

Ethnolinguistic group

थकाली

Total population
- 11,743 (2021 census)

Languages
- Thakali language, Nepali

Religion
- Buddhism 68%, Hinduism 30%, Christianity 0.7%, Bon 0.7%

Related ethnic groups
- Tibetan, Gurung, Tamang people, Sherpa

The Thakali (Nepali: थकाली pronounced [tʰʌkali]) are an ethnolinguistic Tibeto-Burman ethnic group of Nepal. They are often regarded as the "richest caste" of Nepal. The traditional area of the Thakali community is called Thak-sat-se or the Thak Khola region and lies in the Kali Gandaki River valley in the Mustang District, Gandaki Province in western Nepal. According to the 2001 census, the Thakali population of around 12,973 constituted only 0.06% of Nepal's population. By the 2011 Nepal census, there were 13,215 Thakali people in Nepal.

The Lhafewa (Barha Barse Kumbha Mela), Toranlha (ancestral worship) and Falo (Kumar Yatra) are the major festivals of Thakalis. Dhnom is the title of the Thakali priest who performs the work of the local shaman. The madal, khaprang and thamken are their main musical instruments.

There are four groups who consider themselves Thakali; all four castes are different according to the Census of Nepal. They are Teen Gauley (the Thakali from Thini, Syang and Chimang villages), Marphali (Thakali from Marpha village, further subclassified as Hirachan, Pannachan, Jwarchan, and Lalchan), Chaar Jaat or "four castes" (Sherchan, Tulachan, Bhattachan, Gauchan) and Thakali (those Thakali from Southern Mustang, Tukuche, and Jomsom). These groups consider themselves to be part of different castes but all still Thakali. The customs, culture, dress and festivals of each differ slightly.

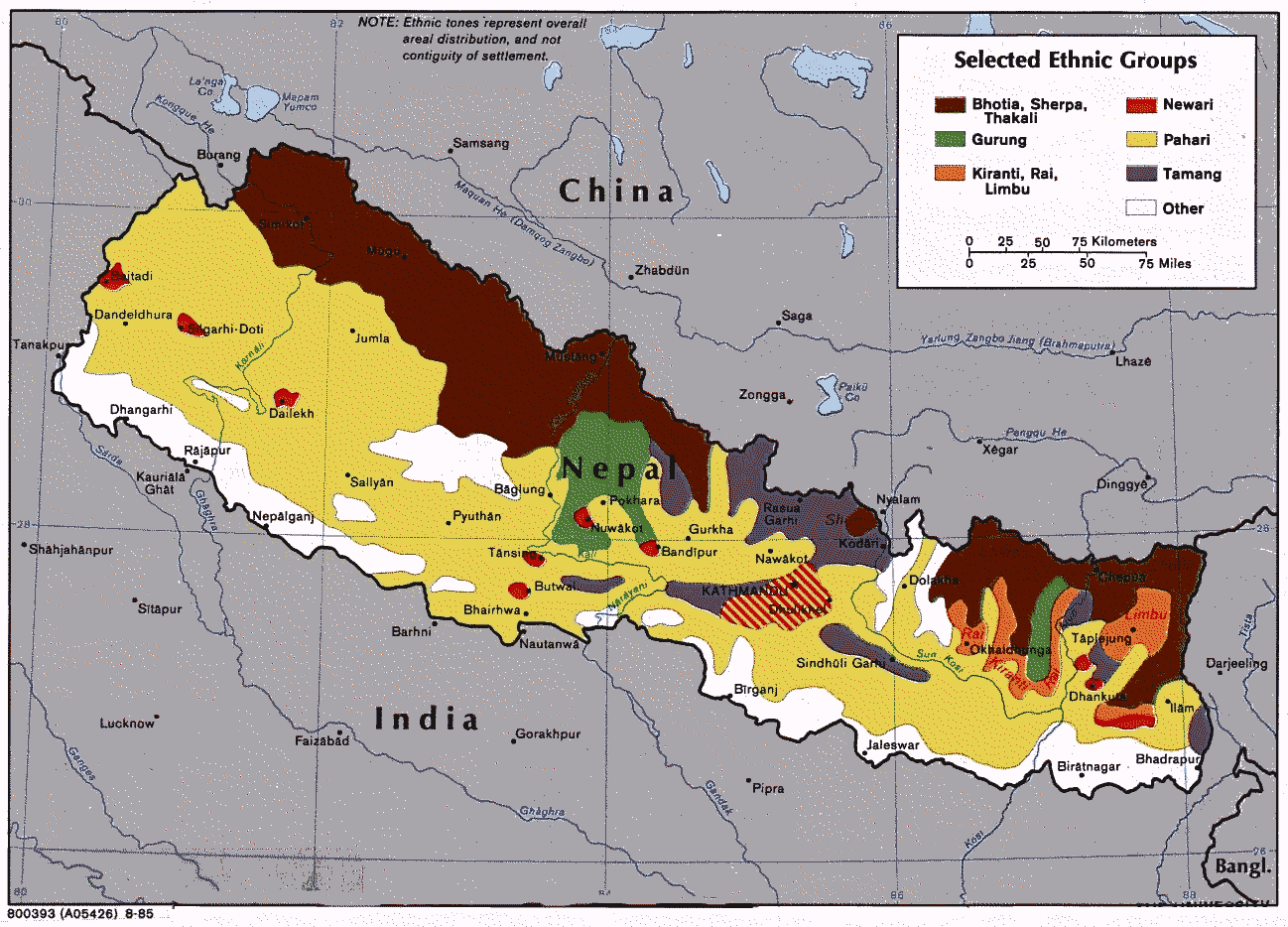
Selected ethnic groups of Nepal; Bhotia, Sherpa, Thakali, Gurung, Kiranti/Kirat (Rai, Sunuwar, Yakkha, Limbu), Newari, Pahari, Tamang

== Geographic distribution ==
The Central Bureau of Statistics of Nepal classifies the Thakali people as a subgroup within the broader social group of mountain/hill nationalities (janajāti). At the time of the 2011 Nepal census, 13,215 people (0.06% of the population of Nepal) were Thakali. The distribution of Thakali people by province was as follows:

- Gandaki Province (0.3%)
- Bagmati Province (0.1%)
- Karnali Province (0.0%)
- Koshi Province (0.0%)
- Lumbini Province (0.0%)
- Madhesh Province (0.0%)
- Sudurpashchim Province (0.0%)

The population of Thakali people was higher than national average (0.0%) in the following districts:

- Mustang (20.9%)
- Manang (0.9%)
- Myagdi (0.9%)
- Kaski (0.5%)
- Baglung (0.2%)
- Eastern Rukum (0.2%)
- Kathmandu (0.2%)
- Jumla (0.1%)
- Lalitpur (0.1%)
- Parbat (0.1%)
- Pyuthan (0.1%)
- Rupandehi (0.1%)

== See also ==
- Toran La, a festival of Thakali people
- Nepal
- Mustang District
- Dhaulagiri
