= List of Buddhist Monasteries and Temples in Nepal =

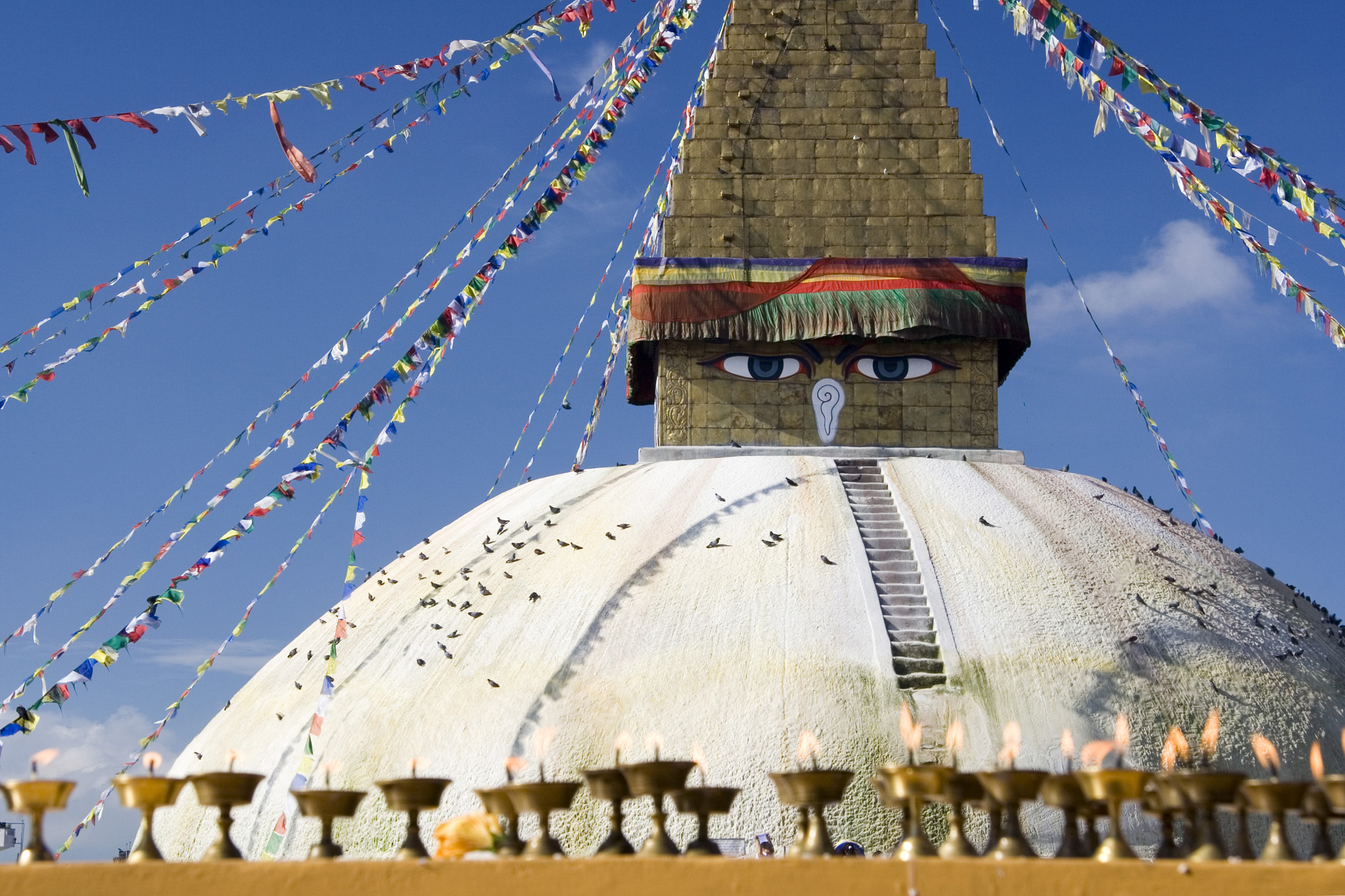
Boudhanath in Kathmandu, Nepal

This is a list of Buddhist temples, monasteries, stupas, and pagodas in Nepal for which there are Wikipedia articles, sorted by location.

== Kapilbastu District ==
- Tilaurakot, archeological site as the location for the historical site of Kapilavastu

== Kathmandu District ==
- Amitabha Monastery
- Benchen Monastery
- Boudhanath
- Ka-Nying Shedrub Ling
- Kindo Baha, also known as Kirttana Mahavihara (Theravadin)
- Kopan Monastery
- Pranidhipurna Mahavihar (Theravadin)
- Seto Gumba
- Swayambhunath
- Tergar Osel Ling Monastery
- Tharlam Monastery

== Lalitpur District ==
- Hiranya Varna Mahavihar, known locally as the "Golden Temple"

== Mustang District ==
- Chhairo gompa
- Muktinath
- Sambha gompa

== Rupandehi District ==
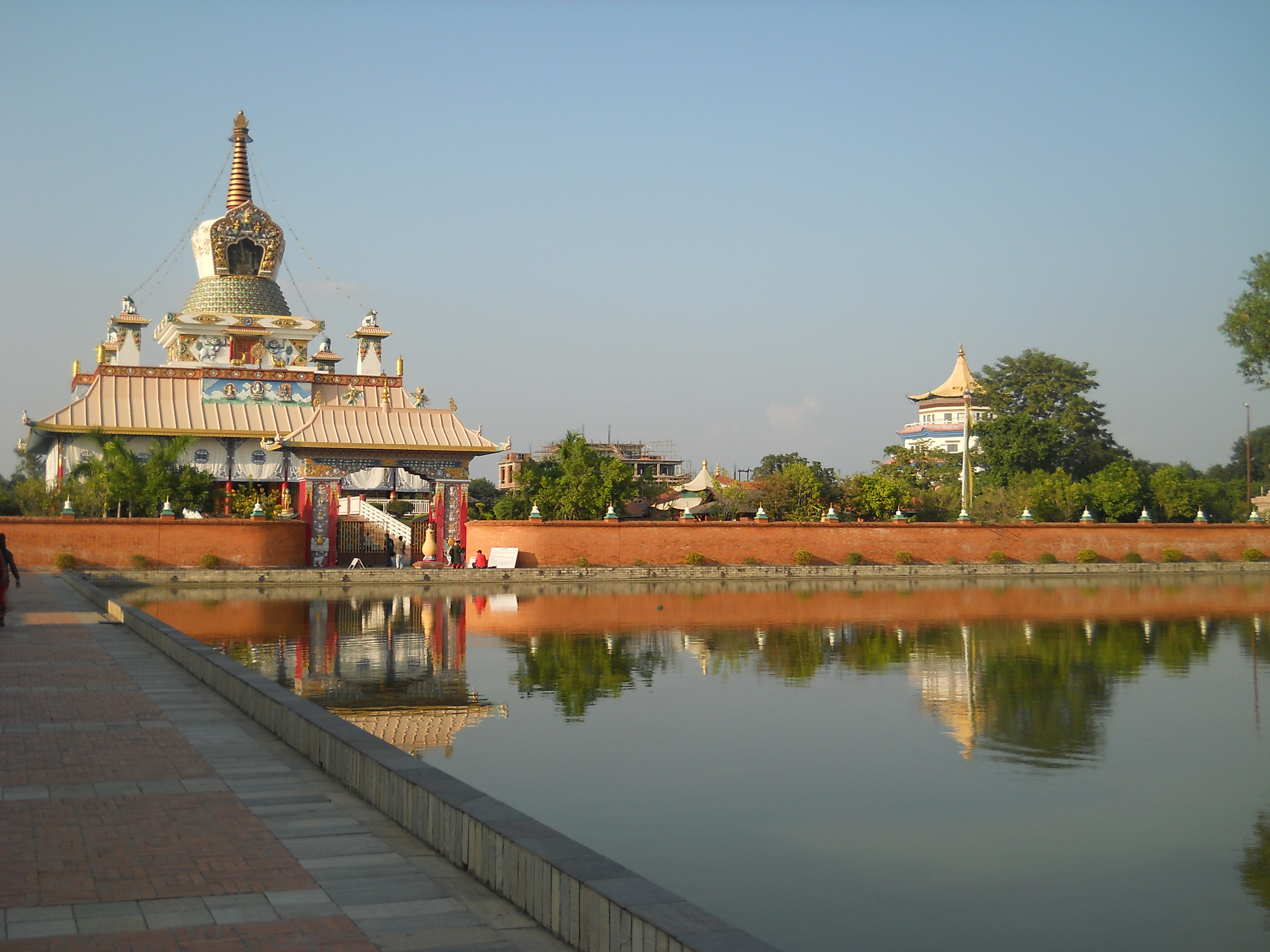
The Great Drigung Kagyud Lotus Stupa in Lumbini, Nepal

- Lumbini, birthplace of Gautama Buddha
- Maya Devi Temple, Lumbini

== Solukhumbu District ==
- Pema Namding Monastery
- Phugmoche Monastery
- Tengboche Monastery

== See also ==
- Buddhism in Nepal
- Buddhist pilgrimage sites in Nepal
- List of Buddhist temples
- List of Mahaviharas of Newar Buddhism
- List of monasteries in Nepal
- List of stupas in Nepal
