= List of religious buildings in Nepal =

This is a list of religious buildings in Nepal.

== List ==
- List of Buddhist temples in Nepal
- List of cathedrals in Nepal
- List of churches in Nepal
- List of monasteries in Nepal
- List of temples in Nepal
- List of stupas in Nepal
- List of mosques in Nepal
- List of synagogues in Nepal
