= List of monasteries in Nepal =

Buddhist monasteries in Nepal

This is a list of Buddhist monasteries in Nepal. They are also called Gumba or Gompa in the local language. Newars call it Bihars; see the List of Mahaviharas of Newar Buddhism. For list of buddhist stupas, see List of stupas in Nepal

Name	Location	Established	Photo	References
Karma Raja Maha Vihar	Swayambhunath			
Drigung Kagyu Rinchen Palri Monastery	chandragiri-12, Kathmandu	2007		Founded by H.E. Drubwang Sonam Jorphel Rinpoche
Pranidhipurna Mahavihar	Kathmandu		width	
Thrangu Tashi Yangtse Monastery	Kathmandu			
Pema Namding Monastery	Kathmandu			
Neydo Tashi Chöling Monastery	Kathmandu			
Shey Gompa	Dolpa	11th century AD		
Rinchenling monastery	Humla	10-11th century AD		
Narsingh monastery	Mustang		width	
Benchen Monastery	Kathmandu	1980s		
Chhairo gompa	Mustang	16th century AD	width	
Ka-Nying Shedrub Ling	Kathmandu	1972	width	
Kindo Baha	Kathmandu		width	
Kopan Monastery	Kathmandu	1969	width	
Seto Gumba	Kathmandu		width	
Namobuddha Monastery	Kathmandu		width	
Dongchu Monastery Monastery	Kathmandu			
Khawalung Monastery	Kathmandu			
Neydo Tashi Chöling Monastery	Dakshinkali, Kathmandu			
Pullahari Monastery	Kathmandu		width	
Indian Sanskritik Monastery	Lumbini			
Namkha Khyung Dzong Rigdin Choling Monastery	Budhanilkantha, Kathmandu			
Linh Son Monastery Lumbini Sanskritik	Lumbini			
Tengboche Monastery	Solukhumbu		width	
Tharlam Monastery	Kathmandu		width	
Phugmoche Monastery	Solukhumbu	1938	width	
Matepani Gumba	Pokhara	1938	width	
Thubchen Lhakang Monastery	Upper Mustang	15-16th century AD		
Jampa Lhakang Monastery	Upper Mustang	11-15 century AD	width	
Choede Monastery	Upper Mustang			
Charang Monastery	Upper Mustang		width	
Lo Ghekar Monastery	Upper Mustang			
Royal Thai Buddhist Monastery	Lumbini		width	
Nepal Vajrayana Mahavihara	Lumbini			
Cambodian Monastery	Lumbini			
Drubgon Jangchup Choeling Monastery	Thamel, Kathmandu		width	
Rigon Tashi Choeling Monastery	Pharping, Kathmandu			
Diki Chhyoling monastery	Taplejung			
Padma Chaitya Bihar	Butwal	1914	width	
