= Jigdal Dagchen Sakya =

Tibetan Buddhist teacher

His Holiness Jigdal Dagchen Sakya Rinpoche
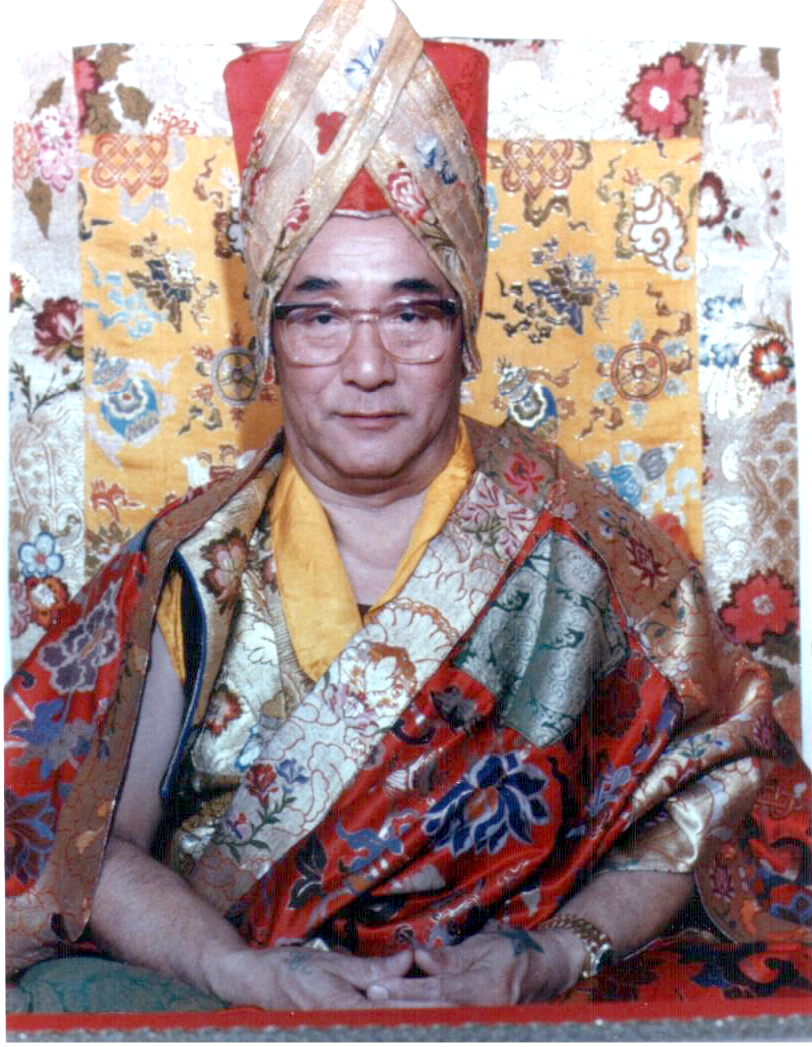
- Born: November 2, 1929; Sakya County, Tibet
- Died: April 29, 2016 (aged 86); Seattle, Washington, US
- Spouse: Dagmo Kushola Sonam Jamyang (m. 1950)
- Website: www.Sakya.org

Jigdal Dagchen Sakya Rinpoche (Tibetan: འཇིགས་བྲལ་བདག་ཆེན་ས་སྐྱ་རིན་པོ་ཆེ།, ZWPY: Jigchä Dagqên Sa'gya Rinboqê; alt. Jigchai Dagqên Sa'gya Rinboqê; November 2, 1929 – April 29, 2016) was a Tibetan Buddhist teacher educated in the Sakya sect. He was educated to be the head of the Sakya school of Tibetan Buddhism as well as the successor to the throne of Sakya, the third most important political position in Tibet in early times. Dagchen Rinpoche was in the twenty-sixth generation of the Sakya-Khön lineage descended from Khön Könchok Gyalpo and was regarded as an embodiment of Manjushri as well as the rebirth of a Sakya Lama from the Ngor sub-school, Ewam Luding Khenchen (The Great Abbot from the Luding family) Gyase Chökyi Nyima.

Dagchen is a title meaning “Lineage Holder.” Among his followers he was known as Dagchen Rinpoche, or simply as Rinpoche (“Precious One”). His formal title of “His Holiness” indicates the high degree of esteem with which the Tibetan Buddhist community holds him.

He immigrated in 1960 to the United States with his family, one of the first groups Tibetans-in-exile in North America. He is the first Head of the Sakya Order of Tibetan Buddhism to live in the United States. From the Sakya Monastery of Tibetan Buddhism in Seattle, Washington, and its precursor (which he co-founded in 1974), he taught and preserved Tibetan culture and religion. Because he was also a non-sectarian master within the Tibetan Buddhist tradition, he defined Sakya Monastery as a non-denominational and ecumenical center for teachings about Tibetan Buddhism. His work also included the foundation of Tibetan Buddhist communities overseas in India, Hong Kong, Taiwan, Nepal, Bhutan, and Southeast Asia, and teaching at Buddhist centers around the world.

== Life ==
=== Education and Early Adulthood ===
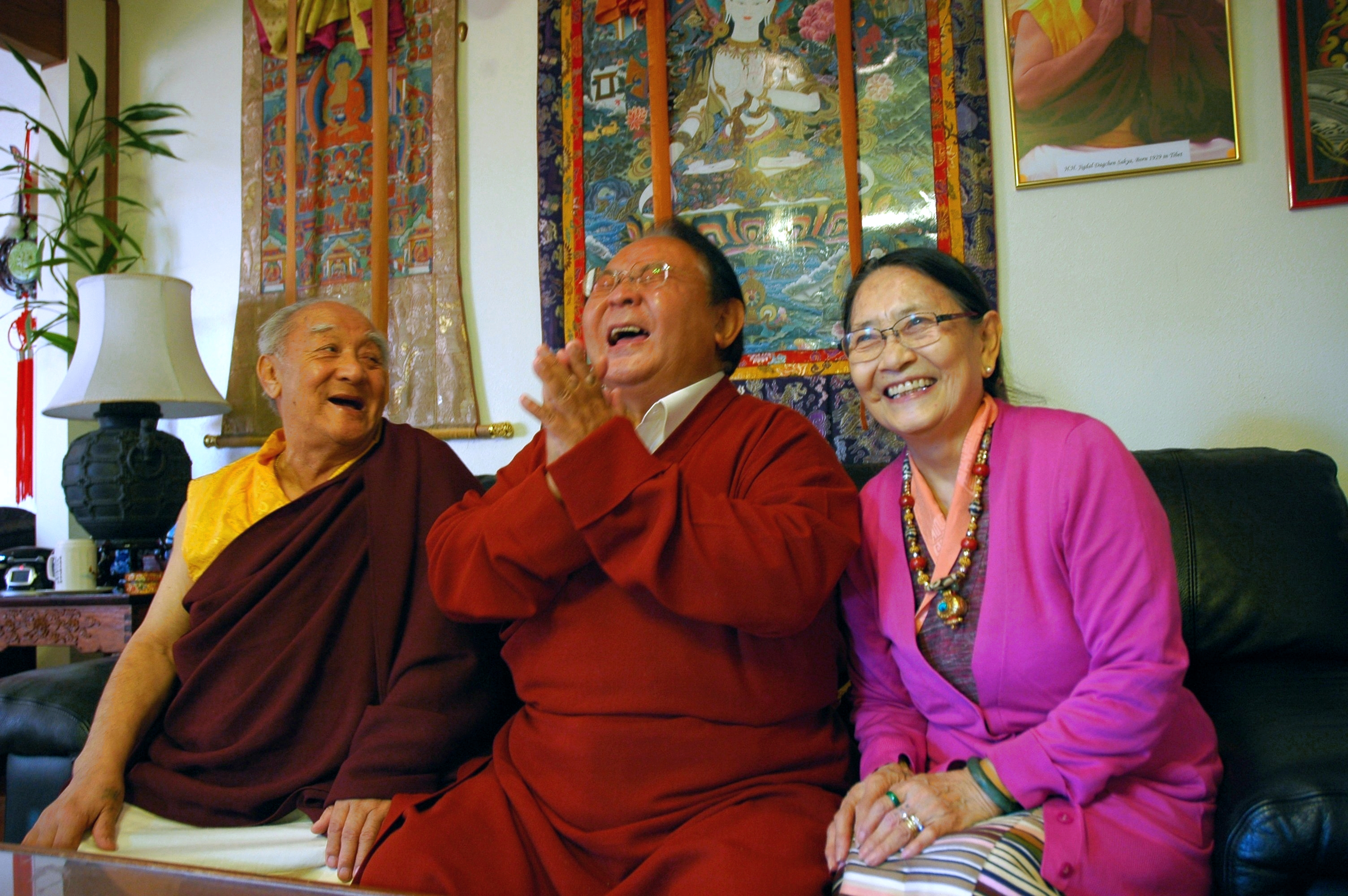
Jigdal Dagchen Sakya (L), Sogyal Rinpoche (Centre) and Dagmola Sakya (R), 2009

Dagchen Rinpoche was tutored by the abbot of the South Monastery of Sakya and by the Secretary of the Sakya Government. With these two teachers, Rinpoche studied the Tibetan alphabet, composition, classical literature, philosophy, and the Four Classes of Tantra (esoteric Buddhism). He also received teachings on the Sakya meditation deities. From Pönlop Sakya of the North Monastery, Dagchen Rinpoche learned the fundamental esoteric religious rites of the Sakya tradition: religious music, mandala offering, dancing, and ritual hand gestures.

After having successfully completed this training, Dagchen Rinpoche received from his father the Sakya-Khon lineage transmission of Vajrakilaya (a meditational deity whose name means the “Dagger of Indestructible Reality”), and the complete Lamdré Tsokshey (The Path and Its Fruit in its more esoteric form), which is the main teaching of the Sakya tradition. Thus, Rinpoche's primary spiritual teacher was his father, Trichen Ngawang Thutop Wangchuk.

In 1950, at age 21, Dagchen Rinpoche married Sönam Tsezom, who descends from a family of lamas and doctors of East Tibet (Kham). She is the niece of the Dezhung Rinpoche III. When she married her name became Jamyang and her title Dagmo Kusho or, more formally, Dagmo Kushola, which roughly translates as: "mother of a prince."

Later that year Dagchen Rinpoche's father died. Rinpoche became the interim Throne-holder. Concurrently, Communist Chinese invaders were threatening Tibet and Tibetan Buddhism. After a short reign as the head of the Sakya sect, he took a leave of absence as ruler of Sakya in order to travel to East Tibet to complete his religious education.

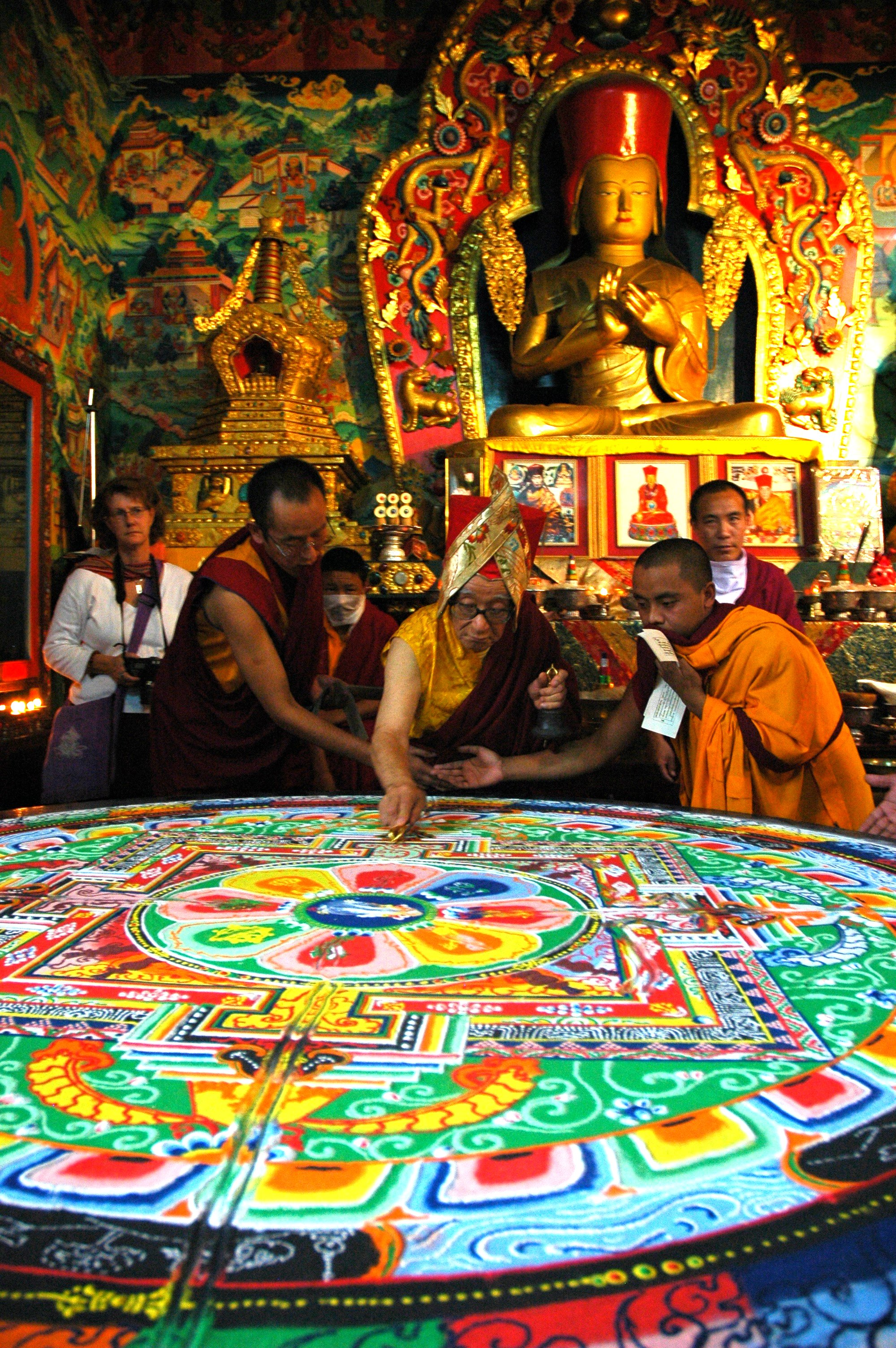
Dagchen Rinpoche closes the Hevajra Mandala of colored sand using a gold dorje below a statue of Sakya Pandita

In East Tibet, Dagchen Rinpoche received teachings from fourteen lamas. Among them were his root lamas, Jamyang Chökyi Lodrö and Dilgo Khyentse Rinpoche. They were renowned non-sectarian lamas, of the Sakya and Nyingma traditions, respectively. From Jamyang Chökyi Lodrö Rinpoche, Dagchen Rinpoche received initiations and teachings of the Sakya School's most valued teaching, the seven-volume Lamdré Lopshey (The Path and Its Fruit in its more esoteric form) and the fourteen-volume Druptap Kundu (Collection of Methods of Realization). From Dilgo Khyentse Rinpoche, Dagchen Rinpoche received teachings on the thirteen-volume Damngak Dzö (Treasury of Esoteric Instructions), a non-sectarian compilation by Jamgön Kongtrul, a great non-sectarian master of Tibetan Buddhism from the Kagyu School. Additionally, twelve other Sakya lamas gave him the teachings from the thirty-one volume Gyude Kundu.

=== Emigration to the United States ===
In 1959, due to the Communist Chinese invasion of Tibet, Dagchen Rinpoche and his family (including his younger brother Ngawang Trinly Tashi Pal Sakyapa and his wife's uncle Dezhung Rinpoche III) fled to Bhutan and then to India. Professor Turrell V. Wylie from the Tibetan Studies Program at the University of Washington, the first such program in the country, invited Dagchen Rinpoche to participate in a research project on Tibet sponsored by the Rockefeller Foundation. This enabled Dagchen Rinpoche to bring his family to Seattle, Washington in 1960. The research project funding lasted for three years. Following that, over the next decade Rinpoche held several positions at the University of Washington, including working in the Anthropology Department and at the Burke Museum of Natural History and Culture.

=== A Non-Sectarian Seattle Lama ===
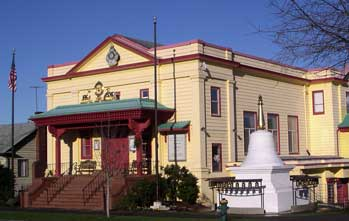
Sakya Monastery of Tibetan Buddhism, Seattle

In 1974 Dagchen Rinpoche co-founded, with Dezhung Rinpoche III, his wife's uncle, the original Sakya Dharma Center in Seattle called Sakya Tegchen Choling. In 1984, the group adopted the name of Sakya Monastery of Tibetan Buddhism.

For the purpose of the preservation of Tibetan culture and religion, Dagchen Rinpoche oversaw the religious activities and administration of the Monastery from its inception. His spiritual leadership took various forms: leading meditations, giving teachings and empowerments (spiritual initiations), conducting refuge ceremonies in which people formally become Buddhists, and holding special services upon request. When the Monastery was completed, Dagchen Rinpoche placed greater emphasis on education. The Virupa Educational Institute is devoted to the study of Tibetan Buddhism, Buddhism in general, religions, cultures, and sciences from around the world. Non-sectarianism and education were major components of Rinpoche's teaching, in keeping with the beliefs of his root lamas. Sakya Monastery in Seattle has hosted visits from leading lamas of the four schools of Tibetan Buddhism, including the Dalai Lama. Dagchen Rinpoche's interest in ecumenism stemmed from his training as a non-sectarian master, and from his experience as an immigrant who went to the United States seeking religious freedom. Like the Fourteenth Dalai Lama, Rinpoche encouraged inter-religious and interdisciplinary meetings and encounters for Tibetan Buddhists. He regularly travelled to teach in Asia, Europe, Canada, and throughout the United States.

== Ancestry ==
=== Ancestors ===
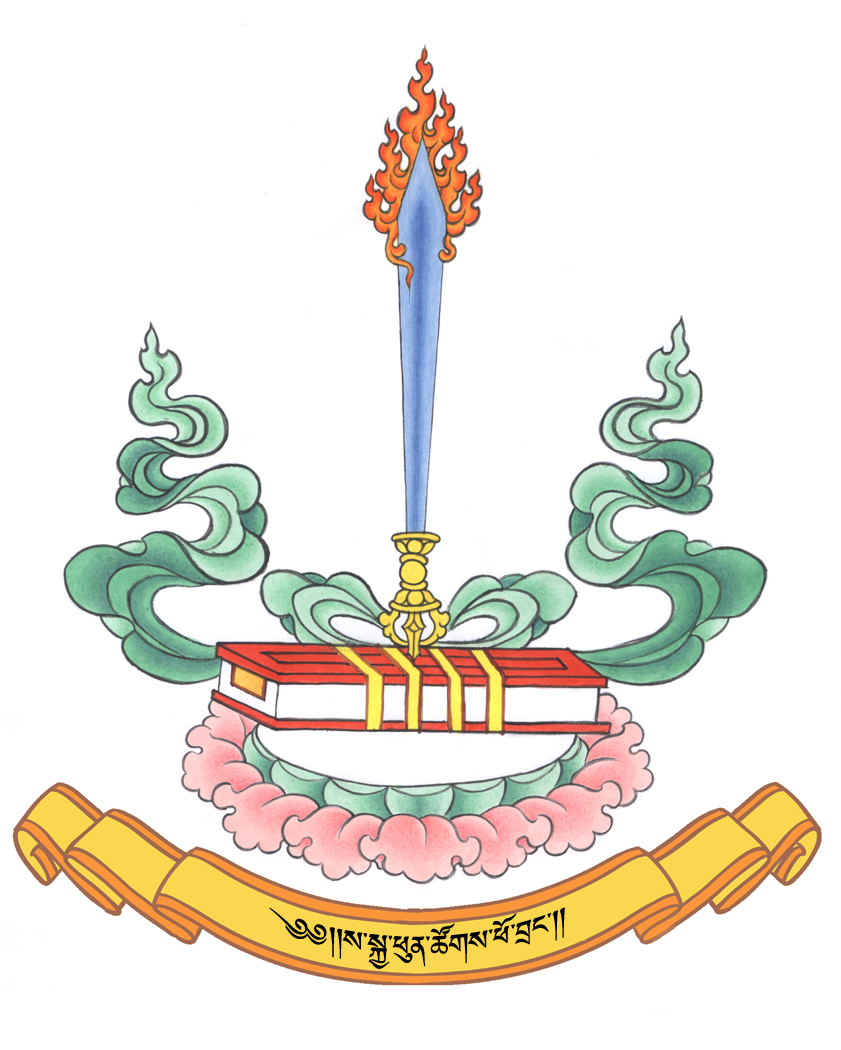
Phuntsok Phodrang Family Seal

Lineage is important in the Tibetan Buddhist tradition, and Dagchen Rinpoche's lineage is revered. It extends more than thousand years. His father was Trichen (“Great Throne-holder”) Ngawang Thutop Wangchuk, the last great throne-holder of the Sakya Order of Tibetan Buddhism in Tibet, and his mother was Gyalyum (“Mother of the Khön Children”) Dechen Drolma.

Dagchen Rinpoche's family lineage is considered divine because family records and Tibetan histories state that his family is descended from celestial beings from the realm of heavenly clear light. Five generations of these celestial beings are said to have lived in Tibet. A famous ancestor of his from the late eighth century was Khön Lu’i Wangpo (Nagendrarakshita), one of the first seven Tibetans ordained as a Buddhist monk, a noted translator, and a personal disciple of Padmasambhava (who erected the first Buddhist monastery in Tibet, called Samye). Since the eleventh century, the Sakya male progeny are also regarded as emanations of Manjushri, the Bodhisattva of Wisdom; Avalokiteshvara Bodhisattva of Compassion; or Vajrapani, Bodhisattva of Power.

=== The Sakya Name ===
In 1042, Atisha, the great Indian Buddhist master who helped revive Buddhism in Tibet, was traveling in Tibet spreading the Buddha's teachings. At the side of a mountain where there was “pale earth,” he foresaw the emanations of three bodhisattvas who he knew would spread the Buddhist doctrine in Tibet: Avalokiteshvara (the embodiment of compassion), Manjushri (the embodiment of infinite wisdom), and Vajrapani (the embodiment of infinite power).

It was at the same site of pale earth some thirty years later, in 1073, that Khön Könchok Gyalpo (1034–1102), ancestor of Dagchen Rinpoche, built the first Sakya Monastery. The monastery took its name from the pale earth (in Tibetan “sa-kya”) where the monastery was founded. Subsequently, the town that arose there, the family of the monastery's founder (the Khön lineage), and the school of Tibetan Buddhism took the name of the monastery: Sakya. The Sakya name is also renowned for having lamas as rulers of Tibet. The Sakya patriarch, Chogyal Pakpa (1235–1280) was given temporal authority over Tibet through the patronage of the Mongol rulers of China. Subsequently, the Sakya lamas governed Tibet for over ninety years. The Sakya School is one of the four great Schools of Tibetan Buddhism. The Sakya masters developed a tradition that emphasized study and meditation in equal measure.
