= Thubchen Lhakang Monastery =

Buddhist monastery

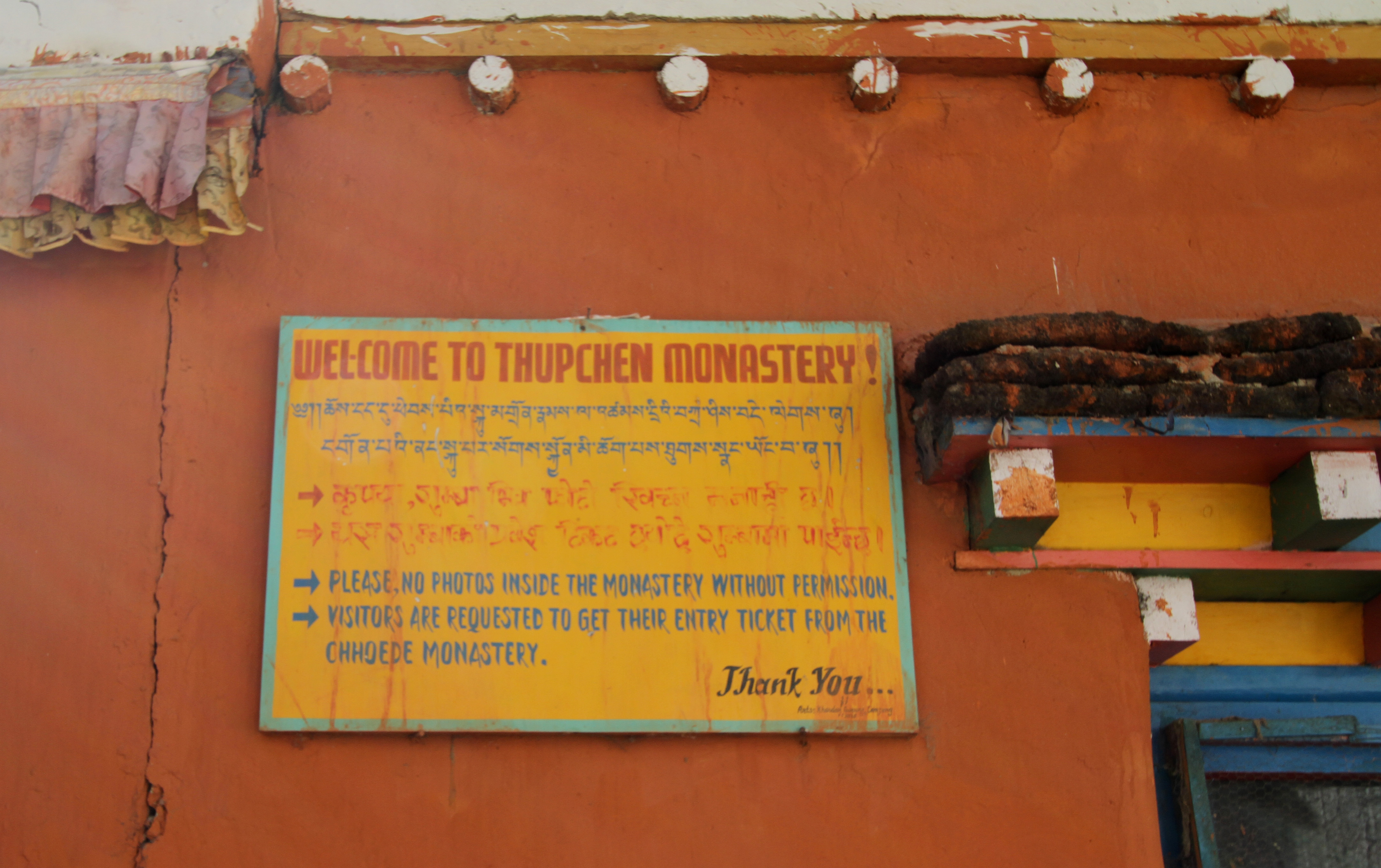
- Thubchen Lhakhang Monastery's Gate, 3 October 2015

Religion
- Affiliation: Tibetan Buddhism

Location
- Location: Mustang, Nepal

Thubchen Lhakang Monastery (Nepali: थुबचेन गुम्बा, Thubchen Gumba or Gompa) is a 15th-century Buddhist monastery located in Lo Manthang, Upper Mustang, Nepal. The monastery has ancient wall paintings drawn with hues of turquoise, malachite, cinnamon and gold. These walls were damaged but restored later by King Mahendra Trust for Nature Conservation and American Himalayan Foundation in 1999.

== Structure ==
The monastery is constructed with stone, clay and wood. The main structure is 37.20m long, 24m wide and 12m high. The entrance door is carved with six lion heads and scriptures in Ranjana script. Next to the entrance lies earthen statues of Dhvajarāja (Vaisravana) and Vinaraja in the north and Khadgaraja and Chaityaraja in the south. The main hall is supported by 35 wooden (originally 42 pillars). The central ceiling embeds a skylight bounded by a square of 36 lion heads. The northern wall was restored in 1815 by Padma Bhuti. The structure has survived many earthquakes.

== Mural Paintings ==
The eastern wall of the hall images featuring posture of Buddha and various small Buddhas around him and the Vairocana Buddha in the gesture setting the Dharmachakra in motion. There are eight paintings of the Buddha on the southern wall and one on the western wall. These paintings date back to the 15th century AD. The paintings on the northern wall were restored in the 19th century. The paintings are as big as 7m tall and 3.40m wide.

== Repair of 1998 ==
In 1998 the monastery was repaired through Thubchen Gonpa Conservation Project. The whole roof was completely repaired. The damaged parts were replaced and covered over again with stone and mud. The skylight in the roof was modified such that the light which entered through the top now enters from the south. The damaged painting was also restored. These repairs were criticized by the local people.

== Gallery ==
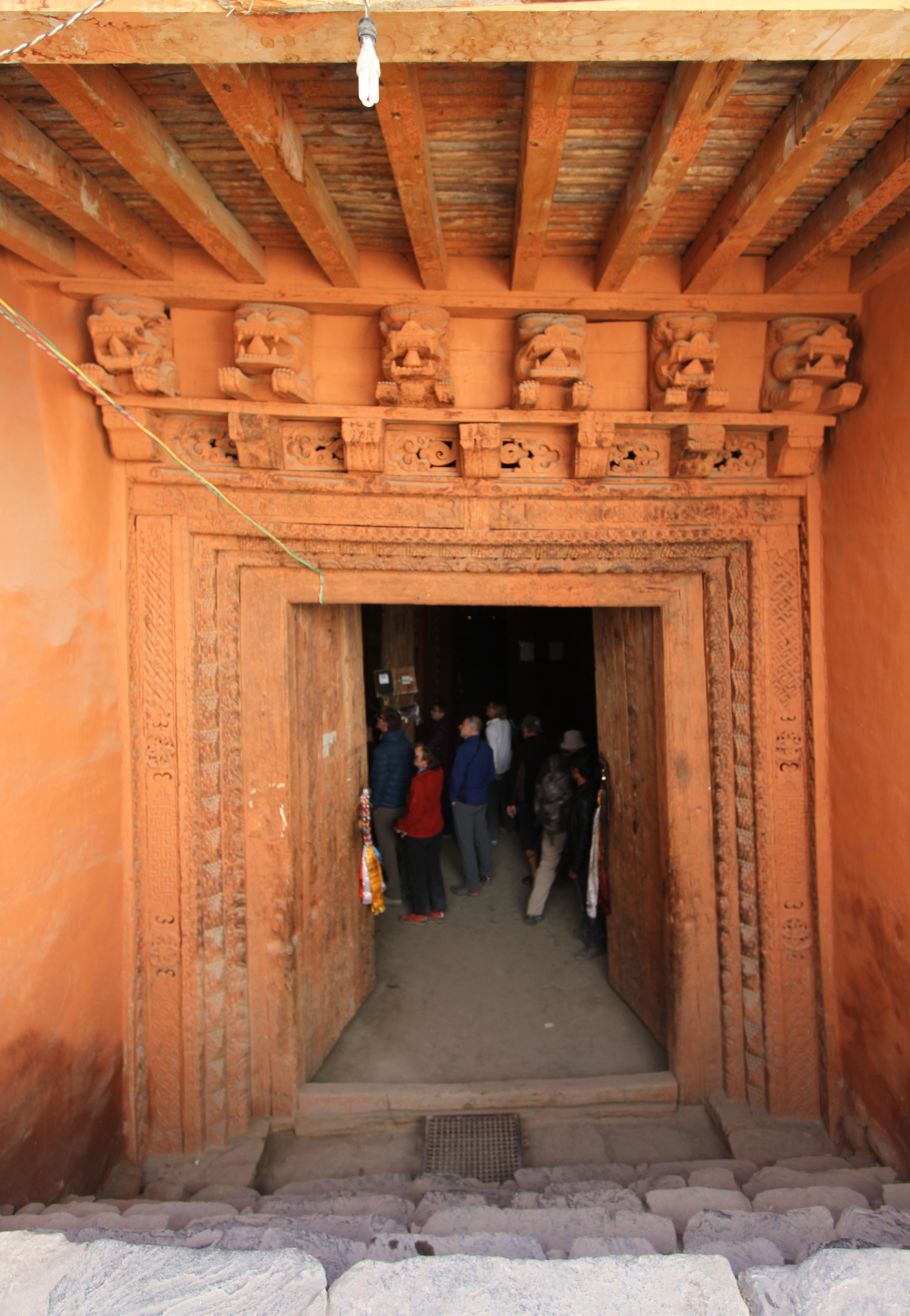
Inside Thubchen Lhakhang Monastery, 3 October 2015

== See also ==
- List of monastery in Nepal

== Notes ==
- Yang, Xinhui; Ji, Xinyan; Cao, Yongkang; Yu, Taoyi (2019-06-20). "Studies on wall painting materials and techniques at two historic buildings in Gyantse, Tibet". Heritage Science. 7 (1): 40. doi:10.1186/s40494-019-0282-x. ISSN 2050-7445.
