= Turrell V. Wylie =

American scholar, Tibetologist, and sinologist

Terry Wylie
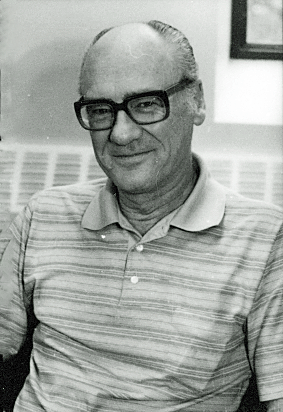
- Wylie at the University of Washington (c. 1975)
- Born: Turrell Verl Wylie; August 20, 1927; Durango, Colorado, United States
- Died: August 25, 1984 (aged 57); Seattle, Washington, United States
- Education: University of Washington (BA, PhD)
- Known for: Tibetan studies

Turrell Verl "Terry" Wylie (August 20, 1927 – August 25, 1984) was an American scholar, Tibetologist, sinologist and professor known as one of the 20th century's leading scholars of Tibet. He taught as a professor of Tibetan Studies at the University of Washington and served as the first chair of the Department of Asian Languages and Literature. Wylie founded the Tibetan Studies program at the University of Washington, the first of its kind in the United States, setting a major precedent for future programs and research in the field. His system for rendering the Tibetan language in Latin script, known as Wylie transliteration, is the primary system used for transcribing Tibetan in academic and historical contexts.

== Life and career ==
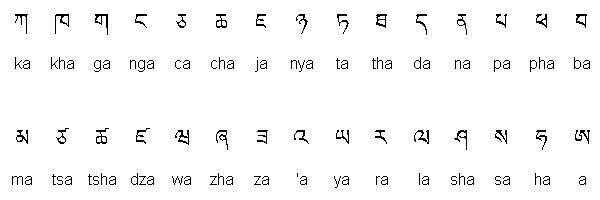
Wylie transliteration of Tibetan script

Turrell V. "Terry" Wylie was born in Durango, Colorado on August 20, 1927. He attended the University of Washington as an undergraduate student, where he graduated with a B.A. degree. Wylie continued on at Washington as a graduate student, receiving a Ph.D. in Chinese in 1958 with a dissertation entitled "The Geography of Tibet According to the 'Dzam-gling-rgyas-bshad". Wylie also studied under Giuseppe Tucci, an early pioneer of Buddhist studies in the West, and he was one of very few American scholars in the field whose education "combined solid linguistic preparation with a rigorous command of text-oriented philological discipline."

Wylie is best known for the system of Tibetan transliteration described in his groundbreaking article "A Standard System of Tibetan Transcription", which was published in 1959 in the Harvard Journal of Asiatic Studies. Today, it is an almost universally adopted scheme for accurately representing the orthography of Tibetan in the Latin script, and is commonly referred to as the Wylie transliteration.

Following the People's Liberation Army's takeover of Tibet, Wylie invited the first group of Tibetan refugees to Seattle in 1960, courtesy of the Rockefeller Foundation. Among them included Geshe Nawang L. Nornang, a renowned lecturer of Tibetan language at the University of Washington who subsequently worked with Wylie to establish the first Tibetan Studies program in America under the National Defense Education Act, and Lhadon Karsip, co-contributor with Geshe Nornang to A Manual of Spoken Tibetan (1964). Also in the group were Sakya Dagchen Rinpoche, a hierarch of the Sakya school of Tibetan Buddhism, and Dezhung Rinpoche, co-founder of the Sakya Dharma Center in Seattle.

Wylie died on August 25, 1984. Upon his death, the 14th Dalai Lama remarked: "Dr. Wylie's strong and genuine feelings for the Tibetan people and their just cause will long remain deeply appreciated. In the death of Dr. Wylie we have lost a true friend and a distinguished scholar of Tibetan studies."

At the memorial service on 9 October 1984, Jigmie Yuthok speaking on behalf of the Seattle Tibetan Community said, "As a scholar in the truest sense of the word, whose life-long research in the histories of Tibet and China led him to discern fact from fiction, he stood up for the truth of Tibet's independent status and spoke out at every opportunity even in the face of overwhelming opposition from numerous vested interest groups. He was not the one to compromise anything for the Truth. To the Tibetans here in particular, he was a great teacher, a mentor, a patron, and an affectionate brother whose kindness and generosity had nurtured the first batch of Tibetans that he brought to Seattle in 1960 to grow into a thriving little community it is today."

== Publications (selection) ==
=== Books ===
- (1950) A Tibetan religious geography of Nepal (Serie Orientale Roma XLII), Rome, Istituto per il Medio ed Estremo Oriente
- (1957) A Place Name Index to George N. Roerich's translation of the Blue Annals (Serie Orientale Roma XV), Rome, Istituto per il Medio ed Estremo Oriente
- (1975) Tibet’s role in Inner Asia. Bloomington, Ind., Indiana University, Asian Studies Research Institute

=== Articles ===
- (1959) A Standard System of Tibetan Transcription. Harvard Journal of Asiatic Studies (Vol. 22) p. 261-267
- (1959) Dating the Tibetan Geography 'Dzam-gling-rgyas-bshad' through its description of the western hemisphere. Central Asiatic Journal (vol. IV-4), p. 300-311
- (1964) Ro-Langs: The Tibetan Zombie. History of Religions, Vol. 4, No. 1 (Summer, 1964), pp. 69–80
- (1965) The Tibetan Tradition of Geography. Bulletin of Tibetology, Summer, 1964 p. 69-80
- (1982) Dating the Death of Naropa. Indological and Buddhist Studies (Editor L. Hercus, Canberra), pp. 687–91
