= Diki Chhyoling monastery =

Monastery in Taplejung, Nepal

- Location within Nepal

Religion
- Affiliation: Tibetan Buddhism

Location
- Location: Taplejung, Nepal
- Interactive map of Diki Chhyoling monastery
- Coordinates: 27.639°N 87.755°E

Diki Chhyoling Gumba (Nepali: दिकि छ्योलिङ्ग गुम्बा) is a Buddhist monastery located in Olangchungola, Taplejung District of Nepal. It was built in the 16th century CE. The monastery houses a life size statue of Avalokiteshwara. A butter lamp kept near the altar is believed to be burning uninterrupted since the construction of the gompa. The monastery also houses historical and cultural scriptures, idols, paintings related to Buddhism. The monastery was renovated in 1860.

== See also ==
- List of monastery in Nepal
