= Narsingh monastery =

Buddhist monastery in Nepal

Narsingh monastery (नरसिंह गुम्बा)
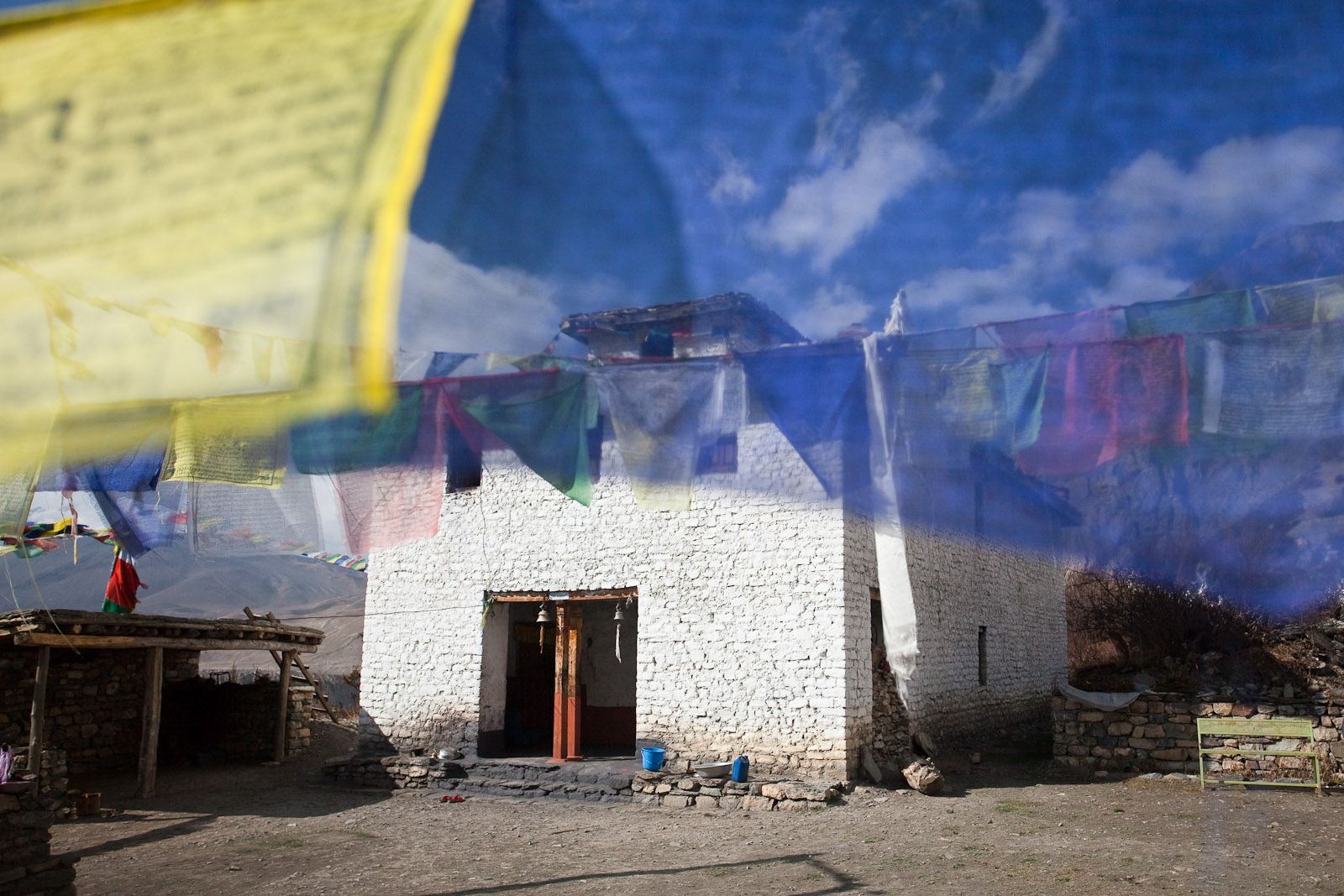

- Location within Nepal

Religion
- Affiliation: Tibetan Buddhism

Location
- Location: Mustang, Nepal
- Interactive map of Narsingh monastery (नरसिंह गुम्बा)
- Coordinates: 28°49′0″N 83°52′15″E 28°49′0″N 83°52′15″E

Narsingh monastery (Nepali: नरसिंह गुम्बा, Narsingh Gumba or Gompa) is a Buddhist monastery located in the rural Baragung Muktichhetra municipality of Mustang District in Nepal. It is situated in the northern side of the Muktinath temple. It was constructed in the 6th century AD. The local Buddhists call it the "Temple of 1,000 Lamps" (Mharme Lha Khang Gompa).

The monastery has a statue of Guru Padmasambhava (Guru Rinpoche) and his friends Tibetan tantric deities Drag Po on the right and Seng Dong on the left. Hindus also worship in this monastery, considering the deity of this monastery to be the Narasimha avatar of Vishnu (a humanoid lion).

The monastery is constructed of stone and mud masonry. Due to water leakage, it was renovated in 2018 at a cost of रू 28,500,000.

== See also ==
- List of monasteries in Nepal

== Notes ==
- Vallangi, Neelima. "Climate change threatens 1,000-year-old monastery in remote Nepal".
