= Jampa Lhakang Monastery =

Monastery in Nepal

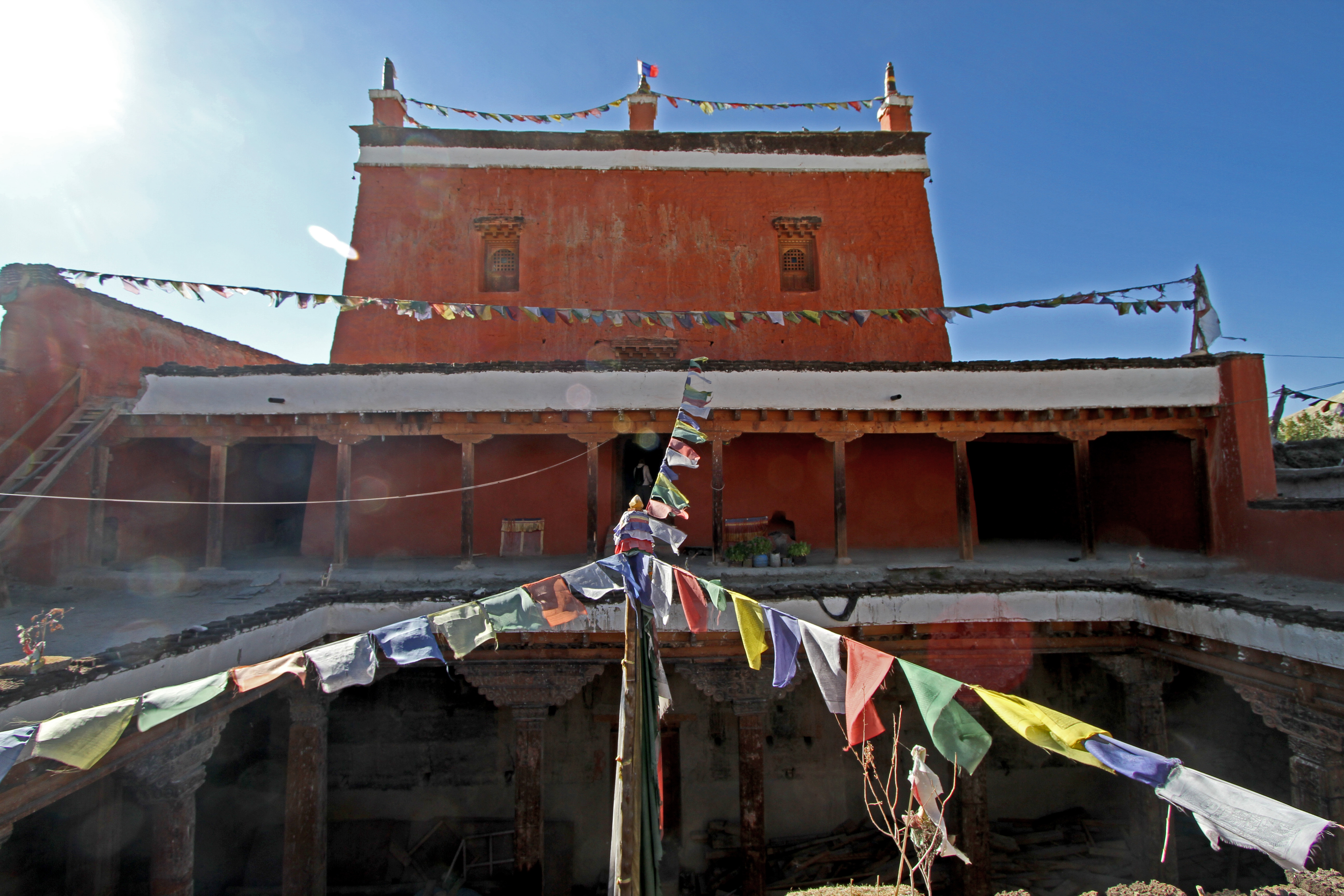

Religion
- Affiliation: Tibetan Buddhism

Location
- Location: Upper Mustang, Nepal

Jampa Lhakang Monastery (Nepali: जाम्पा लाकान्ग गुम्बा, Thubchen Gumba or Gompa), also called Maitreya Temple, is a Buddhist monastery located in Lo Manthang, Upper Mustang in Nepal. It was thought to be built in the 11th century AD but later verified to be built in the 15th century AD and contains the world's largest collection of mandalas painted on its walls. The earthquake of April 2015 severely damaged these paintings and 500-year-old frescos of the floors. The American Himalayan Foundation and Lo Gyalpo Jigme Cultural Conservation Foundation are helping to recover these damages.

== Gallery ==
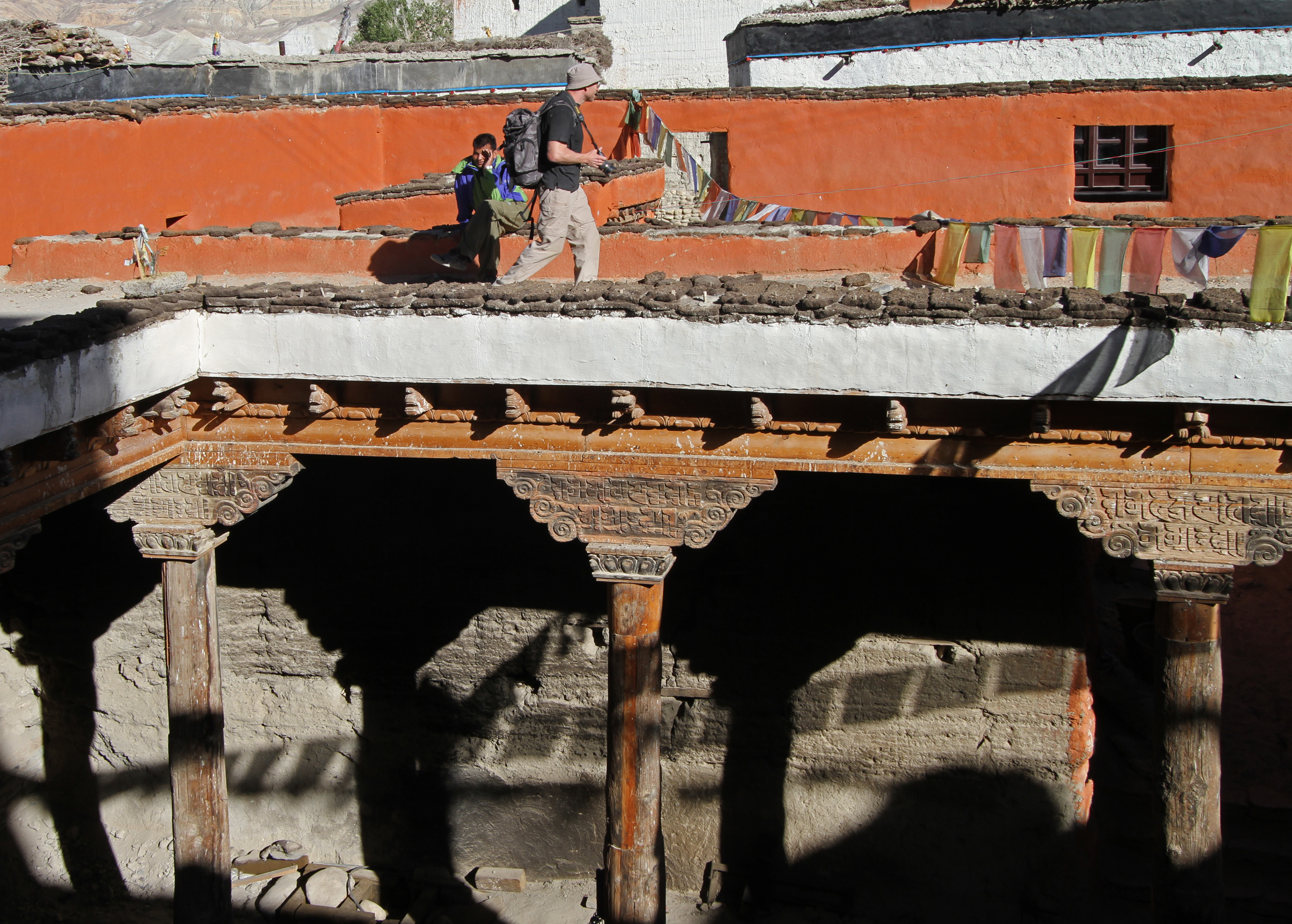

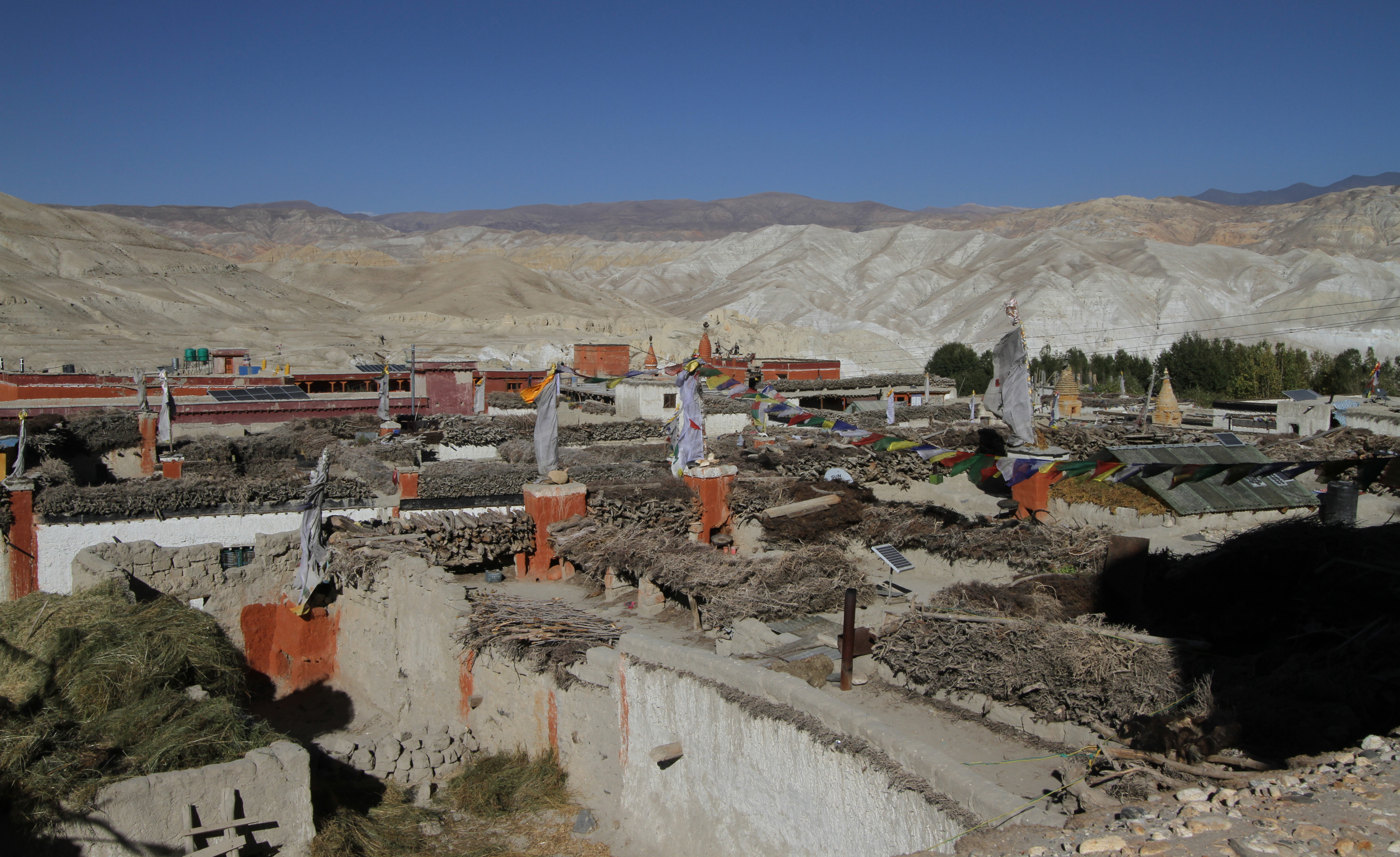

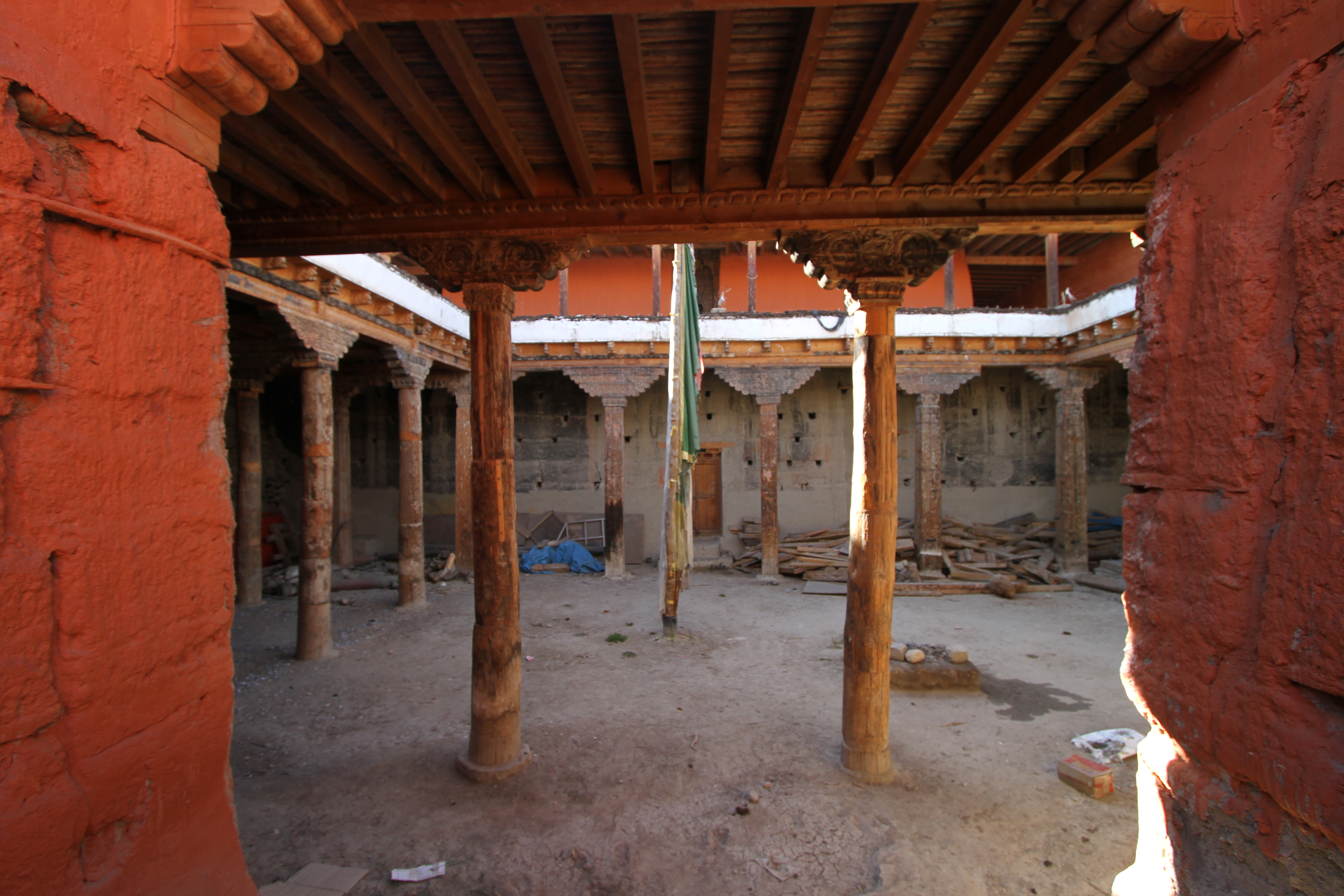

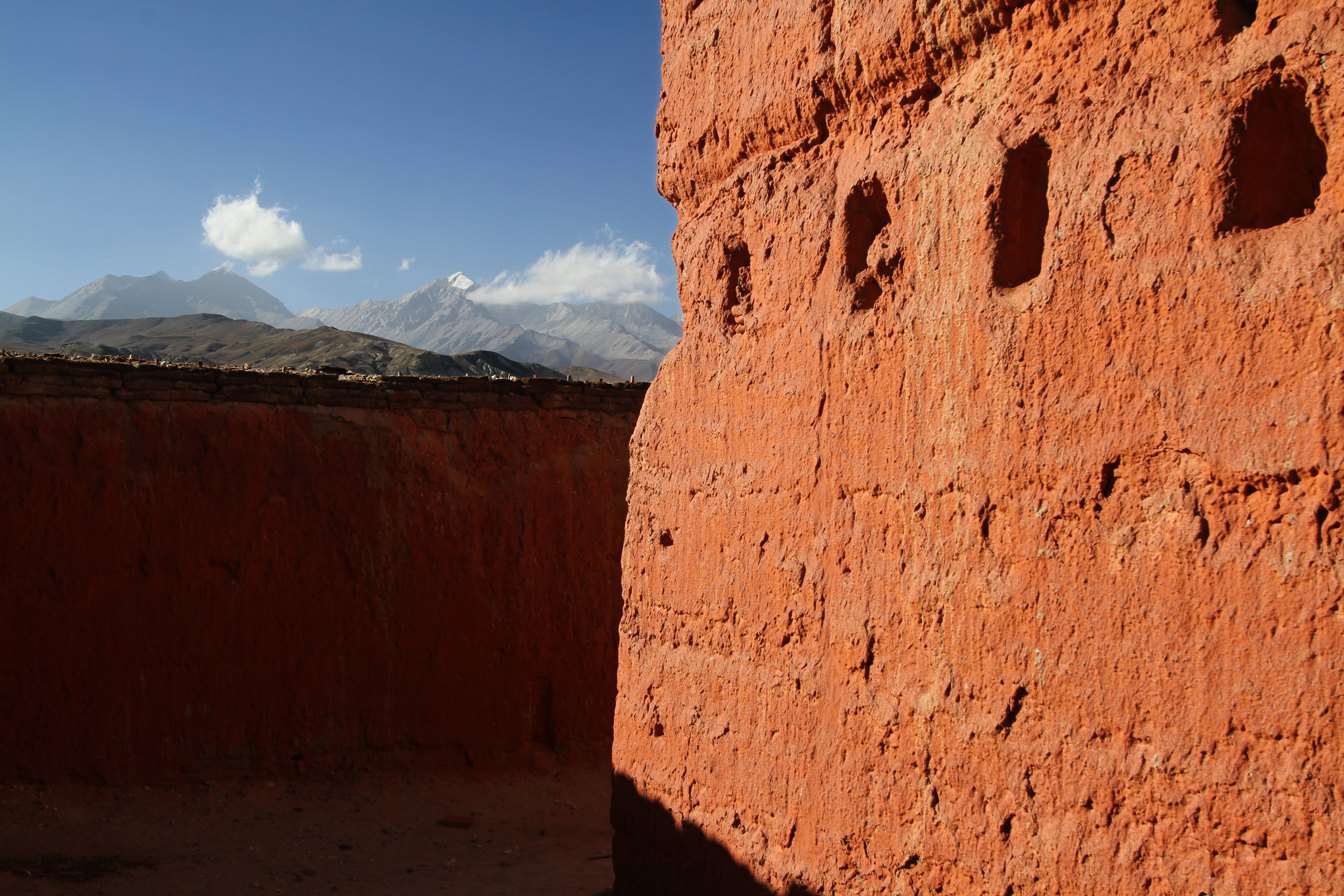

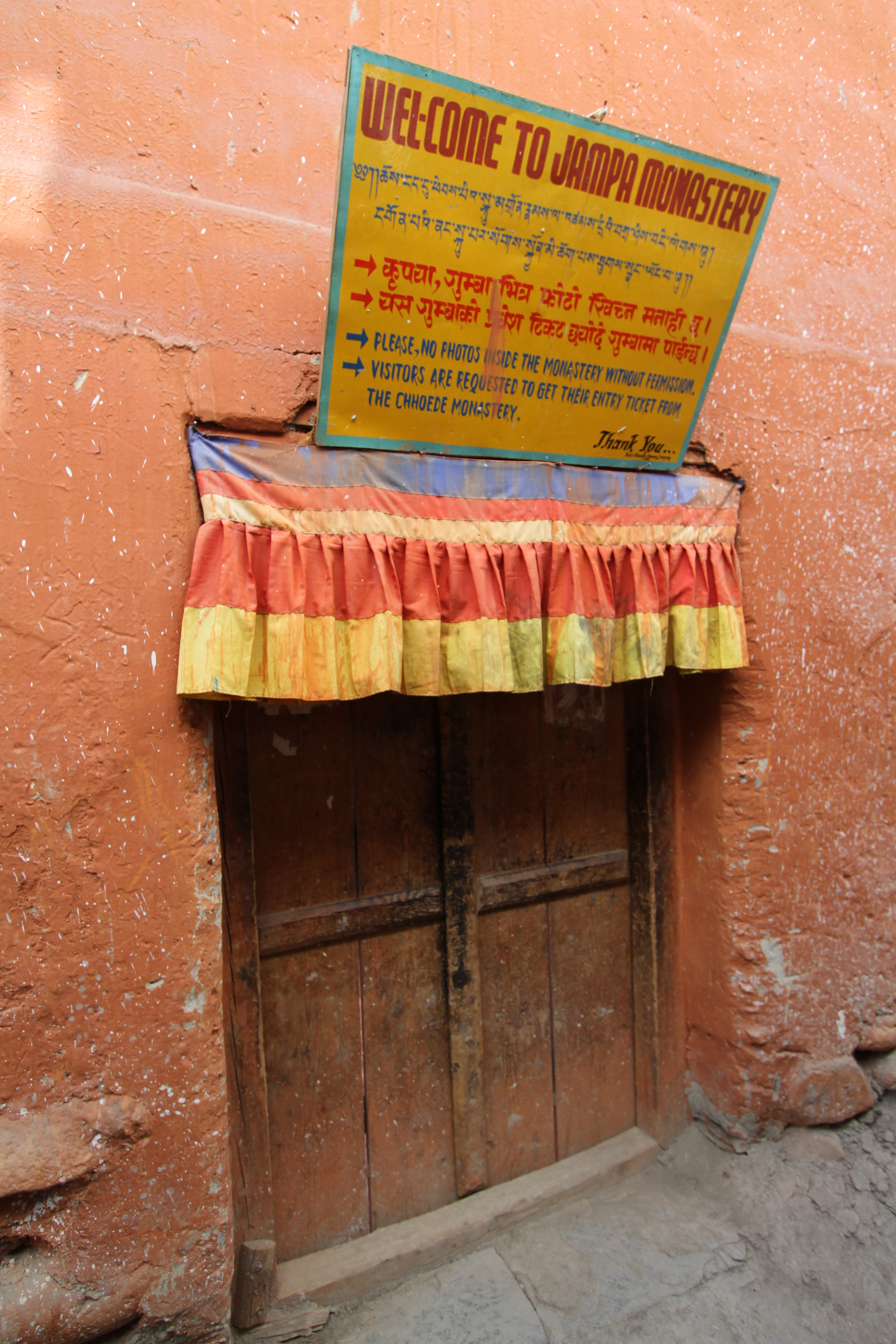
Main Entrance

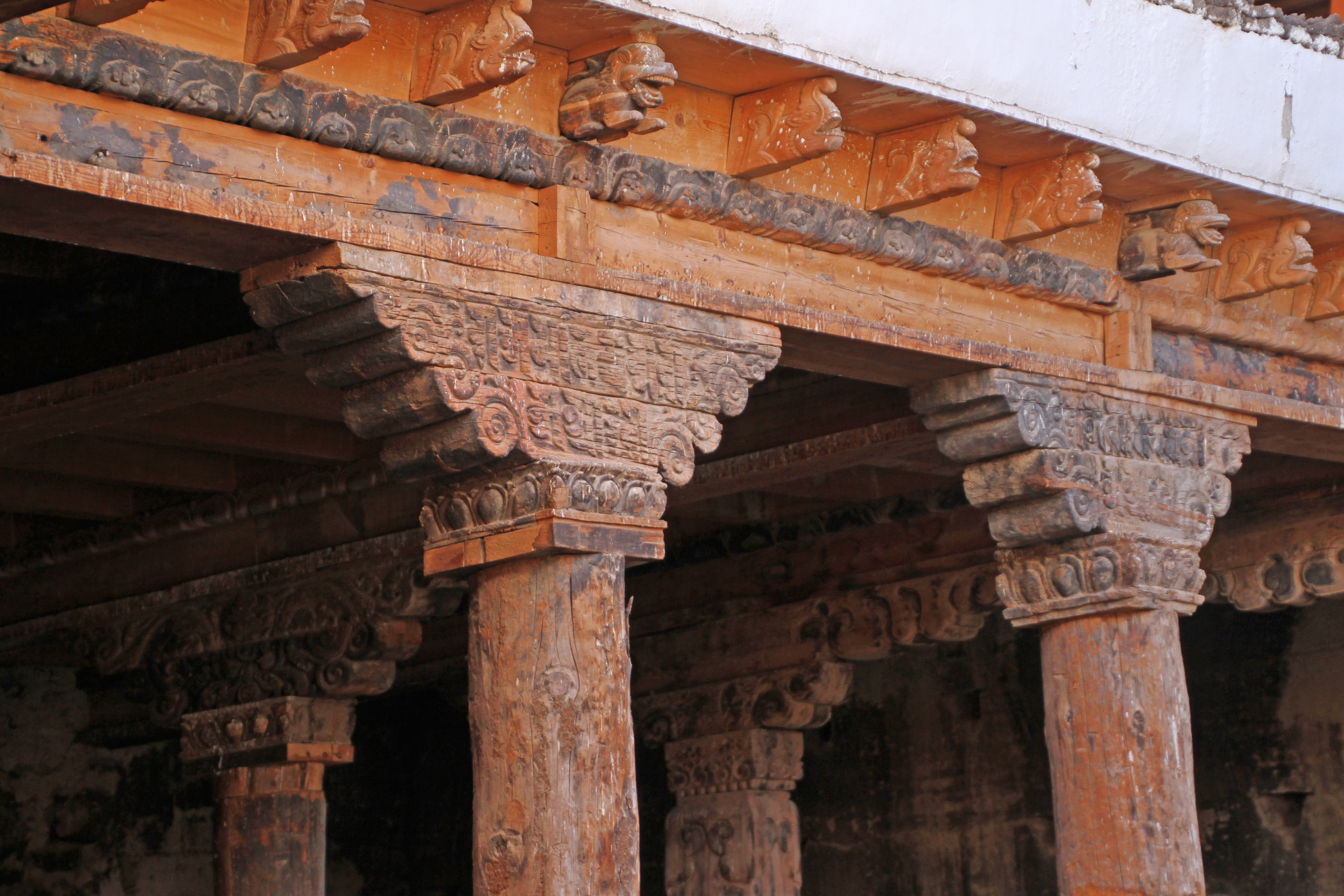

== See also ==
- List of monasteries in Nepal
