= Dezhung Rinpoche =

Tibetan lama of the Sakya school

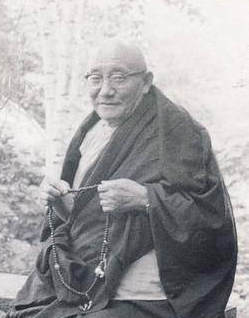
Dezhung Rinpoche III, likely Seattle, date unknown

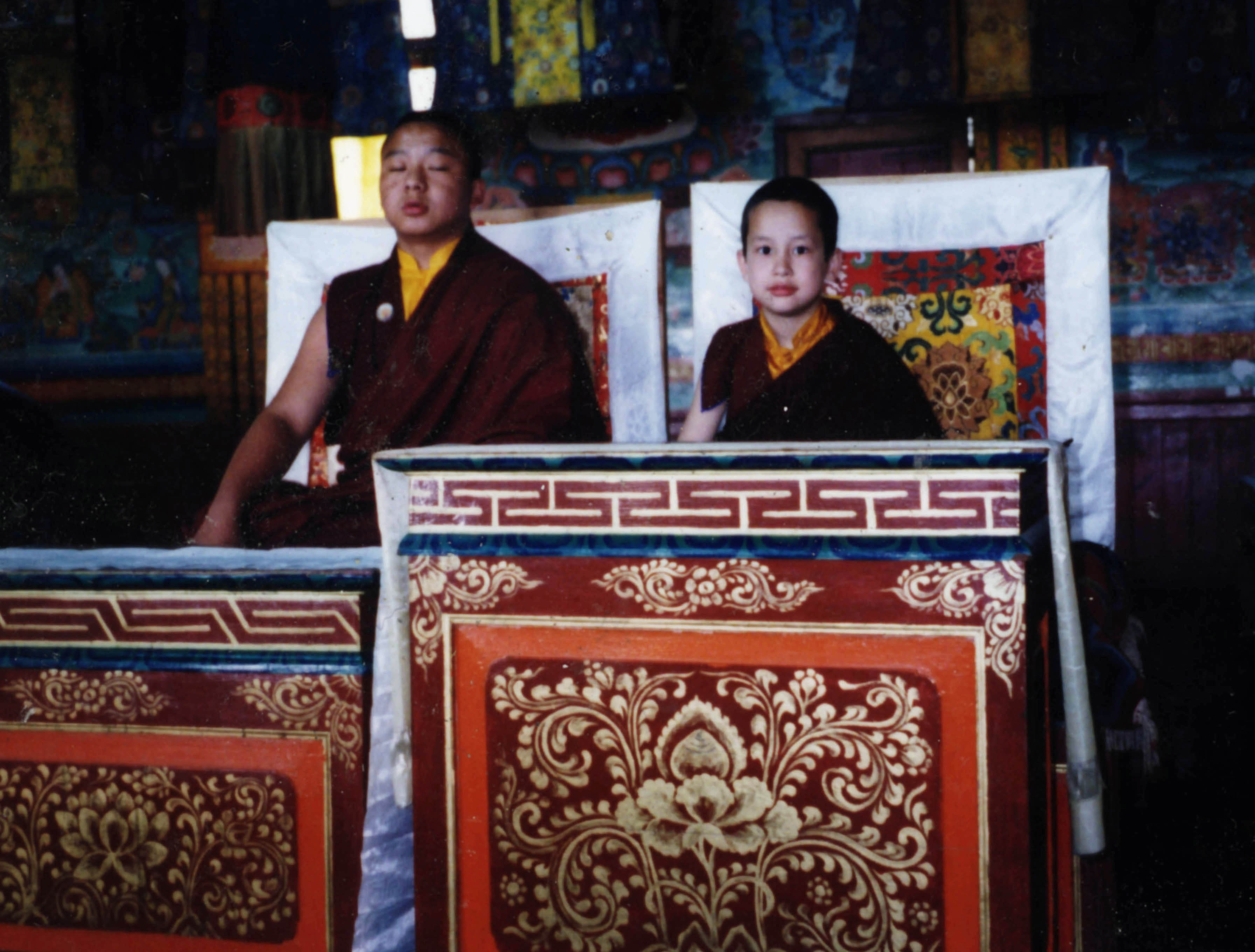
Tulku Dezhung Rinpoche IV in 1999

Dezhung Rinpoche Kunga Tenpai Nyima (Tibetan: སྡེ་གཞུང་རིན་པོ་ཆེ་ཀུན་དགའ་བསྟན་པའི་ཉི་མ་, Wylie: sde gzhung rin po che kun dga' bstan pa'i nyi ma), born Kunchok Lhundrup (February 26, 1906 – 1987), was a Tibetan lama of the Sakya school. Sakya is one of four major schools of Tibetan Buddhism, the others being the Nyingma, Kagyu, and Gelug. In 1960 he came to Seattle, Washington in the United States of America, one of the first Tibetan lamas to settle and teach in the United States.

Rinpoche was the teacher of a number of renowned Tibetologists, including Turrell V. Wylie and E. Gene Smith, Tibetan Art expert Jeff Watt and the root teacher of leading translator Christopher Wilkinson.

Rinpoche died in 1987. His reincarnation, Dezhung Rinpoche IV, was born in Seattle in 1991, and trained at Tharlam Monastery in Nepal.
