= Tharlam Monastery =

Tibetan Buddhist monastery in Kathmandu, Nepal

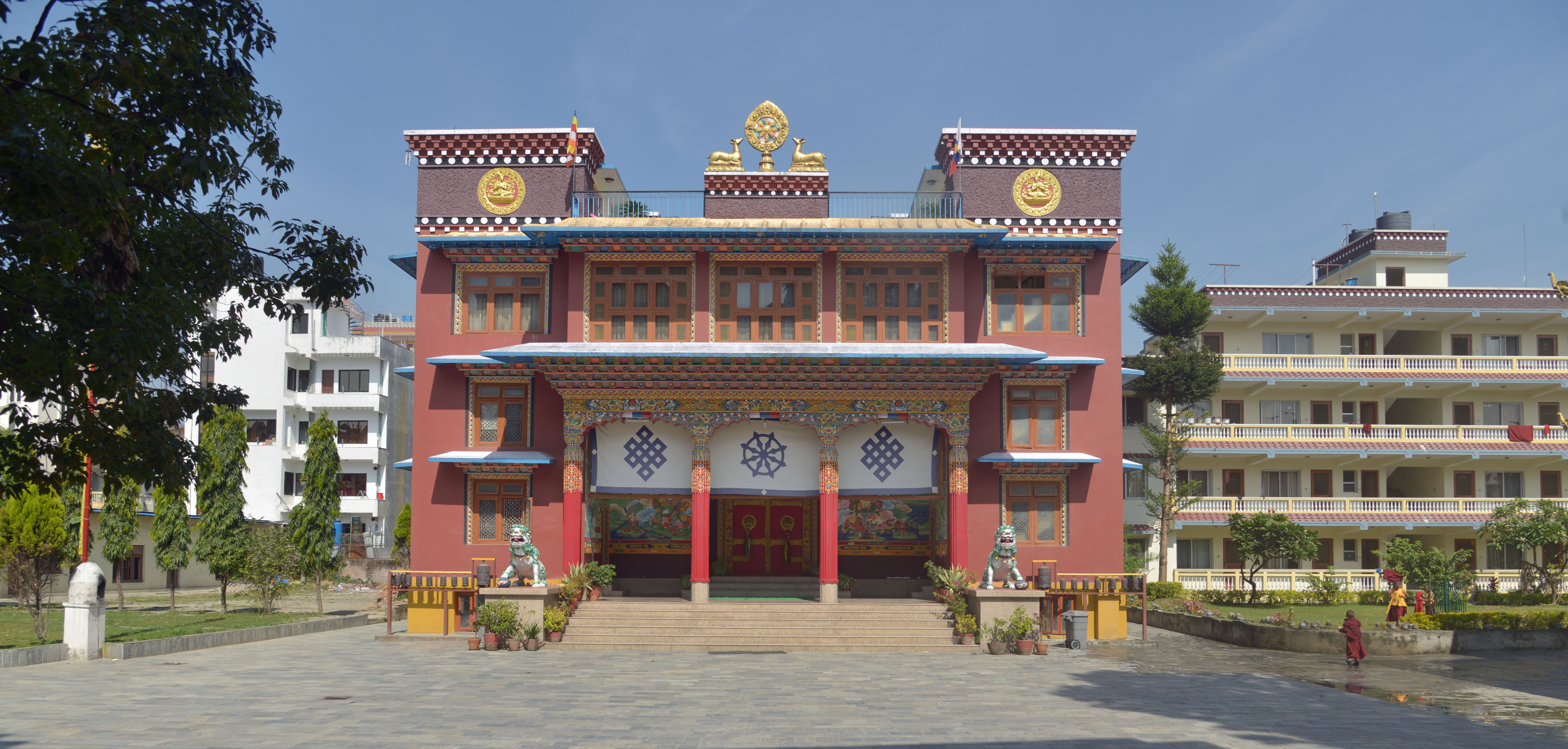
Tharlam Monastery, Kathmandu in 2015

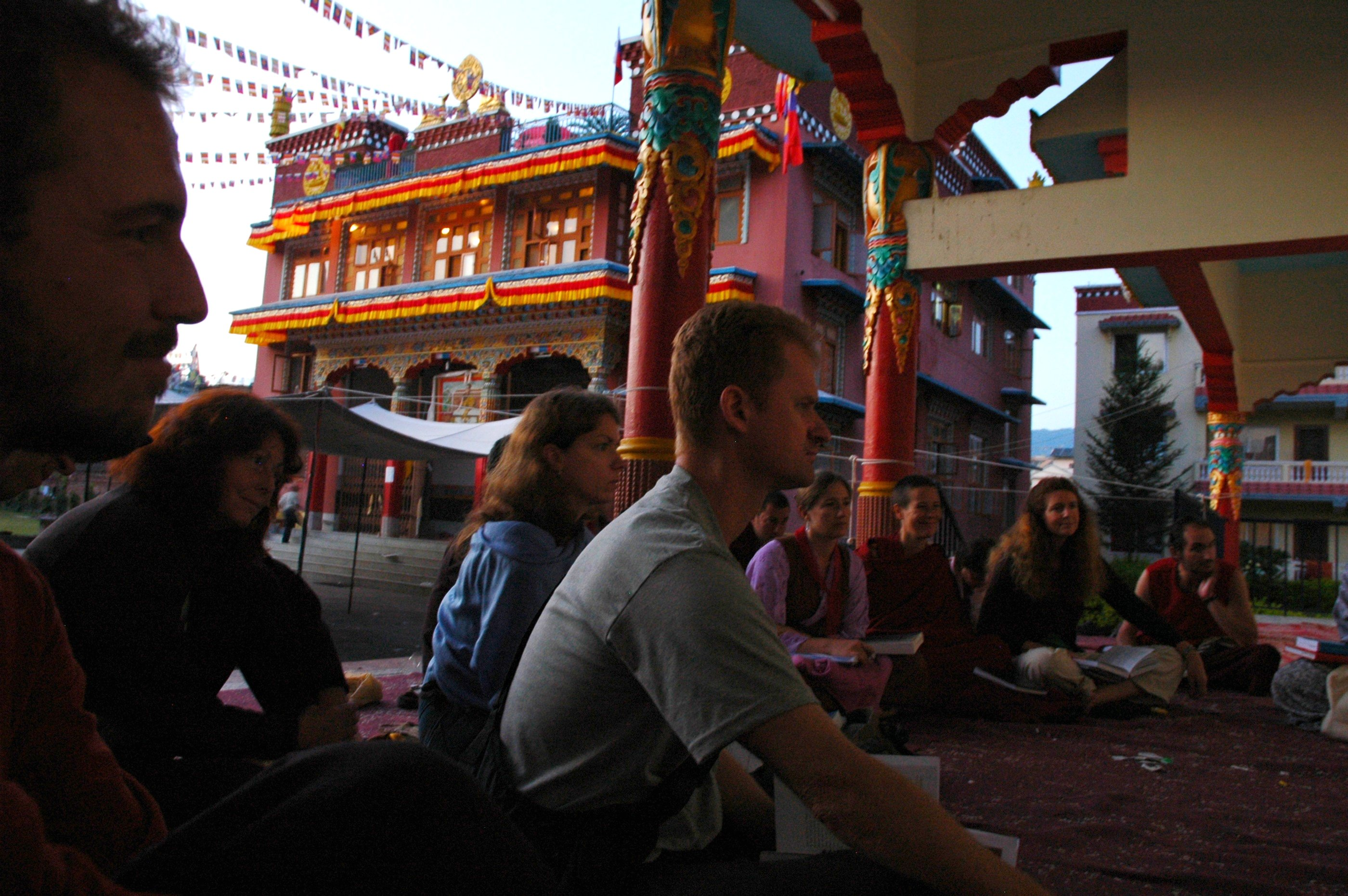
Tharlam students in 2007

Tharlam Monastery is a Tibetan Buddhist monastery of the Sakya sect in Boudhanath, Kathmandu, Nepal.

== History ==
In 1436, Ga Rabjampa Kunga Yeshe (1397 - 1470) founded Tharlam Monastery in Kham, Eastern Tibet. It was also known as Tarlam Sabzang Namgyaling, 唐隆寺, 汤陇寺, tanglong si, and Śrī Tarlam Ganden Sabzang Namgyel Ling (thar lam dga' ldan sa bzang rnam rgyal gling).

In 1959 the monastery was destroyed by Chinese communists. The monastery was rebuilt by Dezhung Rinpoche in Kathmandu, Nepal in 1981. 40 rooms for "meditation and retreat" were later built.

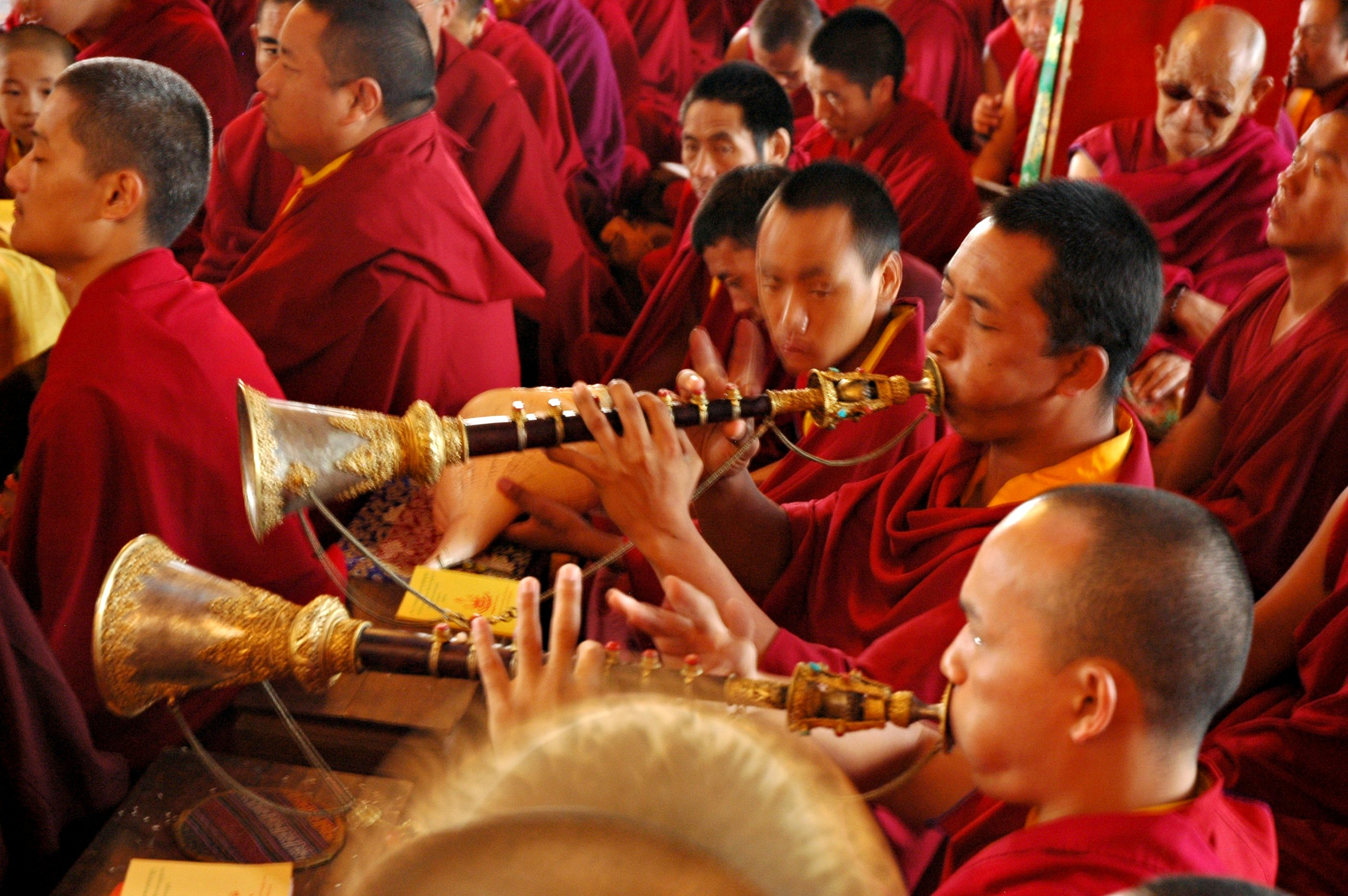
Tharlam Monastery Band Plays During Lamdre

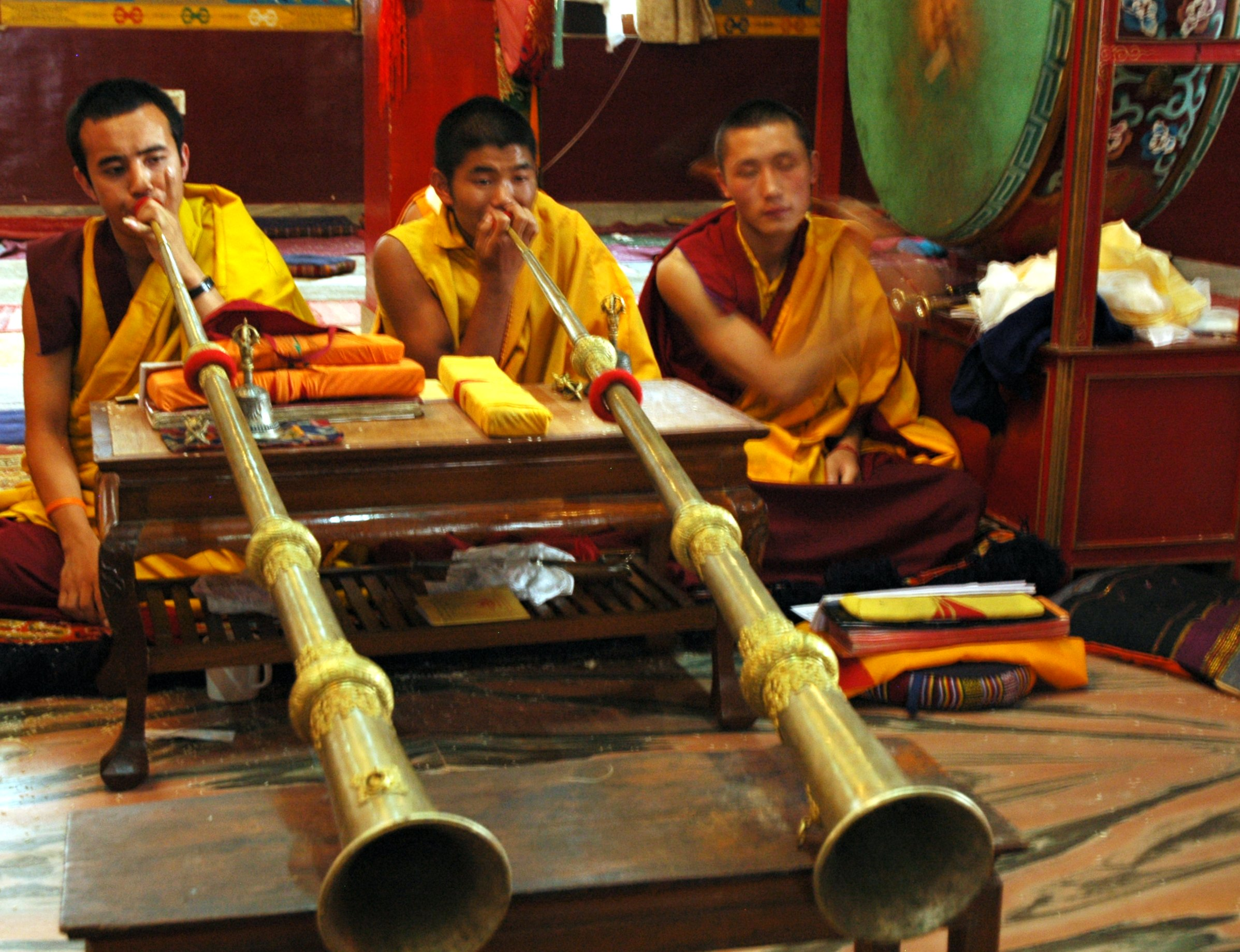
Tibetan Buddhist monks blowing the long horns, and drumming, Tharlam Monastery, closing ceremonies.

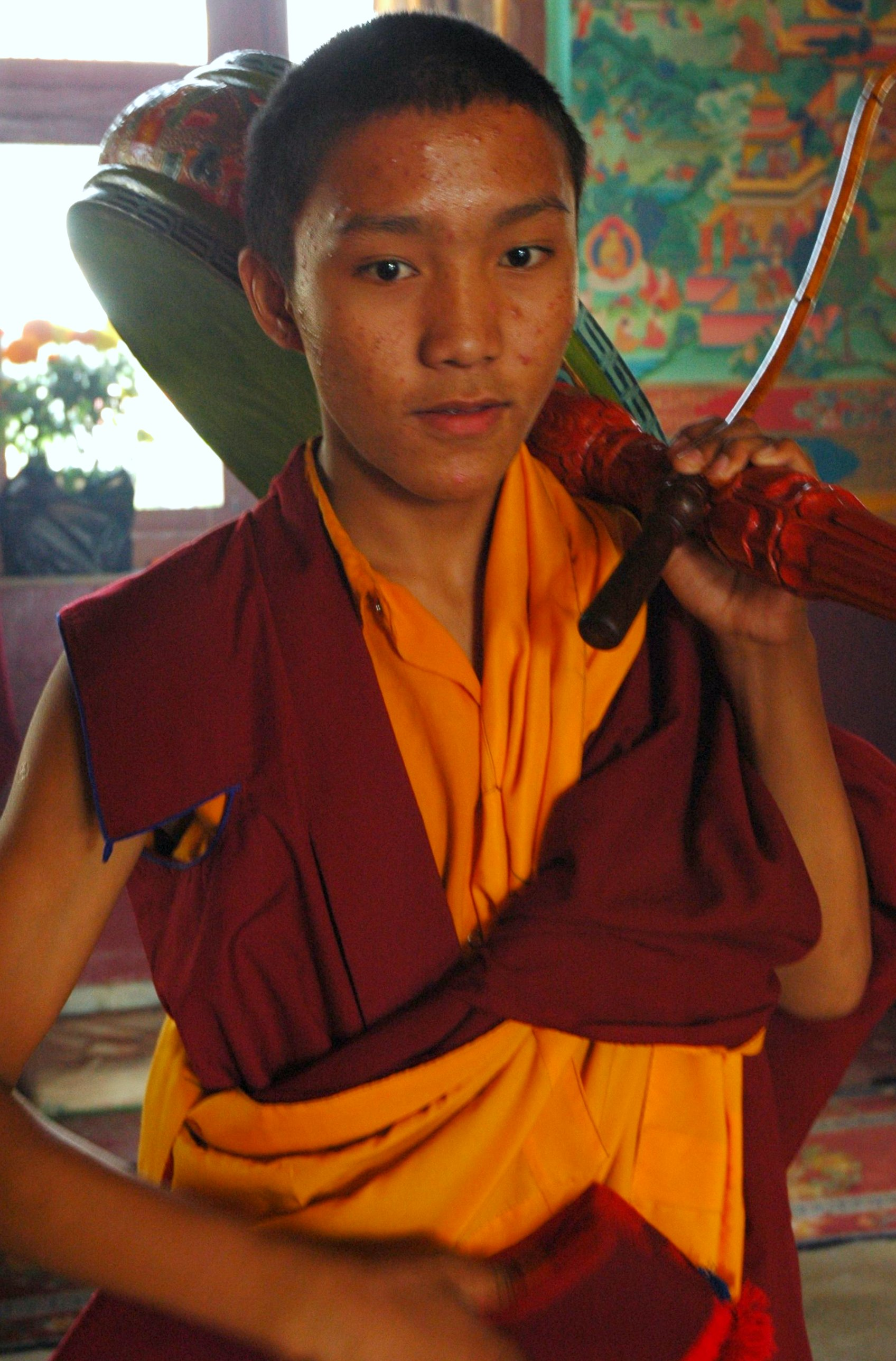
Young Tibetan Drummer with his drum on his shoulder gets prepared to play on Bodhisattva Day!
