= Pema Namding Monastery =

Nyingma Tibetan Buddhist monastery in Nepal

Coordinates: 27.604593°N 86.699969°E

Pema Namding Monastery is a Nyingma Tibetan Buddhist monastery in Nepal which was opened in April 2008. Trulsik Rinpoche of Thupten Chholing Monastery named this monastery. Ngawang Jigdral Rinpoche is the founder and Head Lama. It is located in Jubing VDC. Ward No. 09, Kharikhola, Solukhumbu, Nepal. It is located above the Kharikhola village and has a view of the surroundings including Mount Everest.
