= Phugmoche Monastery =

Phugmoche Monastery in Phugmoche village

Phugmoche Monastery Karma Chos-gLing
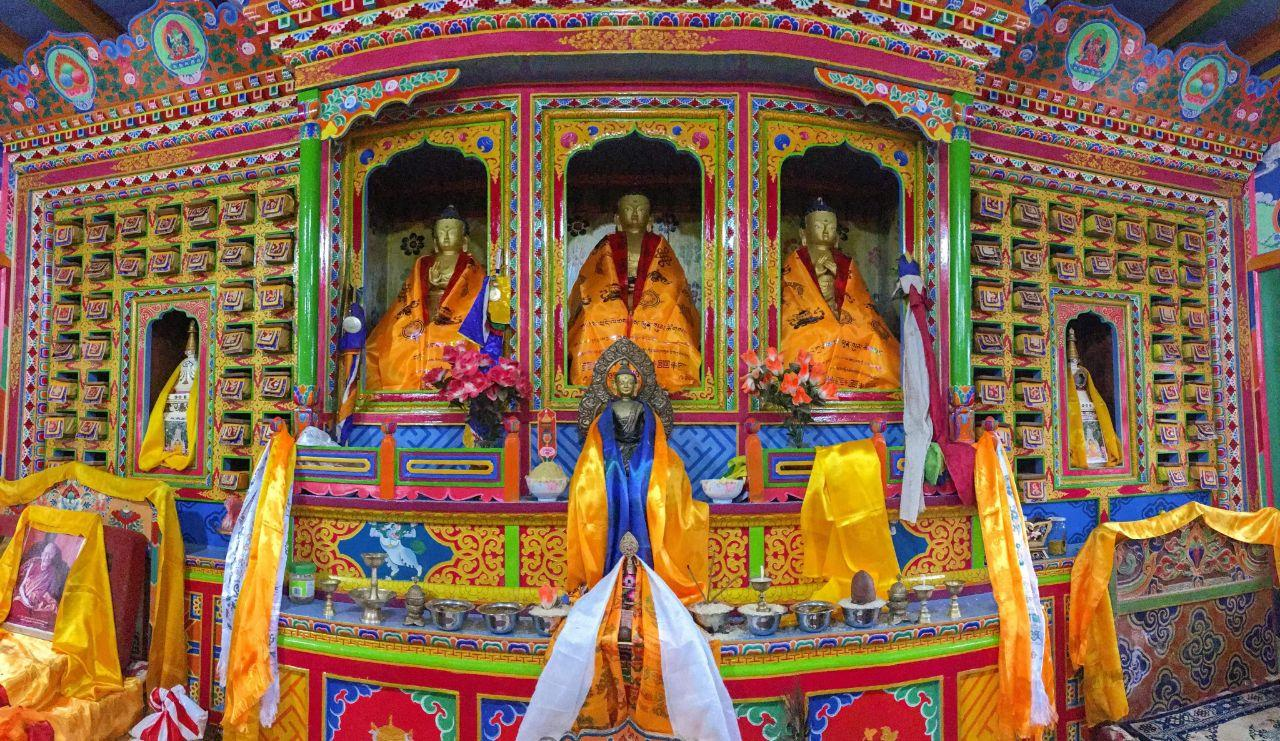
- Inside Statues of Phugmoche Monastery

- Location within Nepal

Religion
- Affiliation: Tibetan Buddhism
- Sect: Nyingma
- Festivals: Tshes-chu, Yulsang, Losar

Location
- Location: Phugmoche, Solududhkunda, Solukhumbu, Nepal
- Country: Nepal
- Interactive map of Phugmoche Monastery; Karma Chos-gLing
- Coordinates: 27°30′16″N 86°35′11″E

Architecture
- Style: Tibetan architecture
- Founder: Lama Ngagwang Yontan Gyamtsho in 1938
- Completed: 1938
- Located within the Solududhkunda

Phugmoche Monastery (or Phugmoche Gonpa), also known as Karma Chos-gLing. This monastery is situated in the Phugmoche village, Dudhkunda Municipality, Solu region of eastern Nepal. It was built in 1938 by Nyang-rigs bLa-ma Ngag-dBang-Yon-tan-rGya-mTsho. It is a Tibetan Buddhist monastery of the Sherpa community.

== History ==
Phugmoche Monastery or Karma Chos-gLing dGon-pa was built by Sherpa Lama Ngagwang Yontan Gyamtsho (bLa-ma Ngag-dBang-Yon-tan-rGya-mTsho) in 1938.

== Founder ==
The founder of Phugmoche Karma Chos-gLing Monastery (Lama Ngagwang Yontan Gyamtsho) was one of the renowned great and accomplished guru in the Sherpa community. He was born in Solukhumbu as son of the Nyang Clan (Nyang-rigs) father Lama Padma Tshewang and mother Drolma in 1875 AD. Since 13 years, he had studied astrology to Dzogpa Chenpo from his father Padma Tshewang and root guru Gangri Tshampa Rinpoche, Drubwang Shakya Shree, Chagchen Rinpoche, Kyabgon Dreltsad Dondan, Ngawang Thrinlas Lhundrub, Ngagwang Norbu Zangpo, Khanpo Sangyas Tanzin, Lama Danu and Lama Kyipa. His spiritual consort was Dechen Palmo also known as Gaga Kyipa. He had given many Tantric Teachings and Initiation to his disciples and died in 1964.
