= Seto Gumba =

Buddhist monastery in Nepal

Coordinates: 27.7257°N 85.2612°E

Seto Gumba (White Monastery सेतो गुम्बा) also known as Druk Amitabh Mountain, is a Buddhist monastery in Nepal. It is located in the Nagarjun Municipality of Kathmandu District. It is located outside the Ring Road, north of Swayambhu. While it used to be open for public visitors on Saturdays, it remained closed after the 2015 earthquake for maintenance and is now open for public visits on each Sunday.

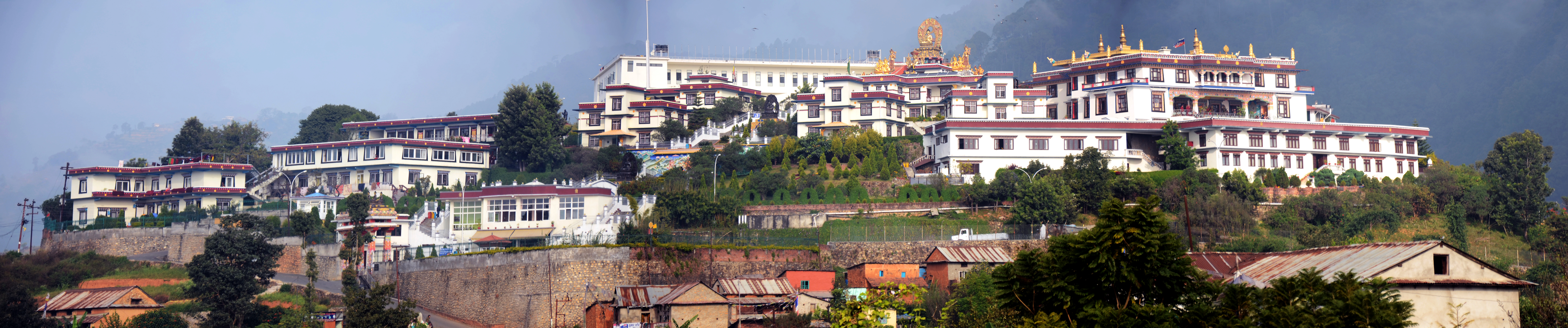
Seto Gumba (White Monastery) or Druk Amitabh Mountain of Kathmandu panoramic view 2013.
