= Gurung (surname) =

Gurung (Nepali: गुरुङ) is a common surname among people of the Gurung Tamu ethnic group in Bhutan, Nepal and India, as well as among other groups who are not ethnically Gurung (e.g. by some families of the Bhotiya in Dolpa). At the time of the 2011 Nepal census, 798,658 people (2.97% of the population of Nepal) identified as Gurung. Gurung people predominantly live around the Annapurna Region in Manang, Mustang, Dolpo, Kaski, Lamjung, Gorkha, Parbat and Syangja districts of Nepal. They are one of the main Gurkha tribes and have been established as one of the successful indigenous communities in Nepal. Most of the Gurung people serve in the military, farming, entertainment industry, business, entrepreneurship and politics. The origin of the Gurung people can be traced back to Qiang people located in Qinghai, China. Gurung people speak Gurung language which is part of the Sino-Tibetan languages family.

== Notable Gurung people ==
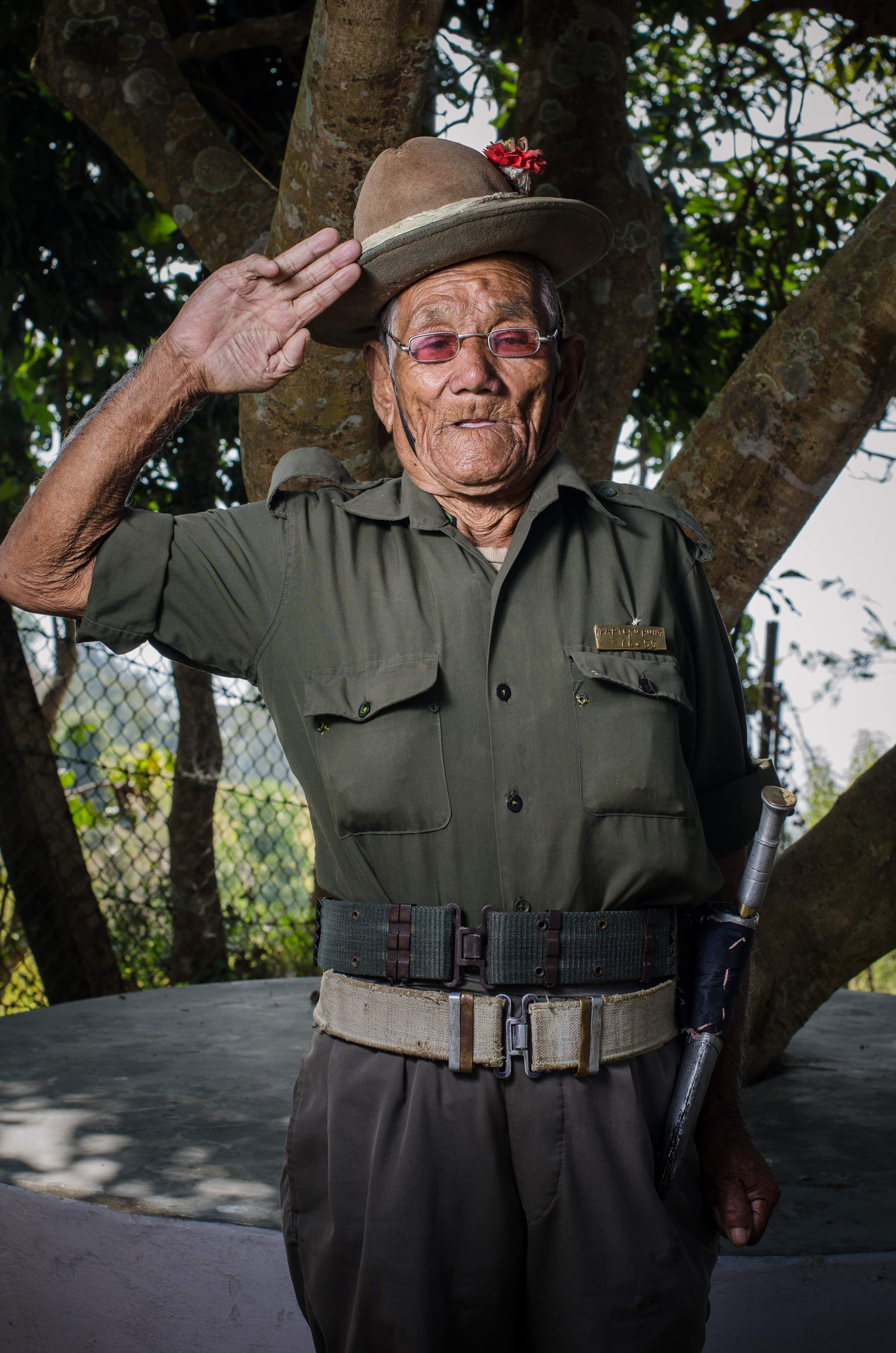
Rfn Parte Gurung, a Gurkha veteran receiving aid from The Gurkha Welfare Trust.

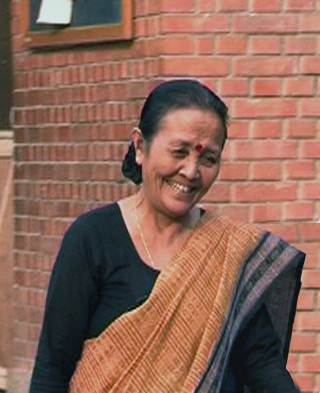
Anuradha Koirala Gurung at Maitighar, Nepal

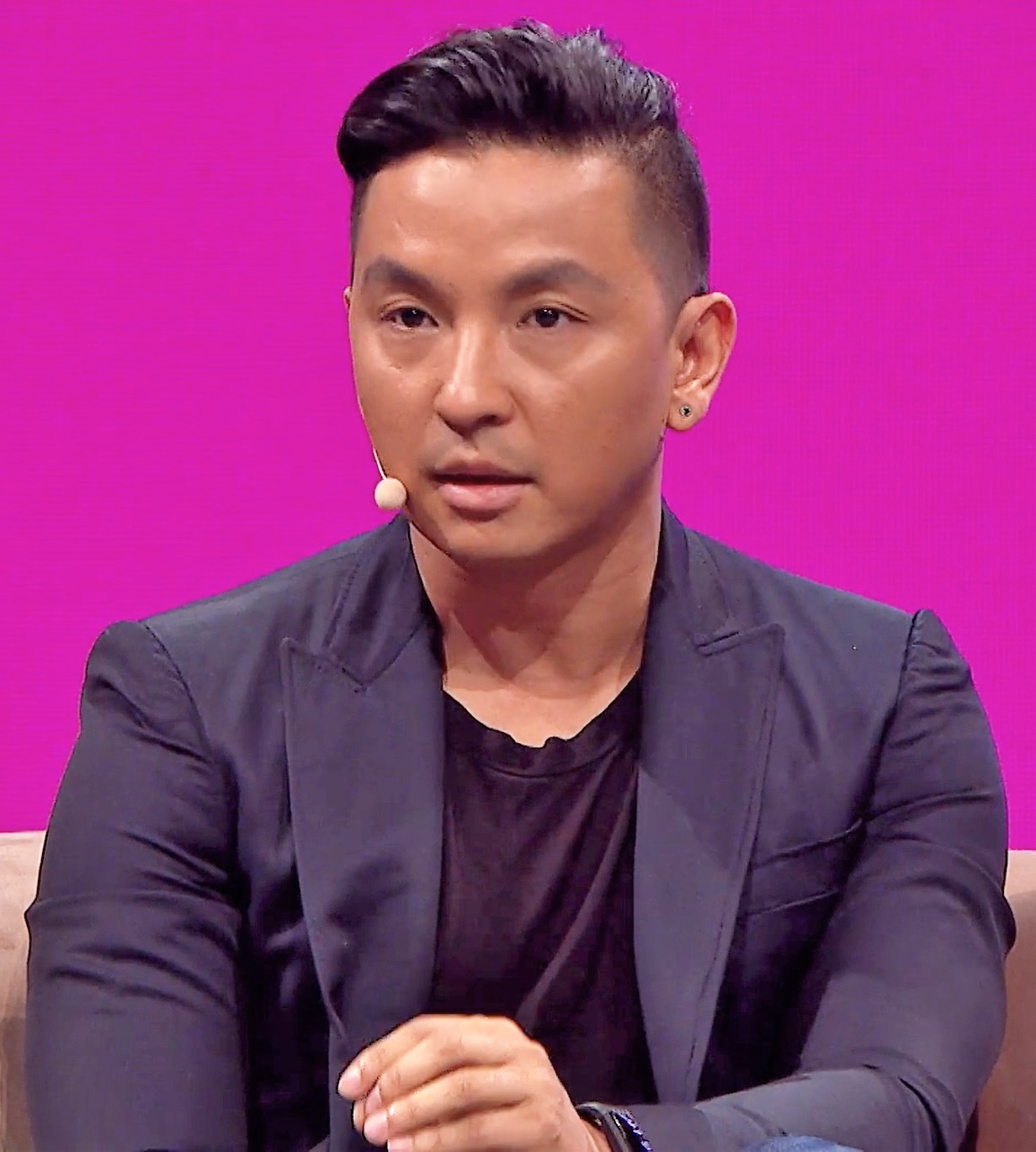
American Nepali designer Prabal Gurung at Copenhagen Fashion Week in 2017.

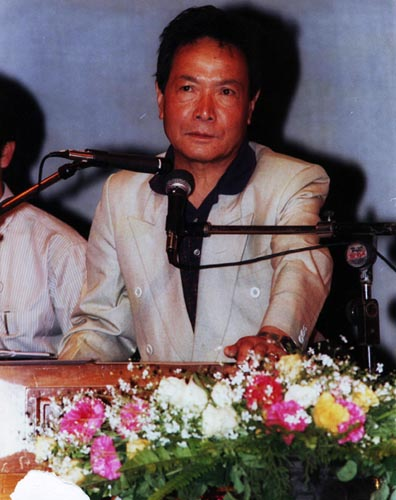
Shree Amber Gurung performing on the stage.

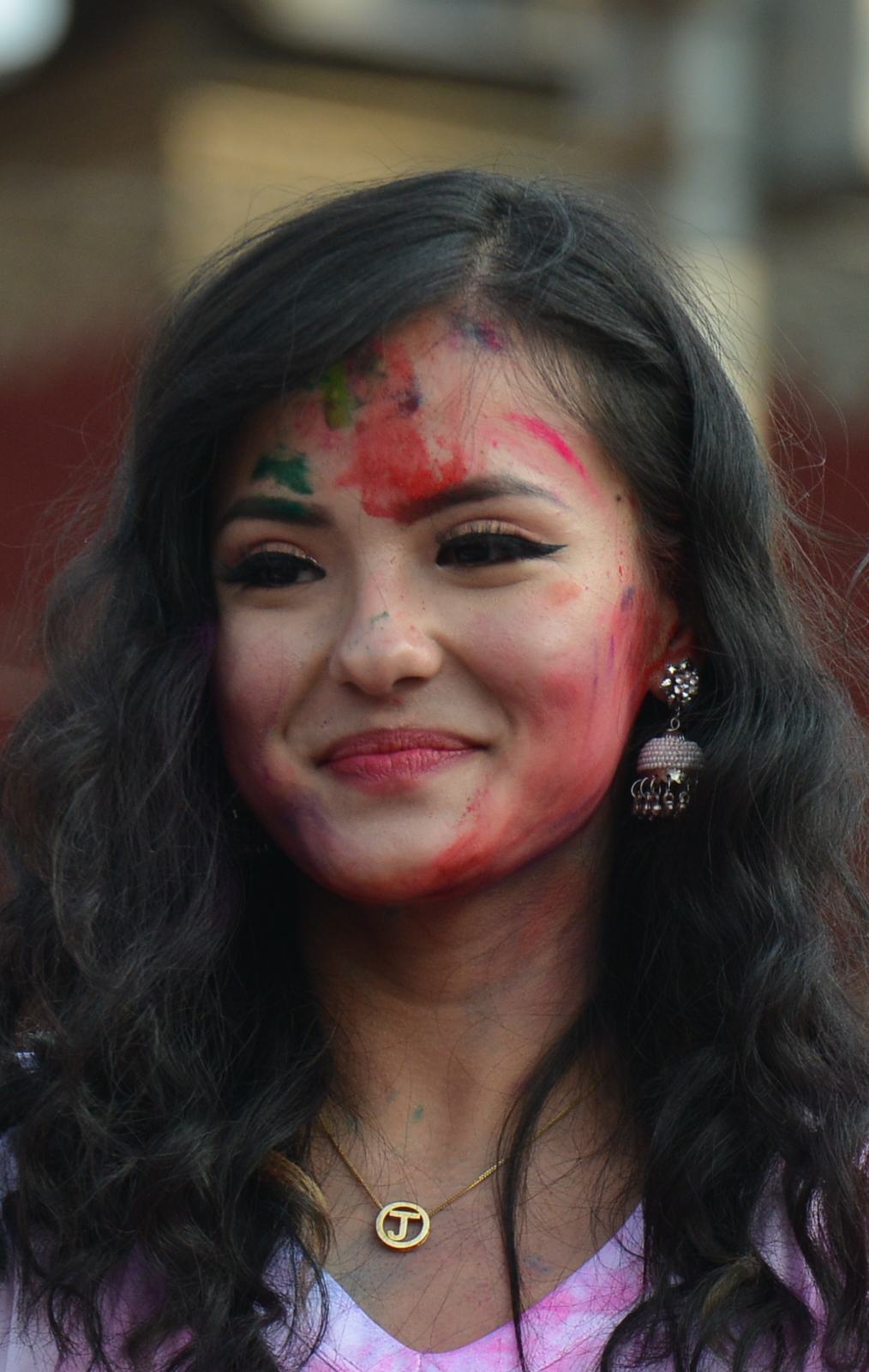
Jassita Gurung celebrating Holi festival in Kathmandu, Nepal.

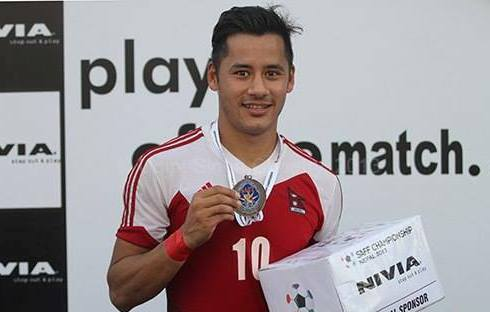
Anil Gurung celebrating victory at 2013 SAFF Championship.

Prayashna Gurung winner of Miss Universe Nepal 2026.

Notable individuals with the surname include:

== Public service, government, army, and police ==
- Anuradha Koirala Gurung (born Gurung), founder and director of Maiti Nepal, 1st women governor of Province no. 3
- Bhanbhagta Gurung (1921–2008), Victoria Cross recipient, British Indian Army
- Bharat Gurung, had served as the Royal A.D.C. to Late Prince Dhirendra Shah of Nepal in the 1980s.
- Chandra Gurung leader in conservation and sustainable field of Nepal.
- Chitrabahadur Gurung, Nepalese soldier in the British Indian Army
- Chhatra Man Singh Gurung (born 1952), Nepali military officer and Chief of Staff of the Nepali Army
- Lachhiman Gurung (1917–2010), Victoria Cross recipient, British Indian Army
- Pratima Gurung (1978–), campaigner for the rights of indigenous and disabled people in Nepal
- Tim Gurung, writer, army served for British Armed Forces
- Thaman Gurung (1924–44), Victoria Cross recipient, British Indian Army

== Politics ==
- Ambir Babu Gurung, Nepalese politician and member of the Communist Party of Nepal (Unified Marxist-Leninist) party
- B. B. Gurung, was the third Chief Minister of Sikkim.
- Bimal Gurung, Indian Gorkha Politician and one of the founders and the president of the Gorkha Janmukti Morcha (GJM)
- Chandra Bahadur Gurung (active 2008), politician
- Damber Singh Gurung, (1900 – 1948) Indian politician, lawyer and social worker
- Dev Gurung (before 1996–after 2008), politician
- Dhanraj Gurung, Nepali politician belonging to Nepali Congress
- Durga Gurung, politician belong to Nepali Congress
- Eliza Gurung, politician, beauty queen
- Gajendra Gurung, Indian politician
- Garjaman Gurung, politician of Sikkim Democratic Front party
- Gita Gurung, politician and member of Janamat Party
- Hemant Gurung, Bhutanese politician who has been a member of the National Assembly of Bhutan
- Hira Gurung, politician and a member of the House of Representatives of the federal parliament of Nepal
- Hit Kaji Gurung (active 1999–after 2008), politician
- Kul Bahadur Gurung (active 2008), politician
- Lal Kaji Gurung, politician and a member of the House of Representatives of the federal parliament of Nepal
- Mahadev Gurung (active 1999), politician
- Man Bahadur Gurung, politician
- Nanda Gurung, Nepalese politician and currently serving as the 2nd Speaker of the Karnali Provincial Assembly.
- Palten Gurung (active 1994–2008), politician
- Parbat Gurung, politician and former Minister of Communication and Information Technology
- Parshuram Megi Gurung, communist politician and member of the National Assembly
- Polden Chopang Gurung, politician, and a member of the House of Representatives
- Prakash Bahadur Gurung (active 1999), politician
- Prithvi Man Gurung, Chief Minister of State
- Prithvi Subba Gurung, Politician of Gandaki Province
- Rajiv Gurung, politician
- Renuka Gurung, politician and ex-State Minister of Women, Children and Senior Citizens
- Sita Gurung, politician, belonging to the Nepali Congress currently serving as the member of the 2nd Federal Parliament of Nepal
- Sudan Gurung, Nepali political activist
- Sunita Kumari Gurung, Nepalese politician and member of the Nepali Congress Party
- Surya Man Gurung (active 1999–2008), politician
- T. S. Gurung (1923–89), social and political worker
- Tek Bahadur Gurung, member of Nepali Congress, assumed the post of the Minister for Labour and Employment of Nepal
- Yashoda Gurung, politician member of the House of Representatives

== Education- historian, poet, professor ==
- D. B. Gurung, poet, novelist and essayist
- Gopal Gurung (born 1939–2016), politician, author, journalist, and vocal advocate of the human rights.
- Harka Gurung, geologist, anthropologist, and author
- Jamuna Gurung, Australian businesswomen and Billionaire
- Kedar Gurung, Indian educationist and writer of Nepalese literature, known for his satirical expressions
- Narsingh Gurung, Nepalese Kaji under King Rana Bahadur Shah
- Om Gurung, (1953–2022) sociologist and head of the Central Department of Sociology/Anthropology of the Tribhuvan University
- Ram Babu Gurung, writer and director
- Regan Gurung, American psychologist and award-winning author
- Sarita Gurung, philanthropist and social worker
- Shesh Ghale, Australian Businessman and Billionaire
- Toya Gurung, writer and poet

== Music, film and media ==
- Amber Gurung (1938–2016), composer, singer and lyricist
- Amrit Gurung, singer and leader of Nepathya band
- Anupama Aura Gurung (born 1988), Miss Nepal Earth 2011
- Chandra Kumari Gurung, former Nepali migrant worker in South Korea
- Chhetan Gurung (1979–2020) Nepalese film director and writer known for his work in Nepali cinema.
- Chhulthim Dolma Gurung, actress
- Ciney Gurung (active 2010), singer
- Dal Bahadur Gurung, comedian
- Jassita Gurung, Nepali actress
- Khem Raj Gurung, musician and singer
- Kiran Gurung (active 2008), politician
- Kishor Gurung, guitarist and ethnomusicologist
- Mausami Gurung, singer and songwriter
- Malewa Devi Gurung, first female singer of Nepal
- Milan Gurung, criminal and gangster
- Omi Gurung, Indian fashion designer
- Prabal Gurung (born 1979), New York fashion designer
- Prakash Gurung, musician and singer
- Praveen Gurung (born 1962–2000), folk music singer and music arranger
- Prayashna Gurung, Miss Universe Nepal 2026
- Ram Babu Gurung, writer and director
- Rishma Gurung, actress and model
- Sony Ghale Gurung, Miss Nepal Earth 2025
- Sukmit Gurung, modern classical singer
- Trishna Gurung, (born 1985) Nepali singer and also a coach of The Voice of Nepal Season 3, a reality show.

== Sports ==
- Amar Bahadur Gurung, Indian association football player
- Anil Gurung (born 1988), football player
- Anju Gurung (born 1994), Bhutanese cricketer
- Arika Gurung, Karate player and 2022 Asian Games silver medalist
- Bhim Gurung (born 1981), Marathon Runner, sky runner, who won four races of the Skyrunning World Series international circuit.
- Bijaya Gurung, Nepali football plater of Three Star Club
- Bishnu Gurung, football manager and former footballer who manages Fewa FC.
- Bivesh Gurung, football player for National League South club Maidstone United
- Chaman Singh Gurung, member of the 1952 Helsinki Olympics hockey team that won the gold medal
- Chitra Bahadur Gurung, former swimmer
- Darshan Gurung (born 2002), Nepalese former professional footballer who last played as a midfielder for New Road Team (NRT).
- Guru Baaje, archer
- Hari Gurung, Bhutanese footballer
- Hem Bahadur Gurung (active 1979–2009), former Inspector General of Police (IGP)
- Heman Gurung, International footballer who plays as a midfielder for Himalayan Sherpa Club
- Israil Gurung, Indian professional footballer
- Jamuna Gurung, former captain of the Nepal women's national football team.
- Jodha Gurung (born 1954), middle-distance runner
- Karun Gurung, Bhutanese former international football and futsal player
- Man Bahadur Gurung, football player for Druk Stars FC
- Nishma Gurung (born 1980), freestyle swimmer who represented Nepal in 1996 Summer Olympic Games
- Novin Gurung (born 1999), Indian professional footballer
- Prabesh Gurung, Indian cricketer
- Pur Bahadur Gurung, mountaineer and expedition guide
- Puran Andrew Gurung, Indian Taekwondo practitioner and coach
- Puran Kumar Gurung (born 1967), Indian politician from Sikkim
- Rajan Gurung (born 2000), football player
- Ram Prasad Gurung, boxer
- Robin Gurung (born 1992), Indian professional footballer
- Sanjay Gurung (born 1969), Nepalese cricket umpire
- Sipora Gurung, volleyball player
- Sirish Gurung, competitive swimmer
- Suvash Gurung (born 1991), Nepalese professional footballer who plays as a midfielder for Martyr's Memorial
- Tejan Gurung, mountaineer
- Yogesh Gurung, football player
