= Manang 1 =

Parliamentary constituency in Nepal

- Parliamentary constituency for the House of Representatives
- Manang 1 in Gandaki Province

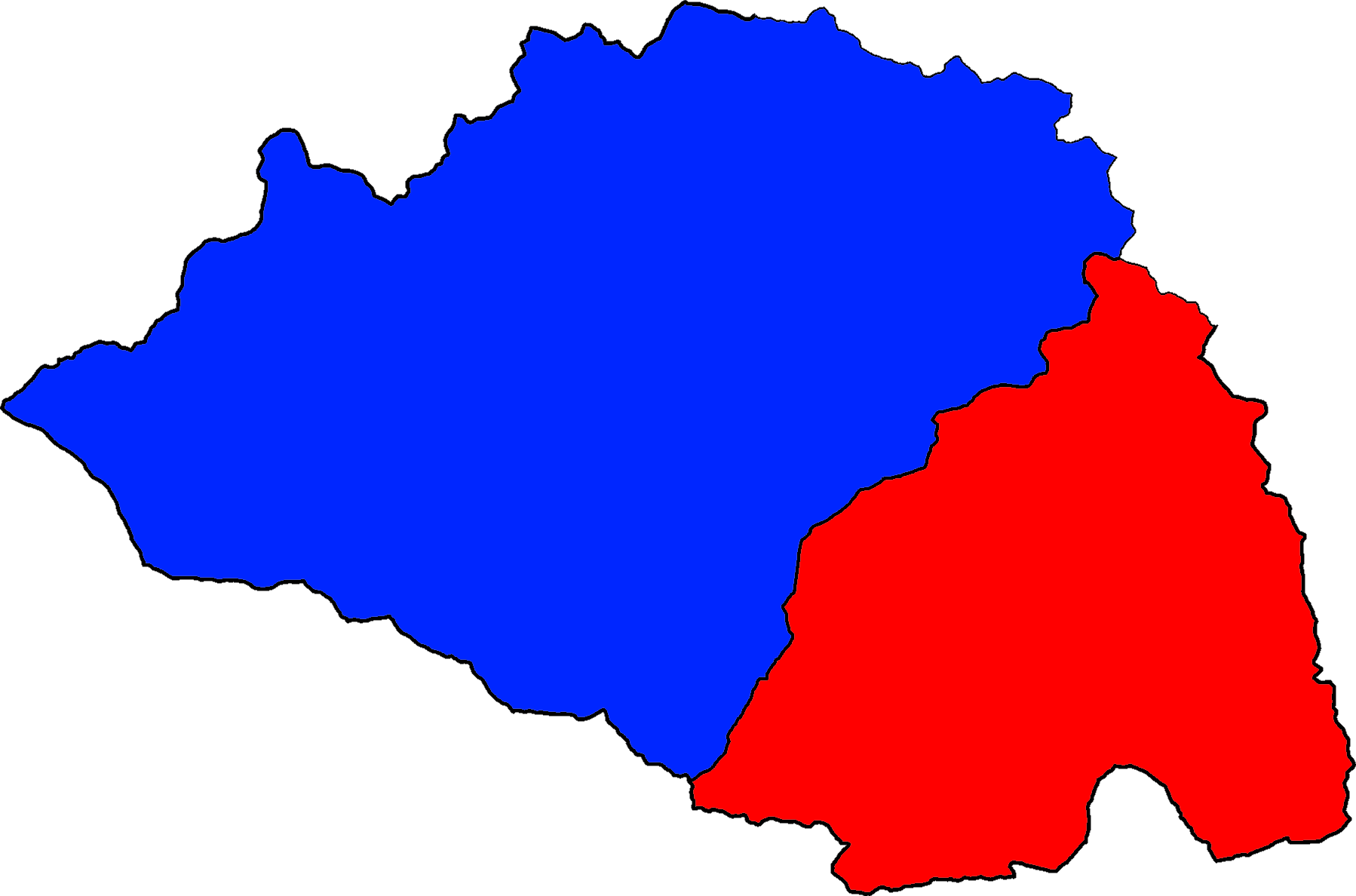
- Assembly segments Manang 1(A) and Manang 1(B) within Manang District
- Province: Gandaki Province
- District: Manang District
- Electorate: 5,881

Current constituency
- Created: 1991
- Party: Nepali Congress
- MP: Tek Bahadur Gurung
- Gandaki MPA 1(A): Chinta Bahadur Ghale (NC)
- Gandaki MPA 1(B): Rajiv Gurung (NCP)

Manang 1 is the parliamentary constituency of Manang District in Nepal. This constituency came into existence on the Constituency Delimitation Commission (CDC) report submitted on 31 August 2017.

== Incorporated areas ==
Manang 1 incorporates the entirety of Manang District.

== Assembly segments ==
It encompasses the following Gandaki Provincial Assembly segment

- Manang 1(A)
- Manang 1(B)

== Members of Parliament ==
=== Parliament/Constituent Assembly ===
Election	Member	Party
1991	Palten Gurung	Nepali Congress
1994	Palten Gurung	Independent
1999	Palten Gurung	Nepali Congress
2008	Dev Prasad Gurung	CPN (Maoist)
January 2009	Dev Prasad Gurung	UCPN (Maoist)
2013	Tek Bahadur Gurung	Nepali Congress
2017	Polden Chopang Gurung	CPN (Unified Marxist–Leninist)
May 2018	Polden Chopang Gurung	Nepal Communist Party
March 2021	Polden Chopang Gurung	CPN (Unified Marxist–Leninist)
2022	Tek Bahadur Gurung	Nepali Congress

=== Provincial Assembly ===
==== 1(A) ====
Election	Member	Party
2017	Chinta Bahadur Ghale	Nepali Congress
2022	Munindra Jung Gurung	Nepali Congress

==== 1(B) ====
Election	Member	Party
2017	Rajiv Gurung	Independent

== Election results ==
=== Election in the 2020s ===
==== 2022 general election ====
Candidate	Party	Votes	%	+/–
Tek Bahadur Gurung	Nepali Congress	2,575	53.35	
Polden Chopang Gurung	CPN (Unified Marxist–Leninist)	2,247	46.55	
Mukhya Gurung	Rastriya Swatantra Party	5	0.10	New
Total		4,827	100.00	–
Registered voters/turnout		6,779	–	
Majority		328	3.4	
Nepali Congress gain				
Source: Election Commission

==== 2022 provincial elections ====
===== 1(A) =====
Candidate	Party	Votes	%	+/–
Munindra Jung Gurung	Nepali Congress	1,255	56.97	
Rajan Bahadur Gurung	CPN (Unified Marxist–Leninist)	925	41.99	
Miphel Dhindu Lama	Rastriya Prajatantra Party	23	1.04	New
Total		2,203	100.00	–
Majority		330	7.49	
Nepali Congress hold				
Source: Election Commission

===== 1(B) =====
Candidate	Party	Votes	%
Rajiv Gurung	Independent	0	–
Total			
Independent hold			
Source: Election Commission

=== Election in the 2010s ===
==== 2017 legislative elections ====
Party	Candidate	Votes
CPN (Unified Marxist–Leninist)	Polden Tsopang Gurung	2,300
Nepali Congress	Tek Bahadur Gurung	2,021
Result	CPN (UML) gain	
Source: Election Commission

==== 2017 Nepalese provincial elections ====
===== 1(A) =====
Party	Candidate	Votes
Nepali Congress	Chinta Bahadur Ghale	998
CPN (Unified Marxist–Leninist)	Dorje Damdul Gurung	896
Result	Congress gain	
Source: Election Commission

===== 1(B) =====
Party	Candidate	Votes
Independent	Rajiv Gurung	1,410
Nepali Congress	Karma Gurung	1,020
Result	Independent gain	
Source: Election Commission

==== 2013 Constituent Assembly election ====
Party	Candidate	Votes
Nepali Congress	Tek Bahadur Gurung	1,527
Rastriya Prajatantra Party	Triple P Gurung	1,192
Rastriya Prajatantra Party Nepal	Bhujung Gurung	563
UCPN (Maoist)	Kapil Lama	261
CPN (Unified Marxist–Leninist)	Tshiring Lopsang Gurung	80
Result	Congress gain	
Source: NepalNews

=== Election in the 2000s ===
==== 2008 Constituent Assembly election ====
Party	Candidate	Votes
CPN (Maoist)	Dev Prasad Gurung	1,652
Nepali Congress	Palten Gurung	1,209
Others		47
Result	Maoist gain	
Source: Election Commission

=== Election in the 1990s ===
==== 1999 legislative elections ====
Party	Candidate	Votes
Nepali Congress	Palten Gurung	Unopposed
Result	Congress gain	
Source: Election Commission

==== 1994 legislative elections ====
Party	Candidate	Votes
Independent	Palten Gurung	2,315
Nepali Congress	Komal Ghale	721
Result	Independent gain	
Source: Election Commission

==== 1991 legislative elections ====
Party	Candidate	Votes
Nepali Congress	Palten Gurung	3,060
Samyukta Jana Morcha Nepal	Dilli Jang Gurung	621
Result	Congress gain	

== See also ==
- List of parliamentary constituencies of Nepal
