= Syangja 1 =

Parliamentary constituency in Gandaki Province, Nepal

- Parliamentary constituency for the House of Representatives
- Syangja 1 in Gandaki Province

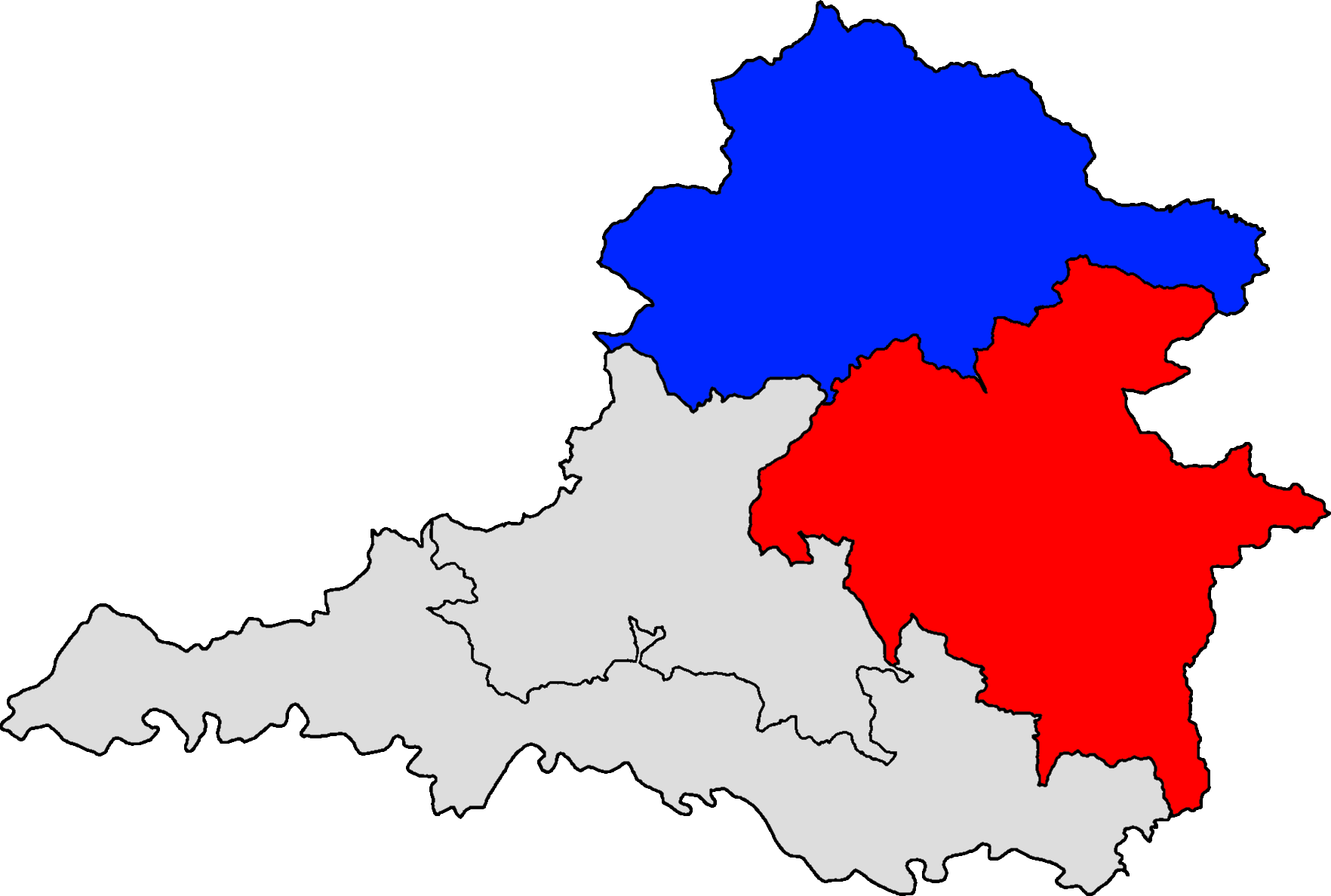
- Assembly segments Syangja 1(A) and Syangja 1(B) within Syangja District
- Province: Gandaki Province
- District: Syangja District
- Electorate: 108,689

Current constituency
- Created: 1991
- Party: Rastriya Swatantra Party
- MP: Dhananjaya Regmi
- Gandaki MPA 1(A): Deepak Thapa (NCP)
- Gandaki MPA 1(B): Min Prasad Gurung (NCP)

Syangja 1 is one of two parliamentary constituencies of Syangja District in Nepal. This constituency came into existence based on the Constituency Delimitation Commission (CDC) report submitted on 31 August 2017.

== Incorporated areas ==
Syangja 1 incorporates Arjunchaupari Rural Municipality, Aandhikhola Rural Municipality, Phedikhola Rural Municipality, Putalibazar Municipality, Biruwa Rural Municipality, Harinas Rural Municipality, wards 1–4 of Bhirkot Municipality and, wards 3 and 4 of Waling Municipality.

== Assembly segments ==
It encompasses the following Gandaki Provincial Assembly segment

- Syangja 1(A)
- Syangja 1(B)

== Members of Parliament ==
=== Parliament/Constituent Assembly ===
Election	Member	Party
1991	Gopal Man Shrestha	Nepali Congress
1994	Trilochan Sharma Dhakal	CPN (Unified Marxist–Leninist)
1999	Hit Kaji Gurung	CPN (Unified Marxist–Leninist)
2013	Raju Thapa	Nepali Congress
2017	Narayan Prasad Marasini	CPN (Unified Marxist–Leninist)
May 2018	Narayan Prasad Marasini	Nepal Communist Party
March 2021	Narayan Prasad Marasini	CPN (Unified Marxist–Leninist)
2022	Raju Thapa	Nepali Congress
2026	Dhananjaya Regmi	Rastriya Swatantra Party

=== Provincial Assembly ===
==== 1(A) ====
Election	Member	Party
2017	Deepak Thapa	CPN (Maoist Centre)
May 2018	Deepak Thapa	Nepal Communist Party

==== 1(B) ====
Election	Member	Party
2017	Min Prasad Gurung	CPN (Unified Marxist-Leninist)
May 2018	Min Prasad Gurung	Nepal Communist Party

== Election results ==
=== Election in the 2020s ===
==== 2022 general election ====
Candidate	Party	Votes	%
Raju Thapa	Nepali Congress	31,999	46.65
Narayan Prasad Marasini	CPN (UML)	28,744	41.90
Bodhraj Regmi	Rastriya Swatantra Party	6,065	8.84
Others		1,786	2.60
Total		68,594	100.00
Majority		3,255	
Nepali Congress			

==== 2022 provincial election ====
===== 1(A) =====
Candidate	Party	Votes	%
Sita Kumari Sundas	CPN (UML)	14,690	45.67
Amrita Thapa	CPN (Maoist Centre)	13,267	41.24
Surya Lal Shrestha	Rastriya Prajatantra Party	1,511	4.70
Makbul Miya	Hamro Nepali Party	982	3.05
Tirath Gurung	Mongol National Organisation	945	2.94
Others	773	2.40	
Total		32,168	100.00
Majority		1,423	
CPN (UML)			

===== 1(B) =====
Candidate	Party	Votes	%
Sudhir Kumar Paudel	CPN (UML)	17,441	47.17
Buddhi Bahadur Rana	Nepali Congress	17,435	47.15
Shanti Kumari Hamal	Rastriya Prajatantra Party	1,574	4.26
Others	525	1.42	
Total		36,975	100.00
Majority		6	
CPN (UML)			

=== Election in the 2010s ===
==== 2017 legislative elections ====
Party	Candidate	Votes
CPN (Unified Marxist–Leninist)	Narayan Prasad Marasini	39,226
Nepali Congress	Raju Thapa	28,662
Others		588
Invalid votes		1,729
Result	CPN (UML) gain	
Source: Election Commission

==== 2017 Nepalese provincial elections ====
===== 1(A) =====
Party	Candidate	Votes
CPN (Maoist Centre)	Deepak Thapa	17,392
Nepali Congress	Kamal Prasad Pangeni	14,666
Others		733
Invalid votes		703
Result	Maoist Centre gain	
Source: Election Commission

===== 1(B) =====
Party	Candidate	Votes
CPN (Unified Marxist–Leninist)	Min Prasad Gurung	20,248
Nepali Congress	Tulsi Giri	14,510
Others		1,080
Invalid votes		880
Result	CPN (UML) gain	
Source: Election Commission

==== 2013 Constituent Assembly election ====
Party	Candidate	Votes
Nepali Congress	Raju Thapa	16,699
CPN (Unified Marxist–Leninist)	Narayan Prasad Marasini	15,411
UCPN (Maoist)	Shailendra Ghimire	4,710
Rastriya Prajatantra Party Nepal	Chandra Bahadur Gurung	1,881
Others		1,834
Result	Congress gain	
Source: NepalNews

=== Election in the 2000s ===
==== 2008 Constituent Assembly election ====
Party	Candidate	Votes
CPN (Unified Marxist–Leninist)	Hit Kaji Gurung	18,101
Nepali Congress	Kamal Prasad Pangeni	16,394
CPN (Maoist)	Deepak Thapa	12,733
CPN (United)	Thakur Prasad Sharma	1,283
Others		1,734
Invalid votes		2,333
Result	CPN (UML) hold	
Source: Election Commission

=== Election in the 1990s ===
==== 1999 legislative elections ====
Party	Candidate	Votes
CPN (Unified Marxist–Leninist)	Hit Kaji Gurung	22,733
Nepali Congress	Jagar Bandhu Aryal	20,722
Rastriya Prajatantra Party	Chandra Bahadur Gurung	4,848
CPN (Marxist–Leninist)	Amar Nath Sharma	1,165
Others		503
Invalid Votes		927
Result	CPN (UML) hold	
Source: Election Commission

==== 1994 legislative elections ====
Party	Candidate	Votes
CPN (Unified Marxist–Leninist)	Trilochan Sharma Dhakal	20,969
Nepali Congress	K.P. Rudra Man Gurung	18,974
Rastriya Prajatantra Party	Jhum Bahadur Gurung	4,989
Others		1,283
Result	CPN (UML) gain	
Source: Election Commission

==== 1991 legislative elections ====
Party	Candidate	Votes
Nepali Congress	Gopal Man Shrestha	17,266
CPN (Unified Marxist–Leninist)		10,262
Result	Congress gain	

== See also ==
- List of parliamentary constituencies of Nepal
