= Gurung (disambiguation) =

Gurung may refer to:

- The Gurung people or Tamu, an ethnic group of Nepal and India
  - Gurung language
  - Gurung (surname), with a list of people of this name
  - Gurung shamanism
- Gurung Hill, a mountain in the Ladakh border area of China and India
- Gurung Hill, a peak near Annapurna in Nepal
- Major Ranjit Singh Gurung, fictional Indian Army major portrayed by Danny Denzongpa in the 1998 Indian film China Gate

== See also ==
- Tamu (disambiguation)
