= Shambhu Prasad =

Shambhu Prasad or Shambhuprasad is a given name. People with the name include:

- Shambhuprasad Tundiya
- Shambhu Prasad Dhungel
- Shambhu Prasad Dhakal

== See also ==
- 2017 Rajbiraj municipal election#Shambhu Prasad Yadav
- 2022 Rajbiraj municipal election#Shambhu Prasad Yadav
