= Tamu =

Tamu or TAMU may refer to:

- Texas A&M University, an American university
- Tamu, Myanmar
  - Tamu District, Myanmar
  - Tamu Township
- Ta'mu, rice cooked in woven coconut leaves from the Philippines
- Tamu Massif, an inactive underwater volcano in the Pacific
- Heliophorus tamu, a butterfly of family Lycaenidae
- Tamu people or Gurung, an ethnic group of Nepal
- Tamu (bivalve), a mollusk genus of the family Mytilidae
- Tamu, a lioness in the 2006 series of Big Cat Diary
- Tamu, an ancient Proto-Malayo-Polynesian term for a marketplace

== People with the surname ==
- Bwana Tamu (fl. 1713), Kenyan sultan

== See also ==
- Gurung (disambiguation)
- Tampere United or TamU-K, a Finnish football club
- Tamu Kyi, an alternative name for the Gurung language
- Tamus, a genus of flowering plants
