= Garden F.C. =

Nepali football club

Garden
- Full name: Garden Football Club
- Nickname(s): Fulbari
- Founded: 2004 (2058 B.S.)
- Ground: Pokhara Rangasala, Pokhara, Nepal
- Capacity: 16,500
- Chairman: Milan Gurung
- Manager: Naresh Gurung
- Coach: Himal Gurung
- League: Kaski District League
- 2013: 1st

Garden Football Club is a Nepali semi-professional football club based in Fulbari, Pokhara, known as Garden is one of the most competitive team in western region in Nepal.

== Season 2069 B.S. (2012–13 AD) ==
The club was successful in winning the Balram Memorial Kaski District League, Sainik Cup, ABC Cup, Bhimkali Cup, Bagar Vai Khalak Cup, Lamachaur cup, Adarsha Cup and other local cups.

== Club Officials ==
Board of directors

- President: Milan Gurung

Training Staff

- Coach: Himal Gurung
- Assistant Coach: Amrit Gurung

== Achievements ==
- Kaski District League: 1

2013

- Adrasha Cup: 1

2013

== Current squad ==
- Bikash Gurung, DF (Captain)
- Subash Gurung, DF
- Bishwa Gurung, MF
- Som Gurung, GK
- Tenzin Namgyal, GK
- Biraj Gurung, MF
- Bidhan Karki, ST
- Madan Gurung, MF
- Sidarth Gurung, MF
- Anil Gurung, ST
- Bimal Basnet, ST
- Kumar Gurung, ST
- Kiran Gurung, DF
- Suraj Shahi, DF
