= Guru Baaje =

Guru Baaje was born as a Dhanu Gurung and was from Dhanubas. He was also known as Dharma Gurung. He became famous as Dhanu Guru in 18th century Nepal when people realized his extraordinary mastership in archery; he later was called Guru Baaje for his profound wisdom on the dharma when he moved to Kalabang (Kaloban/Black Forest) Gareti, Pumdibhumdi, Nepal.

At this time that a program of archery was held in Nuwakot by the king of Nuwakot. In this program Dharma Gurung, representing Kaski state, and Malla Thakuri of Baglung, representing Parbat, were called for the well-known mastership of their archery. Dharmu Gurung and Malla Thakuri reached the final.

Malla Thakuri took the first attempt, and he broke the thread in the sky. Dharma Gurung he said it's meaningless to hit a thread of such easiness. When the king asked what type of thread he likes to hit, he said, looking to the mirror in front, 'I want to hit the thread in the sky behind.' In this way he hit the thread into two.

When he was back home, the king of Kaski state asked him to ask for any boon. He asked for the Kaaloban (Black Forest) (called Kalabang by Gurungs) to be granted where he could build his commune of lineage and practice dharma at its highest level.

He was a master of pye tan lyu tan and a guru of many siddha vidhyas. People used to come to him for treatment from far and wide and to learn about dharma and secret tantra vidyas. People called him Guru Baaje for his profound encyclopedic wisdom.

When Guru Baaje realized time was going to have its way, he called all. Mainly pointing to Karnu Gurung he said:

“Ours is a tradition of Guru and we hold the light of Gurus hence we are called Gurungs. From 1 to 9 it is a whole number, I am the first of this generation and by the time of 9th generation it will be complete as 9 is a last number. Then in the 10th generation there will be born a master guru himself, an Adiguru incarnate who will transcend all dharmas and gurus, his name will start with A. And as 10 represents eternity he will not be Kshina but will be Aadi and Anadi. A master guru a siddhabuddha will he be to save many a life and simply but incredibly will he use his methods.”

After this he said syai syai and moved to the north never to be back.

== Gurung Dharma lineage ==
Guru Baaje - Karnu Gurung - Parsang Gurung - Pratapsing Gurung - Avir Gurung - Jeet Bhadhur Gurung - Kubersing Gurung - Deo kaji Gurung - Kajiman Gurung.

== See also ==
- Gurung Dharma
- Gurung
