= Regan Gurung =

Social psychologist

Regan A. R. Gurung
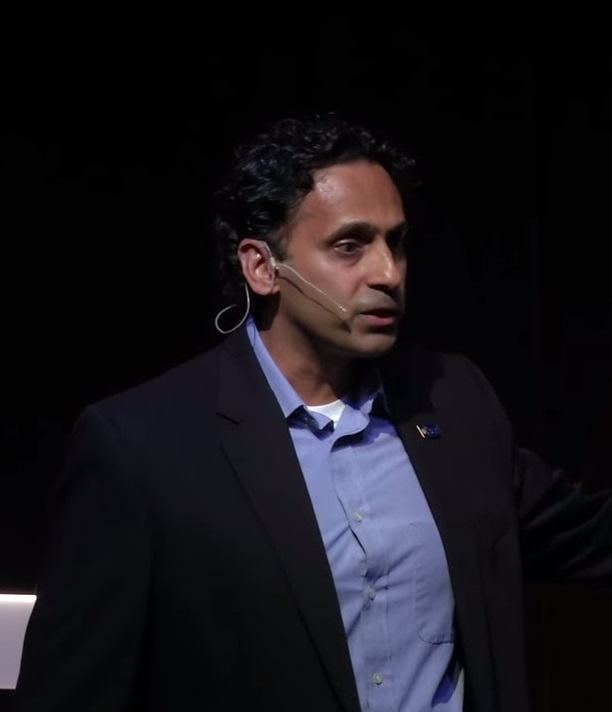
- Gurung in 2017
- Born: Regan A.R. Gurung; August 9, 1969 (age 57); Mumbai, India
- Education: University of Washington, PhD, 1996
- Scientific career
- Fields: Social psychology; Pedagogical psychology; Behavioral science
- Workplaces: Oregon State University (2019–present); University of Wisconsin; University of California, Los Angeles

Regan A. R. Gurung (born August 1969) is an American-Indian psychologist, professor, and author.

Gurung has served as president of Psi Chi, a founding co-editor of the Scholarship of Teaching and Learning in Psychology published by the American Psychological Association, and co-chair of the APA's Introductory Psychology Initiative. He has received numerous awards and honors for his contribution to social and pedagogical psychology. Gurung serves as a professor at Oregon State University.

== Background ==
Gurung was born in Mumbai, India. He moved to the United States at an early age.

At the origin of his educational itinerary, Gurung attended and received his undergraduate degree in psychology in 1991 at the liberal arts-based Carleton College in Minnesota. He later earned his Master's and PhD in social and personality psychology from the University of Washington in Seattle during the mid-1990s. Since completing his doctoral studies, he assumed the role of Postdoctoral Research Fellow at the National Institute of Mental Health at UCLA in 1996.

During the early 2000s, Gurung worked as an associate professor at the University of Wisconsin-Green Bay, ultimately becoming the chair at the university's Department of Psychology and later the associate dean of the Liberal Arts & Sciences.

As of 2019, he currently serves as a professor of psychology, associate vice provost and the executive director of the Center for Teaching and Learning and the psychology program at Oregon State University. He is also the founding co-editor of the APA's Scholarship of Teaching and Learning in Psychology journal.

== Career ==
Since his tenure began amid teaching at numerous American universities, Gurung has authored and released more than 120 academic articles in peer-reviewed journals, authored 15 books, and amassed mass media attention. He has also been the subject of several honors and awards by the leading initiatives and organizational bodies in the social sciences. Gurung also appeared in a TEDx Talk.

=== Honors ===
- President of the International Honor Society Psi Chi (2018)
- American Psychological Association Teacher Spotlight (2017)
- Co-chairman of APA's General Psychology Initiative
- Wisconsin Professor of the Year (Council for the Advancement and Support of Education)
- Fellow of the American Psychological Association
- Fellow at the Association for Psychological Science

=== Awards ===
- SAGE Textbook Excellence Award (2022)
- Charles L. Brewer Award for Distinguished Career in Teaching Psychology (2017)
- Distinguished Achievement Award, Carleton College Alumni Association (2016)
- Regent's Teaching Award, University of Wisconsin (2011)
- UWGB Founder's Award for Excellence in Teaching

== Books ==
Year	Title	Publisher	ISBN	Note
2005	Health Psychology: A Cultural Approach	Cengage Learning	978-0495600794	
2009	Getting Culture: Incorporating Diversity Across the Curriculum	Stylus	978-1579222802	
2011	An EasyGuide to APA Style	SAGE Publications	978-1544323725	Winner, SAGE Textbook Excellence Award, 2022
2014	Multicultural Approaches to Health and Wellness in America	ABC-CLIO	978-1440803505	
2016	An Evidence-based Guide to College and University Teaching	Routledge	978-1000486919	
2018	Health Psychology: Well-Being in a Diverse World	SAGE Publications	978-1506392356	
2021	Thriving in Academia: Building a Career at a Teaching-Focused Institution	American Psychological Association	978-1433836398	
2021	A Pocket Guide to Online Teaching	Routledge	978-1000369854	
2022	Everyday Applications of Psychological Science	Routledge	978-1000602456	
2023	Study Like a Champ: The Psychology-based Guide to "Grade A" Study Habits	American Psychological Association	978-1433840173	
