= Balram Memorial Kaski District League =

Balram Smriti Kaski District League is a semi-professional local district division of the All Nepal Football Association in Nepal. Contested by clubs of Kaski district Nepal. The tournament is played in league-cum-knockout format. The league stage is divided in groups and winners move on to the knockout stage. The winner of the tournament represent Kaski in further regional and Nepal National League.

== Notable clubs ==
- Amarsingh Boys Club(ABC)
- Bhimkali football club
- Garden Football Club
- Sahara Club (Pokhara)
- Sangam Club
