= Shambhu Prasad Dhungel =

Nepali poet (1885–1929)

Ashu Kavi Shambhu Prasad Dhungel
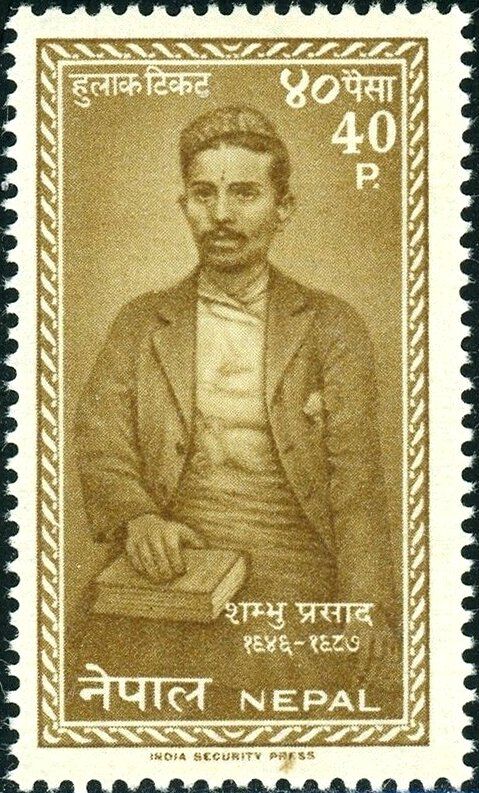
- Nepali stamp featuring Dhungel
- Born: 1885; Kathmandu, Nepal
- Died: 1929 (aged 43–44); Nepal

Shambhu Prasad Dhungel (Nepali: शम्भुप्रसाद ढुङ्गेल; born 1885 – 1929) was a Nepali author, playwright, and poet.

== Biography ==
Shambhu Prasad Dhungel was born in 1885 in Kathmandu, Nepal. Born into a well-to-do family, Dhungel spent his childhood years in comfort. At the age of 15, he wrote Panchak Prapancha. He later published books in Banaras with Punyaprasad Parkashan.

He was referred to as Ashu Kavi (lit. "spontaneous poet") by Chandra Shumsher Jang Bahadur Rana. Dhungel mostly based his works in Sanskrit plays. Dhungel wrote about fifteen plays, but only six have survived.

In 1962, the Government of Nepal issued postage stamps featuring Dhungel.

In 2003, D. B. Gurung said Dhungel was "a rare poetic genius".

== Works ==
- Ratnavali
- Krishna Charitra (1921)
- Hitopadesha (1923)
- Dhruva Charitra (1924)
- Mahabharata (1924)
- Shree Ādikavi Bhānu Bhaktācāryako Jivan – Caritra
