= Narayan Prasad Marasini =

Nepali politician

- नारायण प्रसाद मरासिनी

Member of Parliament, Pratinidhi Sabha
- In office 4 March 2018 – 18 September 2022
- Preceded by: Raju Thapa
- Constituency: Syangja 1

Personal details
- Born: 18 December 1967 (age 58)
- Party: CPN (UML)

Narayan Prasad Marasini (born 18 December 1967) is a Nepali communist politician and a member of the House of Representatives of the federal parliament of Nepal. He was elected from Syangja-1 constituency defeating Raju Thapa of Nepali Congress by more than 10,000 votes. A long time member of CPN UML, he represents the newly formed Nepal Communist Party (NCP) following the merger of the party with CPN (Maoist Centre). He was also the candidate for CPN UML in Syangja-1 constituency in the second constituent assembly election, in 2013.
