= If You Were Me =

- Hangul: 여섯 개의 시선
- RR: Yeoseot gaeui siseon
- MR: Yŏsŏt kaeŭi sisŏn
- Directed by: Jeong Jae-eun; Yim Soon-rye; Yeo Kyun-dong; Park Chan-wook; Park Jin-pyo; Park Kwang-su
- Written by: Kim Byeong-seo; Im Yeon-hui; Jeong Jae-eun; Yim Soon-rye; Park Chan-wook; Park Jin-pyo; Park Kwang-su
- Cinematography: Kim Byeong-seo; Kim Tae-han; Kim Jae-hong; Kim Byeong-il; Kim Dong-eun
- Edited by: Lee Chan-ho; Park Yoo-kyeong; Lee Eun-su; Choi Jae-geun; Moon In-dae; Kim Yang-il
- Music by: Oh Bong-jun; Jo Yeong-wook; Choi Seung-hyun; Park Ki-heon; Jo Seong-woo
- Distributed by: Chungeorahm
- Release date: November 14, 2003 (South Korea)
- Running time: 110 minutes
- Country: South Korea
- Language: Korean

If You Were Me is a 2003 South Korean omnibus film, comprising six short films directed by six prominent Korean directors, including Park Chan-wook. Commissioned by the National Human Rights Commission of Korea for ₩50 million (US$39,000) each, the shorts deal with discrimination in Korea and the directors were given free rein with regard to subject and style. The film has spawned three live-action sequels, as well as two animated films, which deal with similar themes.

== Plot ==
- "Crossing" - A disabled man on crutches hobbling along the streets of Sejongno, downtown Seoul. On paralytic actor Kim Moon-joo and disabled theatre group Hwol. Directed by Yeo Kyun-dong.
- "The Man with an Affair" - A former sex criminal has been cut off by his neighbors. Raises questions about the human rights of sex offenders. Directed by Jeong Jae-eun.
- "The Weight of Her" - A high school student must struggle to secure a job because of her undesirable appearance. Discusses discrimination against women. Directed by Yim Soon-rye.
- "Face Value" - Depicts work settings where job applicants are evaluated by their physical appearance in looks-obsessed Korean society. Directed by Park Kwang-su.
- "Tongue Tied" - Korean parents' extreme fervor for education is exposed as a child undergoes a tongue operation to enhance his ability in spoken English. Directed by Park Jin-pyo.
- "N.E.P.A.L.: Never Ending Peace and Love" - A Nepalese woman named Chandra spends six years in a mental hospital after she was mistaken for a Korean who had lost her mind. Based on the true story of Chandra Kumari Gurung. Addresses the human rights of foreign laborers in Korea. Directed by Park Chan-wook.

== Cast ==
- Jeong Jae-eun
- Yim Soon-rye
- Yeo Kyun-dong
- Park Chan-wook
- Park Jin-pyo
- Park Kwang-su
- Lee Ji-hyun as Nurse
- Kim Dae-gon as Physical education teacher

== Film series ==
There were five subsequent films in the series:

- If You Were Me 2 (2006)
- If You Were Me 3 (2006)
- If You Were Me 4 (2009)
- If You Were Me 5 (2011)
- If You Were Me 6 (2013)
