= Gurung shamanism =

Traditional shamanistic religion in Nepal

Gurung Shamanism is arguably one of the oldest religions in Nepal. It describes the traditional shamanistic religion of the Gurung people of Nepal. There are three priests within the Gurungs which are Pachyu, Khlepree and Bonpo Lama (Pre-Buddhist Lama). Tamus do not have a written script; nowadays they use the Devanagari script. However, the Tamus have created their own script called 'Khema Script' which is taught in Rupandehi, Nepal, and is widely taught even in overseas countries like Sikkim, India. The pronunciation of the word 'Pachyu' and 'Khlepree' are often different from one village to another. Pachyu are sometimes referred to as 'Poju or Pajyu' and Khlepree is also known as 'Lhori or Ghyabri'. Bonpo Lamais the proper term for a Gurung Lama. The "Pachyu" is understood to be the first priest amongst the three priests followed by Khlepree and lastly the Bonpo Lam. Pachyu, Khlepree and Bonpo Lams' recite chants of ancient legends and myths. These sacred myths and legends within the Pe are historical events and stories which dates back to as early as the creation of Earth to stories that have occurred within the Gurung societies as they are one of the indigenous people of Nepal.

== Deprecated terms ==
Gurung shamanism has been often cited in scholarly texts as well as Hindu world of thought as Gurung dharma, but the latter term is considered inaccurate as it is not considered a form of dharma by its adherents, but rather an ancient shamanistic belief system. Among Tamus, it is known as Tamu Cho.

== Description ==
Gurung villages have their own local deities. There are two significant rituals that is carried out amongst the Gurungs which are 'Phailu/Pwelu/' and 'Pae/Arghum'. Phailu/Pwelu is an ancestral worshipping ritual which usually lasts 12 hours and is held yearly or every three years. During a yearly Phailu/Pwelu, Pachyus mostly sacrifice a rooster however if the ritual is carried out every three years a goat must be sacrificed. On the Khlepree's case a goat must be sacrificed. Another ritual which is the known is the funeral. In Gurung language a funeral is called 'Pai' also known as 'Arghum' in Nepali. The funerary rite is the central ceremony, entailing three days and two nights of rituals to send souls to the Land of the Ancestors. These rituals may be officiated by Pachyu and Khlepree or Bonpo Lam (pre-Buddhist Lama). Among the Gurung, death involves the dissolution of bodily elements – earth, air, fire, and water. These elements are released in a series of rituals, nine for men and seven for women. One ritual in the freeing of souls involves a "Klehpree" injecting the spirit of the deceased through a string into a bird, which then appears to recognize family members and otherwise act unnaturally. The bird is symbolically sacrificed with the plucking of a few feathers, received by family members, after which the bird is released. Once in the Land of the Ancestors, life continues much as in this world. incarnations. From the Land of the Ancestors, spirits continue to take an interest in their surviving kinsmen, able to work good and evil in the realm of the living.

According to Gurung Shamanism, the correct method of dealing with a deceased body is burial however, as the Gurung's have migrated to the lower regions many have been influenced by Hindus resulting in cremation. After the burial or cremation, the family of the deceased may constructs a small shrine on a hill to offer food to the spirit, which remains and may cause misfortune. Sons of the deceased observe mourning for six to twelve months, during which they fast from meat and alcohol. A final funerary ceremony takes places a year or more after death, for which an expensive funeral rite is performed. This rite includes an effigy (called a pla) of the deceased, draped in white cloth and decorated with ornaments. The death rituals close as Klehpri addresses the spirit and sends it to its resting place, after which the hilltop shrine is dismantled. Further rites ensue, during which the priest recites supplications to the "spirits of the four directions" for kind treatment as the deceased makes his way to the spirit realm, advises the departing soul on its choice between reincarnation and remaining in the Land of Ancestors, and admonishes it to stay away from its worldly cares and not to return prematurely.

=== Priesthood ===
Gurungs employ three categories of priesthood – Pachyu, Ghyapri and Bonpo Lam (Pre-Buddhist Lama) – each following different practices Unlike Buddhist Lamas, Gurung priests - Pachyu and Ghyabri practice oral literature without relying on text

The Pachyu are believed to communicate with spirits and local deities and are often employed by persons suffering illnesses or misfortunes to draw up horoscopes. Pachyus often operate within their own Gurung villages and communities most notably along the Modi Valley, Nepal. However, today Gurung priests can be found outside Nepal in England, United States and Hong Kong. Most Pachyus and Ghyabris often carry out rituals with those from the same clan. Their practice is largely in the realm of interpreting the supernatural. While their ritual language is also archaic, it is more readily understood by practitioners and laity.

The Ghyabri/ Khlepree are involved with funerary rituals and play drums and large brass cymbals. The ghyabri have no sacred literature, learning all prayers and rituals by heart over several years. These sacred oral scriptures are called Pye tan Lu tan. The sacred language, Gurung-kura, is no longer understood by laity nor practitioners, and may be derived from an ancient religion.

=== Influence of Buddhism ===
Centuries of cultural influence from Tibet resulted in many Gurungs gradually embracing Tibetan Buddhism over the centuries, especially the Nyingma school, and particularly among Gurungs in the Manang region. Gurungs generally believe in Buddha and bodhisattvas. Mainstream Tibetan Buddhist lamas harbor ambivalent opinions about Gurung Dharma (Pye Ta Lu Ta) practices, and syncretic Gurung Dharma may be reluctant to disclose their practices to outsiders.

According to the 2001 Nepal Census, 69.03% of the ethnic Gurung identified as Buddhists, 28.75% as Hindus, and 0.66% as Christians.

== See also ==
- Guru Baaje
- Why Pae/Arghum(Gurung death ritual) continues for three days?
