= Polden Chopang Gurung =

Nepali politician

Polden Chhopang Gurung
- पोल्देन छोपाङ गुरुङ

Member of Parliament, Pratinidhi Sabha
- In office 4 March 2018 – 18 September 2022
- Preceded by: Tek Bahadur Gurung (as Member of the Constituent Assembly)
- Succeeded by: Tek Bahadur Gurung
- Constituency: Manang 1

Personal details
- Born: 16 October 1959 (age 66)
- Party: CPN (UML)

Polden Chhopang Gurung is a Nepali politician, and a member of the House of Representatives of the Federal Parliament of Nepal. He was elected from Manang constituency as a candidate for the Communist Party of Nepal (Unified Marxist-Leninist) (CPN UML), defeating his closest rival, Tek Bahadur Gurung of Nepali Congress, by 2,300 votes to 2,021. He is an apple farmer by profession. CPN UML's district chairperson for Manang, Gurung became the party's candidate after Dipak Manange, whom the party was supporting, withdrew his candidacy. Gurung won in the constituency with a previously very weak presence of CPN UML; the party's candidate had received 70 votes in the previous election.
