= Dhananjaya Regmi =

Nepalese Politician

Dhananjay Regmi
- धनञ्जय रेग्मी

Member of Parliament, Pratinidhi Sabha
- Elected
- Assumed office 27 March 2026
- Preceded by: Raju Thapa
- Constituency: Syangja 1

CEO of Nepal Tourism Board
- In office 28 January 2020 – 28 January 2024
- Succeeded by: Deepak Raj Joshi

Personal details
- Citizenship: Nepalese
- Party: Rastriya Swatantra Party
- Education: Environmental Earth Sciences (Ph.D.) from Hokkaido University
- Profession: Politician

Dhananjaya Regmi (Note: Nepali: धनञ्जय रेग्मी) is a Nepalese politician serving as a member of parliament from the Rastriya Swatantra Party. He is the member of the 3rd Federal Parliament of Nepal elected from Syangja 1 constituency in 2026 Nepalese General Election securing 29,071 votes and defeating the nearest rival Bharat Raj Dhakal of the Nepali Congress. He was the former CEO of Nepal Tourism Board.

He is also a mountain geomorphologist and glaciologist who worked as a Post-Doctoral Research Fellow for the Global Land Project at the NODAL office in Sapporo, Japan and as an adjunct professor in the Central Department of Geography and Environmental Science at Tribhuvan University.

== Honors ==
He was honoured with Pacific Asia Travel Association special awards during his tenure at Nepal Tourism Board for doing commendable work in Nepal Tourism sector during the time of COVID-19 Pandemic.

== Personal life ==
Regmi is married to Sabina Devkota and has two sons.
