= Ayo Gorkhali =

2020 non-fiction book by Tim Gurung

Ayo Gorkhali: A History of the Gurkhas
- Author: Tim Gurung
- Subject: Gurkhas
- Publisher: Westland Books
- Publication date: 2020
- Publication place: Nepal
- Pages: 320
- ISBN: 978-93-89648-70-6

Ayo Gorkhali: A History of the Gurkhas is a 2020 book by Nepalese author Tim Gurung. The book contains the history of Gurkhas. Ayo Gorkhali: A History of the Gurkhas received positive feedback from critics.
