= Hemant Gurung =

Bhutanese politician

Member of the National Assembly of Bhutan
- Incumbent
- Assumed office 31 October 2018
- Preceded by: Ngeema Sangay Tshempo
- Constituency: Lhamoi Dzingkha Tashiding
- In office 2008–2013
- Succeeded by: Ngeema Sangay Tshempo
- Constituency: Lhamoi Dzingkha Tashiding

Personal details
- Born: c. 1958
- Party: Druk Nyamrup Tshogpa (DNT)
- Education: Jawaharlal Nehru University

Military service
- Allegiance: Bhutan
- Branch/service: Royal Bhutan Police; Royal Bhutan Army

Hemant Gurung is a Bhutanese politician who has been a member of the National Assembly of Bhutan, since October 2018. Previously, he was a member of the National Assembly of Bhutan from 2008 to 2013.

== Education ==
He earned a Bachelor of Arts degree from Jawaharlal Nehru University, India.

== Political career ==
Gurung was elected to the National Assembly of Bhutan as a candidate of Druk Phuensum Tshogpa (DPT) from Lhamoi Dzingkha Tashiding constituency in 2008 Bhutanese National Assembly election.

He later left DPT to join Druk Nyamrup Tshogpa and was elected for the second time to the National Assembly of Bhutan from Constituency Lhamoi Dzingkha Tashiding in 2018 Bhutanese National Assembly election. He received 6,257 votes, defeating Prem Kumar Khatiwara, a candidate of DPT.
