= Chandra Kumari Gurung =

Nepali migrant worker

Chandra Kumari Gurung is a former Nepali migrant worker in South Korea who in November 1993 was mistaken to be mentally ill and incarcerated in a South Korean psychiatric hospital for six years and four months.

== Confinement and release ==
When she was arrested after failing to pay for a meal, Gurung tried to explain—despite her limited command of the Korean language—that she had accidentally left her wallet with money and identification at the factory where she worked. Due to police negligence and a series of professional misconduct, Gurung was taken into custody, wrongly diagnosed as a schizophrenic, and subjected to years of physical restraint, forced medication, and solitary confinement. She was eventually recognised as a Nepali woman and released in April 2000. She returned to her home in Mt. Annapurna in Nepal.

== Lawsuit and media attention ==
Gurung later filed a lawsuit to demand compensation for her unjust incarceration and a formal apology from the South Korean government. The court awarded her approximately US$23,500.

Her story gained notoriety and news coverage and was the subject of a short film titled "N. E. P. A. L. Never Ending Peace And Love" by Park Chan-wook as part of a 2003 omnibus film, If You Were Me (Korean title: 여섯 개의 시선), produced by the National Human Rights Commission of Korea.
