= 2022 Rajbiraj municipal election =

City elections in Rajbiraj, Nepal

2022 Rajbiraj municipal elections
- 13 May 2022

85 seats to Rajbiraj Municipal City Council 43 seats needed for a majority
- Turnout: 72.65% (▼0.20 pp)

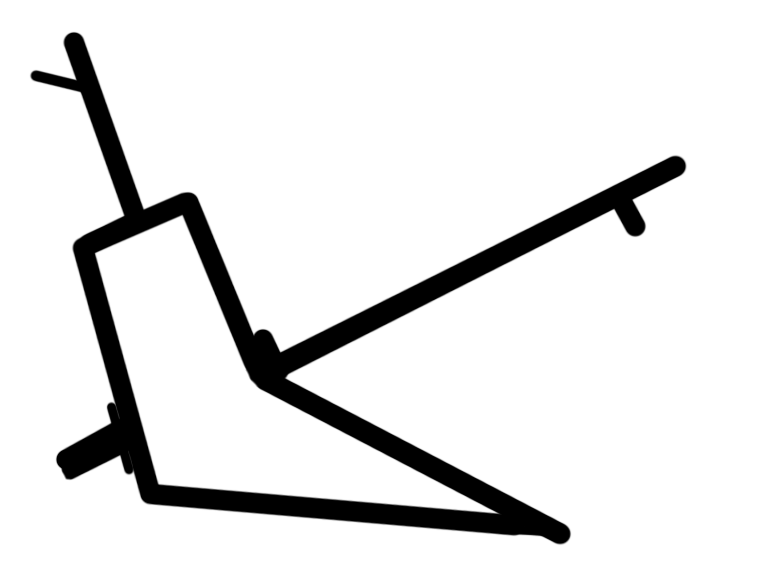
	First party	Second party	Third party
Leader	Bhimraj Yadav	Irshad Ansari	Shambhu Prasad Yadav
Party	PSP-Nepal	Nepali Congress	Maoist Centre
Seats before	0	10	12
Seats won	36	14	11
Seat change	▲36	▲4	▼1
Percentage	43.90%	17.07%	13.41%
	Fourth party	Fifth party	Sixth party
Leader	Dipendra Chaudhary	Nathuni Das	Umesh Prasad Sah
Party	Loktantrik Samajwadi	Unified Socialist	RPP
Seats before	0	0	0
Seats won	9	5	4
Seat change	▲9	▲5	▲4
Percentage	10.97%	6.09%	4.87%
- Summary of Partywise Ward chairperson won, 2022
Mayor before election
Shambhu Prasad Yadav
Maoist Centre
Elected Mayor
Bhimraj Yadav
PSP-Nepal

The 2022 Municipal election for Rajbiraj was held on 13 May 2022 to elect a mayor, a deputy mayor, sixteen ward chairperson and ward members. All positions were elected for a term of five years. A secondary election was held for the municipal executives which elected five women from the elected ward members and three members from the Dalit and minority community. The electorate for this election was for the 82 members chosen by direct election. Janata Samajwadi Party mayoral candidate Bhimraj Yadav was elected as a Mayor of Rajbiraj by securing 9,624 votes.

== Background ==
The last local level elections were held in 2017. With the passing of a new constitution in 2015, a commission was formed to restructure the existing local levels into more powerful and autonomous local bodies. The city limits of Rajbiraj were changed during this restructuring and the number of wards was increased from 10 to 16. Electors in each ward will elect a ward chairperson and 4 ward members. Out of 4 ward members, 2 must be female and one of the 2 females must belong to the Dalit community.

== Voters ==
Election Commission of Nepal is the responsible body to update and publish the final electoral rolls before the election in Nepal. The election commission had published the final voter list for the local level election on March 27. There is a total of 39,692 registered voters who can cast their vote in Rajbiraj municipal election. The Ward wise electoral details for the 2022 Rajbiraj municipal election:

Ward wise electoral details
No.	Ward No.	Men	Women	Third gender	Total
1.	Ward No. 1	2017	1731	2	3750
2.	Ward No. 2	1309	1213	0	2522
3.	Ward No. 3	819	691	0	1510
4.	Ward No. 4	1164	988	0	2152
5.	Ward No. 5	932	858	0	1790
6.	Ward No. 6	1966	1767	0	3733
7.	Ward No. 7	1736	1560	0	3296
8.	Ward No. 8	1084	1087	0	2171
9.	Ward No. 9	2118	1746	0	3864
10.	Ward No. 10	1494	1306	0	2800
11.	Ward No. 11	1239	1035	0	2274
12.	Ward No. 12	1153	934	0	2087
13.	Ward No. 13	1285	1130	0	2415
14.	Ward No. 14	829	727	0	1556
15.	Ward No. 15	1071	930	0	2001
16.	Ward No. 16	854	817	0	1771
Male					21170
Female					18520
Other					2
Total Voters					39692

== Election schedule ==
On March 24, the Election commission of Nepal announced the election schedule for the local election.

S.N.	Activities	Date
1	Candidate nomination registration	2022 April 24-25
2	Publication of nominated candidate list	2022 April 25
3	Complaining against a candidate	2022 April 26
4	Scrutiny of nomination	2022 April 27-28
5	Last Date for Withdrawal of nomination	2022 April 28
6	Publication of final candidate list	2022 April 29
7	Provide election symbols to candidates	2022 April 30
8	Election day	2022 May 13
Date of Counting of Votes		Immediately after completion of election
Source: Election Commission of Nepal

== Candidates ==
=== Mayor Candidates ===
==== Shambhu Prasad Yadav ====
Shambhu Prasad Yadav, the Mayor of Rajbiraj Municipilaty was elected in 2017. He was elected as a Mayor in local level elections from Rastriya Janata Party Nepal. After the merger of political parties, he joined People's Socialist Party, Nepal in 2020. He is now contesting for the Mayor's candidacy from Communist Party of Nepal (Maoist Centre) after resigning from his mayoral post.

==== Bhimraj Yadav ====
Bhimraj Yadav is the candidate from People's Socialist Party, Nepal. He was previously contested for the Mayor candidacy in 2017 local level election from Federal Socialist Forum, Nepal and lost by 15 votes. He was previously associated with Federation Of Contractors' Associations, Saptari.

=== Candidates list (Mayor and Deputy Mayor) ===
Key	Description
♔	denotes former Mayor
♕	denotes former Deputy Mayor

No.	Party	Flag	Symbol	Mayor candidate	Photo	Deputy Mayor candidate	Photo
1.	CPN-MC			Shambhu Prasad Yadav		Pramila Kumari Sah	
2.	PSP-N			Bhimraj Yadav		Ishrat Praveen	
3.	Nepali Congress			Irshad Ansari		Sushila Yadav	
4.	LSP-N			Dipendra Chaudhary		Sadhana Jha	
5.	Janamat Party			Mamata Jha		Sadhana Das	
6.	CPN-US			Nathuni Das		Mamata Chaudhary	
7.	CPN-UML			Anil Jha		Sashita Kumari Dev	
8.	Rastriya Prajatantra Party			Umesh Prasad Sah		Sarita Jha	
9.	Terai Madhesh Loktantrik Party			Bhupendra Yadav		Bimala Devi Chaudhary	

=== Candidate list (Ward Chairperson) ===
Key	Description
♔	denotes former Ward Chairperson

Party	Symbol	Ward Number (1-8)							
Party	Symbol	1	2	3	4	5	6	7	8
CPN-MC		Gangaram Yadav	Chandan Kumar Yadav	Md. Irshad Ahmad	Akhtar Ali Miya	Sanjay Kumar Das	Prem Kumar Yadav	Subhash Chandra Yadav	Jay Narayan Mandal
PSP-N		Chandra Shekhar Chaudhary	Arun Kumar Yadav	Anil Kumar Das	Dinesh Kumar Sah	Bandhu Lal Das	Shiv Kumar Sah	Santosh Prasad Sah	Dev Narayan Gurmaita
Nepali Congress		Anand Kumar Jha	Shambhu Lal Dev	Ranjit Chaudhary	Prabhat Kumar Lalan	Samir Kumar Jha	Raj Kumar Chaudhary	Ghanshyam Sah	Kaushal Kumar Das
LSP-N		Satish Kumar Jha	Lalit Narayan Jha	Furqan Ahmed Khan	Ramasish Prasad Sah	Lalan Mishra	Sashi Kumar Chaudhary	Bijay Kumar Dev	Digambar Lal Sah
Janamat Party		Sandip Sharma	Sujit Kumar Mandal	-	Roshan Ansari	Roshan Bajpayee	Prakash Kumar Chaudhary	Manju Devi Sah	-
CPN-US		Rajesh Kumar Chaudhary	Shivnath Das	-	Dambar Narayan Das	Ramchandra Sah	Rajesh Kumar Chaudhary	Akhilesh Kumar Dev	Satish Kumar Dutta
CPN-UML		Kalim Miya	Dipendra Kumar Yadav	Md. Mukhtar	Mukhtar Aalam	Sanjiv Das	Dipak Kumar Das	Tribhuvan Yadav	Sunil Kumar Pariyar
Independent				Sudarshan Prasad Singh				Mangi Lal Nai	
Party	Symbol	Ward Number (9-16)							
Party	Symbol	9	10	11	12	13	14	15	16
CPN-MC		Shambhu Prasad Yadav	Gangaram Khang	Sanjay Kumar Yadav	Gopi Krishna Yadav	Yogendra Yadav	Upendra Sada	Santosh Kumar Yadav	Shailendra Kumar Dev
PSP-N		Jawahar Yadav	Sushil Kumar Das	Udit Narayan Yadav	Sanjiv Kumar Yadav	Bishnudev Yadav	Shobha Lal Mandal	Ram Prasad Yadav	Ram Akbal Yadav
Nepali Congress		Pradip Kumar Yadav	Rundi Yadav	Amarnath Yadav	Harihar Yadav	Suryanarayan Prasad Yadav	Satya Narayan Mandal	Umesh Prasad Yadav	Narendra Prasad Dev
LSP-N		Sitaram Yadav	Bishnu Kumar Rohita	Mahesh Prasad Sah	Anil Kumar Yadav	Jag Narayan Yadav	Magain Mandal	Om Narayan Sah	Buchai Das
Janamat Party		Tarakant Yadav	Mahendra Yadav	Sachhidanand Yadav	Pramod Kumar Rajak	Rajendra Prasad Yadav	Hare Krishna Mandal	Ram Babu Yadav	Gajendra Prasad Yadav
CPN-US		Chhote Lal Yadav	-	Rajendra Prasad Yadav	Ramchandra Yadav	Sukdev Yadav	-	Dalluram Mochi	Mahendra Prasad Dev
CPN-UML		Md. Jamir Ali	Bhupendra Prasad Yadav	Upendra Prasad Yadav	Satya Narayan Yadav	Bhupendra Yadav	Jagadish Mandal	Balram Yadav	Shivram Das

== Voters turnout ==
The Election commission of Nepal has scheduled the polling time from early 7:00 am NST to 17:00 pm NST on 13 May 2022. There are total 27 polling stations and 52 voting booths in Rajbiraj municipal election.

Ward No.	Polling stations						Total Voters	Turnout	Turnout (%)
Ward No.	Name	Voters	Name	Voters	Name	Voters			
Ward No. 1	Devkota School, Chanaura	2361	Primary School, Dumari			1389	3750	2900	77.44%
Ward No. 2	Primary School, Rajdevi					2522	2522	1597	63.32%
Ward No. 3	Kesho Anirudhhawati Secondary School					1510	1510	943	62.45%
Ward No. 4	Primary School, Centre No. 6					2152	2152	1521	70.71%
Ward No. 5	Public Bindeshwari School, Swarna Tole					1790	1790	1230	68.71%
Ward No. 6	Primary School, Thangachhi	1852	Bahira Baalak School			1881	3733	2616	70.07%
Ward No. 7	District Sports Office	1430	Primary School, Kharsal			1866	3296	2130	64.67%
Ward No. 8	Gharelu Office					2171	2171	1368	63.01%
Ward No. 9	Ward Office	1531	Primary School, Gadhiya	995	Healthpost Bhawan	1338	3864	2993	77.46%
Ward No. 10	Janak School, Biraul	1111	Primary School, Dighwa	1358	Primary School, Maitgadhi	331	2800	2190	78.60%
Ward No. 11	Primary School, Jhalahi	1402	Primary School, Pharseth			872	2274	1833	80.60%
Ward No. 12	Ward Office, Bisahariya					2087	2087	1789	78.82%
Ward No. 13	Mahabir School, Bisahariya	1418	Primary School, Bhelahi Piparahi			997	2415	1829	75.23%
Ward No. 14	Primary School, Parsahi					1556	1556	1235	79.36%
Ward No. 15	Basic School, Deuri	895	Janata Basic School, Musaharniya			1106	2001	1557	78.01%
Ward No. 16	Ward Office, Boriya	1311	Narendra Memorial School			460	1771	1341	75.58%
Total							39692	28682	72.65%
The number of total voters of Rajbiraj Municipality is updated on 27 March 2022.

Election day gallery

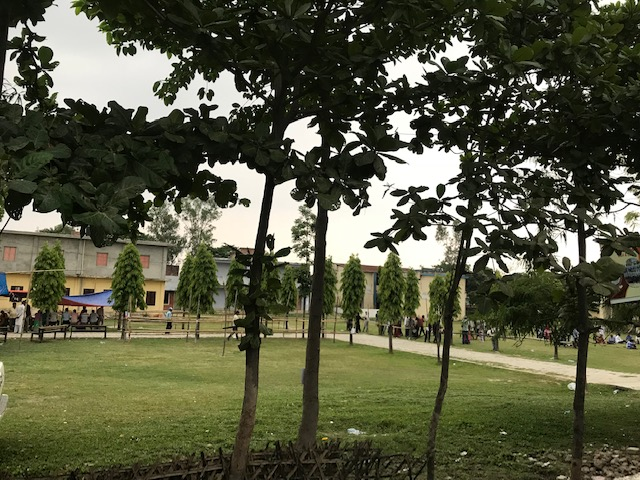
Polling booth

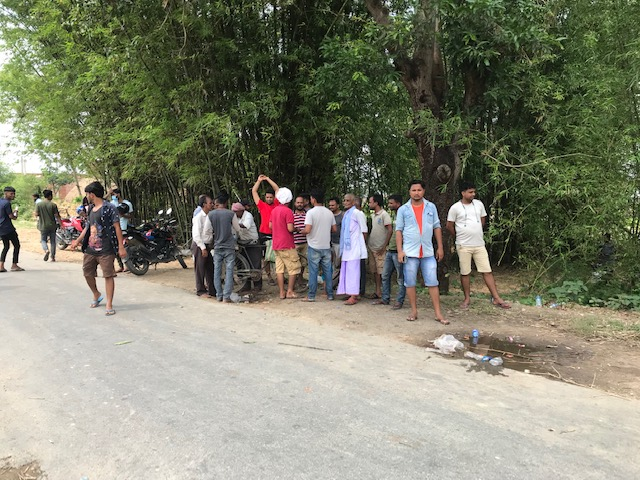
Peoples outside the polling booth

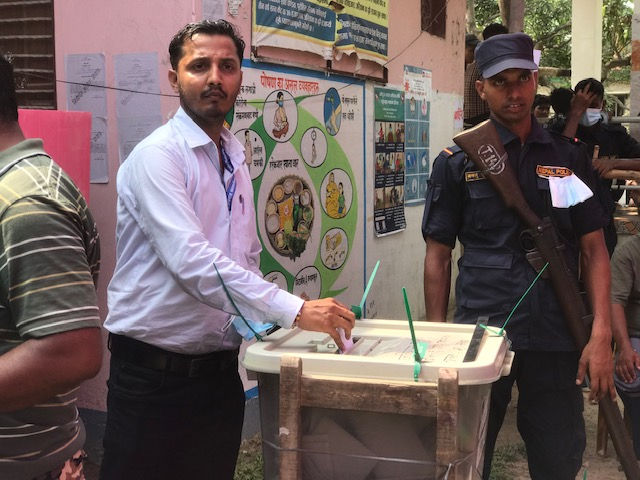
Voter

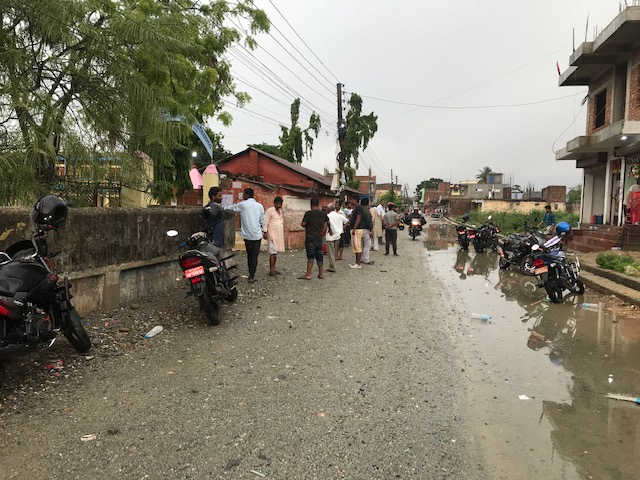
People outside the polling booth

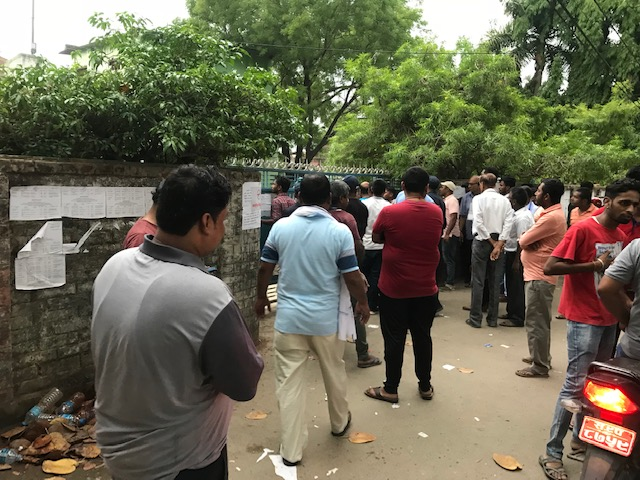
A view of the polling booth

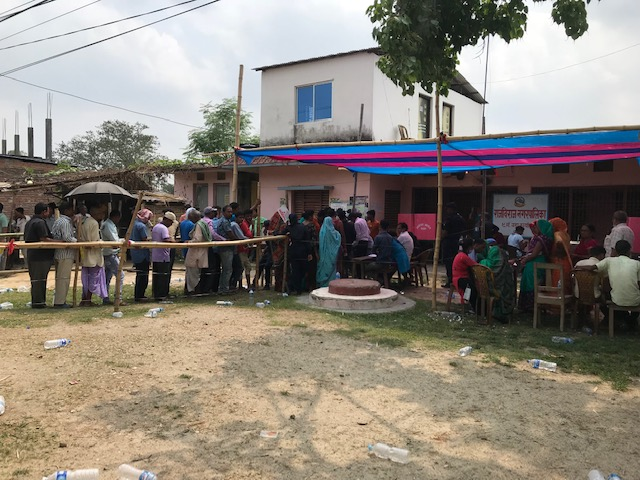
Voters are in queue

== Results ==
=== Mayoral election ===
Mayoral elections result
Party	Candidate	Votes	%	±%
PSP-Nepal	Bhimraj Yadav	9,624	37.6%	+13.79%
Maoist Centre	Shambhu Prasad Yadav	4,807	18.7%	−5.18%
Congress	Irshad Ansari	4,576	17.8%	New
Loktantrik Samajwadi	Dipendra Kumar Chaudhary	2,437	9.5%	New
Unified Socialist	Nathuni Das	1,322	5.1%	New
CPN (UML)	Anil Jha	1,288	5.0%	New
Janamat	Mamata Jha	922	3.6%	New
RPP	Umesh Prasad Sah	358	1.3%	New
T-MLP	Bhupendra Yadav	107	0.4%	New
Others		153	0.5%	
Total votes		25,594	100.0%	
PSP-Nepal hold				

=== Deputy-Mayoral election ===
Deputy mayoral elections result
Party	Candidate	Votes	%	±%
PSP-Nepal	Ishrat Parvin	7,264	30.1%	New
Congress	Sushila Kumari Yadav	4,427	18.3%	+7.4
Maoist Centre	Pramila Kumari Sah	4,250	17.6%	New
Loktantrik Samajwadi	Sadhana Jha	3,206	13.3%	−14.3%
CPN (UML)	Sashila Kumari Dev	1,968	8.1%	New
Janamat	Sadhana Das	1,203	4.9%	New
Unified Socialist	Mamata Chaudhary	1,116	4.6%	−10.7
RPP	Sarita Jha	386	1.6%	New
T-MLP	Bimala Devi Chaudhary	139	0.5%	New
Total votes		23,959	100.0%	
PSP-Nepal hold				

== Ward results ==
Party	Chairman	Members
People's Socialist Party, Nepal	8	26
CPN(Maoist Centre)	3	8
Loktantrik Samajwadi Party, Nepal	2	7
Communist Party of Nepal (UML)	1	1
Communist Party of Nepal (Unified Socialist)	1	4
Rastriya Prajatantra Party	1	3
Nepali Congress	0	14
Independent	0	1
Total	16	64

=== Ward wise electoral details ===
No.	Ward No.	Ward Chairman	Political Party
1.	Ward No. 1	Chandra Shekhar Chaudhary	People's Socialist Party, Nepal
2.	Ward No. 2	Arun Kumar Yadav	People's Socialist Party, Nepal
3.	Ward No. 3	Anil Kumar Das 'Guddu'	People's Socialist Party, Nepal
4.	Ward No. 4	Dinesh Kumar Sah (Kasera)	People's Socialist Party, Nepal
5.	Ward No. 5	Bandhu Das	People's Socialist Party, Nepal
6.	Ward No. 6	Sashi Kumar Chaudhary	LSP-N
7.	Ward No. 7	Shubhash Chandra Yadav	CPN(MC)
8.	Ward No. 8	Jay Narayan Mandal	CPN(MC)
9.	Ward No. 9	Jawahar Yadav	People's Socialist Party, Nepal
10.	Ward No. 10	Gangaram Khang	CPN(MC)
11.	Ward No. 11	Udit Narayan Yadav	People's Socialist Party, Nepal
12.	Ward No. 12	Ramchandra Yadav	Communist Party of Nepal (Unified Socialist)
13.	Ward No. 13	Trilokinath Chaudhary	Rastriya Prajatantra Party
14.	Ward No. 14	Jagadish Mandal	Communist Party of Nepal (Unified Marxist-Leninist)
15.	Ward No. 15	Om Narayan Sah	LSP-N
16.	Ward No. 16	Ram Akwal Yadav	People's Socialist Party, Nepal

=== Summary of results by ward ===
Position	1	2	3	4	5	6	7	8	9	10	11	12	13	14	15	16
Ward Chairman																
Ward Member 1																
Ward Member 2																
Female Member																
Female Dalit Member																
Source: Election Commission

== Results for municipal executive election ==
The municipal executive consists of the mayor, who is also the chair of the municipal executive, the deputy mayor and ward chairs from each ward. The members of the municipal assembly elected five female members and three members from the Dalit or minority community to the municipal executive using single non-transferable vote.

=== Municipal Assembly composition ===
Party	Members
People's Socialist Party, Nepal	36
Nepali Congress	14
CPN (Maoist Centre)	11
Loktantrik Samajwadi Party, Nepal	9
CPN (Unified Socialist)	5
Rastriya Prajatantra Party	4
CPN (Unified Marxist–Leninist)	2
Independent	1
Total	82

=== Results ===
Category	Candidate	Party	Votes
Female Member	Rekha Devi Mandal	People's Socialist Party, Nepal	Unopposed
Female Member	Ghurani Devi Rajak Safi	People's Socialist Party, Nepal	Unopposed
Female Member	Manju Kumari Khadka Rajak	People's Socialist Party, Nepal	Unopposed
Female Member	Lalita Devi Karn	Nepali Congress	Unopposed
Female Member	Soni Kumari Rajak	Nepali Congress	Unopposed
Dalit/Minority Member	Md. Iliyas Miya	People's Socialist Party, Nepal	
Dalit/Minority Member	Manoj Kumar Sah	People's Socialist Party, Nepal	
Dalit/Minority Member	Md. Basir	People's Socialist Party, Nepal	
Dalit/Minority Member	Kedar Dev	CPN (Maoist Centre)	
Dalit/Minority Member	Dhirendra Verma	CPN (Unified Marxist–Leninist)	

=== Municipal Executive composition ===
Party	Members	+/–
People's Socialist Party, Nepal	16	New
CPN (Maoist Centre)	3	▼1
Nepali Congress	2	▲1
Loktantrik Samajwadi Party	2	New
CPN (Unified Marxist–Leninist)	1	▲1
CPN (Unified Socialist)	1	New
Rastriya Prajatantra Party	1	▲1
Total	26	0

== See also ==
- 2022 Nepalese local elections
- 2022 Lalitpur municipal election
- 2017 Kathmandu municipal election
- 2022 Janakpur municipal election
- 2022 Bharatpur municipal election
