= Pratima Gurung =

Nepali human rights activist (born 1978)

- प्रतिमा गुरुङ
- Born: 1978 (age 47–48); Pokhara, Nepal
- Known for: Human rights activism

Pratima Gurung (Nepali: प्रतिमा गुरुङ; born 1978) is a Nepalese human rights activist. A member of the Gurung people, she is known for her advocacy for the rights of both indigenous people and people with disabilities, particularly in response to climate change.

== Personal life ==
Gurung was born in Pokhara, Nepal in 1978, the eldest child born to Jamuna Kumari Gurung and Purna Bahadur Gurung. Gurung was raised in a Gurung family. At the age of seven, Gurung became disabled when she was involved in a car accident; one of her hands had to be amputated, and she experienced physical limitations as a result of her injuries.

Encouraged by her parents to access education, Gurung completed her undergraduate studies in Siddharthanagar. In 2001, she began studying for a master's degree in English from Pokhara University. Following this, Gurung became a faculty member at Padma Kanya Multiple Campus, a women's college within Tribhuvan University in Kathmandu.

In 2010, Gurung married Takraj Gurung, a Nepali Congress politician who represented Lamjung in the provincial government of Gandaki Province.

== Activism ==
=== National activism ===
Gurung has campaigned for the rights of indigenous women with disabilities, advocating for them to be seen as decision-makers both in Nepal and more widely in Asia, as opposed to having decisions made on their behalf. A proponent of an intersectional approach to human rights, citing the "multiple marginalised identities" of disabled indigenous women, Gurung has called for the voices of indigenous women to be amplified within disability forums, and in turn for the voices of disabled women to be amplified in indigenous forums.

Gurung is known for her work on the impact of climate change on vulnerable communities in Nepal, including indigenous people and people with disabilities. Following a series of natural disasters in the country, including the April 2015 earthquake and the COVID-19 pandemic, Gurung accused the Nepali government of failing to alter its communication on disaster relief, citing barriers facing communities such as illiteracy or not speaking Nepali or English, meaning people are unable to read, follow or understand advice that is given to ensure their safety and wellbeing. She has also called for disaster relief services to be made more accessible, citing bureaucratic online procedures in place to request support alongside the low technical abilities of many indigenous and disabled people in Nepal. As a result of her activism, Gurung has worked as an advisor for Nepal's Ministry of Women, Children and Senior Citizens.

Gurung served as the general secretary of the Nepal Indigenous Disabled Association. She later co-founded and served as the chairperson of the National Indigenous Disabled Women Association Nepal, an organisation in Nepal founded and led by indigenous women with disabilities.

=== International activism ===
Gurung is a member of the steering committee of the Indigenous Persons with Disabilities Global Network, as well as its general secretary. The organisation campaigns for the implementation of the Convention on the Rights of Persons with Disabilities and the Declaration on the Rights of Indigenous Peoples. Internationally, Gurung has called on the United Nations to recognise people with disabilities as one of its constituencies, which would allow disability advocacy groups to partake in intergovernmental organisations. In 2017, Gurung spoke at the 61st session of the Commission on the Status of Women at the United Nations headquarters in New York City, United States, on the empowerment of indigenous women.

Additionally, Gurung has spoken in 2022 before the United Nations Office for Disaster Risk Reduction on the topic of the impact of climate change-related disasters, as well as the COVID-19 pandemic, on vulnerable groups in Nepal. She received the Rising Star Women's International Network for Disaster Risk Reduction Leadership Award in recognition of her work contributing to the understanding, prevention, and reduction of risks associated with disasters on indigenous and disabled people.

Gurung attended the 2022 United Nations Climate Change Conference, where she sought to highlight the vulnerabilities of disabled people to climate change, which she felt was missing from the conference's agenda. She stated at the event "we are just trying to get on the agenda".

In 2023, Gurung received the Human Rights and Environment Award from Antonio Gutierres, the Secretary-General of the United Nations..

In 2024, Gurung entitled a chapter, "Reframing the narratives of Indigenous person with disabilities and creating inclusive spaces through advocacy", into the book Indigenous Disability Studies, edited by John T. Ward and published by Routledge. In 2025, she contributed an article, "The fight for visibility of diverse women with diverse disabilities throughout the three decades since the Beijing Conference", in the journal Gender & Development.
