= Sarita Gurung =

Nepalese philanthropist

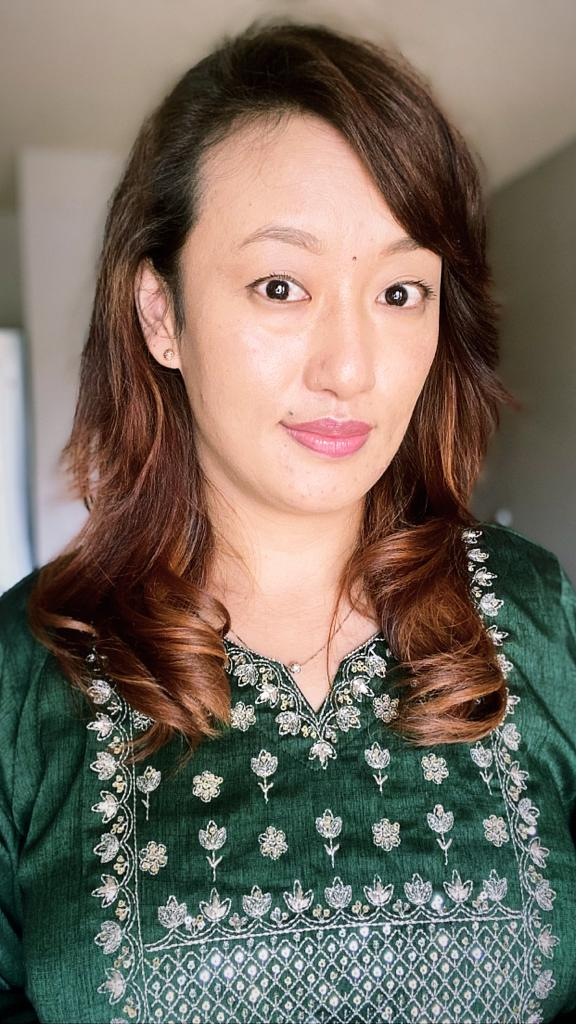
Nepalese social worker Sarita Gurung (सरीता गुरुङ्ग)

Sarita Gurung (SAH-ree-tah GUU-rung, Nepali: सरीता गुरुङ्ग) is a philanthropist and social worker from Nepal who collects funds privately via the Facebook social network and donates to needy people.

She was the first social campaigner from Nepal to utilize Facebook and Twitter for social causes. Born in Dhikur Pokhari, and formerly living in Pokhara, she is currently living in the U.S. state of Colorado.

She has been involved in rescue and relief work for those who have not been able to obtain medical care, education, or housing due to financial constraints. She has worked with the Nepal-based National Innovation Centre, run by Mahabir Pun.
