= Tim Gurung =

Nepalese writer

Tim Gurung (Nepali: टिम गुरुङ) is a Nepalese writer. Prior to taking on a career in writing, he served with the British Armed Forces as a Nepalese Gurkha.

He was born in Dhampus, Kaski District, Gandaki Province, Nepal.

== Works ==
- Ayo Gorkhali: A History of the Gurkhas. Westland Publications Private Limited. 2020. ISBN 978-93-89648-70-6.
- Ayo Gorkhali: The True Story of the Gurkhas. Blacksmith Books. 17 May 2021. ISBN 978-988-79639-0-5.
