= Raju Thapa =

Nepalese politician

Honourable Raju Thapa
- राजु थापा

Member of the Pratinidhi Sabha
- In office 22 December 2022 – 12 September 2025
- Succeeded by: Dhananjaya Regmi
- Constituency: Syangja 1

Personal details
- Born: 26 October 1978 (age 47)
- Party: Nepali Congress
- Education: Tribhuwan University

Raju Thapa is a Nepalese politician, belonging to the Nepali Congress and Member of the Pratinidhi Sabha from Syangja 1 (constituency).
