= Dev Gurung =

Nepali politician

Dev Prasad Gurung
- देव प्रसाद गुरुङ

General Secretary of Communist Party of Nepal (Maoist Centre)
- Incumbent
- Assumed office 2022
- Leader: Pushpa Kamal Dahal
- Preceded by: Ram Bahadur Thapa

Minister of Law, Justice and Parliamentary Affairs
- In office 2008–2009
- President: Ram Baran Yadav
- Prime Minister: Pushpa Kamal Dahal
- Preceded by: Narendra Bikram Nembang
- Succeeded by: Prem Bahadur Singh

Member of Parliament, Pratinidhi Sabha
- Incumbent
- Assumed office 4 March 2018
- Preceded by: Jamindraman Ghale
- Constituency: Lamjung 1

Member of Constituent Assembly
- In office 28 May 2008 – 28 May 2012
- Preceded by: Palten Gurung
- Succeeded by: Tek Bahadur Gurung
- Constituency: Manang 1

Personal details
- Born: 8 October 1958 (age 67) Manang District
- Party: CPN (Maoist Centre)
- Other political affiliations: CPN (Mashal)

Dev Gurung (Nepali: देव गुरुङ; born 8 October 1958) is a Nepalese politician, belonging to the Communist Party of Nepal (Maoist). Gurung became Minister of Law and Justice on 22 August 2008. And on 20 August 2022 he became General Secretary of Communist party of Nepal (Maoist) In 2002, B.S., Gurung became the president of the All Nepal National Free Students Union.

== Political career ==
After the party had declared People's War in 1996, Gurung was arrested. Following the arrest, the party killed a village committee chairman in Gorkha district, accusing him of responsibility for the capture of Gurung.

Gurung was released by the state, in exchange for a police officer, Thule Rai, who had been captured by the Maoists. During the last phases of the war, Gurung formed part of the Maoist talks team during peace negotiations.

After the fall of King Gyanendra's direct rule in 2006, Gurung was nominated to the interim legislature of Nepal. Gurung became the deputy leader of the Maoist legislative group.

In December 2006, the CPN (M) leadership was reorganized. Gurung was included in the 11-member central secretariat of the party. Gurung was assigned to lead the ethnic front work of the party.

When the Maoists joined the government in April 2007, Gurung was included as Minister for Local Development. Along with the rest of the Maoist ministers, he resigned from his position in September 2007. In December 2007, the Maoists rejoined the government, and Gurung again became Minister for Local Development.

In April 2008, he won the Manang seat in the Constituent Assembly election, defeating the sitting Nepali Congress MP Palten Gurung. Dev Gurung received 1,652 votes, whereas Palten Gurung attracted 1,209 votes. The CPN (UML) candidate in the constituency, Mangal Gurung, had withdrawn his candidature to enable the victory of Dev Gurung. After extended power-sharing discussions between parties, Gurung was appointed as Minister of Law and Justice in a Cabinet headed by CPN (M) Chairman Prachanda and sworn in on 22 August 2008.
