= Melawa Devi =

Nepali singer

- Born: Melawa Devi Gurung; Rumjatar, Okhaldhunga
- Occupations: Singer, Songwriter

Melawa Devi Gurung was a Nepali singer who is best known for being the first female singer from Nepal. In 1928, Devi recorded songs in Calcutta, British India and became known after recording "Na Gharlai Ghar Kahincha Nari Nai Durbar Ho". She also used to sing songs for Chandra Shumsher Jung Bahadur Rana, Prime Minister of Nepal. when chandra Shmsher free all House Servent in Nepa She decided to leave the Raana Palace and start leaving with Her Guru Pandit Krishna.
