= Suvash Gurung =

Nepalese footballer

Personal information
- Date of birth: 7 September 1991 (age 35)
- Place of birth: Waling, Syangja, Nepal
- Position: Midfielder

Team information
- Current team: Sankata Boys S.C.

Senior career*
Years	Team	Apps	(Gls)
2015	Sankata Boys S.C.		

International career
2019	Nepal	2	(0)
- * Club domestic league appearances and goals

Suvash Gurung (born 7 September 1991), also known as Subash Gurung, is a Nepalese professional footballer who plays as a midfielder for Martyr's Memorial A-Division League club Sankata Boys S.C. and the Nepal national team. He made his international debut against Kuwait on 19 November 2019 in FIFA World Cup qualification match held in Thimphu.
