= Omi Gurung =

Indian fashion designer

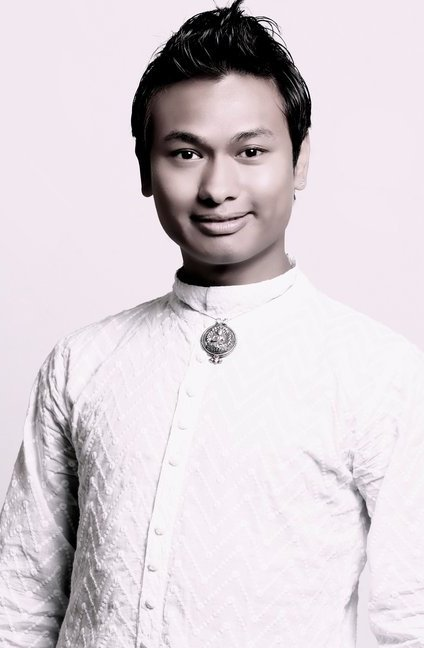
- Omi Gurung
- Born: Sandeep Gurung; Sikkim, India
- Occupations: Fashion designer, social entrepreneur
- Website: omigurung.com

Omi Gurung (born Sandeep Gurung), is an Indian fashion designer and social entrepreneur from Sikkim. He is popularly known as "The Green Man" of Sikkim. He is one of the famous personalities of Sikkim. He has been named among the 15 most powerful and influential people in India’s Northeast for 2026 by India Today NE. Omi Gurung was conferred with Shri N.J Yasaswy Memorial Award 2026 on the birth anniversary of the founder of the ICFAI Group, N.J Yasaswy in recognition of outstanding contribution to entrepreneurship and innovation, and for inspiring excellence, creativity and entrepreneurial spirit.

== Biography ==
Gurung was born and brought up in Sikkim. He is the youngest son of R.K. Gurung, former Secretary of the Department of Mines, Minerals & Geology in the Government of Sikkim, and Beena Gurung.

Omi Gurung is the youth ambassador for EARTHDAY.ORG. Originating from the first Earth Day in 1970, EARTHDAY.ORG works with more than 150,000 partners in over 192 countries on environmental initiatives.

Omi Gurung is a Swachhata Ambassador from Sikkim under the Swachh Bharat Mission, SBM Urban 2.0.

Omi Gurung was one of the 50 voices of young environmentalists from South Asia and Southeast Asia in a global campaign called "My Future, My Voice" which marked the 50th Anniversary of Earth Day on 22 April 2020. Omi was featured as one of the "Defenders of the Planet Earth" in the 12th-anniversary issue (November 2018) of Eclectic Northeast and featured on the cover page of Northeast Today (January 2018) as one of the "Reigning Champions".

Omi Gurung was listed as one of the top seven well-known personalities from Sikkim in the book "Discover India- State by State" published (2018) by Penguin Books. He was also listed as one of the 50 Himalayan Heroes (Coolest People to Know in Asia) by Conde Nast Traveller India in its 7th Anniversary Issue (October–November 2017).

Omi was a global climate consultant for the award-winning animated film “Songs Of The Earth”. The film premiered on 2 November 2021 at the United Nations Conference, COP 26 in Glasgow Scotland.

Omi was conferred with the national award "Karmaveer Chakra Gold," instituted by the United Nations and iCongo on 26 November 2023, in 12th edition of UN Karmaveer Chakra Awards held at Faridabad and “Karmaveer Chakra Silver” on 26 November 2019 in 11th edition of UN Karamveer Chakra Awards held at NCR, New Delhi. He received The Telegraph Northeast Excellence Award 2017 for his outstanding contribution towards the growth and development of the Northeast region of India. He was conferred with the Balipara Foundation Young Naturalist Award 2016 for his contribution to sustainable fashion in the Eastern Himalayas. Gurung was one of the TEDxTalk speakers for a TEDx event held on 8 October 2017 organized by Sikkim Manipal Institute of Technology under the license of TED, making him the first TEDx speaker from Sikkim.

He has been featured in leading print media in India including The Hindu, DNA, The Times Of India, Midday, My Bangalore, and Sikkim Mail.

Gurung was a founder of a Bangalore-based social group Oh My India (OMI) which created awareness across India to Reduce, Reuse, and Recycle domestic waste.

Gurung is the owner of Green Gangtok eco-friendly fashion boutique, the first of its kind in Sikkim. The boutique houses green choices in apparel, accessories and artifacts. The products are natural, upcycled and sustainable. He attempts to promote the green trend and propagate sustainable consumption among urban consumers.

He was chosen as "Top Ten Cutest Vegetarian Next Door 2013" by PETA India.

He was chosen as one of the Coolest North Easterners in 2014 by the North East India webzine The Thumb Print as an effort to celebrate achievers from North East India and an exercise to recognize those who inspire others with their works.

Gurung was listed in the top 50 famous Indian fashion designers in 2015 by JD Institute of Fashion Technology, and as one of the men's style icons from the Northeast by Eclectic North East magazine.

== Education ==
Gurung was educated at Holy Cross School in Tadong, Sikkim. He holds a fashion degree from Vogue Institute of Fashion Technology and a postgraduate diploma in journalism from Sri Sri Centre for Media Studies in Bangalore.

== Awards and recognition ==
- Omi was conferred with Shri N.J Yasaswy Memorial Award 2026 in recognition of outstanding contribution to entrepreneurship and innovation
- Omi was chosen as one of the youth icons of Sikkim by Election Commission of India for General Election 2019 and Lok Sabha Election 2019 to educate and to create awareness among people to cast their vote.
- One of the heroes (achievers) of Northeast at "Arunodoi Northeast Students and Youth Summit 2017" organized under the aegis of the State Level Advisory Committee for Students and Youth Welfare, Govt of Assam on 17 September 2017 at the IGNCA, New Delhi.
- The recipient of The Telegraph Northeast Excellence Award 2017 (The Telegraph, ABP Group)
- The recipient of Young Naturalist Award 2016 (Balipara Foundation)
- Chosen as the Coolest Northeasterner 2014 (The Thumbprint)
- He was a finalist in PETA India’s Cutest Vegetarian Next Door 2013.
- Gurung's design collection "Integration- a new identity" won The Most Creative Collection Award at the Vogue Mystique Designer Awards, 2005–2006, which was presented by the film actress, dancer and former MP Vyjayantimala Bali.
