= Environmental Earth Sciences =

- Discipline: Earth sciences
- Language: English
- Edited by: O. Kolditz, Yan Zheng

Publication details
- Former name: Environmental Geology
- History: Since 2009
- Publisher: Springer Science+Business Media
- Frequency: Semimonthly
- Impact factor: 2.8 (2024)

Standard abbreviations
- ISO 4: Environ. Earth Sci.

Indexing
- CODEN: EESNCZ
- ISSN: 1866-6280 (print); 1866-6299 (web)
- LCCN: 2010254001
- OCLC no.: 465491809

Links
- Journal homepage; Online archive

Environmental Earth Sciences is a semimonthly peer-reviewed scientific journal published by Springer Science+Business Media covering "the study of anthropogenically altered interactions within the geosphere and between the geosphere–biosphere". Six article types in 6 topical areas are published, including Groundwater systems, Deep sub-surface reservoirs, Geo-hazards, Geological and water resources engineering, Environmental impact assessment from a geological perspective, and Research tools. The editors-in-chief are Olaf Kolditz (TU Dresden) and Yan Zheng (Southern University of Science and Technology).

== Abstracting and indexing ==
The journal is abstracted and indexed by:

- Biological Abstracts
- BIOSIS Previews
- CAB Abstracts
- Current Contents/Agriculture, Biology & Environmental Sciences
- EBSCO databases
- Ei Compendex
- GEOBASE
- International Bibliography of Periodical Literature
- Inspec
- ProQuest databases
- Science Citation Index Expanded
- Scopus

According to the Journal Citation Reports, the journal has a 2024 impact factor of 2.8.
