= Scholarship of Teaching and Learning in Psychology =

- Discipline: Educational psychology
- Language: English
- Edited by: Dana S. Dunn

Publication details
- History: 2015–present
- Publisher: American Psychological Association (United States)
- Frequency: Quarterly

Standard abbreviations
- ISO 4: Scholarsh. Teach. Learn. Psychol.

Indexing
- ISSN: 2332-2101 (print); 2332-211X (web)
- LCCN: 2013274091
- OCLC no.: 863156080

Links
- Journal homepage; Online archive

Scholarship of Teaching and Learning in Psychology is a quarterly peer-reviewed academic journal established in 2015. It is published by the American Psychological Association. The editor-in-chief is Dana S. Dunn (Moravian University).

== Abstracting and indexing ==
The journal is abstracted and indexed in PsycINFO and Scopus.
