= Tek Bahadur Gurung =

Nepali politician (born 1954)

Honourable Tek Bahadur Gurung MP
- टेकबहादुर गुरुङ

Minister for Labour and Employment of Nepal
- In office 25 February 2014 – 24 December 2015
- President: Ram Baran Yadav
- Vice President: Paramananda Jha
- Succeeded by: Deepak Bohara

Member of Parliament, Pratinidhi Sabha
- Incumbent
- Assumed office 22 December 2022
- Preceded by: Polden Chopang Gurung
- Constituency: Manang 1

Member of the Constituent Assembly
- In office 21 January 2014 – 14 October 2017
- Preceded by: Dev Prasad Gurung
- Succeeded by: Polden Chopang Gurung (as Member of Parliament)
- Constituency: Manang 1

Personal details
- Born: November 26, 1954 (age 71) Tanki-3, Manang
- Party: Nepali Congress

Tek Bahadur Gurung (Nepali: टेकबहादुर गुरुङ) is a member of the Nepali Congress party who assumed the post of the Minister for Labour and Employment of Nepal on 25 February 2014 under Sushil Koirala-led government.

He is a member of the 2nd Nepalese Constituent Assembly. He won the Manang–1 seat in 2013 Nepalese Constituent Assembly election from the Nepali Congress.

== Personal life ==
Tek Bahadur Gurung was born on 26 November 1954 in Tanki-3, Manang, Nepal to Kazi Gurung and Pulama Gurung. He has acquired school education up to Grade 10. He is the founder chairperson of Manang Marsyandi Club and also a producer of a celluloid film – Jhhuma. He has two sons and two daughters. One of his son is businessman Karma Bahadur Gurung

== Political career ==
Gurung started his political career in 1979 from Nepali Congress. He was also a district chairperson of Nepali Congress of Manang District.
