= D. B. Gurung =

Nepalese writer

D. B. Gurung (Nepali: डी बी गुरुङ) was a poet, novelist and essayist from Nepal. He wrote in the English language. His essays speak about the turbulent history of Nepal that we have been experiencing over a decade. His notable book is the Echoes of the Himalayas.

== Bibliography ==
- Echoes of the Himalayas
- Breaking Twilight (Mahaveer Publishers, New Delhi) (2013)
- Whispers Poems (1992)
