= Hit Kaji Gurung =

Nepali politician

Personal details
- Party: Communist Party of Nepal (Unified Marxist-Leninist)

Hit Kaji Gurung (Nepali: हितकाजी गुरुङ) is a Nepalese politician, belonging to the Communist Party of Nepal (Unified Marxist-Leninist). In the 1999 parliamentary election he was elected from the Syangja-1 constituency, winning 22733 votes.

In the 2008 Constituent Assembly election he was elected from the Syangja-1 constituency, winning 18101 votes.
