= Palten Gurung =

Nepali politician

Personal details
- Party: Nepali Congress

Palten Gurung (Nepali: पाल्टेन गुरुङ) is a Nepalese politician, belonging to the Nepali Congress.

Gurung contested the Manang seat in the 1994 parliamentary election as an independent. Gurung won the seat, getting 2315 votes. In the 1999 parliamentary election he was elected unopposed from the same seat, running as a Nepali Congress candidate.

In February 2001 Gurung was named Minister of Labour and Transport Management in G.P. Koirala's cabinet. In July 2001 he was appointed to the same position in the ministry of Sher Bahadur Deuba.

In April 2008, Gurung contested the Manang seat in the Constituent Assembly election. He got 1209 votes, but was defeated by the Maoist Local Development Minister Dev Gurung.
