= Chakre Milan =

Nepali gangster

Milan Gurung
- मिलन गुरुङ
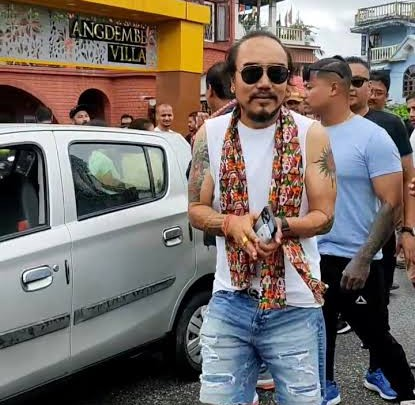
- Born: May 5, 1976; Kathmandu, Nepal
- Other name: Chakre Milan
- Occupations: Gangster; criminal
- Years active: 2000s–present
- Known for: Organized crime in Kathmandu
- Spouse: Indira Ghale Gurung
- Status: Acquitted in money laundering (2018) and murder cases (2024)
- Criminal charges: Assault; extortion; drug trafficking

Milan gurung, better known by his criminal alias Chakre don, is a Nepalese gangster. A self-proclaimed don, he is regarded as one of the most powerful gang leaders in Nepal, alongside his longtime rival Deepak Manange. The nickname "Chakre" is derived from Kathmandu Ring Road, a ring road area in Kathmandu where he was born and primarily operated.

== Money laundering case ==
In May 2013, the Department of Money Laundering Investigation (DoMLI) initiated legal proceedings against Milan Gurung, popularly known as Chakre Milan, along with several other individuals. The authorities accused him of acquiring assets through unlawful sources, estimating his property holdings to be worth around Rs 70 million. At the time, Gurung was incarcerated at the Central Jail in Sundhara on a separate conviction related to drug trafficking.

The investigation, led by the Central Investigation Bureau (CIB) of Nepal Police, alleged that land and other assets registered in his name had been gained through criminal conduct. Based on the findings, DoMLI requested the Special Court to impose financial penalties equivalent to the value of the alleged illegal property.

On 24 January 2018, the Special Court, comprising judges Ratna Bahadur Bagchand, Chandiraj Dhakal, and Pramod Kumar Shrestha, acquitted Gurung and two other defendants. The court ruled that the evidence presented was insufficient to establish that the properties were obtained through money laundering activities. As a result, the charges against him were dismissed.

== Criminal career ==
Gurung came to public attention in the early 2000s, a time marked by political instability in Nepal, during which several local gangs expanded their activities. He has been implicated in multiple criminal cases, including charges of attempted murder, assault, and organized.

Although he has been arrested on several occasions, reports have described him as continuing to maintain influence, allegedly due to political affiliations. His name has appeared in media accounts related to incidents involving public altercations, including the use of weapons and explosives.

In April 2023, Gurung was observed in Nepalgunj accompanied by individuals reportedly equipped with firearms, including a weapon resembling an AK-47. The sighting occurred outside a local hotel and attracted public and media attention due to the presence of unauthorized armed security. Although he was in the city at the time of a youth political event, reports indicated that he did not participate in the program. The incident raised questions regarding law enforcement oversight and the public display of restricted weapons.

== Personal life ==
Chakre Milan, as seen in a November 2024 My Republica article

He grew up in an environment marked by economic disparity, limited opportunity, and a rapidly changing urban identity. Chakre Milan was attacked by a gang of 15 men led by Deepak Manange in May 2004. He nearly lost his hand in the attack that involved swords. Chakre Milan's brother led an attack with swords and Khukuris in retaliation, which Manange survived. Manange was convicted of attempted murder and sentenced to five years in prison for the incident. Milan was at one time thought to be under the political protection of CPN UML leader Pradeep Nepal.

Chakre Milan's criminal record goes back to 2001, when he was first arrested for allegedly attacking Prince Dhirendra's son-in-law with a sword. He has been arrested multiple times since, including on charges of attempted murders with swords or guns.
