= Deepak Manange =

Nepali gangster-turned-politician

- दीपक मनाङे

Minister for Youth and Sports of Gandaki Province
- Incumbent
- Assumed office 12 June 2021
- Governor: Sita Kumari Poudel; Prithvi Man Gurung
- Chief Minister: Krishna Chandra Nepali Pokharel

Province Assembly Member of Gandaki Province
- Incumbent
- Assumed office 2017
- Preceded by: N/A
- Constituency: Manang 1(B)

Personal details
- Citizenship: Nepali
- Party: CPN (Unified Socialist)
- Profession: Politician, businessman, gangster

Rajiv Gurung, known by his alias Deepak Manange (Nepali: दीपक मनाङे), is a Nepali gangster and politician, who was elected to Gandaki Provincial Assembly in the 2017 elections from Manang (B) constituency as an independent candidate. He became the minister of sports in the provincial government in April 2021.

Manange started out as an extortionist in the tourist district of Thamel in the early 1990s. He made an arch-enemy out of fellow gangster Chakre Milan when he led a gang attack against Milan in 2004. He was convicted of assault in 2008 for a separate incident and sentenced to one year. In 2013, he was convicted of attempted murder for the 2004 incident and sentenced to five years. He had yet to complete his sentence when he ran for office in 2017, and was therefore legally ineligible to stand in the election. He was on the run in early 2018 but was arrested by April. The Supreme Court released him on bail in December and he took his oath of office in January 2019. He was arrested again in January 2020 after assaulting a fellow attendee of a public function.

== Early life and career ==
Born in Thamel, Kathmandu, Manange was raised in Kolkata and Sikkim in India. He completed his high school in Sikkim. He returned to Kathmandu around 1994 and ran a ready-made garments business for two years, selling Nepali garments in Delhi and bringing back leather jackets to sell in Nepal. He then moved to Moreh, India; he returned three years later. In Kathmandu, he started a nightclub called Yak Horn Bar. According to Manange, he came to be noticed by authorities after he beat up the then Crown Prince Dipendra's aide-de-camp, and was eventually forced to close the club. He went on to start multiple businesses in the capital, mainly discos, clubs and restaurants. He later started a construction business.

== Crime ==
A self-proclaimed don, Manange's involvement with crime in Kathmandu goes back to the early 1990s, when he started a protection racket in the tourist district of Thamel in Kathmandu, to extort hotel and restaurant owners. His first arrest was in 2059 BS (2002–03 CE). (Note: A Bikram Sambat (BS) year begins in mid-April.) He has been arrested at least a dozen times since.

=== 2004 attack on Chakre Milan ===
Manange led a 15-man attack against another Kathmandu gangster Chakre Milan in May 2004. Milan's left hand was nearly severed in the attack that involved swords. The incident left Milan physically weak, and made the two arch-rivals. Manange was arrested on 31 March 2005 charged with attempted murder; he was released from prison on 5 February 2007.

=== 2008 assault ===
Manange was found guilty of assault in a separate incident and sentenced to a year in prison in 2008. After serving a month, he managed to get himself released by successfully petitioning that he was Rajiv Gurung, not Deepak Manange (the named accused). Two months after release, he was rearrested on 22 February 2009, and made to serve the remaining eleven months, following a review. He was again arrested immediately after release on 20 January 2009, for manhandling a policeman. He was released a month later on a bail of Rs 25,000.

== Politics ==
Manange sought political protection and found favour with Pashupati Shamsher JBR of Rastriya Prajatantra Party (RPP). He then joined Laxman Tharu's Federalist Socialist Party in 2011–12 (2068 BS). He joined RPP in early 2017. In the 2017 local elections, RPP and Communist Party of Nepal (Unified Marxist–Leninist) (CPN UML) fielded joint candidates for Kathmandu city. Manange was arrested for fear that he might interfere in the election on behalf of RPP's deputy mayoral candidate; he was kept in the same cell with his arch-rival Chakre Milan who was also arrested to prevent disruption during the election. He defected from RPP, which he was the Manang district chairman of, along with the entire district committee, and joined CPN UML before the provincial elections of 2017.

=== Provincial Assembly member ===
The CPN UML district committee for Manang unanimously recommended Manange as the party candidate for Manang (B) constituency in the 2017 provincial assembly elections for the Gandaki Province. However, following public outcry, the party leadership nominated one of the other RPP defectors instead. The party's official candidate withdrew later, and the Left Alliance (Note: an electoral alliance between CPN UML and CPN (Maoist Centre), which led to their unification into the ruling Nepal Communist Party, after the election) supported Manange, who had filed his candidacy as an independent. He won the seat with 1,410 votes, defeating his nearest rival, Karma Gurung of Nepali Congress, who received 1020 votes.

Manange was on the run in early 2018. He was arrested in April 2018, and was sworn in in January 2019 after the Supreme Court released him on bail in December 2018. He joined the Nepal Communist Party shortly after.

Manange was again arrested on 23 January 2020 after the Kaski District Chairperson of All Nepal Football Association filed a First Information Report (FIR) against him alleging that he had verbally abused and beaten him during a public event two days earlier.

=== Minister ===
He was appointed sports minister for the provincial government on 29 April 2021, in an effort by the ruling CPN UML to secure support for chief minister Prithvi Subba Gurung's government, amid political turmoil in the aftermath of the 2020–21 dissolution and reinstatement of the Parliament of Nepal.
