= Gurung people =

Ethnic group of South Asia

Gurung
गुरुङ རྟམུ
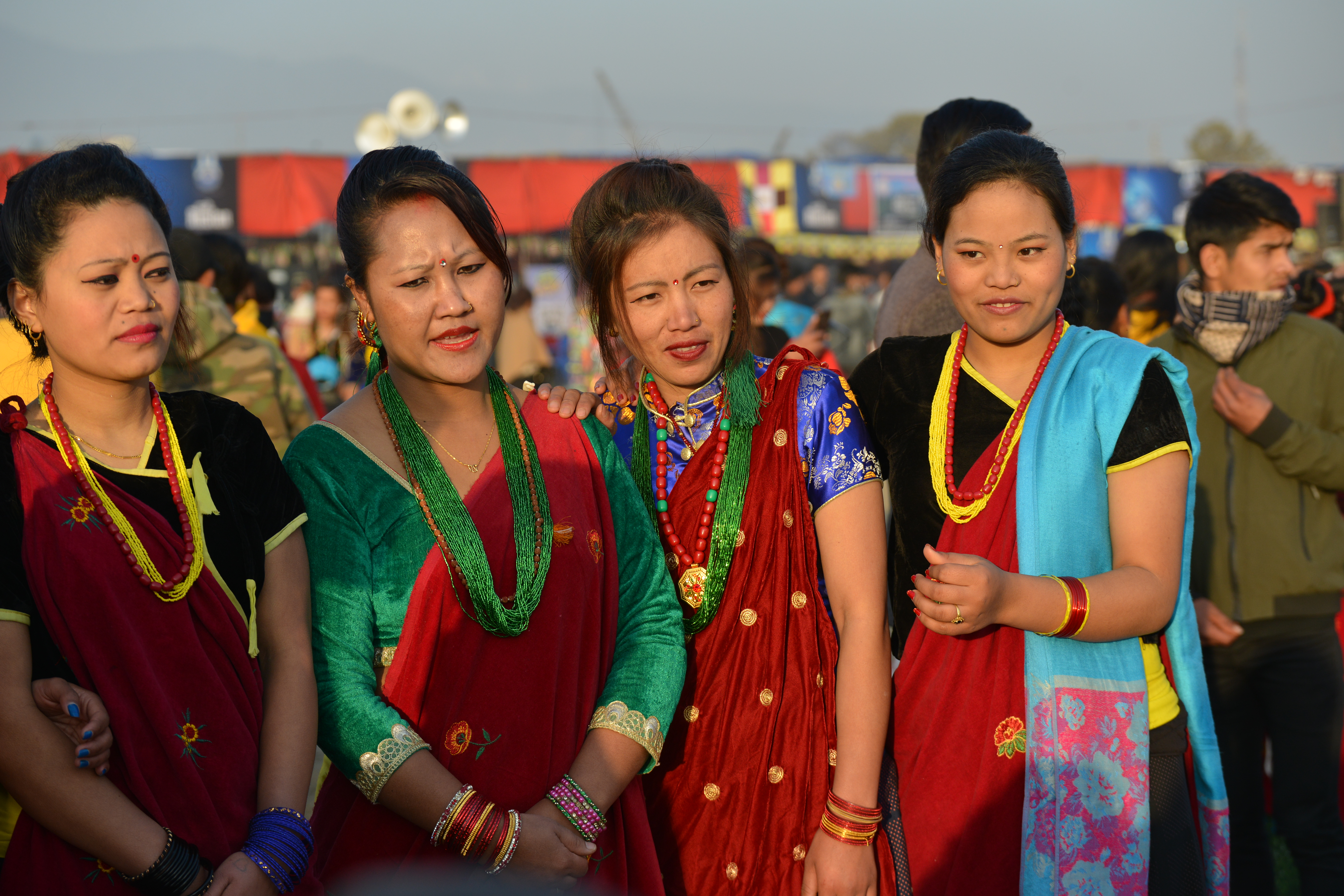
- Gurung people in traditional attire

Regions with significant populations
- Manang, Parbat, Lamjung, Mustang, Gorkha, Kaski, Tanahun, Syangja and Dolpa
- Nepal: 543,790 (2021)
- India: 139,000 (2021)
- United States: 17,000 (2023)
- United Kingdom: 75,000 (2023)

Languages
- Gurung, Nepali, Seke

Religion
- 54.4% Buddhism; 34.9% Hinduism; 10.7% Bon(2021)

Related ethnic groups
- Tibetan, Qiang, Tamang, Magar, Thakali, Sherpa

Gurung people

Tibetan name
- Tibetan: ཏམུ
Transcriptions
- Tibetan Pinyin: Tamu

Gurung (exonym; Nepali: गुरुङ) or Tamu (endonym; Gurung: རྟམུ) are a Tibetan ethnic group living in the hills and mountains of Gandaki Province of Nepal. Gurungs speak the Gurung language, which is also known as Tamu Kyi and is a Sino-Tibetan language derived from the Tibeto-Burman language family. The written form of Gurung is heavily dependent on the Tibetan script and history and details related to their culture and tradition is passed on from one generation to the other usually by word-of-mouth.

The Gurungs have historically lived a semi-nomadic lifestyle, herding sheep and yaks in the Himalayan foothills, but many have diversified into other professions while retaining strong ties to their cultural heritage.

== Etymology ==
The term Tamu (Gurung: རྟམུ) is used by the Gurungs to refer to themselves. According to oral traditions, the name Gurung is derived from the Tibetan word "Gru-gu", meaning "to bring down," reflecting their migration from the Tibetan plateau to the southern slopes of the Himalayas.

== History ==
The origin of the Gurung people can be traced back to Qiang people located in Qinghai, China.

After the end of the Anglo-Nepalese War and the signing of the Treaty of Sugauli in 1816, the British started recruiting soldiers into the British Army from the northern villages of Nepal. The majority of these soldiers come from four ethnic tribes, one of which is the Gurung tribe. Their distinguished service in various military campaigns has earned them numerous prestigious accolades, including highly decorated medals and Victoria Crosses. Their contributions have been recognized for their exceptional bravery, discipline, and commitment on the battlefield, solidifying their reputation as formidable soldiers within the British and Indian armed forces.

Gurungs continue to be recruited in the British, Indian and Bruneian armies and the Singapore Police Force (under British supervision) as regular soldiers and police officers who retire after serving for anywhere from 15 to 35 years. Upon retiring, with the exception of India, the soldiers and police officers serving in the Bruneian army and Singapore Police Force have to return to Nepal. In 1999, the British government updated its policy under the original 1816 Treaty of Sugauli and allowed Gurkha British Army retirees to settle with their families in the United Kingdom.

== Geographical distribution ==
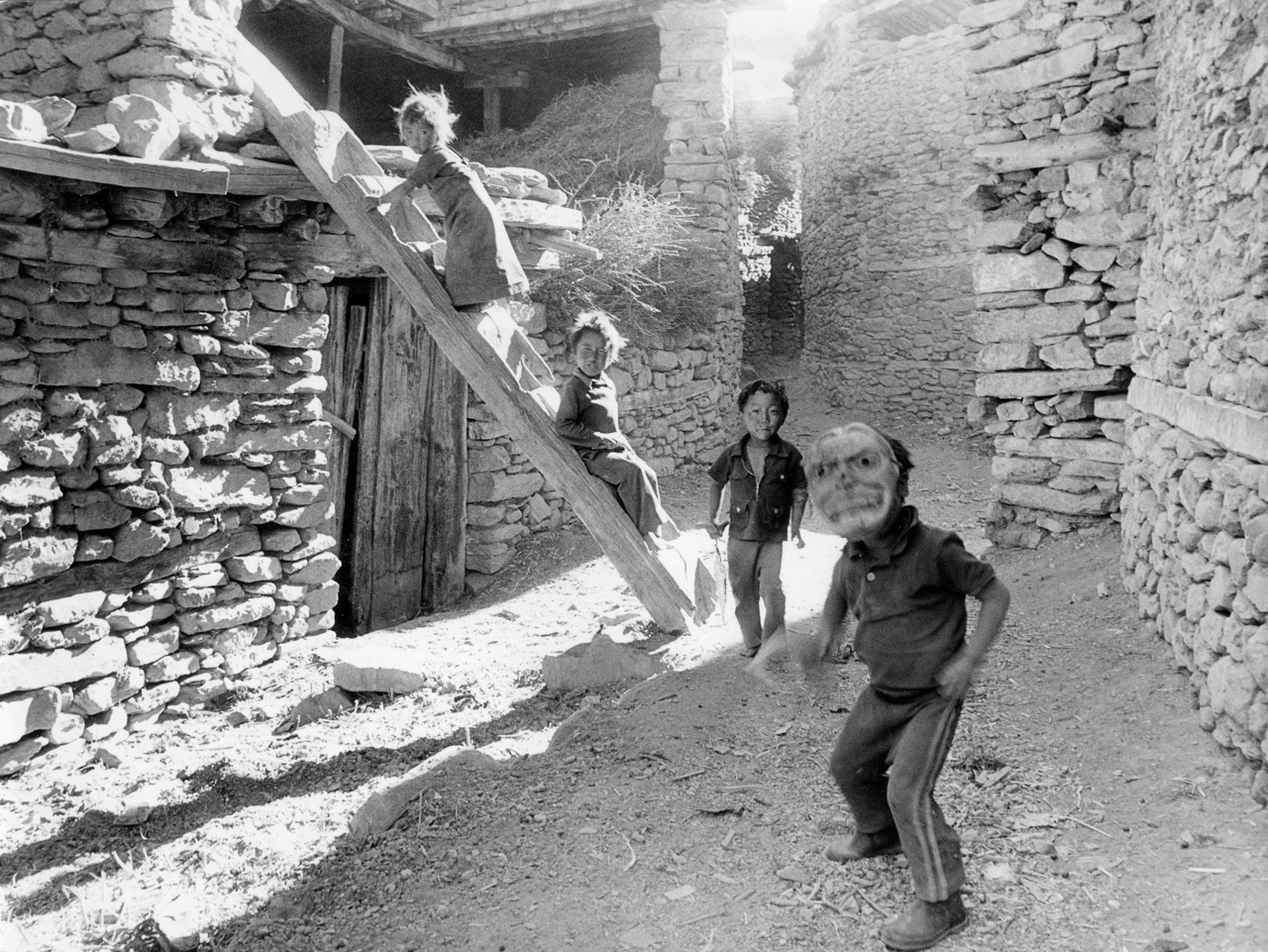
Manang

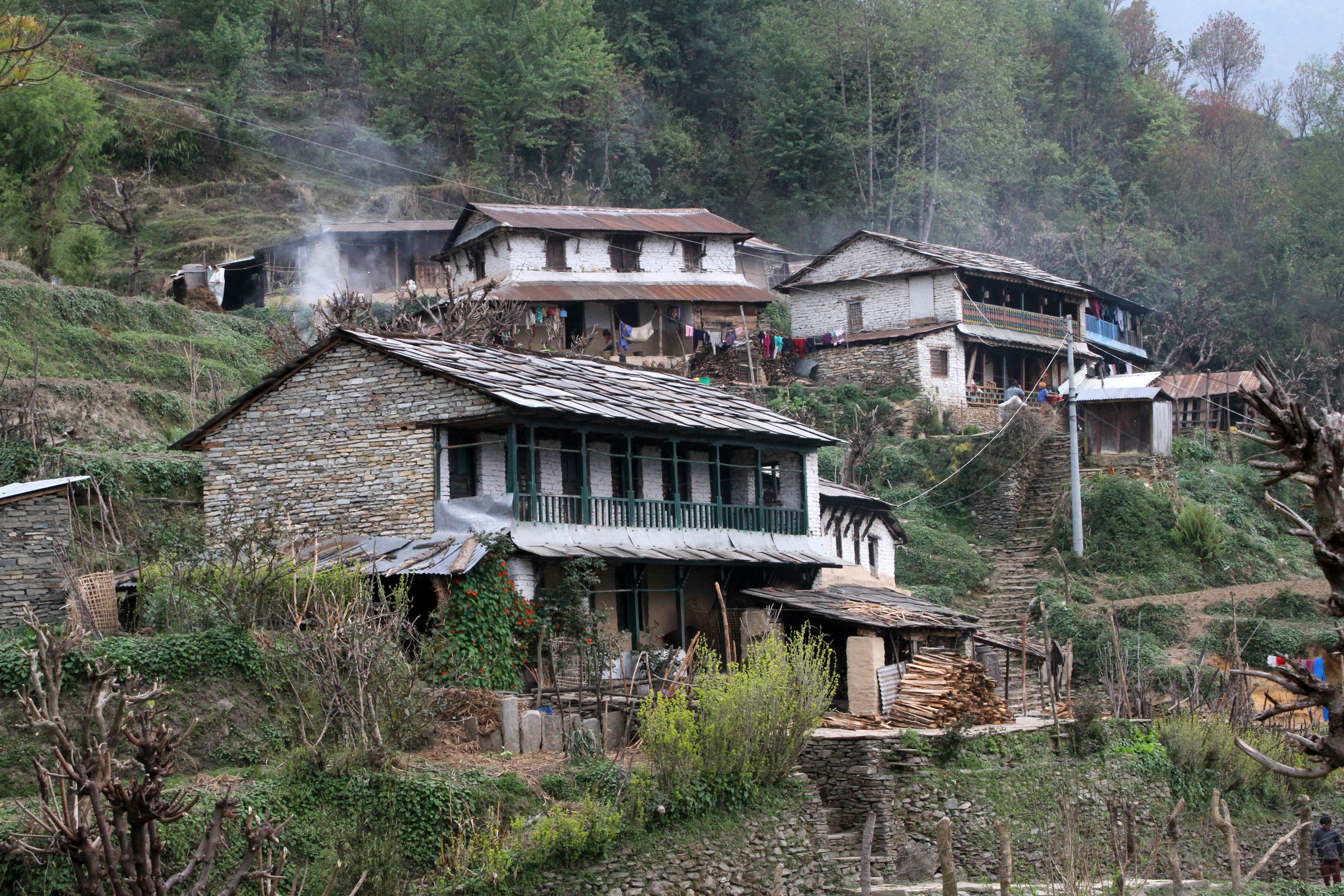
Gurung Ghandruk

At the time of the 2011 Nepal census, 798,658 people (2.97% of the population of Nepal) identified as Gurung. The proportions of Gurung people by province was as follows:

- Gandaki Province (11.4%)
- Bagmati Province (2.2%)
- Koshi Province (1.4%)
- Lumbini Province (0.9%)
- Karnali Province (0.7%)
- Sudurpashchim Province (0.2%)
- Madhesh Province (0.2%)

The proportions of Gurung people were higher than national average in the following districts:

- Manang (57.1%)
- Lamjung (31.4%)
- Mustang (20.1%)
- Gorkha (19.8%)
- Kaski (29.3%)
- Tanahun (11.6%)
- Syangja (9.0%)
- Dolpa (7.1%)
- Chitwan (6.8%)
- Dhading (5.6%)
- Sankhuwasabha (5.4%)
- Taplejung (4.6%)
- Parbat (3.7%)
- Rasuwa (3.1%)
- Tehrathum (2.9%)
- Ilam (2.9%)
- Nawalpur (2.9%)
- Kathmandu (2.6%)
- Rupandehi (2.0%)

== Language ==
The Gurung people speak Gurung, also known as Tamu Kyi, a Tibeto-Burman language of the Sino-Tibetan family. It is commonly classified within the Tamangic subgroup, and has historically developed in the central Himalayan region following the southward movement of Tibeto-Burman–speaking populations into present-day Nepal.

Due to settlement in geographically separated hill communities, the language shows substantial regional variation. Linguistic descriptions and community accounts note the existence of distinct village-based varieties, sometimes grouped into eastern and western dialect clusters, though boundaries between these groupings are not rigid.

Gurung is a tonal language and generally follows a subject–object–verb (SOV) structure typical of many Himalayan languages. It has traditionally been transmitted orally, though it is now also written using Devanagari as well as community-developed writing systems. Differences in pronunciation, vocabulary, and usage across regions remain a notable feature of the language.

In the mid-hill linguistic landscape of Nepal, Gurung exists alongside other Tibeto-Burman languages, including those spoken by neighboring groups such as the Magar. While these languages share a broader linguistic ancestry, they belong to different subgroups and are not mutually intelligible, although long-term geographic proximity has resulted in some shared features in vocabulary and language use.

Most Gurung speakers today are bilingual in Nepali, which functions as the dominant language of education, administration, and wider communication. Increased reliance on Nepali, along with migration and urbanization, has contributed to a decline in Gurung use among younger generations, raising concerns about its long-term vitality.

== Military Contributions ==
Gurungs have a long-standing tradition of serving in the Gorkha regiments of the British Army, Indian Army, and Singapore Police Force. Gurungs played a prominent role in both World War I and World War II, earning a reputation for their courage and valor. Gurungs continue to serve in elite regiments and contribute to maintaining security and peace.

== Culture and religion ==
Gurung people can be organised into different sub-clans:

Caste (jāt)	Traditional occupation	Clan titles (kul) or surnames (thar)	Notes
1. Four Clans (45%)	Buddhist family and Buddhist monk	Tamu: Kle, Lam, Kon, and Lem; Nepali: Ghale, Lama, Ghotaney and Lamichane	Buddhist priests and family priests of mostly from Parbat, Lamjung and Tanahu. During the 13th Dalai Lama's visit to Nepal in the early 20th century, the then Rana rulers appointed the esteemed monk from the village of Bhuka Deurali in Parbat district, Kumbasing Gurung as the Buddhist community's representative for northwestern Nepal. Lama Gurung had previously studied together with the 13th Dalai Lama in Tibet.
2. Sixteen Clans (65%)	Farmers and shepherd	Tamu: Pachyu, Ghyapri; Nepali: Paju, Ghyabring	Buddhist family from Syangja and Kaski

=== Festivals ===
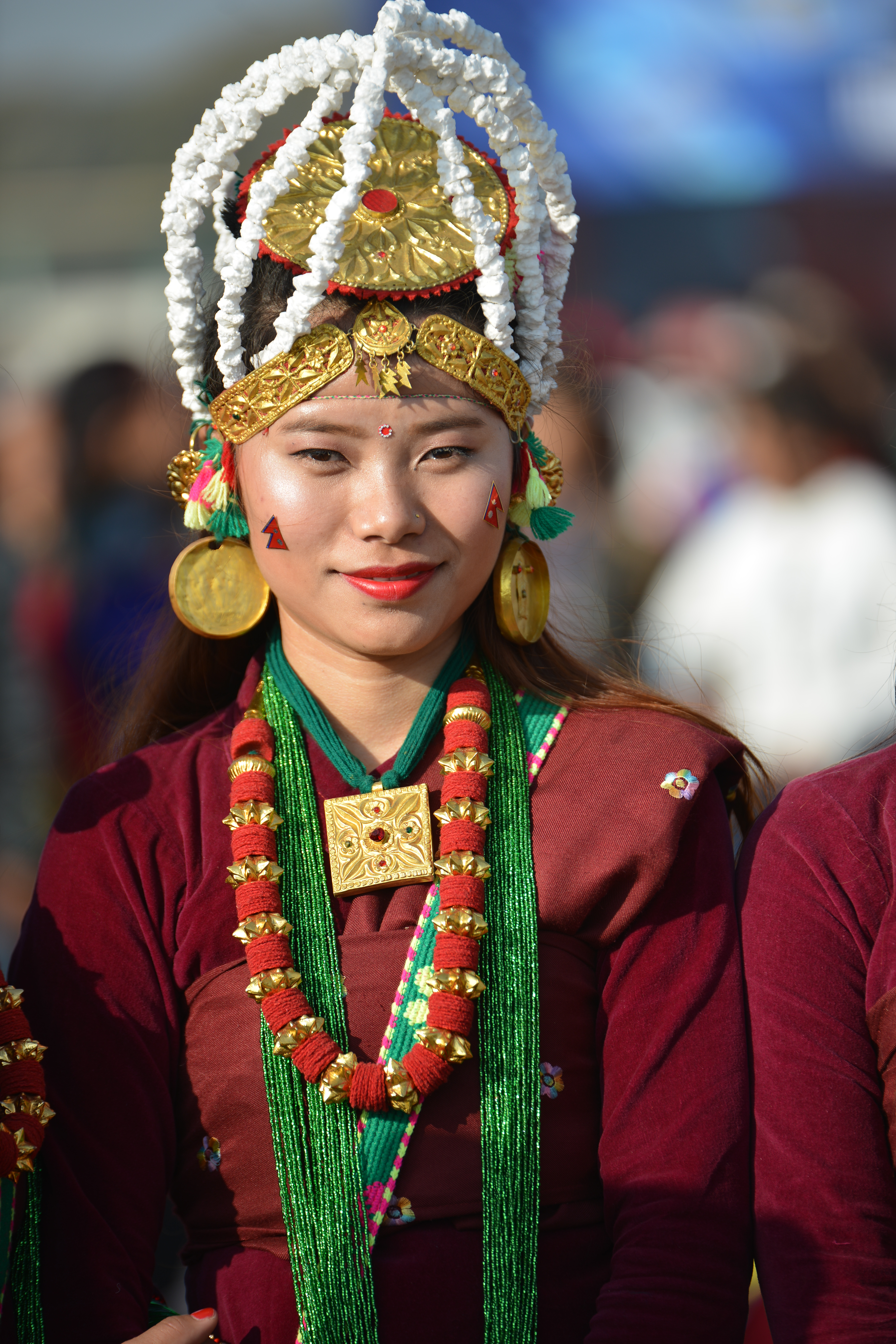
Gurung girl celebrating Tamu Lhosar (Gurung New Year)

Tamu Lhosar is the main festival of the Gurungs and is celebrated every year on the 15th of Poush (December/January) to celebrate the new year.

=== Religion ===
Gurung Dharma include Ghyabri (Ghyabring) and Pachyu (Paju). Lamas perform Buddhist rituals as needed, such as in birth, funeral, other family rituals (such as in Domang, Tharchang) and in Lhosar. Lamas perform Buddhist ceremonies primarily in Lamjung, Parbat, Kaski, Manang, Mustang, and elsewhere. Some Gurung villages have kept remnants of a pre-Buddhist form of the Bon religion, which flourished over two thousand years ago across much of Tibet and Western China. They have also kept aspects of an even older shamanic belief system that served as a counter to the Bon religion.

== Traditional dress ==
Traditional Gurung dress developed within the central Himalayan environment and reflects both adaptation to mountainous conditions and the use of locally available materials. Historically, clothing was made from handwoven wool and plant fibres such as nettle, with cotton and other fabrics increasingly incorporated through trade.

Women's traditional attire includes the cholo or chaubandi cholo blouse, the phariya or lungi skirt, the patuki sash tied around the waist, the ghalek worn across the body from the shoulder to the waist, and the pachhyauri or head/shoulder cloth. Ornamentation forms an important part of dress, including dori worn in the hair, kantha or muga ko mala necklaces, earrings, nose ornaments, anklets, and bangles.

Men's traditional attire includes the kachhad or kaas, a white wrap-around lower garment, worn with the bhoto, a short-sleeved shirt with front ties. The patuka is tied around the waist as a sash or belt, while the bhangra, also called ryenga or nhigi, is a handwoven wrap traditionally made from nettle fibre and worn across the chest, often serving as a carrying pouch. Men also commonly wore a cap and woollen coverings in colder highland areas, reflecting the practical demands of agricultural and pastoral life.

The development of Gurung dress shows parallels with that of neighboring groups such as the Magar, which are generally attributed to shared ecological conditions, similar subsistence practices, and long-standing regional interaction rather than direct cultural uniformity.

In contemporary Gurung communities, traditional clothing has largely declined in everyday use and is now primarily worn during festivals, rituals, and cultural events. This shift reflects broader social and economic changes, including increased access to market goods and the influence of urban lifestyles, while traditional attire continues to function as an important marker of cultural identity and heritage.

== Famous Gurung people ==
- Gaje Ghale – Recipient of the Victoria Cross for his bravery in World War II.
- Prabal Gurung – Internationally renowned fashion designer based in New York City.
- Pratima Gurung – Human rights activist

== See also ==
- Gurung language
- Gurung (surname), a surname of many Gurung people
