= 2nd Gandaki Provincial Assembly =

| ← | 1st Assembly |

Overview
- Legislative body: Gandaki Provincial Assembly
- Jurisdiction: Gandaki Province, Nepal
- Meeting place: Town Development Training Centre, Pokhara, Kaski District
- Term: 2 January 2023 –
- Election: 2022 provincial elections
- Government: Adhikari cabinet, 2023
- Website: pradeshsabha.gandaki.gov.np

Provincial Assembly
- Members: 60
- Speaker: Krishna Prasad Dhital, CPN (MC)
- Deputy Speaker: Bina Kumari Thapa, CPN (UML)
- Chief Minister: Surendra Raj Pandey, NC
- Leader of the Opposition: Hari Bahadur Chuman, CPN (MC)
- Party control: Government (51): Congress: 27; CPN (UML): 22; NSP: 1; Independent: 1; Opposition (9): CPN (MC): 7; RPP: 2

The second Gandaki Provincial Assembly was elected by the 2022 provincial elections on 20 November 2022. 60 members were elected to the assembly, 36 of whom were elected through direct elections and 24 of whom were elected through the party list proportional representation system. The first session of the assembly commenced from 2 January 2023.

== Leaders ==
=== Officers ===
- Speaker of the Assembly: Hon. Krishna Prasad Dhital (CPN (Maoist Centre))
- Deputy Speaker of the Assembly: Hon. Bina Kumari Thapa (CPN (UML))
- Leader of the House (Chief Minister): Hon. Khagaraj Adhikari (CPN (UML))
- Leader of the Opposition: Surendra Raj Pandey (Nepali Congress)

=== Parliamentary party ===
- Parliamentary party leader of Nepali Congress: Hon. Surendra Raj Pandey
- Parliamentary party leader of CPN (UML): Hon. Khagaraj Adhikari
- Parliamentary party leader of CPN (Maoist Centre): Hon. Hari Bahadur Chuman
- Parliamentary party leader of Rastriya Prajatantra Party: Hon. Pancharam Gurung

=== Whip ===
- Chief Whip of Nepali Congress: Hon. Nanda Prasad Neupane.
- Chief Whip of CPN (UML): Hon. Govinda Bahadur Nepali.
- Chief Whip of CPN (Maoist Centre): Hon. Kusum Buda Pun.
- Chief Whip of Rastriya Prajatantra Party: Hon. Bindu Paudel

== Composition ==

| Party | Seats | | | | | |
| Party | After election | | | At present | | |
| Party | FPTP | PR | Total | FPTP | PR | Total |
|---|---|---|---|---|---|---|
| Congress | 18 | 9 | 27 | 18 | 9 | 27 |
| CPN (UML) | 12 | 10 | 22 | 12 | 10 | 22 |
| Maoist Centre | 5 | 3 | 8 | 5 | 3 | 8 |
| RPP | 0 | 2 | 2 | 0 | 2 | 2 |
| Independent | 1 | — | 1 | 1 | — | 1 |
| Total | 36 | 24 | 60 | 36 | 24 | 60 |

== Members ==
Nepali Congress (27)
| Constituency/PR group | Member | Portfolio & Responsibilities |
|---|---|---|
| Gorkha 2 (B) | Surendra Raj Pandey | Leader of the Opposition; Parliamentary party leader |
| Gorkha 1 (B) | Nanda Prasad Neupane | Chief Whip |
| Manang 1 (A) | Munindra Jung Gurung | |
| Lamjung 1 (A) | Tek Raj Gurung | |
| Lamjung 1 (B) | Bhesh Bhahadur Paudel | |
| Kaski 2 (B) | Bindu Kumar Thapa | |
| Kaski 3 (B) | Prakash Baral | |
| Tanahun 1 (A) | Ashok Kumar Shrestha | |
| Tanahun 2 (B) | Jeet Prakash Ale Magar | |
| Syangja 2 (A) | Bhojraj Aryal | |
| Syangja 2 (B) | Mahesh Bhattarai | |
| Nawalpur 1 (A) | Mahendra Dhoj G.C. | |
| Mustang 1 (A) | Namdu Gurung | |
| Mustang 1 (B) | Bikal Sherhan | |
| Baglung 1 (A) | Dipendra Bahadur Thapa | |
| Baglung 1 (B) | Dilli Ram Subedi | |
| Baglung 2 (A) | Jeet Bahadur Sherchan | |
| Baglung 2 (B) | Drona Kumar Kunwar | |
| Indigenous peoples, Thakali | Bimala Gauchan | |
| Indigenous peoples | Rekha Gurung | |
| Indigenous peoples | Saraswati Gurung | |
| Indigenous peoples | Parbati Tamang | |
| Khas Arya | Saraswati Aryal | |
| Khas Arya | Champa Devi Khadka | |
| Khas Arya | Kalpana Tiwari | |
| Dalit | Dilmaya Pau.Bi. | |
| Dalit | Tika Kumari Basyal | |

CPN (UML) (22)
| Constituency/PR group | Member | Portfolio & Responsibilities |
|---|---|---|
| Indigenous peoples | Bina Kumari Thapa | Deputy Speaker of the Assembly |
| Kaski 1 (A) | Khagaraj Adhikari | Chief Minister of Gandaki Province; Parliamentary party leader |
| Syangja 1 (A) | Sita Kumari Sundas | Minister for Economic Affairs |
| Nawalpur 1 (B) | Roshan Bahadur Gaha Thapa | Chief Whip; Minister for Internal Affairs and Law |
| Kaski 1 (B) | Ved Bahadur Gurung | Minister for Agriculture, Energy and Water Resources |
| Kaski 2 (A) | Bhim Bahadur Karki | |
| Kaski 3 (A) | Ganesh Man Gurung | |
| Tanahun 2 (A) | Shyam Raja Mahat | |
| Syangja 1 (B) | Sudhir Kumar Paudel | |
| Nawalpur 2 (A) | Padama G.C. Shrestha | |
| Nawalpur 2 (B) | Laxman Bahadur Pandey | |
| Parbat 1 (A) | Bhakta Bahadur Kunwar | |
| Parbat 1 (B) | Mitralal Basyal | |
| Indigenous peoples | Lila Bahadur Thapa Magar | |
| Indigenous peoples | Nirmala Thapa | |
| Indigenous peoples, Bhujel | Raj Kumari Bhujel | |
| Khas Arya | Krishna Prasad Pathak | |
| Khas Arya | Prakash Bahadur K.C. | |
| Khas Arya | Yashoda Rimal | |
| Khas Arya | Devka Pahari | |
| Dalit | Gobinda Bahadur Nepali | |
| Dalit | Nandakala Damai Nepali | |

CPN (Maoist Centre) (8)
| Constituency/PR group | Member | Portfolio & Responsibilities |
|---|---|---|
| Gorkha 1 (A) | Krishna Prasad Dhital | Speaker of the Assembly |
| Tanahun 1 (B) | Hari Bahadur Chuman | Parliamentary party leader; Minister for Physical Infrastructure Development and Transport Management |
| Myagdi 1 (B) | Ramesh Bahadur Jugjali | Minister for Industry, Tourism and Environment |
| Gorkha 2 (A) | Phandindra Devkota | Elected from Nepal Socialist Party |
| Myagdi 1 (A) | Hari Bahadur Bhandari | |
| Indigenous peoples | Kushum Budha Pun | |
| Khas Arya | Sushila Simkhada | |
| Dalit | Damyanti Ruchal | |

Rastriya Prajatantra Party (2)
| Constituency/PR group | Member | Portfolio & Responsibilities |
|---|---|---|
| Indigenous peoples | Pancha Ram Gurung | Parliamentary party leader; Minister for Social Development and Health |
| Khas Arya | Bindu Adhikari | |

Independent (1)
| Constituency/PR group | Member | Portfolio & Responsibilities |
|---|---|---|
| Manang 1 (B) | Rajeev Gurung | |

== See also ==
- Gandaki Province
