= Chief Minister of Gandaki Province =

Head of Gandaki Province government

- गण्डकी प्रदेशका मुख्यमन्त्री
- Incumbent; Surendra Raj Pandey since 29 May 2024
- Government of Gandaki Province
- Style: Honorable; Mr. Chief Minister
- Status: Head of Government
- Abbreviation: CMO
- Member of: Provincial Assembly; Cabinet of Gandaki Province
- Appointer: Governor
- Term length: Until majority confidence retained in provincial assembly Assembly term is 5 years unless dissolved earlier; No term limits
- Formation: 2018 (8 years ago)
- First holder: Prithvi Subba Gurung
- Salary: रु. - 61,000
- Website: Official website

The Chief Minister of the Gandaki Province is the head of government of Gandaki Province. The chief minister is appointed by the governor of the province according to Article 167 of the Constitution of Nepal. The chief minister remains in office for five years or until the provincial assembly is dissolved, and is subject to no term limits, given that they have the confidence of the assembly.

The current chief minister is Nepali Congress's Surendra Raj Pandey, in office since 27 April 2023.

== Qualification ==
The Constitution of Nepal sets the qualifications required to become eligible for the office of chief minister. A chief minister must meet the qualifications to become a member of the provincial assembly.

A member of the provincial assembly must be:

- a citizen of Nepal
- a voter of the concerned province
- of 25 years of age or more
- not convicted of any criminal offense
- not disqualified by any law
- not holding any office of profit

In addition to this, the chief minister must be the parliamentary party leader of the party with the majority seats in the provincial assembly. If no party has a majority, the chief minister must have a majority in the assembly with the support from other parties. If within thirty days of the election, a chief minister is not appointed as such, or fails to obtain a vote of confidence from the assembly, the parliamentary party leader of the party with the most seats in the assembly is appointed chief minister. If the chief minister such appointed fails to obtain a vote of confidence in the assembly, any assembly member who can command a majority in the floor, irrespective of party allegiance, is appointed chief minister. If this chief minister also fails to obtain a vote of confidence, the governor dissolves the assembly and fresh elections are called.

== List of chief ministers of Gandaki province ==
No.	Portrait	Name Constituency (lifespan)	Term of office			Assembly (election)	Political party	Cabinet	Ref.
No.	Portrait	Name Constituency (lifespan)	Assumed office	Left office	Time in office	Assembly (election)	Political party	Cabinet	Ref.
1		Prithvi Subba Gurung; MPA for Lamjung 1 (B) (born 1958)	16 February 2018	9 May 2021	3 years, 82 days	1st (2017)	CPN (UML)	Gurung I & II	
1		Prithvi Subba Gurung; MPA for Lamjung 1 (B) (born 1958)	12 May 2021	12 June 2021	31 days	1st (2017)	CPN (UML)	Gurung I & II	
2		Krishna Chandra Nepali Pokharel; MPA for Nawalpur 1 (A) (born 1949)	12 June 2021	9 January 2023	1 year, 211 days	1st (2017)	Nepali Congress	Pokharel	
3		Khagaraj Adhikari; MPA for Kaski 1 (A) (born 1962)	9 January 2023	27 April 2023	108 days	2nd (2022)	CPN (UML)	Adhikari I	
4		Surendra Raj Pandey; MPA for Gorkha 2(B) (born 1964)	27 April 2023	4 April 2024	343 days	2nd (2022)	Nepali Congress	Pandey I	
(3)		Khagaraj Adhikari; MPA for Kaski 1 (A) (born 1962)	7 April 2024	27 May 2024	50 days	2nd (2022)	CPN (UML)	Adhikari II	
(4)		Surendra Raj Pandey; MPA for Gorkha 2(B) (born 1964)	29 May 2024	Incumbent	2 years, 155 days	2nd (2022)	Nepali Congress	Pandey II	
