= Second Surendra Raj Pandey cabinet =

Incumbent cabinet of Gandaki Province, since 2024

- 7th Cabinet of Gandaki Province
- 2024–present
- Date formed: 29 May 2024

People and organisations
- Governor: Dilli Raj Bhatta
- Chief Minister: Surendra Raj Pandey
- No. of ministers: 9 (incl. Chief Minister)
- Ministers removed: 1 resigned
- Total no. of members: 10
- Member parties: Nepali Congress CPN (Unified Marxist-Leninist) Nepal Socialist Party
- Status in legislature: Provincial Assembly 51 / 60 (85%)
- Opposition party: CPN (Maoist Centre)
- Opposition leader: Hari Bahadur Chuman

History
- Election: 2022
- Legislature term: 5 years
- Predecessor: Second Khagaraj Adhikari cabinet

The Second Surendra Raj Pandey cabinet is the 5th cabinet of Gandaki Province. It was formed after previous Chief minister, Khagaraj Adhikari was removed from post by Supreme Court citing the government formation as unconstitutional.

== Ministers by party ==
Party	Cabinet Ministers	Ministers of State	Total Ministers
Nepali Congress	3		
Independent	1		

== Council of ministers ==
S.N.	Portfolio	Holder	Party	Constituency	Took office
Cabinet ministers
1	Chief Minister: All ministries and berth remaining unalloted	Surendra Raj Pandey	Congress	Gorkha 2 (B)	29 May 2024
2	Minister for Social Development and Health	Bindu Kumar Thapa	Congress	Kaski 2 (B)	29 May 2024
3	Minister for Physical Infrastructure Development and Transport	Deepak Manange	Independent	Manang 1 (B)	29 May 2024
4	Minister for Economic Affairs	Dr Tek Raj Gurung	Congress	Lamjung 1 (A)	29 May 2024

== See also ==
- Kedar Karki cabinet
- Dilli Bahadur Chaudhary cabinet
- Kamal Bahadur Shah cabinet
