= 1st Gandaki Provincial Assembly =

First elected legislature of Gandaki Province (2018–2022)

2nd Assembly	→

Overview
- Legislative body: Gandaki Provincial Assembly
- Jurisdiction: Gandaki Province, Nepal
- Meeting place: Town Development Training Centre, Pokhara, Kaski District
- Term: 4 February 2018 – September 2022
- Election: 2017 provincial elections
- Government: Prithvi Subba Gurung cabinet Krishna Chandra Nepali cabinet
- Website: pradeshsabha.gandaki.gov.np

Provincial Assembly
- Members: 60
- Speaker: Netra Nath Adhikari (Maoist)
- Deputy Speaker: Srijana Sharma (UML)
- Chief Minister: Prithvi Subba Gurung (UML); Krishna Chandra Nepali (Congress)
- Leader of the Opposition: Krishna Chandra Nepali (Congress); Prithvi Subba Gurung (UML)

The first Gandaki Provincial Assembly was elected in the 2017 provincial elections. 60 members were elected to the assembly, 36 of whom were elected through direct elections and 24 of whom were elected through the party list proportional representation system. The assembly term started on 4 February 2018 and ended in September 2022. Prithvi Subba Gurung from the CPN (UML) and Krishna Chandra Nepali Pokharel from the Nepali Congress served as chief ministers during the assembly term. Netra Nath Adhikari was the assembly's speaker, and Srijana Sharma was the deputy speaker.

== Composition ==
Party	Seats	
Party	After election	At dissolution
CPN (UML)	27	26
Nepali Congress	15	15
CPN (Maoist Centre)	12	12
Rastriya Janamorcha	3	2
Nepal Socialist Party	—	2
Independent	1	1
Naya Shakti Party	2	—
Vacant	—	2
Total	60	60

== Leaders ==
=== Speaker ===
- Speaker of the Provincial Assembly: Hon. Netra Nath Adhikari
  - Deputy Speaker of the Provincial Assembly: Srijana Sharma

=== Parliamentary Party leaders ===
- Leader of the House (Nepali Congress):Hon. Krishna Chandra Nepali
- Leader of Opposition (CPN-UML): Prithvi Subba Gurung

=== Whips ===
- Government Chief Whip (Nepali Congress): Mani Bhadra Sharma
  - Whip (Nepali Congress): Om Kala Gautam
- Opposition Chief Whip (CPN-UML): Maya Nath Adhikari

== List of members ==
Constituency/PR group	Member	Party
Tanahu 2(A)	Asha Koirala	CPN (Maoist Centre)
Syangja 2(B)	Bhagwat Prasad Malla	Nepali Congress
Parbat 1(B)	Bikash Lamsal	CPN (UML)
Kaski 2(B)	Bindu Kumar Thapa	Nepali Congress
Myagdi 1(A)	Binod K.C	CPN (Maoist Centre)
Nawalparasi East 2(A)	Bishnu Prasad Lamichhane	Nepali Congress
Baglung 2(A)	Chandra Bahadur Budha	CPN (Maoist Centre)
Indigenous peoples, Thakali	Chandra Mohan Gauchan	CPN (UML)
Manang 1(A)	Chinta Bahadur Ghale	Nepali Congress
Indigenous peoples	Dhan Maya Pokharel (Lama)	Nepal Socialist Party
Lamjung 1(A)	Dhananjaya Dawadi	CPN (UML)
Dalit	Dilmaya Roka Magar Gautam	CPN (Maoist Centre)
Kaski 1(A)	Dipak Koirala	CPN (Maoist Centre)
Syangja 1(A)	Dipak Thapa	CPN (Maoist Centre)
Dalit	Dobate Bishwokarma	Nepali Congress
Indigenous peoples	Gayatri Gurung	CPN (Maoist Centre)
Tanahu 1(B)	Hari Bahadur Chuman	CPN (Maoist Centre)
Gorkha 2(A)	Hari Sharan Acharya	Nepal Socialist Party
Mustang 1(A)	Indra Dhara Dadu Bista	CPN (UML)
Baglung 1(A)	Indra Lal Sapkota	CPN (UML)
Nawalparasi East 2(B)	Janak Lal Shrestha	CPN (UML)
Dalit	Juna Devi Nepali	CPN (UML)
Baglung 2(B)	Khim Bikram Shahi	Rastriya Janamorcha
Tanahu 2(B)	Kiran Gurung	CPN (UML)
Dalit	Kopila Bohara	Nepali Congress
Nawalparasi East 1(A)	Krishna Chandra Nepali Pokharel	Nepali Congress
Khas Arya	Kumar Khadka	Nepali Congress
Indigenous peoples	Lalit Kala Gurung	Nepali Congress
Dalit	Laxmi Sunar	CPN (UML)
Gorkha 1(A)	Lekh Bahadur Thapa Magar	CPN (Maoist Centre)
Khas Arya	Madhu Adhikari Gurung	CPN (Maoist Centre)
Mustang 1(B)	Mahendra Bahadur Thakali	CPN (UML)
Kaski 1(B)	Man Bahadur Gurung	CPN (UML)
Indigenous peoples	Man Kumari Gurung	Nepali Congress
Khas Arya	Mani Bhadra Sharma	Nepali Congress
Khas Arya	Maya Nath Adhikari	CPN (UML)
Indigenous peoples	Mekha Lal Shrestha	Nepali Congress
Syangja 1(B)	Min Prasad Gurung	CPN (UML)
Indigenous peoples	Mina Gurung	CPN (UML)
Indigenous peoples	Mitra Kumari Gurung Subedi	CPN (UML)
Syangja 2(A)	Mohan Prasad Regmi	CPN (UML)
Myagdi 1(B)	Nara Devi Pun Magar	CPN (UML)
Parbat 1(A)	Netra Nath Adhikari	CPN (Maoist Centre)
Khas Arya	Om Kala Gautam	Nepali Congress
Indigenous peoples	Piyari Thapa	Rastriya Janamorcha
Khas Arya	Prabha Koirala	CPN (UML)
Gorkha 2(B)	Prakash Chandra Dawadi	Nepali Congress
Lamjung 1(B)	Prithvi Subba Gurung	CPN (UML)
Khas Arya	Pushpa KC (Bhandari)	CPN (UML)
Manang 1(B)	Rajiv Gurung	Independent
Kaski 3(B)	Rajiv Pahari	CPN (UML)
Tanahu 1(A)	Ram Bahadur Gurung	CPN (UML)
Gorkha 1(B)	Ram Sharan Basnet	CPN (UML)
Kaski 3(A)	Ramji Prasad Baral	CPN (Maoist Centre)
Nawalparasi East 1(B)	Roshan Bahadur Gaha Thapa	CPN (UML)
Indigenous peoples	Sabitra Rana	CPN (UML)
Indigenous peoples	Sarita Gurung	Nepali Congress
Khas Arya	Srijana Sharma	CPN (UML)

=== Changes ===
Constituency/PR group	Member	Party	Date seat vacated	Cause of vacation	New Member	Party
Baglung 2(B)	Tek Bahadur Gharti	Rastriya Janamorcha	13 December 2018	Death	Khim Bikram Shahi	Rastriya Janamorcha
Baglung 1(B)	Krishna Thapa	Rastriya Janamorcha	6 June 2021	Disobeying Party Whip		
Kaski 2(A)	Krishna Bahadur Thapa	CPN (UML)	25 April 2022	Resignation to contest as mayor of Pokhara		

== See also ==
- Gandaki Province
- 2017 Nepalese general election
