= First Surendra Raj Pandey cabinet =

- 5th Cabinet of Gandaki Province
- 2023–2024
- Date formed: 26 April 2023
- Date dissolved: 4 April 2024

People and organisations
- Governor: Prithvi Man Gurung
- Chief Minister: Surendra Raj Pandey
- Member parties: Nepali Congress CPN (Unified Socialist); Former Members: CPN (Maoist Centre)
- Status in legislature: Provincial Assembly 35 / 60 (58%) Majority Coalition government (April 2023 – March 2024); Provincial Assembly 28 / 60 (47%) Minority government (March – April 2024)
- Opposition party: CPN (Unified Marxist-Leninist)
- Opposition leader: Khagaraj Adhikari

History
- Election: 2022
- Legislature term: 5 years
- Predecessor: First Khagaraj Adhikari cabinet
- Successor: Second Khagaraj Adhikari cabinet

The First Surendra Raj Pandey cabinet was the 5th cabinet of Gandaki Province. It was formed after previous Chief minister, Khagaraj Adhikari failed to win vote of confidence.

== Ministers by party ==
| Party | Cabinet Ministers | Ministers of State | Total Ministers |
|---|---|---|---|
| Nepali Congress | 5 | | |
| Maoist Centre | 2 | | |

== Council of ministers ==
| S.N. | Portfolio | Holder | Party | Constituency | Took office | Left office |
|---|---|---|---|---|---|---|
Cabinet ministers
| 1 | Chief Minister | Surendra Raj Pandey | Congress | Gorkha 2 (B) | 28 April 2023 | 4 April 2024 |
| 2 | Minister for Social Development and Health | Sushila Simkhada | Maoist Centre | | 28 April 2023 | 5 March 2024 |
| 3 | Minister for Energy, Water Resources and Drinking Water | Saraswati Aryal | Congress | | 28 April 2023 | 4 April 2024 |
| 4 | Minister for Agriculture and Land Management | Mahendra Dhoj G.C. | Congress | Nawalpur 1 (A) | 12 May 2023 | |
| 5 | Minister for Physical Infrastructure Development and Transport | Resham Bahadur Jugjali | Maoist Centre | Myagdi 1 (B) | 12 May 2023 | 5 March 2024 |
| 6 | Minister for Economic Affairs | Jit Prakash Ale Magar | Congress | Tanahun 2 (B) | 12 May 2023 | |
| 7 | Minister for Industry, Tourism, Forest and Environment | Dipendra Bahadur Thapa | Congress | Baglung 1 (A) | 12 May 2023 | 4 April 2024 |

== See also ==
- Kedar Karki cabinet
- Dilli Bahadur Chaudhary cabinet
- Kamal Bahadur Shah cabinet
