= Surendra Raj Pandey cabinet =

Surendra Raj Pandey cabinet may refer to:

- First Surendra Raj Pandey cabinet
- Second Surendra Raj Pandey cabinet
