= Dharmaraj K.C. =

Nepalese politician

The Honourable Dharmaraj K.C.
- धर्मराज क.सी.

Member of Parliament, Pratinidhi Sabha
- Incumbent
- Assumed office 26 March 2026
- Preceded by: Prithvi Subba Gurung
- Constituency: Lamjung 1

Personal details
- Citizenship: Nepalese
- Party: Rastriya Swatantra Party
- Education: Ajou University (ME)
- Profession: Politician

Dharmaraj K.C. (Nepali: धर्मराज क.सी.) is a Nepalese politician serving as a member of parliament from the Rastriya Swatantra Party. He is a member of the 7th Pratinidhi Sabha, elected from Lamjung 1 constituency in 2026 Nepalese General Election, securing 33,898 votes and defeating his closest contender Prithvi Subba Gurung of the CPN UML. He previously worked as chief advisor for Mahabir Pun under the Ministry of Education, Science and Technology of Sushila Karki Government.

He previously contested the same constituency in 2022 Nepalese general election for the RSP and was defeated by Gurung. He holds a Master's degree in Engineering from Ajou University, South Korea.
