= Prithvi Subba Gurung cabinet =

First cabinet of Chief Minister Prithvi Subba Gurung in Gandaki Province (2018–2021)

First Prithvi Subba Gurung cabinet
- 1st Cabinet of Gandaki Province
- Date formed: 12 February 2018
- Date dissolved: 9 May 2021

People and organisations
- Governor: Baburam Kunwar; Amik Sherchan; Sita Kumari Poudel
- Chief Minister: Prithvi Subba Gurung
- Member parties: Nepal Communist Party
- Status in legislature: Provincial Assembly 42 / 60 (70%)
- Opposition party: Nepali Congress
- Opposition leader: Krishna Chandra Nepali Pokharel

History
- Election: 2017
- Legislature term: 5 years
- Predecessor: Province established
- Successor: Second Prithvi Subba Gurung

Prithvi Subba Gurung was sworn in as Chief Minister of Gandaki Province on 12 February 2018. Here is the list of ministers.

== Cabinet Ministers ==
S.N.	Portfolio	Name Constituency	Political Party	Took office	Left office
Cabinet ministers
1	Chief Minister; All other ministries not allocated to anyone.	Prithvi Subba Gurung; MPA for Lamjung 1(B)	CPN (UML)	12 February 2018	9 May 2021
2	Minister for Economic Affairs and Planning	Kiran Gurung; MPA for Tanahu 2(B)	CPN (UML)	26 March 2018	9 May 2021
3	Minister for Physical Infrastructure Development	Ram Sharan Basnet; MPA for Gorkha 1(B)	CPN (UML)	26 March 2018	9 May 2021
4	Minister for Social Development	Nar Devi PunMPA for Myagdi 1(B)	CPN (UML)	26 March 2018	9 May 2021
5	Minister for Industry, Tourism, Forest and Environment	Bikas Lamsal; MPA for Parbat 1(B)	CPN (UML)	26 March 2018	9 May 2021
6	Minister for Youth and Sports	Rajiv Gurung	Independent	29 April 2021	9 May 2021

=== Until April 2021 ===
S.N.	Portfolio	Name Constituency	Political Party	Took office	Left office
Cabinet ministers
1	Chief Minister; All other ministries not allocated to anyone.	Prithvi Subba Gurung; MPA for Lamjung 1(B)	CPN (UML)	12 February 2018	12 June 2018
2	Minister for Economic Affairs and Planning	Kiran Gurung; MPA for Tanahu 2(B)	CPN (UML)	26 March 2018	9 May 2021
3	Minister for Internal Affairs and Law	Hari Bahadur Chuman; MPA for Tanahu 1(B)	Maoist Centre	16 February 2018	7 April 2021
4	Minister for Physical Infrastructure Development	Ram Sharan Basnet; MPA for Gorkha 1(B)	CPN (UML)	26 March 2018	9 May 2021
5	Minister for Social Development	Nar Devi PunMPA for Myagdi 1(B)	CPN (UML)	26 March 2018	9 May 2021
6	Minister for Industry, Tourism, Forest and Environment	Bikas Lamsal; MPA for Parbat 1(B)	CPN (UML)	26 March 2018	9 May 2021
7	Ministry for Land Management, Agriculture and Co-operatives	Lekh Bahadur Thapa Magar; Gorkha 1(A)	Maoist Centre	16 February 2018	7 April 2021

=== Until February 2018 ===
S.N.	Portfolio	Name Constituency	Political Party	Took office	Left office
Cabinet ministers
1	Chief Minister; All other ministries not allocated to anyone.	Prithvi Subba Gurung; MPA for Lamjung 1(B)	CPN (UML)	12 February 2018	12 June 2018
3	Minister for Internal Affairs and Law	Hari Bahadur Chuman; MPA for Tanahu 1(B)	Maoist Centre	16 February 2018	7 April 2021
4	Minister for Industry, Tourism, Forest and Environment	Ram Sharan Basnet; MPA for Gorkha 1(B)	CPN (UML)	16 February 2018	26 March 2018
7	Ministry for Land Management, Agriculture and Co-operatives	Lekh Bahadur Thapa Magar; Gorkha 1(A)	Maoist Centre	16 February 2018	7 April 2021

== Second cabinet ==
First Prithvi Subba Gurung cabinet
- 2nd Cabinet of Gandaki Province
- Date formed: 12 May 2021
- Date dissolved: 12 June 2021

People and organisations
- Governor: Sita Kumari Poudel
- Chief Minister: Prithvi Subba Gurung
- Member parties: Communist Party of Nepal (Unified Marxist–Leninist)
- Status in legislature: Provincial Assembly 26 / 60 (43%)
- Opposition party: Nepali Congress
- Opposition leader: Krishna Chandra Nepali Pokharel

History
- Election: 2017
- Legislature term: 5 years
- Predecessor: First Prithvi Subba Gurung
- Successor: Krishna Chandra Nepali Pokharel cabinet

The Second Prithvi Subba Gurung cabinet was the 2nd provincial government of Gandaki Province. It was formed after Prithvi Subba Gurung was sworn in as Chief Minister of Gandaki Province on 12 May 2021.

S.N.	Portfolio	Name Constituency	Political Party	Took office	Left office
Cabinet ministers
1	Chief Minister	Prithvi Subba Gurung; MPA for Lamjung 1(B)	CPN (UML)	12 May 2021	12 June 2021
1	Minister for Health and Population	Prithvi Subba Gurung; MPA for Lamjung 1(B)	CPN (UML)	12 May 2021	12 June 2021
2	Minister for Finance	Kiran Gurung; MPA for Tanahu 2(B)	CPN (UML)	18 May 2021	12 June 2021
2	Minister for Land Management, Agriculture, Cooperatives and Poverty Alleviation	Kiran Gurung; MPA for Tanahu 2(B)	CPN (UML)	18 May 2021	12 June 2021
3	Minister for Physical Infrastructure, Urban Development and Transport Management	Ram Sharan Basnet; MPA for Gorkha 1(B)	CPN (UML)	18 May 2021	12 June 2021
3	Minister for Energy, Water Resources and Water Supply	Ram Sharan Basnet; MPA for Gorkha 1(B)	CPN (UML)	18 May 2021	12 June 2021
3	Minister for Law, Communications and Provincial Assembly Affairs	Ram Sharan Basnet; MPA for Gorkha 1(B)	CPN (UML)	18 May 2021	12 June 2021
4	Minister for Education, Culture, Science, Technology and Social Development	Nar Devi PunMPA for Myagdi 1(B)	CPN (UML)	18 May 2021	12 June 2021
5	Minister for Tourism, Industry, Commerce and Supplies	Bikas Lamsal; MPA for Parbat 1(B)	CPN (UML)	18 May 2021	12 June 2021
5	Minister for Forest, Environment and Soil Conservation	Bikas Lamsal; MPA for Parbat 1(B)	CPN (UML)	18 May 2021	12 June 2021
6	Minister for Youth and Sports	Rajiv Gurung	Independent	18 May 2021	12 June 2021
