= Chief minister (Nepal) =

Head of government of each province in Nepal

Chief minister of the provinces of Nepal
- नेपालका प्रदेशका मुख्यमन्त्री
- Emblem of Nepal

- Flag of Nepal
- Style: The Honourable
- Member of: Provincial assemblies of Nepal
- Residence: Various
- Appointer: Governor of respective provinces
- Term length: Until majority confidence maintained in provincial assembly Assembly term is 5 years unless dissolved earlier; No term limits
- Formation: 2018

Party affiliation of chief ministers by province as of December 2025 ▌Nepali Congress (4 provinces) ▌CPN (UML) (3 provinces)

In Nepal, the chief minister (Nepali: मुख्यमन्त्री) is the elected head of government of each of the seven provinces. The chief minister is appointed by the governor of the provinces according to Article 167 of the Constitution of Nepal.

Following the election of the provincial assembly, the governor of each province invites the leader of the parliamentary party with a majority of the seats in the assembly to form a government. If no party has a majority, the governor invites the party with a majority with support from other parties in the assembly. The appointed chief minister must retain the confidence of the assembly and the term of such a chief minister is as long as the term of the provincial assembly of the province.

== Eligibility ==
The Constitution of Nepal sets the qualifications required to become eligible for the office of chief minister. A chief minister must meet the qualifications to become a member of the provincial assembly.

A member of the provincial assembly must be:

- a citizen of Nepal
- a voter of the concerned province
- of 25 years of age or more
- not convicted of any criminal offense
- not disqualified by any law
- not holding any office of profit

In addition to this, the chief minister must be the parliamentary party leader of the party with the majority seats in the provincial assembly. If no party has a majority, the chief minister must have a majority in the assembly with the support from other parties. If within thirty days of the election, a chief minister is not appointed as such, or fails to obtain a vote of confidence from the assembly, the parliamentary party leader of the party with the most seats in the assembly is appointed chief minister. If the chief minister such appointed fails to obtain a vote of confidence in the assembly, any assembly member who can command a majority in the floor, irrespective of party allegiance, is appointed chief minister. If this chief minister also fails to obtain a vote of confidence, the governor dissolves the assembly and fresh elections are called.

== Incumbent chief ministers ==
Province (past chief ministers)	Name	Portrait	Assumed office (tenure length)	Party	Ministry	Ref.
Koshi (list)	Hikmat Kumar Karki		9 May 2024 (2 years, 197 days)	CPN (UML)	H Karki III	
Madhesh (list)	Saroj Kumar Yadav		22 November 2026 (0 days)	People's Socialist Party, Nepal	Saroj Yadav II	
Bagmati (list)	Kiran Thapa Magar		21 August 2026 (93 days)	CPN (UML)	Thapa Magar	
Gandaki (list)	Surendra Raj Pandey		29 May 2024 (2 years, 177 days)	Nepali Congress	Pandey II	
Lumbini (list)	Chet Narayan Acharya		24 July 2024 (2 years, 121 days)	CPN (UML)	Acharya	
Karnali (list)	Mangal Bahadur Shahi		29 July 2026 (116 days)	NCP	Mangal Shahi	
Sudurpashchim (list)	Khagaraj Bhatta		14 August 2026 (100 days)	NCP	K. Bhatta	

== See also ==
- Governor (Nepal)
- Provincial governments of Nepal
