= Gandaki Provincial Assembly =

Unicameral legislature of Gandaki Province, Nepal

Gandaki Provincial Assembly गण्डकी प्रदेश सभा
- 2nd Gandaki Provincial Assembly

Type
- Type: Unicameral legislature of Gandaki Province

History
- Founded: 2018

Leadership
- Speaker: Krishna Parsad Dhital, NCP since 14 January 2023
- Deputy Speaker: Bina Kumari Dhital, CPN (UML) since 16 January 2023
- Leader of the House: Surendra Raj Pandey, NC since 29 May 2024
- Leader of Opposition: Khagaraj Adhikari, CPN (UML) since 25 August 2026

Structure
- Political groups: Government (28): Congress: 27; NSP: 1; Opposition (29): CPN (UML): 22; NCP: 7; neutral & crossbench (2): RPP: 2; Vacate (1): Vacate: 1
- Length of term: 5 years

Elections
- Voting system: Parallel voting: 36 seats – FPtP; 24 seats – PR
- First election: 2017
- Last election: 20 November 2022
- Next election: 2027

Meeting place
- Town Development Training Centre, Pokhara, Kaski District

Website
- pradeshsabha.gandaki.gov.np

Constitution
- Constitution of Nepal

The Provincial Assembly of Gandaki Province also known as the Gandaki Province Sabha, (Nepali: गण्डकी प्रदेश सभा) is a unicameral governing and law making body of Gandaki Province, one of the seven provinces in Nepal. The assembly is seated at the provincial capital Pokhara in Kaski District at the Urban Development Training Centre. The assembly has 60 members of whom 36 are elected through first-past-the-post voting and 24 of whom are elected through proportional representation. The term of the assembly is five years until dissolved earlier.

The First Provincial Assembly was constituted in 2017, after the 2017 provincial elections. The current assembly was elected in November 2022.

== History ==
The Provincial Assembly of Gandaki Province is formed under Article 175 of the Constitution of Nepal 2015 which guarantees a provincial legislative for each province in the country. The first provincial elections were conducted for all seven provinces in Nepal and the elections in Gandaki Province was conducted for 60 seats to the assembly. The first meeting of the provincial assembly was held on 4 February 2018. Netra Nath Adhikari from Maoist Centre was elected as the first speaker of the provincial assembly, and Srijana Sharma from CPN (UML) as the first deputy speaker of the provincial assembly.

== List of assemblies ==
Election Year	Assembly	Start of term	End of term	Speaker	Chief Minister	Party
2017	1st Assembly	4 February 2018	September 2022	Netra Nath Adhikari	Prithvi Subba Gurung (Cabinet)	CPN (UML)
2017	1st Assembly	4 February 2018	September 2022	Netra Nath Adhikari	Krishna Chandra Nepali Pokharel (Cabinet)	Nepali Congress
2022	2nd Assembly	2 January 2023	Incumbent	Krishna Dhital	Khagaraj Adhikari (Cabinet)	CPN (UML)
2022	2nd Assembly	2 January 2023	Incumbent	Krishna Dhital	Surendra Raj Pandey (Cabinet)	Nepali Congress
2022	2nd Assembly	2 January 2023	Incumbent	Krishna Dhital	Khagaraj Adhikari (Cabinet)	CPN (UML)
2022	2nd Assembly	2 January 2023	Incumbent	Krishna Dhital	Surendra Raj Pandey (Cabinet)	Nepali Congress

== Committees ==
Article 195 of the Constitution of Nepal provides provincial assemblies the power to form special committees in order to manage working procedures.

S.No.	Committee	Membership
1	Work Arrangement Advisory	11
2	Legislative	13
3	Public Accounts	13
4	Finance and Development	14
5	Provincial Affairs	11

== Current composition ==
Party	Parliamentary party leader	Seats
Nepali Congress	Surendra Raj Pandey	27
CPN (UML)	Khagaraj Adhikari	22
CPN (Maoist Centre)	Hari Bahadur Chuman	8
Rastriya Prajatantra Party		2
Independent	Rajiv Gurung	1
Total		60

== See also ==
- Gandaki Province
- Provincial assemblies of Nepal
