= Prithvi Subba Gurung =

Nepalese politician

- पृथ्वी सुब्बा गुरुङ

Minister of Communication and Information Technology of Nepal
- In office 15 July 2024 – 9 September 2025
- President: Ram Chandra Poudel
- Prime Minister: KP Sharma Oli
- Preceded by: Rekha Sharma
- Succeeded by: Jagdish Kharel

1st Chief Minister of Gandaki Province
- In office 16 February 2018 – 12 June 2021
- President: Bidya Devi Bhandari
- Governor: Baburam Kunwar; Amik Sherchan; Sita Kumari Poudel
- Preceded by: Province established
- Succeeded by: Krishna Chandra Nepali

Minister of Culture, Tourism and Civil Aviation of Nepal
- In office 1 April 2007 – 12 August 2008
- Prime Minister: Girija Prasad Koirala
- Preceded by: Pradeep Kumar Gyawali
- Succeeded by: Hisila Yami

Leader of the Opposition in the Gandaki Provincial Assembly
- In office 12 June 2021 – 9 January 2023
- Governor: Sita Kumari Poudel; Prithvi Man Gurung
- Chief Minister: Krishna Chandra Nepali Pokharel
- Preceded by: Krishna Chandra Nepali Pokharel
- Succeeded by: Surendra Raj Pandey
Parliamentary offices
Member of Parliament, Pratinidhi Sabha
In office 22 December 2022 – 12 September 2025
| Preceded by | Dev Prasad Gurung |
| Succeeded by | Dharmaraj K.C. |
| Constituency | Lamjung 1 |
Member of the Gandaki Provincial Assembly
In office 1 February 2018 – 2 September 2022
| Preceded by | Constituency established |
| Succeeded by | Bhesh Prasad Poudel |
| Constituency | Lamjung 1(B) |
Member of 1st Nepalese Constituent Assembly
In office 28 May 2008 – 28 May 2012
| Preceded by | Hari Bhakta Adhikari |
| Succeeded by | Chandra Bahadur Kunwar |
| Constituency | Lamjung 2 |

Personal details
- Born: February 13, 1958 (age 68) Lamjung District
- Party: CPN (UML)
- Parent(s): Ganga Prasad Gurung and Chini Gurung

Prithvi Subba Gurung (Nepali: पृथ्वी सुब्बा गुरुङ) is a Nepalese politician and former Chief Minister of Gandaki Province, a province in western Nepal. He became the leader of the opposition in Gandaki after serving as the Chief minister of the province for 3 years. He was a member of the 1st Nepalese Constituent Assembly and Minister of Culture, Tourism and Civil Aviation, Nepal. He was unanimously selected as Parliamentary Party leader of the CPN (UML) for Gandaki Province on 11 February 2018.

He was appointed as the chief minister, according to Article 168 (1) of the Constitution of Nepal, and took the oath of his office and secrecy as a chief minister on 16 February 2018. As of 9 May 2021, he resigned from the post after losing majority, and hence his resignation was approved by the governor. Among the elected office bearers from the 11th General Convention of the CPN (UML), Prithvi Subba Gurung, who was elected as the Vice President, received the highest number of votes and elected as Vice-Chair.

== Early life ==
Prithvi Subba Gurung was born in Gilung (now Kwhlosothar), Lamjung, Nepal to Ganga Prasad Gurung and Chini Gurung. He studied in Amrit Science Campus (ASCOL), Kathmandu, Nepal. Before he entered full-time politics, he was a teacher.

== Political career ==
He became involved with the All Nepal National Free Students’ Union (ANNFSU) while he was in Grade 8. During his time at Ishaneswor Higher Secondary School in Lamjung, he served as the Secretary of the Free Student Union (FSU). He later became affiliated with the All Nepal National Free Students’ Union (ANNFSU) at Amrit Science Campus.

After completing his B.Sc., he returned to his village and worked as a teacher and school principal, while also becoming actively involved in the teachers’ movement. He was arrested for his political activities and, during the Panchayat era, contested the 2043 B.S. election as a pro-democracy candidate while still in prison.

He subsequently contested parliamentary elections from Lamjung in 2048, 2051, 2054, and 2056 B.S., but was defeated on each occasion. In 2064 B.S., he was elected to the Constituent Assembly from Lamjung. He also contested the second Constituent Assembly election in 2069 B.S. but was defeated.

In 2074 B.S., he contested the provincial assembly election from Lamjung and was elected, subsequently becoming the Chief Minister of the province. He served as Chief Minister for approximately three years. Following the split in the Nepal Communist Party, he became the Leader of the Opposition.

In 2079 B.S., he was elected to the House of Representatives from Lamjung. In 2081 B.S., he was appointed Minister for Communications and Information Technology.

On Bhadra 23, 2082 B.S., the Gen Z movement took place, and on Bhadra 24, he fled from his official residence. Later, he again contested the federal elections held on Falgun 21, 2082 B.S., but was defeated by Dharma Raj KC of the Rastriya Swatantra Party by a significant margin.
