= Mahendra Dhoj G.C. =

Nepali politician

Mahendra Dhwoj G.C.

Agricultural and Land Development Minister of Gandaki Province - State no.4

Personal details
- Party: Nepali Congress

Mahendra Dhoj G.C. (Nepali: महेन्द्रध्वज जिसी) is a Nepalese politician, belonging to the Nepali Congress. He is currently a state minister, Agricultural minister and Land development, in Gandaki pradesh-4. In the 2008 Constituent Assembly election he was elected from the Nawalparasi-2 constituency, winning 12166 votes. He has been engaged in politics since his early 20s, and has been continuously engaged ever since. In the last Constitutional Assembly he was the Parliamentary Secretary of the Nepali Congress Party. He has engaged his entire life in social service, spearheading many development projects in the villages, and is the most popular leader of Nepali Congress Party in Nawalparasi District.

Mahendra Dhwoj GC won the 2020 state election and got elected from Nawalpur, formally Nawalparasi, and became the Ministry of Agricultural, Health and Land Development.
