= Gandaki Province =

Province of Nepal

Gandaki Province गण्डकी प्रदेश
- Province
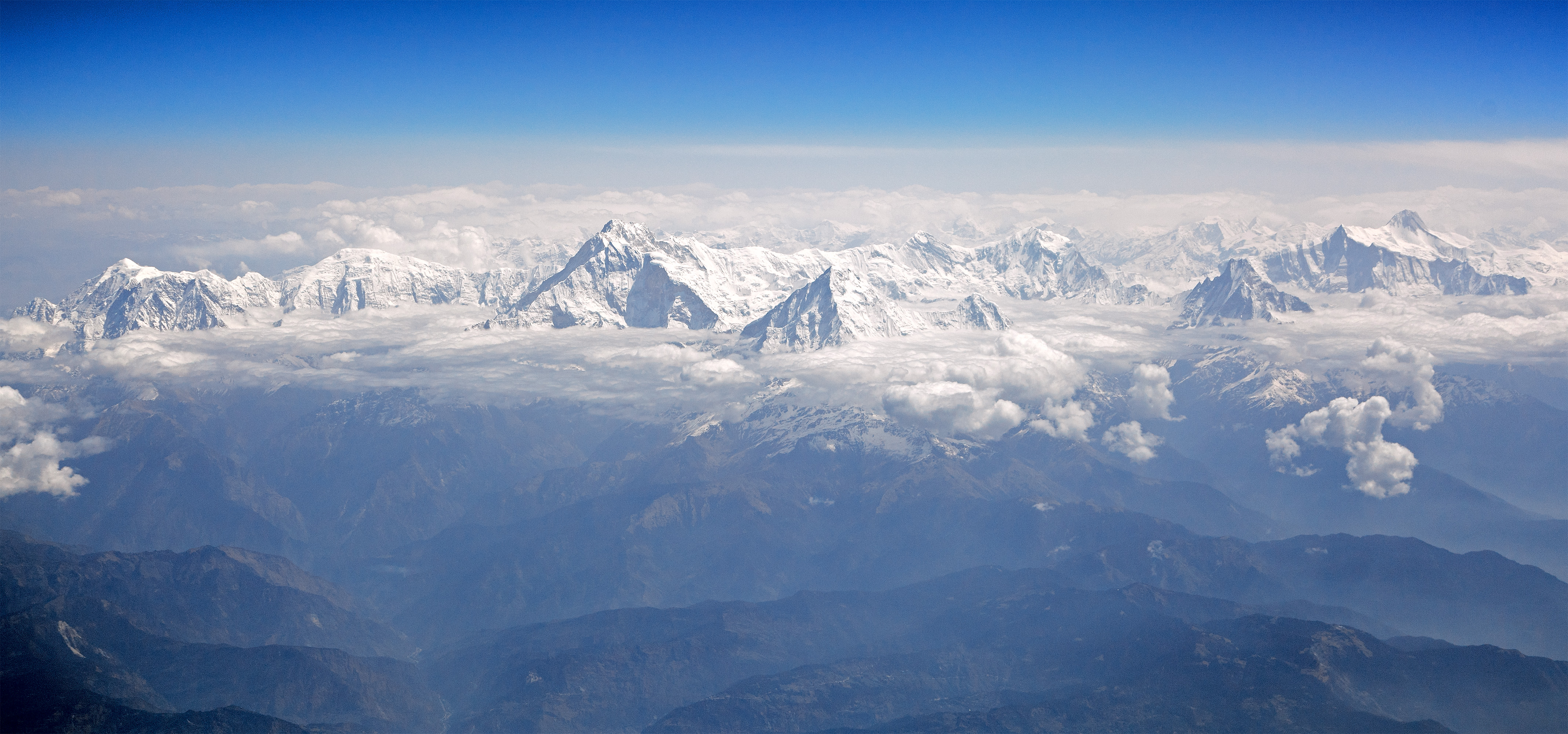
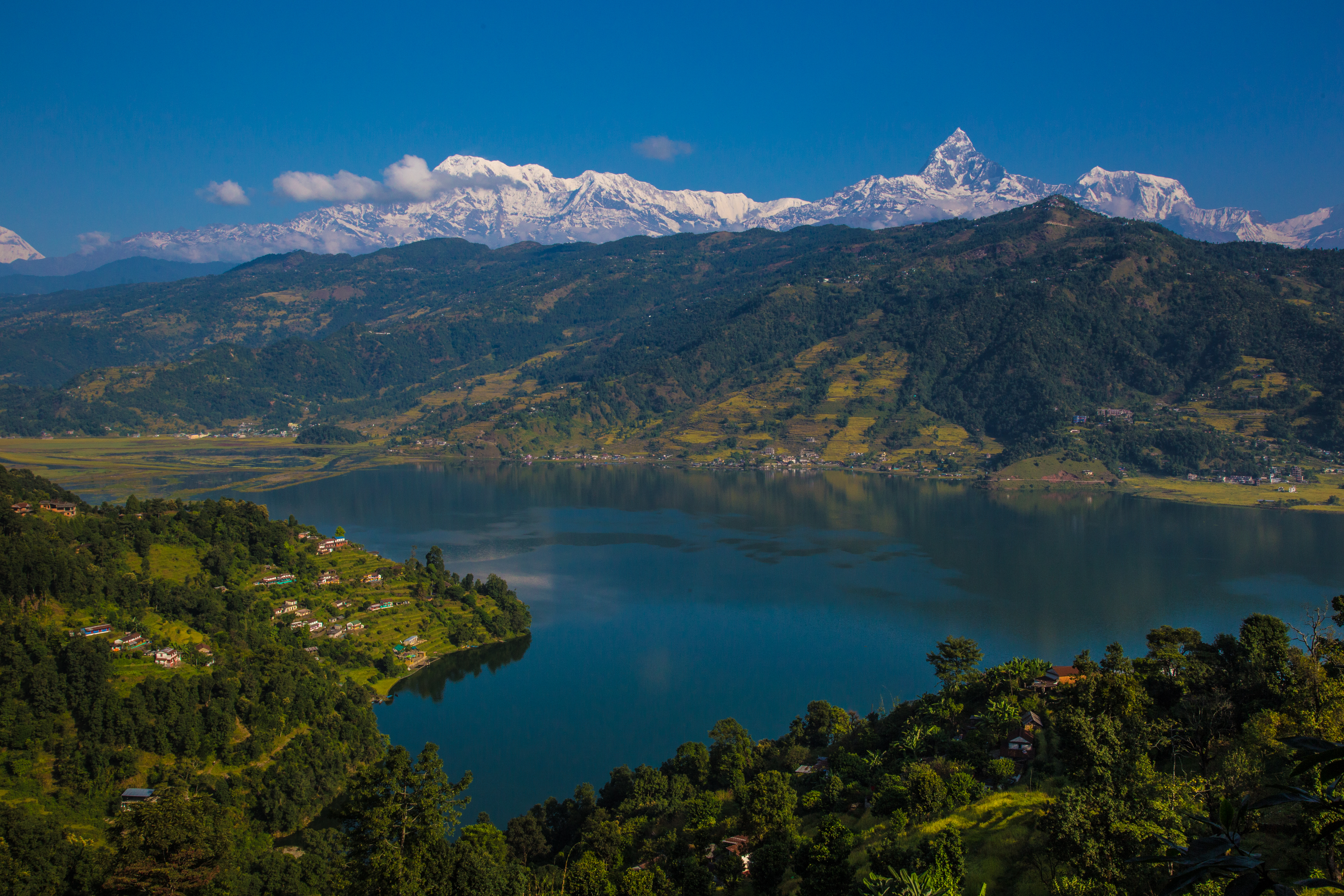
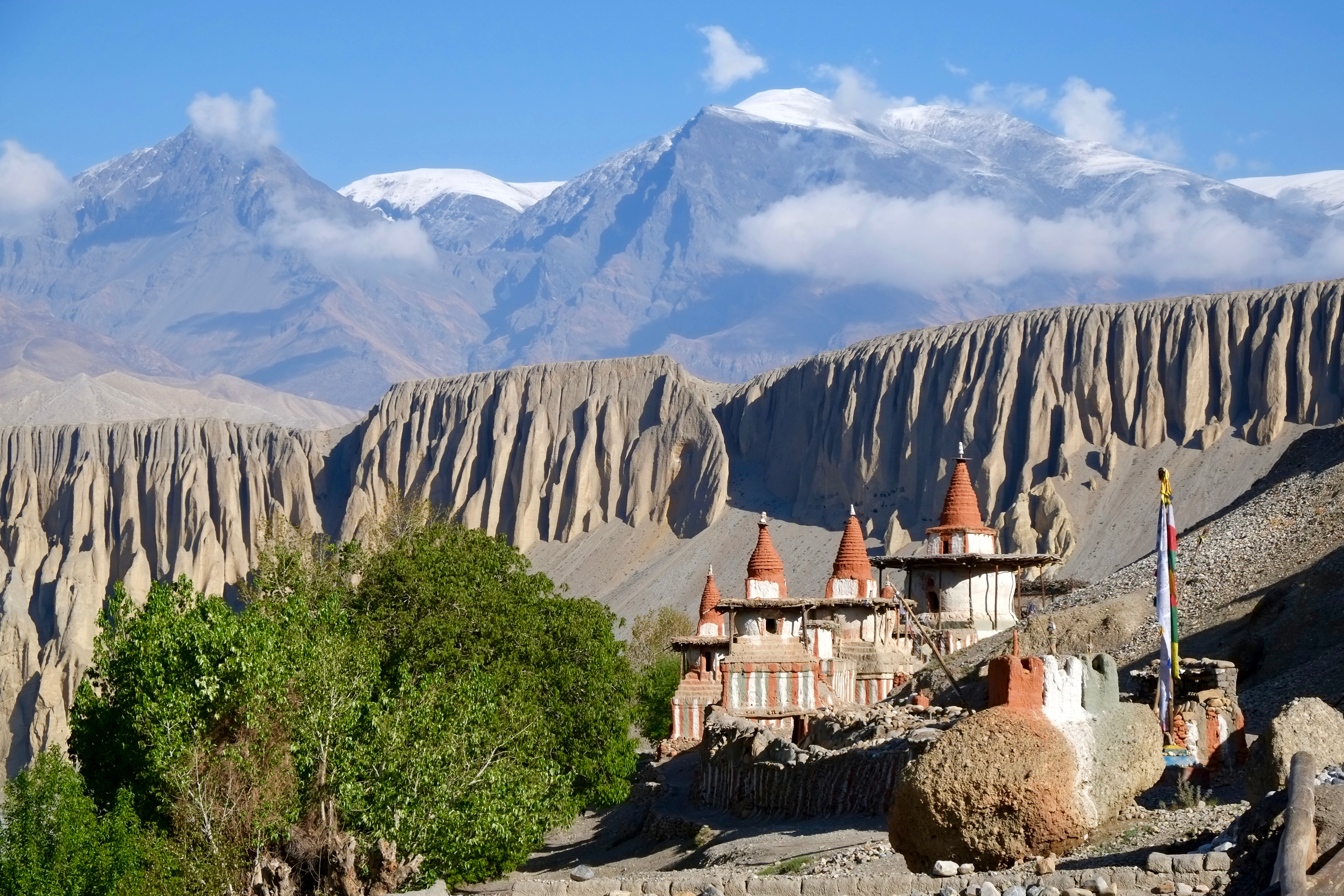
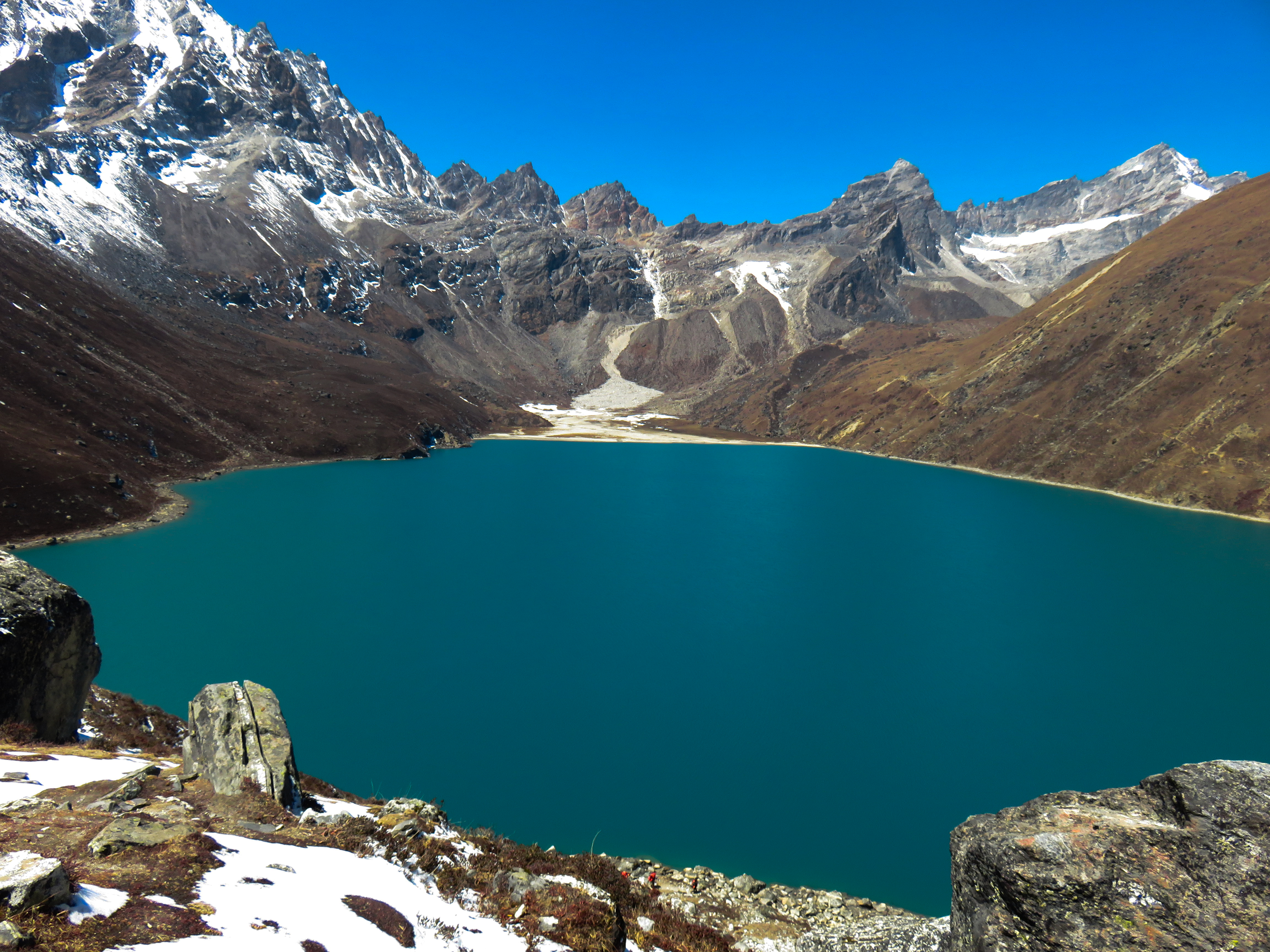
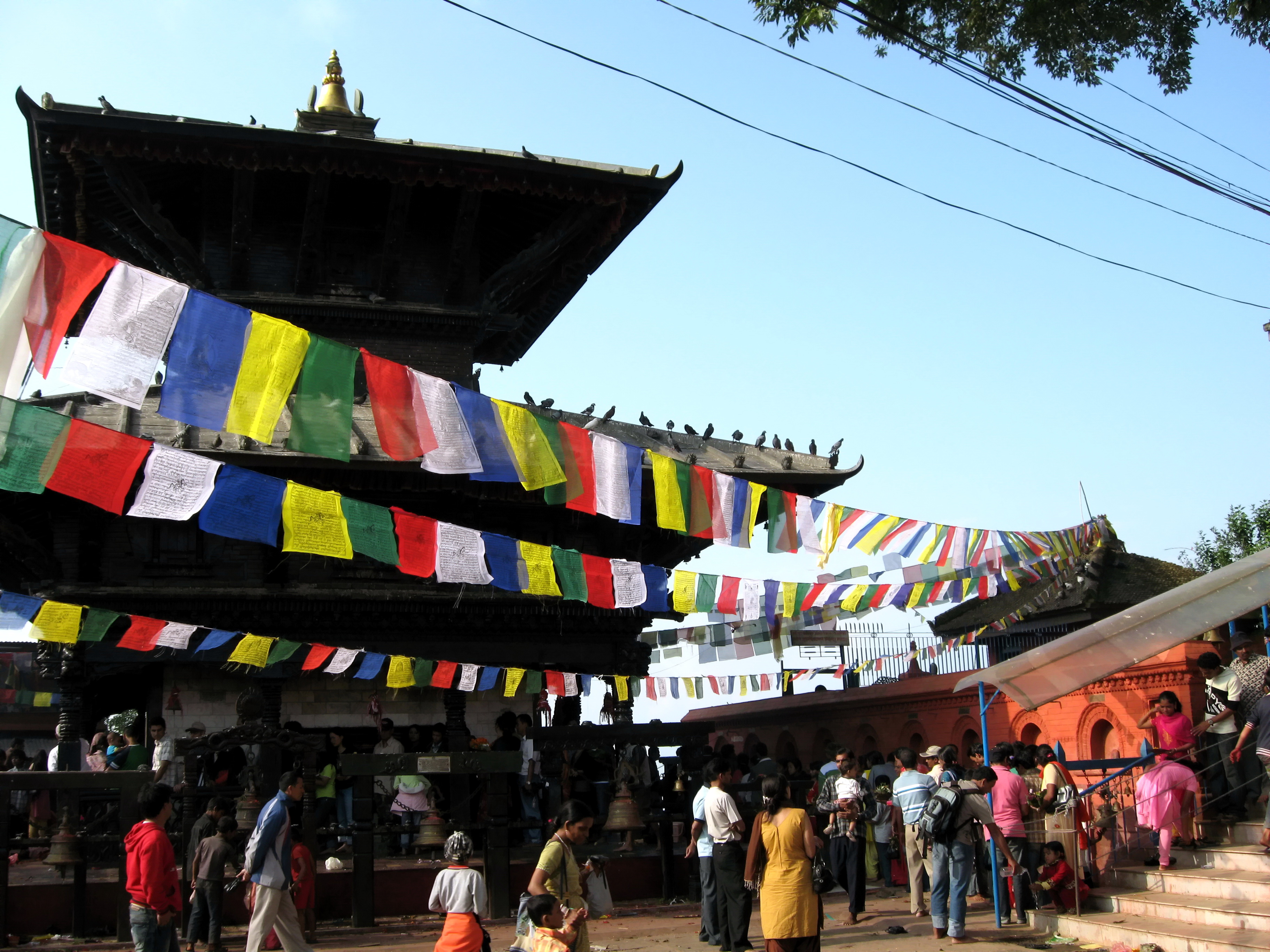
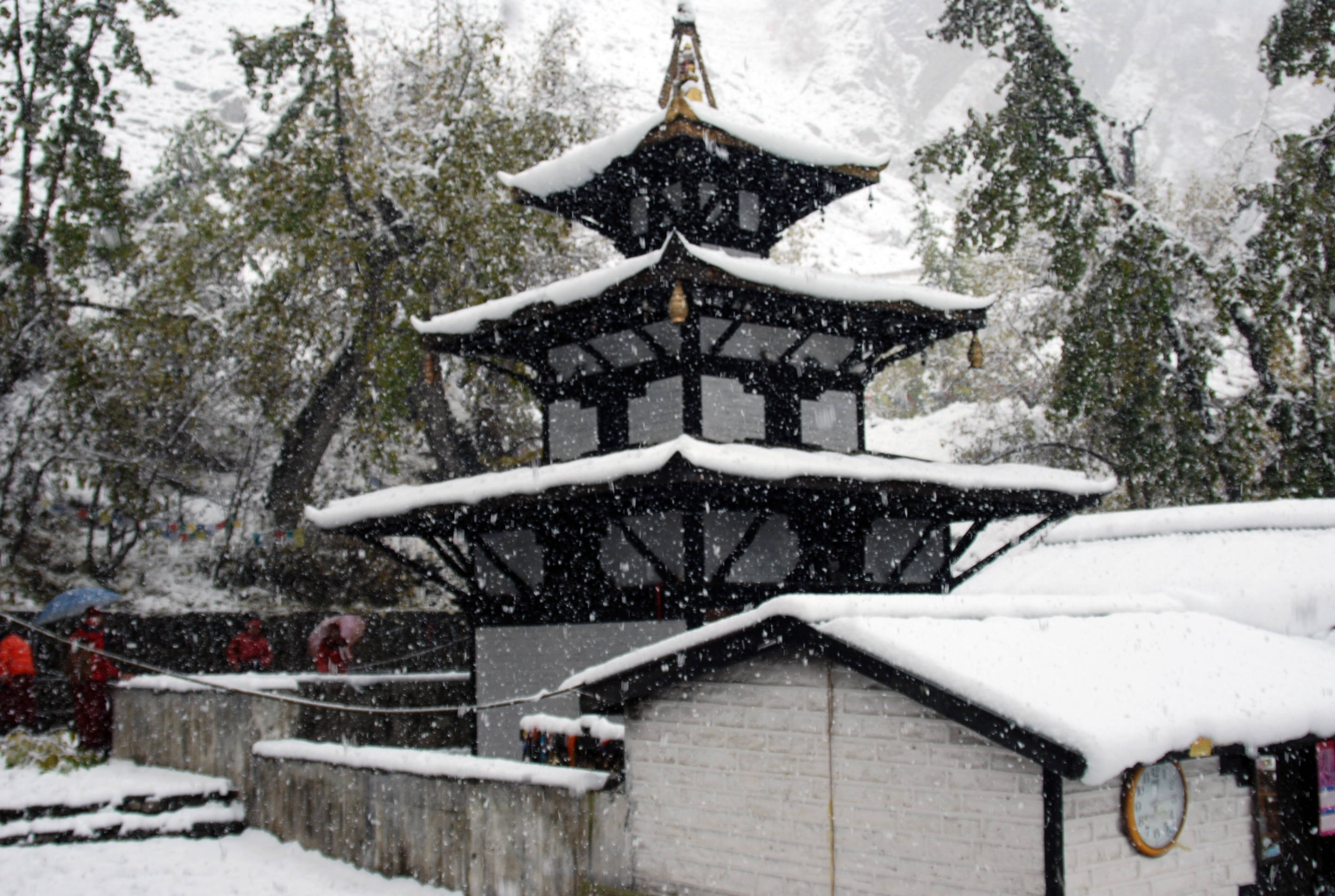
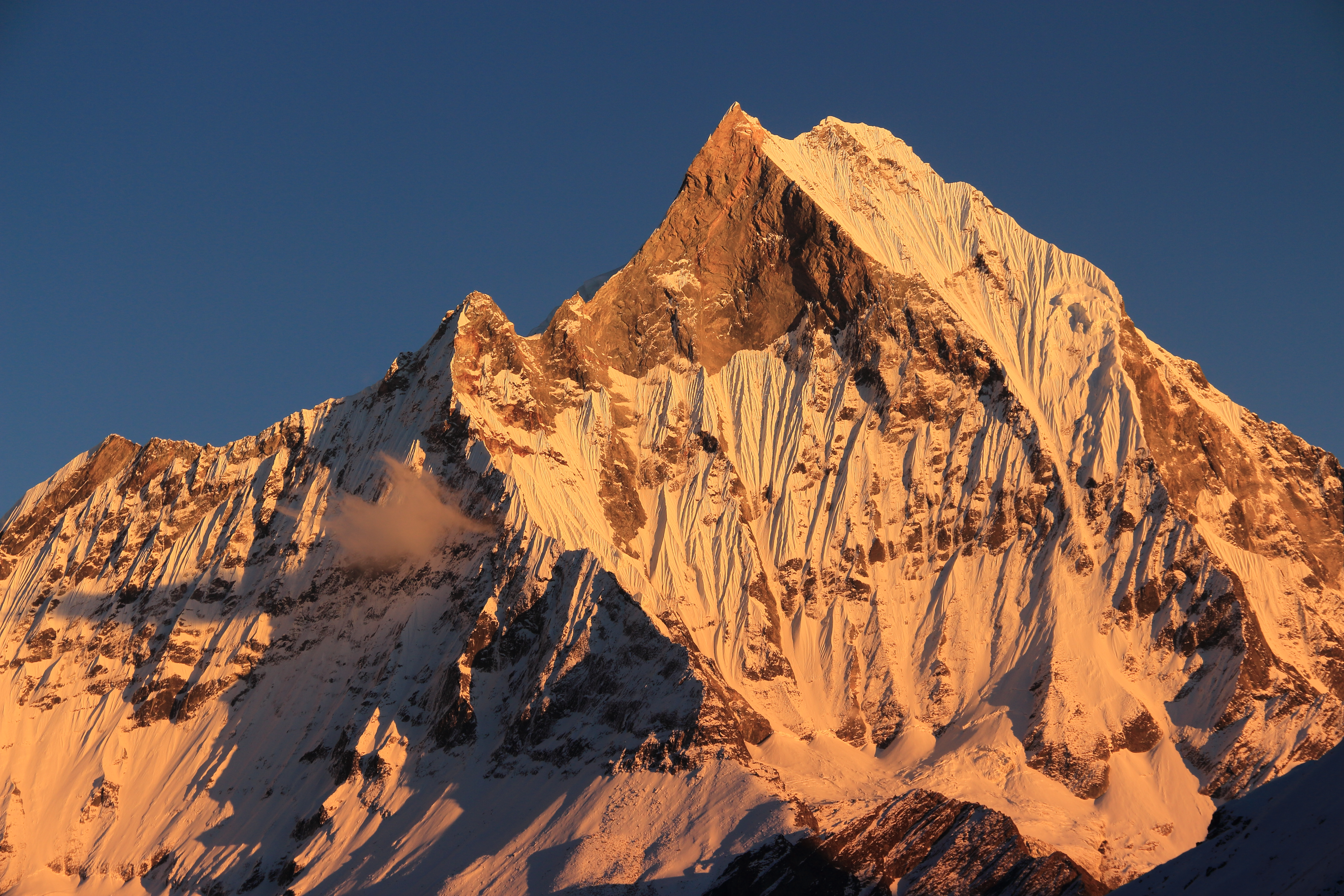
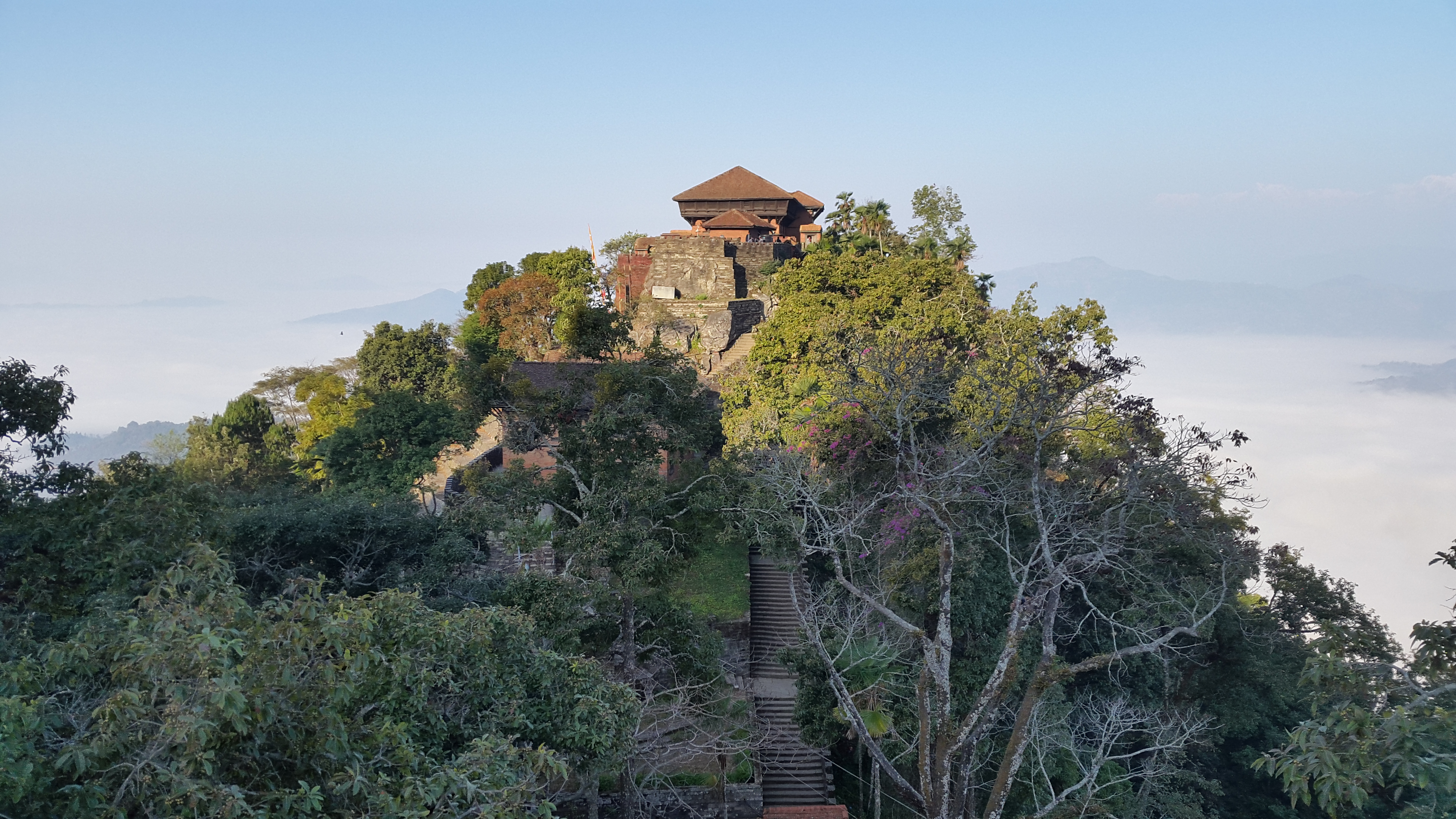
- From Top left to right Annapurna, Phewa Lake, Upper Mustang, Tilicho Lake, Manakamana Temple, Muktinath Temple, Machapuchare and Gorkha Durbar

- Seal
- Motto(s): Self-reliant and Prosperous Province: Dignified Province Dwellers.
- Location of Gandaki Province

- Map of Gandaki Province, Nepal
- Coordinates: 28°12′34″N 83°59′29″E
- Country: Nepal
- Formation: 20 September 2015
- Capital city: Pokhara
- Largest city: Pokhara
- Districts: 11

Government
  - Type: Self governing province
  - Body: Government of Gandaki Province
  - Governor: Dilli Raj Bhatta
  - Chief Minister: Surendra Raj Pandey (Congress)
  - High Court: Pokhara High Court
  - Provincial Assembly: Unicameral (60 seats)
  - Parliamentary constituencies: 18

Area
  - Total: 21,504 km^{2} (8,303 sq mi)
  - Rank: 4th
- Elevation: 2,563 m (8,409 ft)
- Highest elevation (Dhaulagiri I): 8,167 m (26,795 ft)
- Lowest elevation (Binayi Tribeni): 87 m (285 ft)

Population (2021)
  - Total: 2,466,427
  - Rank: 6th
  - Density: 114.70/km^{2} (297.06/sq mi)
  - Rank: 6th
- Time zone: UTC+5:45 (NST)
- Geocode: NP-FO
- ISO 3166 code: NP-P4
- Official language: Nepali, Magar, Gurung
- Other Official language(s): 1.Magar; 2.Gurung
- Ethnic groups: Janajati 39.12%; Khas 34.8%; Dalit 19.6%; Other 6.48%
- HDI: ▲0.638 (medium)
- HDI rank: 2nd
- Literacy: ▲83.4% (2024)
- Sex ratio: 83.84 ♂ /100 ♀ (2011)
- GDP: US$4.4 billion
- GDP rank: 5th
- Website: gandaki.gov.np

Gandaki Province (Nepali: गण्डकी प्रदेश, romanized: Gaṇḍakī pradēśa ([ɡʌɳɖʌki])) is one of the seven federal provinces established by the current constitution of Nepal which was promulgated on 20 September 2015. Pokhara is the province's capital city. It borders the Tibet Autonomous Region in Southwestern China to the north, Bagmati Province to the east, Karnali Province to the west, and Lumbini Province and Bihar in India to the south. The total area of the province is 21,733 km^{2} (8,391 sq mi), constituting 14.66% of Nepal's total area. According to the 2021 census, the population of the province was 2,479,745. The newly elected Provincial Assembly adopted Gandaki Province as the permanent name, replacing its initial name Province No. 4 on 27 April 2023. Surendra Raj Pandey is the present chief minister of Gandaki Province.

== Etymology ==
Gandaki Province was named after the river Gandaki, which is a major river in the province. This river has important links with historical Hindu civilization. The Gandaki river is mentioned in the ancient Sanskrit epic Mahabharata. It has been said that Valmiki wrote the great epic Ramayana here. It is also believed to be the birthplace of Luv & Kush. Its evolution is described in Shiva Purana, Kumarakhand, in the chapter of the killing of Shankhachuda.

== History ==
Gandaki province was once home to the Chaubisi Rajya, the 24 kings, of which Gorkha was one. From Gorkha, Prithvi Narayan Shah arose to unify all the kingdoms and expand to include all of present-day Nepal. Gandaki Province was known as "Gandak Kshetra" which was established in 1956. Gandak Kshetra was composed by grouping the then 4 districts. Those 4 districts are now divided into many districts. Gandak Kshetra had total area of 5,400 square miles (14,000 km^{2}) and total population was 12 Lakhs. The four districts were:

1. Lumbini District (Rupandehi, Parasi, Palpa)
2. Syangja District (Syangja, Nawalpur)
3. Pokhara District (Tanahun, Kaski)
4. Gorkha District (Gorkha, Lamjung, Manang)

In 1962, the administrative system was restructured again and the "Kshetras" system was cancelled. The country was restructured into 75 development districts and those districts were grouped into zones. In 1972 area of the Gandaki Province named Western Development Region. It had 3 zones and 16 districts.

== Geography ==
The province has an area of 21,773 km^{2} which is about 14.66% of the total area of Nepal. The state extends between 27°20′N–29°20′N latitude and 82°52′E–85°12′E longitude. In terms of terrain, the province is spread over the Himalayan, Hilly and Terai region of Nepal; 5,919 km^{2} (26.8%) of the area falls under the Himalayan region, 14,604 km^{2} (67.2%) of the area falls under the Hilly region and 1,310 km^{2} (6%) of the area falls under the Terai region.

Average temperatures and precipitation for selected communities in Gandaki
Location	August (°F)	August (°C)	January (°F)	January (°C)	Annual Precipitation (mm/in)
Baglung	72.1	22.3	47.5	8.6	1766.1/69.5
Besishahar	72.3	22.4	47.5	8.6	1639.6/64.6
Chapakot	60.2	20.4	46.5	9.6	1766.1/69.5
Modi	60.8	16	33.4	0.8	1094.7/43.1
Pokhara	74.8	23.8	50.4	10.2	2010.3/79.1
Waling	77.5	25.3	54.1	12.3	1962.7/84.5

== Demographics ==
As of the 2021 census, Gandaki Province has a population of 2,466,427. 6.85% of the population was under 5 years of age. Gandaki Province has a literacy rate of 81.65% and a sex ratio of 1107 females per 1000 males.

=== Ethnicity ===
Castes/ethnic groups in Gandaki Province (2021)
1. Bahun (20.0%)
2. Magar (18.8%)
3. Chhetri (13.1%)
4. Gurung (11.0%)
5. Kami (9.32%)
6. Sarki (4.58%)
7. Damai (4.12%)
8. Newar (4.11%)
9. Tamang (2.04%)
10. Tharu (1.93%)
11. Thakuri (1.70%)
12. Kumal (1.64%)
13. Bhujel (1.17%)
14. Other Hill Janjati (3.65%)
15. Others (2.77%)

Khas people are the largest ethnicity in the province, making up 53% of the population. Bahun are the largest group, making up 20% of the population. Of these Khas Dalits are 18% of the population. Hill Janjatis are the second-largest group in the province, making up 38% of the population. Of these Magars are the largest group, making up 19% of the population. Other large groups include the Gurung (11%) and Tamang (2%). Newars are 4% of the population, and Tharus are nearly 2% of the population.

=== Language ===
Languages in Gandaki Province (2021)
1. Nepali (73.4%)
2. Magar (9.60%)
3. Gurung (8.44%)
4. Tharu (1.74%)
5. Nepal Bhasha (1.53%)
6. Tamang (1.36%)
7. Others (3.94%)

Nepali is the most common mother tongue in the province with 73.39% of the population speaking Nepali as their mother tongues. The second-largest language is Magar (10%). 8.44% speak Gurung, 1.74% Tharu, 1.53% Nepal Bhasha and 1.36% Tamang. Magar is mostly spoken in Nawalpur, Syangja and Tanahun districts, while Gurung and other Tibetic languages are spoken in Gorkha, Lamjung, Kaski, Manang and Mustang districts. A small population of Tharus live in Nawalpur district.

The Language Commission of Nepal has recommended Magar, Gurung and Bhojpuri as official language in the province. The commission has also recommended Tharu, Nepal Bhasa and Tamang to be additional official languages, for specific regions and purposes in the province.

=== Religion ===
Religion in Gandaki Province (2021)
1. Hinduism (82.2%)
2. Buddhism (11.5%)
3. Christianity (2.36%)
4. Bon (2.17%)
5. Islam (0.91%)
6. Prakriti (0.67%)
7. Other or not stated (0.13%)

Hinduism is the most followed religion in the province, with 82.22% of the population identifying as Hindus. Buddhists are the largest minority population with 11.54% of the population following Buddhism and Christianity is followed by 2.36% of the population in the province. Bon is practiced by 2.17% of the population, Islam by 0.91% and Prakriti by 0.67%.

==== Administrative subdivisions ====
Gandaki province is divided into 11 districts, which are listed below. A district is administered by the head of the District Coordination Committee and the District Administration Officer. The districts are further divided into municipalities or rural municipalities. The municipalities include one metropolitan city and 26 municipalities. There are 58 rural municipalities in the province.

Districts in the province:

1. Baglung District
2. Gorkha District
3. Kaski District
4. Lamjung District
5. Manang District
6. Mustang District
7. Myagdi District
8. Nawalpur District
9. Parbat District
10. Syangja District
11. Tanahun District

Largest cities or towns in Gandaki Province Central Bureau of Statistics
Rank		District	Pop.	Rank		District	Pop.
1	Pokhara	Kaski	513,504	11	Bhanu	Tanahun	42,794
2	Kawasoti	Nawalpur	86,821	12	Putalibazar	Syangja	41,743
3	Gaindakot	Nawalpur	79,349	13	Besishahar	Lamjung	38,232
4	Vyas	Tanahun	78,939	14	Kushma	Parbat	38,101
5	Madhyabindu	Nawalpur	61,091	15	Palungtar	Gorkha	37,409
6	Devchuli	Nawalpur	58,003	16	Beni	Myagdi	32,697
7	Baglung	Baglung	56,102	17	Galyang	Syangja	31,034
8	Shuklagandaki	Tanahun	55,620	18	Galkot	Baglung	30,588
9	Gorkha	Gorkha	52,468	19	Bhimad	Tanahun	29,248
10	Waling	Syangja	50,488	20	Jaimini	Baglung	24,628

== Government and administration ==
=== History and overview ===
The Provincial Assembly of Gandaki Province is formed under Article 175 of the Constitution of Nepal 2015 which guarantees a provincial legislative for each province in the country. The first provincial elections were conducted for all seven provinces in Nepal and the elections in Gandaki Province was conducted for 60 seats to the assembly. The first meeting of the provincial assembly was held on 4 February 2018. Netra Nath Adhikari from Maoist Centre was elected as the first speaker of the provincial assembly, and Srijana Sharma from CPN (UML) as the first deputy speaker of the provincial assembly.

The Governor acts as the head of the province while the Chief Minister is the head of the provincial government. The Chief Judge of the Pokhara High Court is the head of the judiciary. The present Governor, Chief Minister and Chief Judge are Sita Kumari Poudel (governor), Surendra Raj Pandey (chief minister) and Purushottam Bhandari. The province has 60 provincial assembly constituencies and 18 federal House of Representative constituencies.

Gandaki Province has a unicameral legislature, like that of the other provinces in Nepal. The tenure of the provincial assembly is of five years. The Provincial Assembly of Gandaki Province is temporarily housed at the Urban Development Training Centre in Pokhara.

=== Gandaki Provincial Assembly ===
Further information: Gandaki Provincial Assembly

Gandaki has 36 provincial assembly seats under FPTP.

Districts	Constituencies
Gorkha District	4
Lamjung District	2
Tanahu District	4
Syangja District	4
Kaski District	6
Manang District	2
Mustang District	2
Parbat District	2
Myagdi District	2
Baglung District	4
Nawalpur District	4

=== List of assemblies ===
Election Year	Assembly	Start of term	End of term	Speaker	Chief Minister	Party
2017	1st Assembly	4 February 2018	September 2022	Netra Nath Adhikari	Prithvi Subba Gurung (Cabinet)	CPN (UML)
2017	1st Assembly	4 February 2018	September 2022	Netra Nath Adhikari	Krishna Chandra Nepali Pokharel (Cabinet)	Nepali Congress
2022	2nd Assembly	2 January 2023	27 April 2023	Krishna Dhital	Khagaraj Adhikari (Cabinet)	CPN (UML)
2022	2nd Assembly	27 April 2023	Incumbent	Krishna Dhital	Surendra Raj Pandey cabinet (Cabinet)	Nepali Congress

=== Committees ===
Article 195 of the Constitution of Nepal provides provincial assemblies the power to form special committees in order to manage working procedures.

S.No.	Committee	Membership
1	Work Arrangement Advisory	11
2	Legislative	13
3	Public Accounts	13
4	Finance and Development	14
5	Provincial Affairs	11

=== Current composition ===
Party	Parliamentary party leader	Seats
Nepali Congress	Surendra Raj Pandey	27
CPN (UML)	Khagaraj Adhikari	22
CPN (Maoist Centre)	Hari Bahadur Chuman	8
Rastriya Prajatantra Party	Pancha Ram Gurung	2
CPN (Unified Socialist)	Fanindra Devkota	1
Total		60

== Economy ==
The economy of the province is largely dependent on tourism.

== Infrastructure ==
=== Roadways ===
9 out of 11 districts of Gandaki Province are connected via surfaced roads. Road connections to Mustang and Manang are unsurfaced and can be impassable during the rainy season. Siddhartha Highway connects Lumbini to Gandaki. The highway starts at the Nepal-India Border in Siddharthanagar and terminates at Prithivi chowk, Pokhara. The major settlements on the highway are Siddharthanagar, Butwal, Tansen, Waling, Putalibazar, Syangja, and Pokhara.

The Kali Gandaki Corridor passes through the province as well.

=== Airways ===
Here are the lists of domestic and international airport in the province.

==== Current airports ====
- Pokhara International Airport (PKR/VNPK & VNPR): Operates both International as well as domestic flights.
- Pokhara Airport (old), which continues to operate flights to Mustang and also offers ultra-light aircraft services.
- Manang Airport (NGX/VNMA)
- Jomsom Airport (JMO/VNGS)
- Dhorpatan Airport VNDR
- Baglung Airport

==== Former airport ====
- Palungtar Airport GKH- VNGK

== See also ==
- Provinces of Nepal
- List of districts in Nepal
