= Surendra Raj Pandey =

Nepali politician

Honourable Surendra Raj Pandey MPA
- सुरेन्द्र राज पाण्डे

4th Chief Minister of Gandaki Province
- Incumbent
- Assumed office 29 May 2024
- President: Ram Chandra Poudel
- Governor: Dilli Raj Bhatta
- Preceded by: Khagaraj Adhikari
- In office 27 April 2023 – 3 April 2024
- President: Ram Chandra Poudel
- Governor: Prithvi Man Gurung; Dilli Raj Bhatta
- Preceded by: Khagaraj Adhikari
- Succeeded by: Khagaraj Adhikari

Leader of Opposition in National Assembly
- In office 2018–2020
- President: Bidya Devi Bhandari
- Prime Minister: KP Sharma Oli
- Succeeded by: Ramesh Jung Rayamajhi

Member of Rastriya Sabha
- In office 2018–2020
- Preceded by: Post created
- Succeeded by: Narayan Kaji Shrestha
- Constituency: Gandaki Province

Member of the Gandaki Provincial Assembly
- Incumbent
- Assumed office 28 December 2022
- Preceded by: Prakash Chandra Dawadi
- Constituency: Gorkha 2(B)

Personal details
- Born: Khoplang, Gorkha
- Party: Nepali Congress

Surendra Raj Pandey (Nepali: सुरेन्द्र राज पाण्डे) is a Nepalese politician belonging to Nepali Congress. He is the current chief minister of Gandaki Province and was appointed to the post on May 29, 2024. Pandey is the Parliamentary Party leader of the Nepali Congress in the province and is member of from Gorkha 2(B). Pandey has previously served as Leader of the Opposition in the National Assembly. He is also the Central Working Committee member of Nepali Congress.

== Electoral history ==
=== 2022 Nepalese provincial elections ===
Gorkha 2(B)
Party	Candidate	Votes
Nepali Congress	Surendra Raj Pandey	16,882
CPN (UML)	Basanta Kumar Gurung	5,767
Others/Invalid		3,556
Result	Congress hold	
Source: Election Commission

== See also ==
- Surendra Raj Pandey cabinet
- Dilli Bahadur Chaudhary
- Kamal Bahadur Shah

Political offices
Preceded by Khagaraj Adhikari	Chief Minister of Gandaki Province; 2023-	Succeeded by incumbent
