= Lamjung 1 =

Parliamentary constituency in Nepal

- Parliamentary constituency for the House of Representatives
- Lajung 1 in Gandaki Province

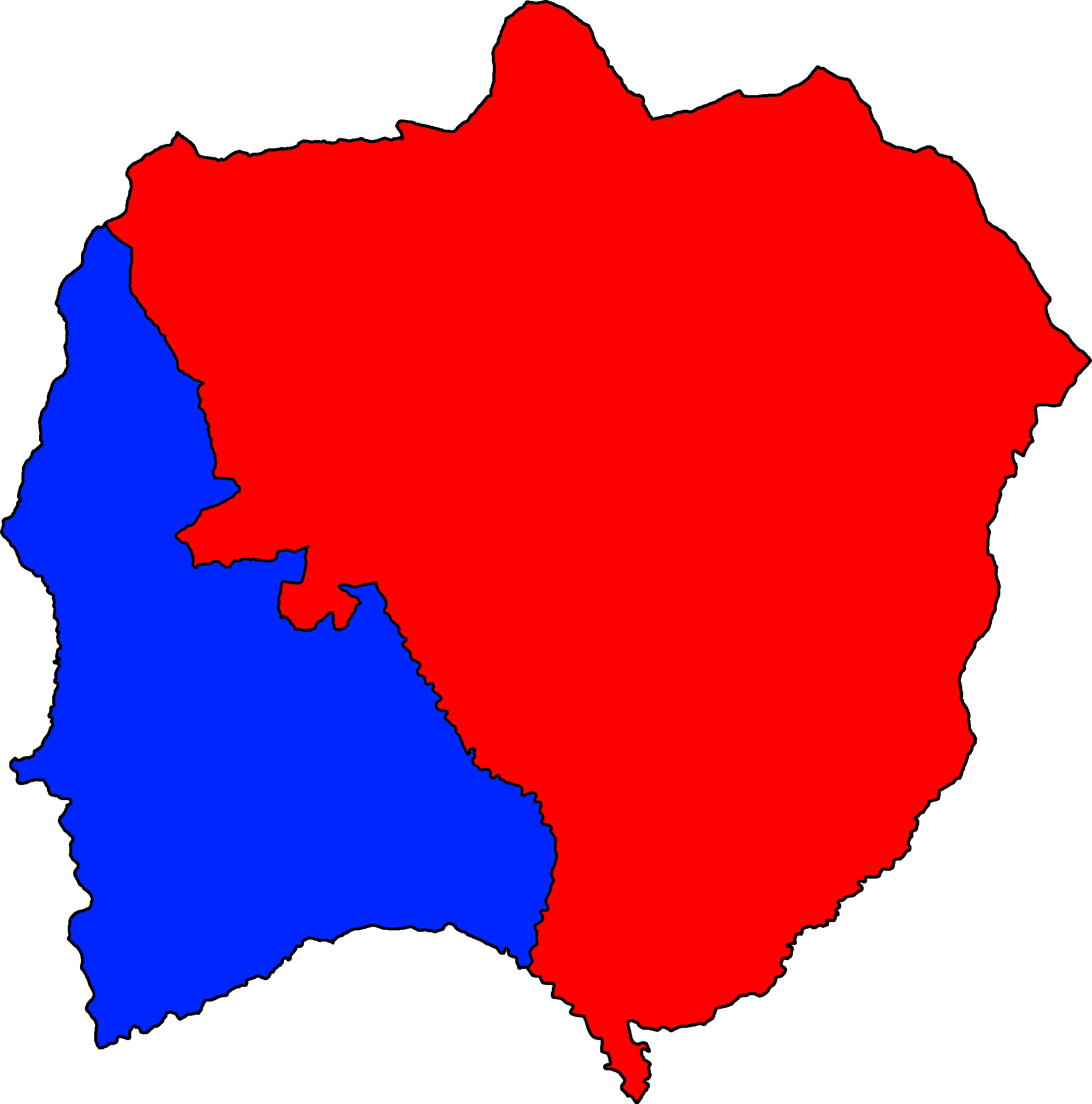
- Assembly segments Lamjung 1(A) and Lamjung 1(B) within Lamjung District
- Province: Gandaki Province
- District: Lamjung District
- Electorate: 115,449

Current constituency
- Created: 1991
- MP: Dharmaraj K.C. (RSP)
- Gandaki MPA 1(A): Dhananjaya Dawadi (NCP)
- Gandaki MPA 1(B): Prithvi Subba Gurung (NCP)

Lamjung 1 is the parliamentary constituency of Lamjung District in Nepal. This constituency came into existence on the Constituency Delimitation Commission (CDC) report submitted on 31 August 2017.

== Incorporated areas ==
Lamjung 1 incorporates the entirety of Lamjung District.

== Assembly segments ==
It encompasses the following Gandaki Provincial Assembly segment

- Lamjung 1(A)
- Lamjung 1(B)

== Members of Parliament ==
=== Parliament/Constituent Assembly ===
Election	Member	Party
1991	Ram Chandra Adhikari	Nepali Congress
1999	Ram Bahadur Gurung	Nepali Congress
2008	Budhhi Ram Gurung	CPN (Maoist)
January 2009	Budhhi Ram Gurung	UCPN (Maoist)
2013	Jamindraman Ghale	CPN (Unified Marxist–Leninist)
2017	Dev Prasad Gurung	CPN (Maoist Centre)
May 2018	Dev Prasad Gurung	Nepal Communist Party
March 2021	Dev Prasad Gurung	CPN (Maoist Centre)
2022	Prithvi Subba Gurung	CPN (Unified Marxist–Leninist)
2026	Dharmaraj K.C.	Rastriya Swatantra Party

=== Provincial Assembly ===
==== 1(A) ====
Election	Member	Party
2017	Dhananjaya Dawadi	CPN (Unified Marxist-Leninist)
May 2018	Dhananjaya Dawadi	Nepal Communist Party

==== 1(B) ====
Election	Member	Party
2017	Prithvi Subba Gurung	CPN (Unified Marxist-Leninist)
May 2018	Prithvi Subba Gurung	Nepal Communist Party

== Election results ==
=== Election in the 2020s ===
==== 2022 general election ====
Candidate	Party	Votes	%
Prithvi Subba Gurung	CPN (UML)	34,985	44.94
Dev Prasad Gurung	CPN (Maoist Centre)	31,791	40.84
Dharma Raj K.C.	Rastriya Swatantra Party	9,033	11.60
Bal Chandra Shrestha	Rastriya Prajatantra Party	1,234	1.59
Others		798	1.03
Total		77,841	100.00
Majority		3,194	
CPN (UML) gain			

==== 2022 provincial election ====
===== 1(A) =====
Candidate	Party	Votes	%
Takraj Gurung	Nepali Congress	18,514	49.44
Jamindra Man Ghale	CPN (UML)	17,345	46.32
Apsara Shah	Rastriya Prajatantra Party	1,018	2.72
Others	571	1.52	
Total		37,448	100.00
Majority		1,169	
Nepali Congress			

===== 1(B) =====
Candidate	Party	Votes	%
Bhesh Bahadur Paudel	Nepali Congress	19,560	47.68
Krishna Prasad Adhikari	CPN (UML)	18,810	45.85
Tat Bahadur Gurung	Rastriya Prajatantra Party	1,957	4.77
Others	700	1.71	
Total		41,027	100.00
Majority		750	
Nepali Congress			

=== Election in the 2010s ===
==== 2017 legislative elections ====
Party	Candidate	Votes
CPN (Maoist Centre)	Dev Prasad Gurung	39,468
Nepali Congress	Dil Bahadur Gharti	31,067
Janasamajbadi Party Nepal	Nirajan Kunwar	1,406
Others		2,639
Invalid votes		2,585
Result	Maoist Centre gain	
Source: Election Commission

==== 2017 Nepalese provincial elections ====
===== 1(A) =====
Party	Candidate	Votes
CPN (Unified Marxist–Leninist)	Dhananjaya Dawadi	20,265
Nepali Congress	Garja Bahadur Gurung	13,853
Others		1,279
Invalid votes		1,474
Result	CPN (UML) gain	
Source: Election Commission

===== 1(B) =====
Party	Candidate	Votes
CPN (Unified Marxist–Leninist)	Prithvi Subba Gurung	23,088
Nepali Congress	Krishna Prasad Koirala	15,102
Others		1,257
Invalid votes		878
Result	CPN (UML) gain	
Source: Election Commission

==== 2013 Constituent Assembly election ====
Party	Candidate	Votes
CPN (Unified Marxist–Leninist)	Jamindraman Ghale	11,309
Nepali Congress	Dr. Tek Raj Gurung	10,411
UCPN (Maoist)	Devendra Parajuli	6,355
Rastriya Prajatantra Party	Hem Jang Gurung	2,253
Others		1,536
Result	CPN (UML) gain	
Source: NepalNews

=== Election in the 2000s ===
==== 2008 Constituent Assembly election ====
Party	Candidate	Votes
CPN (Maoist)	Budhhi Ram Gurung	21,044
Nepali Congress	Tulsi Narayan Shrestha	10,532
CPN (Unified Marxist–Leninist)	Maya Nath Adhikari	9,186
Rastriya Prajatantra Party	Tek Bahadur Gurung	1,490
Others		670
Invalid votes		1,401
Result	Maoist gain	
Source: Election Commission

=== Election in the 1990s ===
==== 1999 legislative elections ====
Party	Candidate	Votes
Nepali Congress	Ram Bahadur Gurung	16,605
CPN (Unified Marxist–Leninist)	Maya Nath Adhikari	14,352
Rastriya Prajatantra Party	Hem Jang Gurung	2,471
Rastriya Prajatantra Party (Chand)	Jagat Bahadur Gurung	2,377
CPN (Marxist–Leninist)	Bijay Raj Joshi	1,704
Others		525
Invalid Votes		1,094
Result	Congress hold	
Source: Election Commission

==== 1994 legislative elections ====
Party	Candidate	Votes
Nepali Congress	Ram Chandra Adhikari	13,223
CPN (Unified Marxist–Leninist)	Keshav Lal Shrestha	9,729
Independent	Hem Jang Gurung Lekali	6,637
Independent	Tulsi Narayan Shrestha	1,758
Result	Congress hold	
Source: Election Commission

==== 1991 legislative elections ====
Party	Candidate	Votes
Nepali Congress	Ram Chandra Adhikari	16,678
Samyukta Jana Morcha Nepal		10,789
Result	Congress gain	

== See also ==
- List of parliamentary constituencies of Nepal
