= Khagaraj Adhikari =

Nepali politician

Honourable Khagaraaj Adhikari MPA
- खगराज अधिकारी
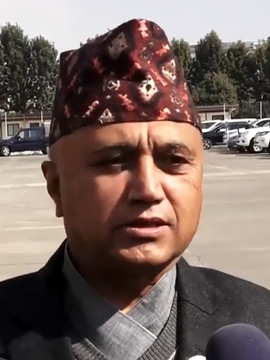

3rd Chief Minister of Gandaki Province
- In office 10 January 2023 – 23 April 2023
- Governor: Prithvi Man Gurung
- Preceded by: Krishna Chandra Nepali Pokharel
- Succeeded by: Surendra Raj Pandey

Minister of Home Affairs
- In office 10 June 2021 – 22 June 2021
- President: Bidya Devi Bhandari
- Prime Minister: Khadga Prasad Sharma Oli
- Preceded by: Ram Bahadur Thapa
- Succeeded by: Bishnu Prasad Paudel

Minister of Health and Population of Nepal
- In office 25 February 2014 – 12 October 2015
- President: Ram Baran Yadav
- Prime Minister: Sushil Koirala
- Succeeded by: Ram Janam Chaudhary

Member of Parliament, Pratinidhi Sabha
- In office 4 March 2018 – 18 September 2022
- Preceded by: Yagya Bahadur Thapa
- Succeeded by: Man Bahadur Gurung
- Constituency: Kaski 1
- In office October 1994 – May 1999
- Preceded by: Taranath Ranabhat
- Succeeded by: Taranath Ranabhat
- Constituency: Kaski 1

Member of the Gandaki Provincial Assembly
- Incumbent
- Assumed office 28 December 2022
- Preceded by: Dipak Koirala
- Constituency: Kaski 1 (A)

Personal details
- Born: 26 March 1962 (age 64)
- Party: Communist Party of Nepal (Unified Marxist–Leninist)

Khagaraj Adhikari (Nepali: खगराज अधिकारी) is a Nepalese politician who formerly served as a Minister of Home Affairs of Government of Nepal. He became a minister on 4 June 2021 but was removed from the post by the Supreme Court on 22 June 2021, making his tenure of just 18 days the shortest tenure till date. He is a member of Communist Party of Nepal (Unified Marxist-Leninist), He also assumed the post of the Minister of Health and Population of Nepal on 25 February 2014 under Sushil Koirala-led government. He is mostly known for launching Government Health insurance plan.

== Books ==
An autobiography of Adhikari Maya Mareko Manchhe was published in 2014 co-authored with Shikhar Ghimirey.
