= Communist Party of Nepal (Unified Marxist–Leninist) =

Political party in Nepal

Communist Party of Nepal (Unified Marxist–Leninist) नेपाल कम्युनिष्ट पार्टी (एकीकृत मार्क्सवादी-लेनिनवादी) Nepāla Kamyuniṣṭa Pārṭī (Ekīkṛta Mārksavādī-Leninavādī)
- Abbreviation: CPN (UML)
- Chairman: K. P. Sharma Oli
- General Secretary: Shankar Pokhrel
- Vice-chairman: Prithvi Subba Gurung; Bishnu Prasad Paudel; Ram Bahadur Thapa; Gokarna Bista; Raghuji Pant
- Parliamentary leader: Ram Bahadur Thapa
- Deputy General Secretary: Lekh Raj Bhatta; Raghubir Mahaseth; Yogesh Bhattarai
- Secretary: Mahesh Basnet; Padma Kumari Aryal; Chhabilal Bishwakarma; Sher Dhan Rai; Hikmat Kumar Karki; Khagaraj Adhikari; Yam Lal Kandel; Rajan Bhattarai; Bhanu Bhakta Dhakal
- Founded: 6 January 1991; 35 years ago (first iteration); 8 March 2021; 5 years ago (second iteration)
- Dissolved: 17 May 2018; 8 years ago (first iteration)
- Merger of: CPN (Marxist); CPN (Marxist–Leninist)
- Headquarters: Thapathali, Kathmandu
- Newspaper: Nawayug
- Student wing: ANNFSU
- Youth wing: Youth Federation Nepal
- Women's wing: All Nepal Women's Association
- Labour wing: GEFONT
- Membership: 650,000 (2025)
- Ideology: Communism (Nepali); Marxism–Leninism; People's Multiparty Democracy
- Political position: Far-left (de jure); Centre-left to left-wing (de facto)
- International affiliation: IMCWP
- Colours: Red
- ECN Status: National Party (3rd largest)
- House of Representatives: 25 / 275
- National Assembly: 11 / 59
- Provincial Assemblies: 163 / 550
- Chief Ministers: 3 / 7
- Mayors/Chairs: 206 / 753
- Councillors: 11,890 / 35,011

Election symbol

Party flag

Website
- www.cpnuml.org

The Communist Party of Nepal (Unified Marxist–Leninist) (Note: Nepali: नेपाल कम्युनिष्ट पार्टी (एकीकृत मार्क्सवादी-लेनिनवादी), romanized: Nēpāl Kamyuniṣṭ Pārṭī (Ēkīkṛt Mārksavādī-Lēninavādī)) (CPN (UML)) is a Marxist-Leninist party political party in Nepal. The party emerged as one of the major parties in Nepal after the end of the Panchayat era.

K. P. Sharma Oli has been serving as party chairman since the party's ninth general convention in 2014. The party currently holds 79 seats in the House of Representatives, having won 26.95% of the party list votes in the 2022 general election and is the second largest parliamentary group. There have been four prime ministers from the party while the party has led the government six times with the most recent Oli government which was deposed by 2025 Nepalese Gen Z protests.

CPN (UML) was the main opposition in 1991 after the first election following the restoration of multi-party democracy. The party led a minority government under Man Mohan Adhikari following the 1994 election. The party joined a coalition government with the Communist Party of Nepal (Maoist Centre) in 2008 in the first elections after the end of the monarchy in Nepal and led two governments under Madhav Kumar Nepal and Jhala Nath Khanal during the term of the 1st Nepalese Constituent Assembly. The party also led the first government after the promulgation of the new constitution with K. P. Sharma Oli serving as prime minister. Oli again served as prime minister following the 2017 election.

The party was formed in January 1991 after the merger of the Communist Party of Nepal (Marxist) and the Communist Party of Nepal (Marxist–Leninist). The party merged with CPN (Maoist Centre) to form the Nepal Communist Party on 17 May 2018 but the new party was dissolved and CPN (UML) was revived by a Supreme Court decision on 8 March 2021. The party claimed to have 650,000 members as of August 2025, down from 855,000 in December 2021.

In 2025, the party faced a wave of criticism, including from many other Nepali Marxist-Leninist groups, for accusations of engaging in mass nepotism, brutalizing protesters, backsliding democracy, banning social media and becoming the new elite it once overthrew. Its Chairman, K. P. Sharma Oli, resigned and dissolved the cabinet, as per protest demands. Later the parliament was dissolved for a fresh mandate.

== History ==
The predecessors of the CPN (UML) were the CPN (Marxist) led by former general secretary of the Communist Party of Nepal, Man Mohan Adhikari, and CPN (Marxist–Leninist), led by Madan Bhandari. CPN (Marxist) was the successor to CPN (Pushpa Lal) which was founded by the founding general secretary of the Communist Party of Nepal, Pushpa Lal Shrestha. CPN (Marxist–Leninist) had its origins in the 1969 Jhapa rebellion. The conflict took its inspiration from the Naxalite movement in India and began after land reform programs were introduced by King Mahendra in 1964.

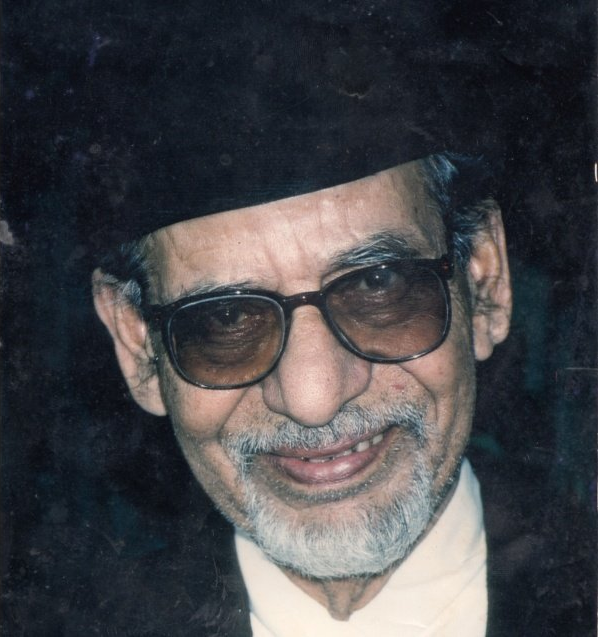
Man Mohan Adhikari, first party chairman and first UML prime minister (1994–1995).

The two parties were constituents of the United Left Front, which was formed in 1990 to protest against the Panchayat system. The front, along with the Nepali Congress, helped restore multi party democracy in the country after the 1990 revolution. On 6 January 1991, ahead of the 1991 general election, the first parliamentary elections in the country in three decades, the two parties merged to form the Communist Party of Nepal (Unified Marxist–Leninist) with Adhikari serving as the party's first chairman.

=== Post-Jana Andolan (1991–2002) ===
In the 1991 election, the party won 69 out of 205 seats in the House of Representatives and was the second largest parliamentary group. Man Mohan Adhikari was elected as the parliamentary party leader and became the Leader of the Opposition. The fifth party congress was held in Kathmandu in January 1993 and People's Multiparty Democracy was adopted as the party line. The congress also elected Adhikari as the party chairman and Madan Bhandari as the general secretary. Later in the year however, Bhandari along with Jibaraj Ashrit died in a vehicle accident in Chitwan and Madhav Kumar Nepal became general secretary. In November 1993, veteran communist leader Tulsi Lal Amatya's group merged with the party.

Following the 1994 election, the party became the largest parliamentary group, winning 88 out of 205 seats and forming the first CPN (UML) government. Man Mohan Adhikari became prime minister and formed a minority government with the support of Rastriya Prajatantra Party and Nepal Sadbhawana Party, which lasted nine months. Adhikari recommended dissolving the House of Representatives, and called for new elections after losing the support of his coalition partners, but the move was dismissed by the Supreme Court after a legal challenge by Nepali Congress. In 1997, the party supported the minority government of Rastriya Prajatantra Party, which lasted for seven months. Following disagreements about the Mahakali treaty, the party faced a split in March 1998. Bam Dev Gautam reconstituted the CPN (Marxist–Leninist) with 46 MPs from the party. In December 1998, the party supported the Nepali Congress–Nepal Sadbhawana Party government which was created to hold the 1999 election.

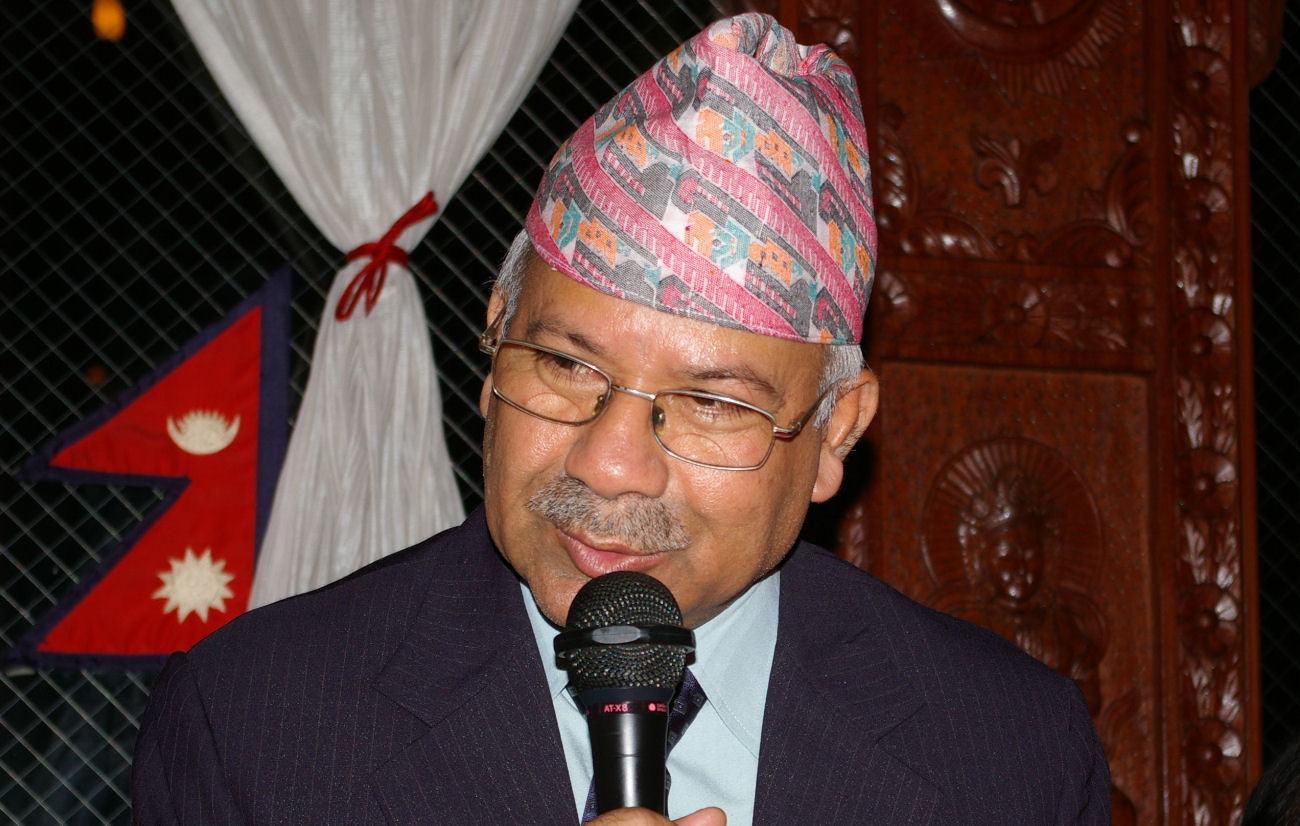
Madhav Kumar Nepal, Prime Minister (2009–2011)

The Nepali Congress formed a majority government following the 1999 election and the CPN (UML) became the main opposition winning 70 seats. Following party chairman Adhikari's death in 1999, general secretary Madhav Kumar Nepal became the leader of the party. CPN (Burma) merged into the party on 28 June 2001 and CPN (Marxist–Leninist) reunified with the party on 15 February 2002. A group led by C. P. Mainali opposed the unification and opted to reconstitute the party. The party held its seventh general convention in February 2003 in Janakpur. Nepal was reelected as the general secretary and the post of party chair, which had remained vacant after the death of Adhikari, was abolished.

=== Jana Andolan II (2002–2007) ===
The House of Representatives was dismissed by King Gyanendra on 22 May 2002 on the request of prime minister Sher Bahadur Deuba. After the Deuba government failed to hold elections and to control the Maoist insurgency, he was dismissed by the king in October with the king assuming executive powers to the protest of political parties including CPN (UML). In June 2003, general secretary Nepal was proposed as prime minister by the protesting parties but this was ignored by the king and Surya Bahdur Thapa was appointed instead. After Thapa's resignation in May 2004, Deuba was reappointed as the prime minister. CPN (UML) also joined the cabinet with Bharat Mohan Adhikari serving as deputy prime minister.

On 1 February 2005, King Gyanendra declared a national emergency, placed all leading politicians under house arrest and assumed chairmanship of a 10-member council of ministers. CPN (UML), along with other parties in the dissolved lower house, formed the Seven Party Alliance to end the king's direct rule, reinstate the dissolved House of Representatives and form an all-party government. The alliance also opened talks with the CPN (Maoist) to end their armed insurgency and join mainstream politics. On 22 November 2002, the alliance signed a 12-point agreement with the Maoists to end the insurgency, abolish the monarchy and restore democratic rule to the country. Following the 2006 revolution on 24 April, King Gyanendra restored the House of Representatives and an all-party government was formed under the leadership of Girija Prasad Koirala. Later that year on 21 November, the Comprehensive Peace Accord was signed between the Maoists and the Seven Party Alliance which ended the Civil War.

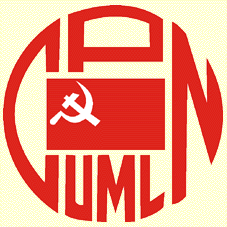
Former logo of CPN (UML)

=== Constituent Assembly (2008–2017) ===
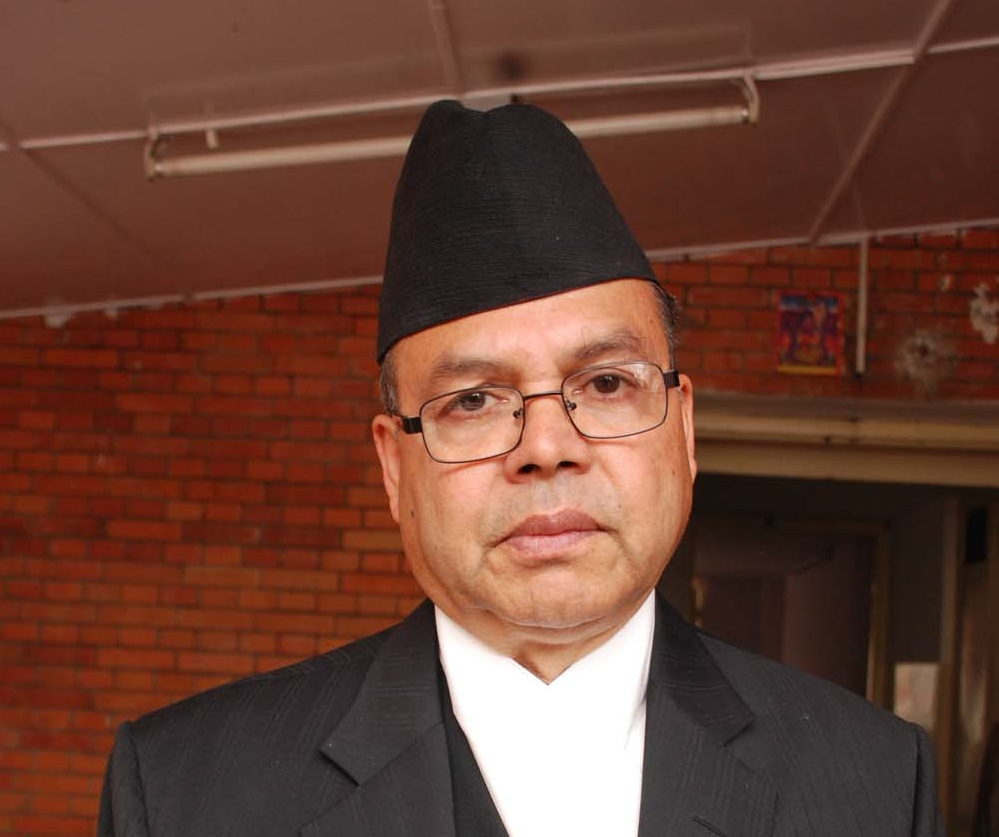
Jhala Nath Khanal, Prime Minister (2011)

In the 2008 election, the party won 108 out of 575 seats in the Constituent Assembly. The party lost most of their leftist vote to the CPN (Maoist) and general secretary Madhav Kumar Nepal resigned following his defeat in both of his constituencies and was replaced by Jhala Nath Khanal. The party joined the coalition government with CPN (Maoist) following the election. The party's eighth general convention in February 2009 elected Khanal as the party chairman and Ishwor Pokhrel as general secretary. Following the controversial sacking of Army Chief of Staff Rookmangud Katawal, CPN (UML) withdrew its support from the Maoist government. In November 2009, Madhav Kumar Nepal, who was nominated to the Constituent Assembly, became prime minister with the support of Nepali Congress and Madheshi Jana Adhikar Forum, Nepal. His government lasted for seven months before he resigned following a political deadlock amid failure to draft the new constitution. Following seven months of political stalemate party chairman Jhalanath Khanal was elected as prime minister in February 2011 with support from the UCPN (Maoist). He resigned six months later in August after failing to reach consensus on drafting the new constitution and completing the peace process following which the party supported the new UCPN (Maoist) government. In November 2012, ahead of the new election, Ashok Kumar Rai broke away from the party along with other indigenous leaders and formed the Federal Socialist Party, claiming that the party failed to address their concerns during the discussions for promulgation of the constitution.

In the 2013 election, the party became the second largest party winning 175 out of 575 elected seats. The party joined the coalition government under the Nepali Congress following the election with Bam Dev Gautam serving as deputy prime minister. At the party's ninth general convention in July 2014, K. P. Sharma Oli became party chair after defeating Madhav Kumar Nepal, while Ishwar Pokhrel was reelected as general secretary. After the new constitution was delivered by the coalition government, party chair K. P. Sharma Oli was elected as prime minister on 12 October 2015 with the support of UCPN (Maoist), Rastriya Prajatantra Party Nepal and other parties. After the Maoists withdrew their support, Oli resigned in July 2016 ahead of a no-confidence vote.

Former logo of the party

=== Left alliance and dissolution (2017–2021) ===
In the 2017 local elections, 14,099 councilors, including 294 municipal mayors and rural chairs, were elected from the party to local governments. Candidates for the party were elected as mayors in major cities, including the two largest cities Kathmandu and Pokhara Lekhnath. The party announced an alliance with the CPN (Maoist Centre) before the 2017 legislative and provincial elections. The party won 121 seats, becoming the largest party in the House of Representatives, and became the largest party in six of Nepal's seven provinces. After the election, the party maintained its alliance with the CPN (Maoist Centre) and formed coalition governments in the centre and six of the seven provinces. The CPN (UML) led governments in Province 1, Province 3, Province 4 and Province 5. In accordance with the agreement Sher Dhan Rai, Dormani Poudel, Prithvi Subba Gurung and Shankar Pokharel were appointed as chief ministers of their respective provinces.

In the 6 February 2018 National Assembly election, the CPN (UML) won 27 of 56 contested seats and became the largest party in both houses. Party chairman Oli was elected the party's parliamentary leader in the House of Representatives and was appointed prime minister on February 15. Bidya Devi Bhandari was re-elected president on March 13. After eight months of planning, the Unification Coordination Committee met to finalize plans for the merger of Nepal's biggest left-wing parties. On 17 May 2018, the party was dissolved and a new party, the Nepal Communist Party was formed from the CPN (UML) and the CPN (Maoist Centre).

=== Revival (2021–2025) ===
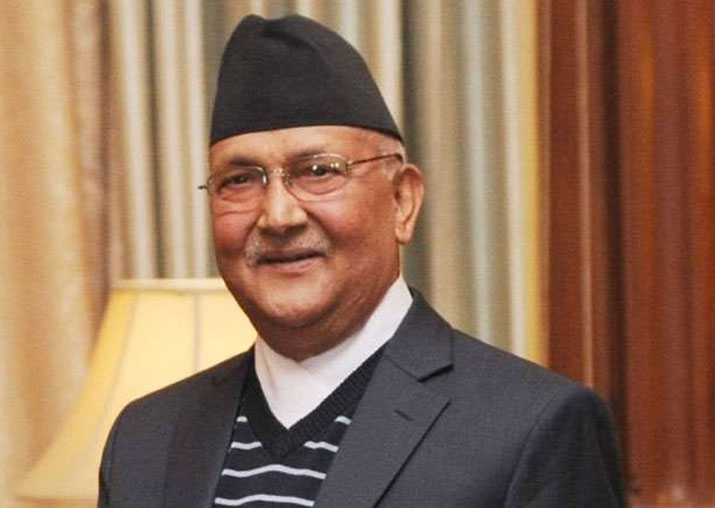
K. P. Sharma Oli, Prime Minister (2015–2016 and 2018–2021)

On 8 March 2021, the Supreme Court ruled that the name Nepal Communist Party belonged to the minor party led by Rishiram Kattel and the merger of the two parties was voided. The following day, the Election Commission formally split the party and the CPN (UML) was revived. Four members of the House of Representatives and one member of the National Assembly for CPN (Maoist Centre) also defected to CPN (UML) during the split but were dismissed as parliamentarians following their defection. K. P. Sharma Oli lost a no-confidence motion on 9 May 2021 but was reappointed as prime minister four days later after the opposition failed to prove a majority. Chief minister of Gandaki, Prithvi Subba Gurung, resigned before a no-confidence motion and chief Minister of Lumbini, Shankar Pokharel, also lost a no-confidence motion but were similarly reappointed after the opposition failed to prove their majority.

A cabinet meeting chaired by prime minister and party chairman K. P. Sharma Oli recommended that the president dissolve the House of Representatives on 22 May 2021 after members of his party, led by former prime ministers Madhav Kumar Nepal and Jhala Nath Khanal, supported Nepali Congress leader Sher Bahadur Deuba as the next prime minister. The Supreme Court reinstated the House of Representatives on 12 July 2021 and Oli resigned from his post the next day. Twenty-two members of the CPN (UML) voted for Deuba during his confidence vote, defying the party whip. The party also lost its government in Gandaki and Lumbini Provinces, with Gurung losing a no-confidence motion and Pokharel resigning. Province 1 chief minister, Sher Dhan Rai, and Bagmati chief minister Dormani Poudel were replaced in August of that year after losing support within their parliamentary party. They were replaced by Bhim Acharya and Astalaxmi Shakya respectively who were elected by the parliamentary party.

On 25 August 2021, former prime ministers Madhav Kumar Nepal and Jhala Nath Khanal split from the party along with 55 members of the Central Committee, 25 members of the House of Representatives and seven members of the National Assembly and formed the CPN (Unified Socialist). Other leaders also broke away from the party, with Hridayesh Tripathi forming the People's Progressive Party and former vice-chairman Bam Dev Gautam forming the CPN (Unity National Campaign). Following the split, the party lost its majority in Bagmati and Province 1 and Shakya and Acharya resigned following which the party was in opposition in all seven provinces. The 10th National Convention of the party was held in Chitwan between 26 and 29 November 2021 with K. P. Sharma Oli being reelected as the party chair.

In the 2022 local elections, 11,929 councillors were elected from the party, including 206 mayors and rural chairs. The party lost their mayoral seats in Kathmandu and Pokhara and failed to win the mayoral elections in any of the six metropolitan cities in the country. The party formed electoral pacts with the People's Socialist Party, Rastriya Prajatantra Party and other minor parties to contest the 2022 general and provincial elections. Former deputy prime minister and Rastriya Prajatantra Party Nepal chair, Kamal Thapa, also contested the election under the party's electoral symbol. At the 2022 general election, the party won 79 seats and became the second largest parliamentary party. The party also emerged as the largest party in provincial assemblies in Province 1, Madhesh and Lumbini at the 2022 provincial elections.

The party backed CPN (Maoist Centre) chairman Pushpa Kamal Dahal's bid to become prime minister and joined a coalition government under him on 26 December 2022, with Bishnu Prasad Paudel joining the cabinet as deputy prime minister. However, the coalition lasted less than two months. In March 2024, the party again supported CPN (Maoist Centre)'s coalition before withdrawing support for the government in July later that year. Party chairman K. P. Sharma Oli was appointed as prime minister for the fourth time with the support of Nepali Congress on 15 July 2024.

=== Gen-Z protests, 2025–present ===
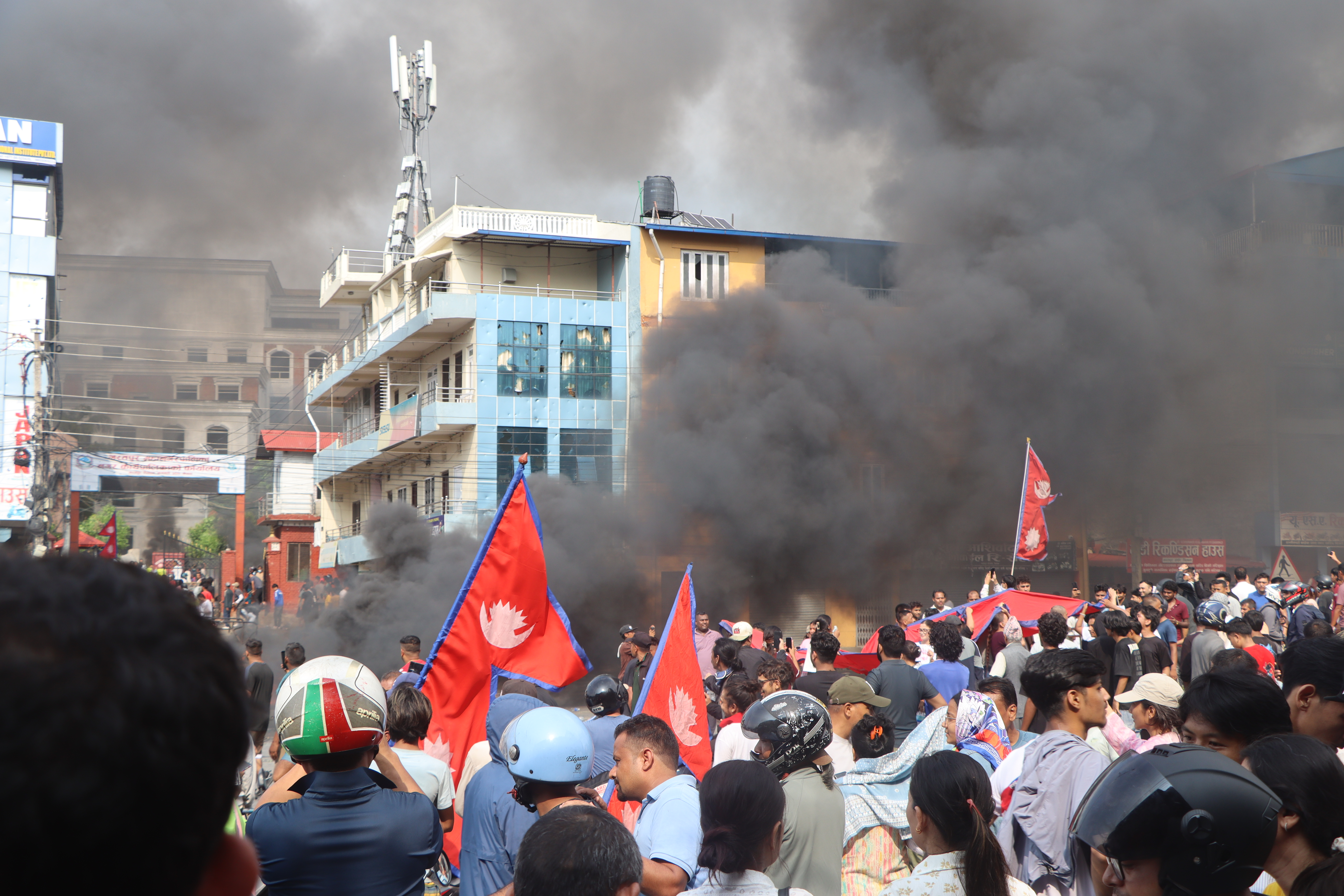
The Congress would be targeted in the 2025 Nepalese Gen Z protests due to their support of the government of K. P. Sharma Oli.

Oli's government would be short lived as on 4 September 2025 it issued a mandate to shut down most social media in Nepal such as Facebook, X, YouTube, LinkedIn, Reddit, Signal, and Snapchat, for failing to register under the Ministry of Communication and Information Technology. The government claimed that this was to increase tax revenues on foreign social media companies, however, detractors pointed out the ban came amidst the growing backlash to the "Nepo-Kid" trend, where children of major political parties politicians flaunted their extravagant wealth and lifestyle, mostly gained due to their parents corruption, while the average Nepali struggled economically. Protests against the ban saw a heavy crack-down by the Oli government, with the Nepalese Armed Forces using live ammunition to disperse protesters as they reached the Nepali parliament building, resulting in the death of 19 protesters. This violent crackdown only further emboldened the protesters, resulting in massive protests across the capital, which the government also cracked down on, and by the end of 8 September, 51 people had been killed by the government and more than 347 where injured.

On 9 September, Oli would resign as prime minister and flee to a military barracks for protection as the protests only continued to escalate into a full scale revolution. Protesters vandalized the CPN (UML) headquarters, and burn down the house of former prime ministers and major portfolios of the party. The protests finally end during the night of 11 September going into the early morning of 12 September, as the protesters, president and army reached an agreement where former Supreme Court chief justice Sushila Karki was named interim prime minister until fresh elections could be held on March 5, 2026.

== Ideology ==
The guiding principle of the party is Marxism–Leninism and it supports a socialist economy but within the confines of a parliamentary system of governance. The party had adopted the line of People's Multiparty Democracy which was proposed by Madan Bhandari at the party's 5th National Convention in 1993. Under the proposal the party adopted some liberal democratic ideals of periodic elections with competition among political parties, rule of the majority party and the rule of law. The party supports the establishment of a welfare system that guarantees social security and social justice to all citizens.

People's Multiparty Democracy (जनताको बहुदलीय जनवाद)

The party had rejected calls for a Left Alliance during the civil war with the CPN (Maoist) to establish a republican system and hold elections for a constituent assembly. They instead committed to a constitutional monarchy. But after the coup by King Gyanendra in 2005, the party advocated for a democratic republic.

=== Symbol ===
Flag of CPN (UML)

Alternative flag of CPN (UML)

The election symbol of CPN (UML) is the sun which is also present in the party logo. The hammer and sickle, a common symbol of communism, is also used in the party flag and logo. The party constitution determines that a golden hammer and sickle inside a red sun is the party's logo.

== Organisation ==
=== Central organisation ===
The National Convention is the supreme body of CPN (UML) and it is organized every five years by the party's Central Committee. The national convention elects the central secretariat and the central committee of the party. The convention also discusses and approves political documents, organisational proposals and amendments to the party constitution.

The Central Committee of the party is the highest decision-making body within general conventions and is responsible to the national convention. The National Convention elects a Central Secretariat consisting of a chair, a senior vice-chair, six vice-chairs, one general secretary, three deputy general secretaries and seven secretaries. The Central Secretariat along with other elected members make up the 301-member Central Committee of the party. The chairs of the seven provincial committees of the party are also ex-officio members of the Central Committee. One-third of the committee is also required to be female. The Central Committee also elects a 99-member Politburo and a 45-member Standing Committee among its members.

When the Central Committee is not in session the Politburo is the highest decision-making body, the Standing Committee follows the Politburo in hierarchy and the Central Secretariat follows the Standing Committee. The National Convention also elects a Central Disciplinary Commission, a Central Accounts Commission and a Central Electoral Commission. A Central Advisory Council can also be formed by the Central Committee if needed.

=== Provincial and local organisation ===
Party committees exist at the provincial, district, local, ward and neighborhood level. In addition to this the party has a separate special committee in the Kathmandu Valley which is in the same level as the provincial committees in the party. The provincial committee holds a provincial convention every four years and the rest of the committees hold a convention every three years except for neighborhood committees which hold a convention every two years. The convention elects the leadership and members of the committee which is the supreme decision-making body in between conventions. The party also has organisational committees for areas where the party does not have presence yet.

== Electoral performance ==
=== Legislative elections ===
Election	Leader	Constituency votes			Party list votes			Seats		Position	Resulting government
Election	Leader	No.	%	% change	No.	%	% change	No.	±	Position	Resulting government
1991	Man Mohan Adhikari	2,040,102	27.98					69 / 205		2nd	In opposition
1994	Man Mohan Adhikari	2,352,601	30.85	▲2.87				88 / 205	▲19	▲1st	Minority government
1999	Madhav Kumar Nepal	2,728,725	31.66	▲0.81				71 / 205	▼17	▼2nd	In opposition
2008	Madhav Kumar Nepal	2,229,064	21.63	▼10.03	2,183,370	20.33		108 / 601	▲37	▼3rd	Coalition government
2013	Jhala Nath Khanal	2,492,090	27.55	▲5.92	2,239,609	23.66	▲3.33	175 / 575	▲67	▲2nd	Coalition government
2017	K. P. Sharma Oli	3,082,277	30.68	▲3.13	3,173,494	33.25	▲9.59	121 / 275	▼54	▲1st	Coalition government
2017	K. P. Sharma Oli	3,082,277	30.68	▲3.13	3,173,494	33.25	▲9.59	121 / 275	▼54	▲1st	In opposition
2022	K. P. Sharma Oli	3,233,567	30.83	▲0.15	2,845,641	26.95	▼6.30	78 / 275	▼43	▼2nd	Coalition government
2022	K. P. Sharma Oli	3,233,567	30.83	▲0.15	2,845,641	26.95	▼6.30	78 / 275	▼43	▼2nd	In opposition
2022	K. P. Sharma Oli	3,233,567	30.83	▲0.15	2,845,641	26.95	▼6.30	78 / 275	▼43	▼2nd	Coalition government
2026	K. P. Sharma Oli	1,623,159	15.42	▼15.41	1,455,885	13.44	▼13.51	25 / 275	▼53	▼3rd	In opposition

=== Provincial Assembly ===
Provincial Assembly	Election	Party list votes	%	Seats	+/–	Status
Koshi	2022	665,460	35.04 (#1)	40 / 93	▼11	Leading coalition
Madhesh	2022	351,768	16.86 (#2)	23 / 107	▲2	In coalition
Bagmati	2022	594,521	30.69 (#1)	27 / 110	▼31	In coalition
Gandaki	2022	349,628	35.47 (#1)	22 / 60	▼5	In coalition
Lumbini	2022	570,921	30.25 (#1)	29 / 87	▼12	Leading coalition
Karnali	2022	183,950	31.83 (#1)	10 / 53	▼15	Leading coalition
Sudurpashchim	2022	274,675	30.64 (#1)	10 / 53	▼15	In coalition

Best historic result in provincial elections
Provincial Assembly	Seats/Total	Party list vote %	Election	Parliamentary Party leader
Koshi	51 / 93	38.79 (#1)	2017	Sher Dhan Rai; Bhim Acharya
Madhesh	23 / 107	16.86 (#2)	2022	Saroj Kumar Yadav
Bagmati	58 / 110	35.81 (#1)	2017	Dormani Poudel; Astalaxmi Shakya
Gandaki	27 / 60	39.04 (#1)	2017	Prithvi Subba Gurung
Lumbini	41 / 87	33.10 (#1)	2017	Shankar Pokharel
Karnali	20 / 40	34.35 (#1)	2017	Yam Lal Kandel
Sudurpashchim	25 / 53	32.99 (#2)	2017	Prakash Bahadur Shah

=== Local election ===
Election	Leader(s)	Council Head		Council Deputy		Councillors		Position
Election	Leader(s)	#	±	#	±	#	±	Position
2017	K. P. Sharma Oli	294 / 753		331 / 753		14,097 / 35,038		1st
2022	K. P. Sharma Oli	206 / 753	▼90	240 / 753	▼108	11,890 / 35,011	▼2,207	▼2nd

== Leadership ==
=== Chairmen ===
- Man Mohan Adhikari, 1991–1999
- Jhala Nath Khanal, 2009–2014
- K. P. Sharma Oli, 2014–2018, 2021–present

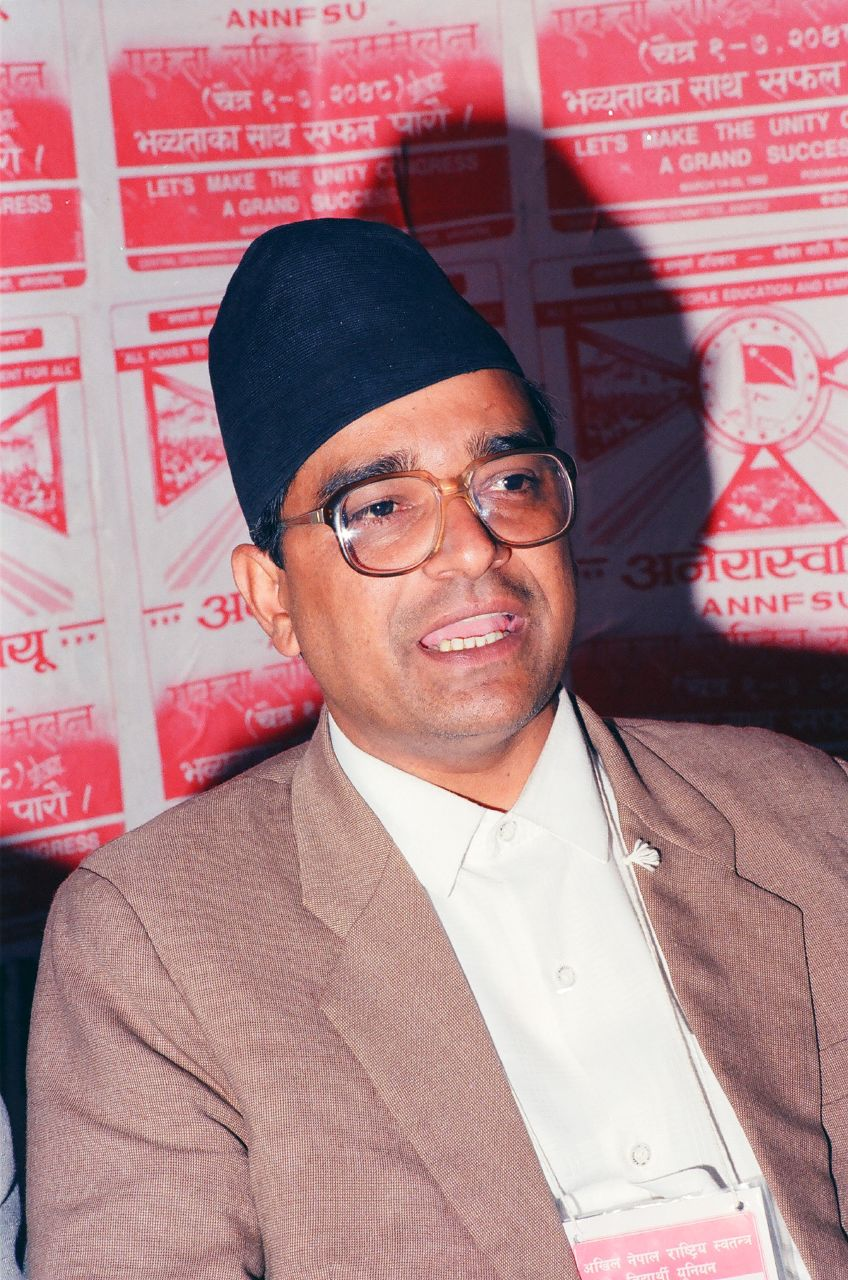
1st General Secretary of CPN (UML), Madan Bhandari

=== General secretaries ===
- Madan Bhandari, 1991–1993
- Madhav Kumar Nepal, 1993–2008
- Jhala Nath Khanal, 2008–2009
- Ishwar Pokhrel, 2009–2018, in 2021
- Shankar Pokhrel, 2021–present

=== Prime Ministers of Nepal ===
No.	Prime Minister	Portrait	Term in office			Legislature	Cabinet	Constituency
No.	Prime Minister	Portrait	Start	End	Tenure	Legislature	Cabinet	Constituency
1	Man Mohan Adhikari		30 November 1994	12 September 1995	286 days	3rd House of Representatives	Adhikari, 1994	Kathmandu 3
2	Madhav Kumar Nepal		25 May 2009	6 February 2011	1 year, 257 days	1st Constituent Assembly	Madhav Nepal, 2009	Nominated
3	Jhala Nath Khanal		6 February 2011	29 August 2011	204 days	1st Constituent Assembly	Khanal, 2011	Ilam 1
4	K. P. Sharma Oli		12 October 2015	4 August 2016	297 days	Legislature Parliament	Oli, 2015	Jhapa 7
4	K. P. Sharma Oli		15 February 2018	13 May 2021	3 years, 148 days	1st Federal Parliament	Oli, 2018	Jhapa 5
4	K. P. Sharma Oli		13 May 2021	13 July 2021	3 years, 148 days	1st Federal Parliament	Oli, 2021	Jhapa 5
4	K. P. Sharma Oli		15 July 2024	13 September 2025	2 years, 109 days	2nd Federal Parliament	Oli, 2024	Jhapa 5

=== Chief Ministers ===
==== Koshi Province ====
No.	Chief Minister	Portrait	Term in office			Legislature	Cabinet	Constituency
No.	Chief Minister	Portrait	Start	End	Tenure	Legislature	Cabinet	Constituency
1	Sher Dhan Rai		14 February 2018	26 August 2021	3 years, 193 days	1st Provincial Assembly	Rai, 2018	Bhojpur 1(B)
2	Bhim Acharya		26 August 2021	1 November 2021	67 days	1st Provincial Assembly	Acharya, 2021	Sunsari 1(B)
3	Hikmat Kumar Karki		9 January 2023	7 July 2023	179 days	2nd Provincial Assembly	Karki I, 2023	Jhapa 5 (A)
3	Hikmat Kumar Karki		8 September 2023	15 October 2023	37 days	2nd Provincial Assembly	Karki II, 2023	Jhapa 5 (A)
3	Hikmat Kumar Karki		9 May 2024	Incumbent	2 years, 176 days	2nd Provincial Assembly	Karki II, 2024	Jhapa 5 (A)

==== Bagmati Province ====
No.	Chief Minister	Portrait	Term in office			Legislature	Cabinet	Constituency
No.	Chief Minister	Portrait	Start	End	Tenure	Legislature	Cabinet	Constituency
1	Dormani Poudel		11 February 2018	18 August 2021	3 years, 188 days	1st Provincial Assembly	Poudel, 2018	Makwanpur 1(B)
2	Astalaxmi Shakya		18 August 2021	27 October 2021	70 days	1st Provincial Assembly	Shakya, 2021	Kathmandu 8(B)

==== Gandaki Province ====
No.	Chief Minister	Portrait	Term in office			Legislature	Cabinet	Constituency
No.	Chief Minister	Portrait	Start	End	Tenure	Legislature	Cabinet	Constituency
1	Prithivi Subba Gurung		16 February 2018	9 May 2021	3 years, 82 days	1st Provincial Assembly	Gurung, 2018	Lamjung 1(B)
1	Prithivi Subba Gurung		12 May 2021	12 June 2021	31 days	1st Provincial Assembly	Gurung, 2018	Lamjung 1(B)
2	Khagaraj Adhikari		9 January 2023	27 April 2023	108 days	2nd Provincial Assembly	Adhikari, 2023	Kaski 1 (A)
2	Khagaraj Adhikari		7 April 2024	27 May 2024	50 days	2nd Provincial Assembly	Adhikari, 2024	Kaski 1 (A)

==== Lumbini Province ====
No.	Chief Minister	Portrait	Term in office			Legislature	Cabinet	Constituency
No.	Chief Minister	Portrait	Start	End	Tenure	Legislature	Cabinet	Constituency
1	Shankar Pokharel		15 February 2018	2 May 2021	3 years, 76 days	1st Provincial Assembly	Pokharel, 2018	Dang 2(A)
1	Shankar Pokharel		2 May 2021	11 August 2021	101 days	1st Provincial Assembly	Pokharel, 2018	Dang 2(A)
2	Leela Giri		12 January 2023	27 April 2023	105 days	2nd Provincial Assembly	Giri, 2023	Rupandehi 2(A)
3	Chet Narayan Acharya		24 July 2024	Incumbent	2 years, 100 days	2nd Provincial Assembly	Acharya, 2024	Arghakhanchi 1(A)

==== Karnali Province ====
No.	Chief Minister	Portrait	Term in office			Legislature	Cabinet	Constituency
No.	Chief Minister	Portrait	Start	End	Tenure	Legislature	Cabinet	Constituency
1	Yam Lal Kandel		10 April 2024	Incumbent	2 years, 205 days	2nd Provincial Assembly	Kandel, 2024	Surkhet 2 (A)

==== Sudurpashchim Province ====
No.	Chief Minister	Portrait	Term in office			Legislature	Cabinet	Constituency
No.	Chief Minister	Portrait	Start	End	Tenure	Legislature	Cabinet	Constituency
1	Rajendra Singh Rawal		12 January 2023	9 February 2023	28 days	2nd Provincial Assembly	Rawal, 2023	List MP

== Sister organizations ==
- General Federation of Nepalese Trade Unions
- National Youth Association, Nepal
- All Nepal National Free Students Union
- All Nepal Women's Association
- All Nepal Peasants Association
- All India Nepalese Free Students Union
- Nepal National Teachers Association
- National People's Cultural Forum
- Democratic National Organization of Persons with Disabilities–Nepal

== See also ==
- 11th general convention of Communist Party of Nepal (Unified Marxist–Leninist)
- Nepali Communist Party
- Communist Party of Nepal (Marxist–Leninist)
