= Shailendra Prasad Sah =

Nepalese politician

- शैलेन्द्र प्रसाद साह

Minister for Economic Affairs and Planning of Madhesh Province
- In office 1 March 2018 – 2022
- Governor: Ratneshwar Lal Kayastha; Tilak Pariyar; Rajesh Jha; Hari Shankar Mishra
- Chief minister: Lalbabu Raut
- Preceded by: Constitution created

Minister for Land Management, Agriculture and Co-operatives of Madhesh Province
- In office 1 March 2018 – 15 February 2018
- Governor: Ratneshwar Lal Kayastha
- Chief minister: Lalbabu Raut
- Preceded by: Constitution created
- Succeeded by: Bijay Kumar Yadav

Province Assembly Member of Madhesh Province
- In office 2017–2022
- Preceded by: N/A
- Constituency: Saptari 2 (A)

Personal details
- Born: October 27, 1976 (age 49)
- Citizenship: Nepali
- Party: People's Socialist Party, Nepal
- Occupation: Politician

Shailendra Prasad Sah (Nepali: शैलेन्द्र प्रसाद साह) is a Nepalese politician. He is a former member of Provincial Assembly of Madhesh Province from People's Socialist Party, Nepal. Sah, a resident of Bishnupur Rural Municipality, Saptari, was elected via 2017 Nepalese provincial elections from Saptari 2(A).

== Electoral history ==
=== 2017 Nepalese provincial elections ===
Party	Candidate	Votes
Federal Socialist Forum, Nepal	Shailendra Prasad Sah	10,577
CPN (Maoist Centre)	Saroj Kumar Mandal	7,593
Nepali Congress	Ranjit Karna	3,768
Naya Shakti Party Nepal	Dharma Narayan Raya Amat	1,475
Others		2,062
Invalid votes		2,560
Result	FSFN gain	
Source: Election Commission
