= Governor (Nepal) =

Nominal head of a Nepalese province appointed by the President of Nepal

Governor of Provinces of Nepal
- प्रदेश प्रमुख
- Flag of Nepal
- Style: The Honourable
- Residence: Various
- Appointer: President of Nepal
- Term length: 5 years
- Formation: 2019
- Salary: 76,240 Nepalese rupees (NPR)

In the Federal Democratic Republic of Nepal, a governor is the constitutional head of each of the seven provinces. Sub-Article 1 of Article 163 of the Constitution of Nepal says that the Governor is a representative of the Government of Nepal in each province. The governor is appointed by the president of Nepal recommended by federal cabinet for a term of five years and holds office at the president's pleasure. A person who has once served as the governor of a province cannot be appointed to the same post twice. The governor is de jure head of the provincial government; all its executive actions are taken in the governor's name. However, the governor must act on the advice of the popularly elected council of ministers, headed by the chief minister, which thus holds de facto executive authority at the province-level. The Constitution of Nepal also empowers the governor to act upon his or her own discretion, such as the ability to appoint or dismiss a ministry, recommend president's rule for the president's assent.

== Incumbent Governors of Nepal ==
| Province (past governors) | Name | Portrait | Assumed office | Website | Ref. |
|---|---|---|---|---|---|
| Koshi (list) | Parshuram Khapung | | 11 November 2021 (4 years, 300 days) | Official website | |
| Madhesh (list) | Surendra Labh Karna | | 11 November 2025 (300 days) | Official website | |
| Bagmati (list) | Deepak Prakash Devkota | | 1 August 2024 (2 years, 37 days) | Official website | |
| Gandaki (list) | Dilli Raj Bhatta | | 15 March 2024 (2 years, 176 days) | Official website | |
| Lumbini (list) | Krishna Bahadur Gharti Magar | | 1 August 2024 (2 years, 37 days) | Official website | |
| Karnali (list) | Yagya Raj Joshi | | 1 August 2024 (2 years, 37 days) | Official website | |
| Sudurpashchim (list) | Najir Miya | | 15 March 2024 (2 years, 176 days) | Official website | |

== Selection process ==
Article 164 of the Constitution of Nepal states that:

1. being qualified for being a member of the Federal Parliament,
2. having completed the age of thirty five years, and
3. not being disqualified by any law.

== List of governors by province ==
=== Koshi Province ===
| No. | Name | Took office | Left office | Tenure |
|---|---|---|---|---|
| 1 | Govinda Subba | 19 January 2018 | 3 November 2019 | 288 days |
| 2 | Somnath Adhikari | 5 November 2019 | 9 November 2021 | 2 years, 4 days |
| 3 | Parshuram Khapung | 11 November 2021 | Incumbent | 4 years, 300 days |

=== Madhesh Province ===
| No. | Name | Took office | Left office | Tenure |
|---|---|---|---|---|
| 1 | Ratneshwar Lal Kayastha | 19 January 2019 | 3 November 2019 | 288 days |
| 2 | Tilak Pariyar | 5 November 2019 | 19 February 2021 | 1 year, 106 days |
| 3 | Rajesh Jha | 19 February 2021 | 17 August 2021 | 179 days |
| 4 | Hari Shankar Mishra | 17 August 2021 | 15 March 2024 | 2 years, 211 days |
| 5 | Sumitra Bhandari | 15 March 2024 | 11 November 2025 | 1 year, 241 days |
| 6 | Surendra Labh Karna | 11 November 2025 | Incumbent | 300 days |

=== Bagmati Province ===
| No. | Name | Took office | Left office | Tenure |
|---|---|---|---|---|
| 1 | Anuradha Koirala | 19 January 2019 | 3 November 2019 | 288 days |
| 2 | Bishnu Prasad Prasain | 5 November 2019 | 20 August 2021 | 1 year, 288 days |
| 3 | Yadav Chandra Sharma | 20 August 2021 | Incumbent | 5 years, 18 days |

=== Gandaki Province ===
| No. | Name | Took office | Left office | Tenure |
|---|---|---|---|---|
| 1 | Baburam Kunwar | 19 January 2019 | 3 November 2019 | 288 days |
| 2 | Amik Sherchan | 5 November 2019 | 3 May 2021 | 1 year, 179 days |
| 3 | Sita Kumari Poudel | 3 May 2021 | 27 July 2021 | 85 days |
| 4 | Prithvi Man Gurung | 27 July 2021 | Incumbent | 5 years, 42 days |

=== Lumbini Province ===
| No. | Name | Took office | Left office | Tenure |
|---|---|---|---|---|
| 1 | Uma Kant Jha | 19 January 2019 | 3 November 2019 | 288 days |
| 2 | Dharmanath Yadav | 5 November 2019 | 27 July 2021 | 1 year, 264 days |
| 3 | Amik Sherchan | 27 July 2021 | Incumbent | 5 years, 42 days |

=== Karnali Province ===
| No. | Name | Took office | Left office | Tenure |
|---|---|---|---|---|
| 1 | Durga Keshar Khanal | 19 January 2019 | 3 November 2019 | 288 days |
| 2 | Govinda Prasad Kalauni | 5 November 2019 | 9 November 2021 | 2 years, 4 days |
| 3 | Tilak Pariyar | 11 November 2021 | Incumbent | 4 years, 300 days |

=== Sudurpashchim Province ===
| No. | Name | Took office | Left office | Tenure |
|---|---|---|---|---|
| 1 | Mohan Raj Malla | 19 January 2019 | 3 November 2019 | 288 days |
| 2 | Sharmila Kumari Panta | 4 November 2019 | 3 May 2021 | 1 year, 180 days |
| 3 | Ganga Prasad Yadav | 3 May 2021 | 9 November 2021 | 190 days |
| 4 | Dev Raj Joshi | 11 November 2021 | Incumbent | 4 years, 300 days |

== See also ==
- President of Nepal
- Provinces of Nepal
