= Mekha Lal Shrestha =

Nepali politician

Honourable Mekha Lal Shrestha
- मेख लाल श्रेष्ठ

Minister for Education, Culture, Science Technology and Social Development of Gandaki Province
- In office 23 July 2021 – 10 January 2023
- Governor: Sita Kumari Poudel; Prithvi Man Gurung
- Chief minister: Krishna Chandra Nepali Pokharel
- Preceded by: Kumar Khadka

Member of the Gandaki Provincial Assembly
- In office 2018–2022

Personal details
- Party: Nepali Congress
- Website: gandaki.gov.np

Mekha Lal Shrestha (Nepali: मेख लाल श्रेष्ठ) is a Nepali politician of Nepali Congress and Minister in Gandaki government since 23 July 2021. He is also serving as member of the Gandaki Province Provincial Assembly. Shrestha was elected to the 2017 provincial assembly elections from the proportional list. He joined Krishna Chandra Nepali cabinet as Minister for Education, Culture, Science, Technology and Social Development on 23 July 2021.
