= Dobate Bishwakarma =

Nepali politician

Honourable Dobate Bishwakarma
- दोबाटे विश्वकर्मा

Minister for Internal Affairs of Gandaki Province
- Incumbent
- Assumed office 11 October 2021
- Governor: Sita Kumari Poudel; Prithvi Man Gurung
- Chief Minister: Krishna Chandra Nepali Pokharel
- Preceded by: Hari Bahadur Chuman

Province Assembly Member of Gandaki Province
- Incumbent
- Assumed office 2017
- Preceded by: Assembly Created
- Constituency: Proportional list

Personal details
- Party: Nepali Congress
- Website: gandaki.gov.np

Dobate Bishwakarma (Nepali: दोबाटे विश्वकर्मा) is a Nepali politician of Nepali Congress and Minister in Gandaki government since 11 October 2021. He is also serving as member of the Gandaki Province Provincial Assembly.

Bishwakarma was elected to the 2017 provincial assembly elections from the proportional list for Dalit representation. He joined Krishna Chandra Nepali cabinet as Minister for Internal Affairs on 11 October 2021.
