= Province Public Service Commission (Madhesh Province) =

Province government agency

Province Public Service Commission (Madhesh Province) प्रदेश लोक सेवा आयोग (मधेश प्रदेश)
- PPSC MP

Constitutional body overview
- Formed: 21 September 2019; 6 years ago
- Jurisdiction: Madhesh Province
- Headquarters: Janakpur, Madhesh
- Constitutional body executives: Dr. Shivram Yadav, Chairman; Dr. Sujata Dev, Member; Sunil Kumar Mishra, Member
- Parent department: Government of Madhesh Province
- Website: ppsc.p2.gov.np

The Province Public Service Commission (Madhesh Province) (PPSC MP) is a government agency of Madhesh Province constituted to recruit candidates for various government jobs under the Government of Madhesh Province through competitive examinations. It is headquartered in Janakpur, Dhanusha, Madhesh, and functions through its own secretariat. The commission was established on 21 September 2019. Dr. Shivaram Yadav is the present chairman of the commission.

== History ==
The Province Public Service Commission (Madhesh Province) was commissioned under Article 244, Clause (1) of Part 23 of the Constitution of Nepal. According to the provision in the constitution, the National Assembly passed the Province Public Service Commission Bill on 24 February 2019.

On 21 September 2019, the Province governor Ratneshwar Lal Kayastha, certified the Provincial Public Service Commission Act, 2019, which was passed by the Madhesh Provincial Assembly. The Commission initially began its functioning for the Madhesh province with its headquarters at Janakpur. The first chairman of the Province Public Service Commission, Madhesh Province, was Dr. Surendra Prasad Yadav.

The core purpose of PPSC MP has been to handle recruitment for government positions within the province. This involves conducting written exams and interviews to select qualified candidates for government jobs and other positions under its jurisdiction.

== Functions and responsibilities ==
The commission is permitted to function in accordance with the Constitution of Nepal and the Province Public Service Commission Act.

- Making recruitments to provincial organizations, local units, and departmental posts.
- Conducting competitive examinations in the province.
- Conducting interviews, preliminary tests, and a written test.
- Transferring the civil servants from one service to another.
- Heading disciplinary cases under its jurisdiction.

== Commission profile ==
The Commission operates under the oversight of the provincial governor and is led by the Chairman of the Commission along with its members, each fulfilling their designated responsibilities.

== See also ==
- Public Service Commission (Nepal)
