= Krishna Chandra Nepali Pokharel cabinet =

- 3rd Cabinet of Gandaki Province
- 2021–2023
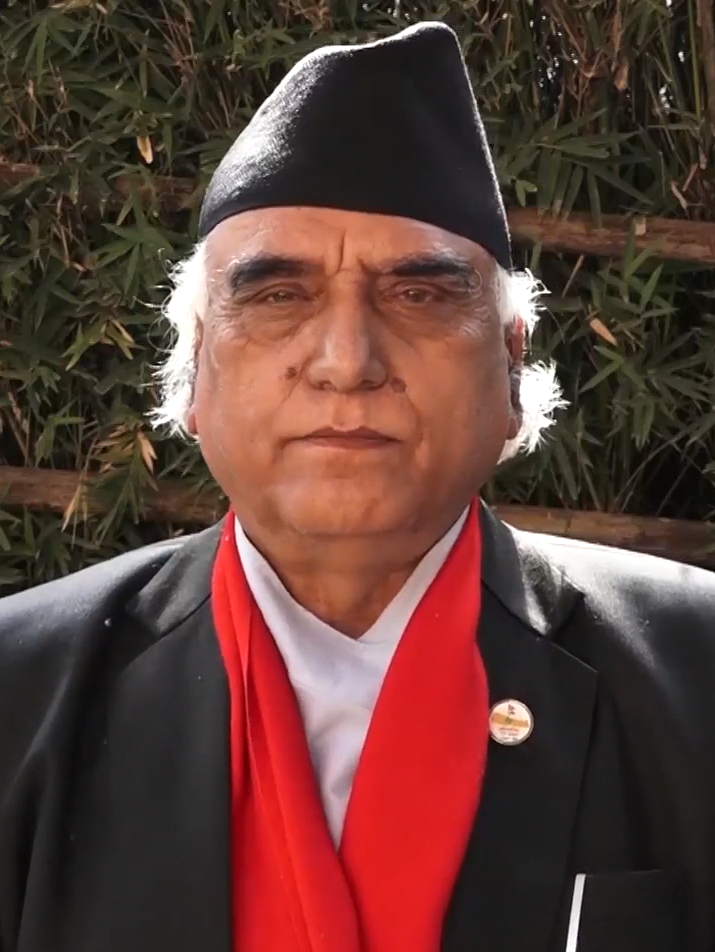
- Hon'ble Chief Minister Krishna Chandra Nepali Pokharel
- Date formed: 12 June 2021
- Date dissolved: 10 January 2023

People and organisations
- Governor: Sita Kumari Poudel; Prithvi Man Gurung
- Chief Minister: Krishna Chandra Nepali Pokharel
- Ministers removed: 2
- Total no. of members: 12 (incl. Chief Minister)
- Member parties: Nepali Congress CPN (Maoist Centre); Nepal Socialist Party; Independent External support Rastriya Janamorcha
- Status in legislature: Provincial Assembly 32 / 60 (53%)
- Opposition party: CPN (UML)
- Opposition leader: Prithvi Subba Gurung

History
- Election: 2017
- Legislature term: 5 years
- Predecessor: Second Prithvi Subba Gurung
- Successor: First Khagaraj Adhikari cabinet

Krishna Chandra Nepali was sworn in as Chief Minister of Gandaki Province on 12 June 2021. This government was supported by CPN(Maoist-Centre), NSP while Rastriya Janamorcha supported without joining the government.

== Cabinet Ministers ==
S.N.	Portfolio	Name Constituency	Political Party	Took office	Left office
Cabinet ministers
1	Chief Minister	Krishna Chandra Nepali Pokahrel; MPA for Nawalparasi East 1(A)	Nepali Congress	12 June 2021	9 January 2023
2	Minister for Physical Infrastructure, Urban Development and Transport Management	Kumar Khadka; List MPA	Nepali Congress	23 July 2021	15 November 2022
3	Minister for Finance	Ramji Prasad Baral; MPA for Kaski 3(A)	CPN (Maoist Centre)	23 July 2021	9 January 2023
4	Minister for Energy, Water Resources and Water Supply	Hari Sharan Acharya; MPA for Gorkha 2(A)	NSP	12 June 2021	8 November 2022
5	Minister for Youth and Sports	Rajiv Gurung; MPA for Manang 1(A)	Independent	12 June 2021	9 January 2023
6	Minister for Tourism, Industry, Commerce and Supplies	Mani Bhadra Sharma; List MPA	Nepali Congress	23 July 2021	9 January 2023
7	Minister for Education, Culture, Science Technology and Social Development	Mekha Lal Shrestha; List MPA	Nepali Congress	23 July 2021	9 January 2023
8	Minister for Health and Population	Madhumaya Adhikari Gurung; List MPA	CPN (Maoist Centre)	12 June 2021	9 January 2023
9	Minister for Land Management, Agriculture, Cooperatives and Poverty Alleviation	Chandra Bahadur Budha; MPA for Baglung 2(A)	CPN (Maoist Centre)	23 July 2021	9 January 2023
10	Minister for Law, Communications and Provincial Assembly Affairs	Bindu Kumar ThapaMPA for Kaski 2(B)	Nepali Congress	23 July 2021	9 January 2023
11	Minister for Forests, Environment and Soil Conservation	Dipak Thapa; MPA for Syangja 1(A)	CPN (Maoist Centre)	23 July 2021	9 January 2023
12	Minister for Internal affairs	Dobate Bishwakarma	Nepali Congress	11 October 2021	9 January 2023

=== Until June – July 2021 ===
S.N.	Portfolio	Name Constituency	Political Party	Took office	Left office
Cabinet ministers
1	Chief Minister	Krishna Chandra Nepali Pokahrel; MPA for Nawalparasi East 1(A)	Nepali Congress	12 June 2021	9 January 2023
2	Minister for Education, Culture, Science Technology and Social Development	Kumar Khadka; List MPA	Nepali Congress	12 June 2021	23 July 2021
3	Minister for Youth and Sports	Rajiv Gurung; MPA for Manang 1(A)	Independent	12 June 2021	9 January 2023
4	Minister for Health and Population	Madhumaya Adhikari Gurung; List MPA	CPN (Maoist Centre)	12 June 2021	9 January 2023
5	Minister for Energy, Water Resources and Water Supply	Hari Sharan Acharya; MPA for Gorkha 2(A)	NSP	12 June 2021	8 November 2022

== Member by party ==
Representation of cabinet ministers by party
1. Nepali Congress (50.0%)
2. CPN (Maoist Centre) (34.0%)
3. Socialist Party of Nepal (8.00%)
4. Independent (8.00%)

Party	Cabinet Ministers	Ministers of State	Total Ministers
Nepali Congress	6	0	6
Nepal Socialist Party	1	0	1
CPN (Maoist Centre)	4	0	4
Independent	1	0	1

== See also ==
- Rajendra Kumar Rai cabinet
- Lalbabu Raut cabinet
- Rajendra Prasad Pandey cabinet
- Kul Prasad KC cabinet
- Jeevan Bahadur Shahi cabinet
- Trilochan Bhatta cabinet
