= Mani Bhadra Sharma =

Nepali politician

Honourable Mani Bhadra Sharma Kandel
- मणि भद्र शर्मा कँडेल

Minister for Tourism, Industry, Commerce and Supplies of Gandaki Province
- Incumbent
- Assumed office 23 July 2021
- Governor: Sita Kumari Poudel; Prithvi Man Gurung
- Chief minister: Krishna Chandra Nepali Pokharel
- Preceded by: Bikash Lamsal

Province Assembly Member of Gandaki Province
- Incumbent
- Assumed office 2017
- Preceded by: Assembly Created
- Constituency: Proportional list

Personal details
- Born: February 17, 1954 (age 72) Kathekhola-8, Lekhani, Baglung
- Party: Nepali Congress
- Website: gandaki.gov.np

Mani Bhadra Sharma Kandel (Nepali: मणि भद्र शर्मा) is a Nepali politician of Nepali Congress and Minister in Gandaki government since 23 July 2021. He is also serving as member of the Gandaki Province Provincial Assembly. Sharma was elected to the 2017 provincial assembly elections from the proportional list. He joined Krishna Chandra Nepali cabinet as Minister for Tourism, Industry, Commerce and Supplies on 23 July 2021.
