= Bindu Kumar Thapa =

Nepali politician

Honourable Bindu Kumar Thapa
- बिन्दु कुमार थापा

Minister for Social Development, Youth and Sports of Gandaki Province
- Incumbent
- Assumed office 2 September 2024
- Governor: Dilli Raj Bhatta
- Chief minister: Surendra Raj Pandey
- Preceded by: Himself (Note: As Minister for Social Development and Health)

Minister for Social Development and Health of Gandaki Province
- In office 29 May 2024 – 2 September 2024
- Governor: Dilli Raj Bhatta
- Chief minister: Surendra Raj Pandey
- Preceded by: Sita Kumari Sundas
- Succeeded by: Himself (Note: As Minister for Social Development, Youth and Sports); Krishna Prasad Pathak (Note: As Minister for Health)

Minister for Energy, Water Resources and Water Supply of Gandaki Province
- In office 29 May 2024 – 11 June 2024
- Governor: Dilli Raj Bhatta
- Chief minister: Surendra Raj Pandey
- Preceded by: Ved Bahadur Gurung
- Succeeded by: Phandindra Devkota

Minister for Law, Communication and Provincial Assembly Affairs of Gandaki Province
- In office 23 July 2021 – 9 January 2023
- Governor: Sita Kumari Poudel; Prithvi Man Gurung
- Chief Minister: Krishna Chandra Nepali Pokharel
- Preceded by: Ministry established
- Succeeded by: Ministry abolished

Member of the Gandaki Provincial Assembly
- Incumbent
- Assumed office 21 January 2018
- Preceded by: Constituency established
- Constituency: Kaski 2(B)

Personal details
- Born: 25/10/1959 Pokhara, Nepal
- Party: Nepali Congress
- Website: bindukthapa.com

Bindu Kumar Thapa (Nepali: बिंदु कुमार थापा) is a Nepali politician. He is a member of Nepali Congress.

On September 9, 2025, his house was burnt by the GenZ protesters because of an image of his son Saugat Thapa beside a christmas tree of luxury items that went viral during the anti-corruption protest on and before September 8, 2025.

== Career ==
Thapa served as a Member of Parliament of Gandaki Province Assembly in the provincial election of 2017. He was reelected in the provincial election of 2022.

He was elected as a member of Gandaki Province Assembly for the second time in the local election held on 2022 Gandaki Province Provincial Assembly.

Thapa was elected to the 2017 provincial assembly elections from Kaski 2(A). Thapa was the only elected member of provincial assembly from Kaski District representing Nepali Congress.

He joined Krishna Chandra Nepali cabinet as Minister for Law, Communication and Provincial Assembly Affairs on July 23 2021, remaining until 12/2022.

He was re-elected as a Member of Parliament in the 2022 elections from Gandaki Province winning twice in a row and creating history in the Nepali Congress, Kaski. He is also the Vice Parliamentary leader of the Nepali Congress, Gandaki Province. He served as a Minister for Social Development & Health of Gandaki Province, Nepal from 29 May 2024 to 1st September. Currently, he is serving as a Minister for Social Development, Youth & Sports of Gandaki Province, Nepal since 1st September 2024.
