= Kumar Khadka =

Nepali politician

Honourable Kumar Khadka
- कुमार खड्का

Minister for Physical Infrastructure, Urban Development and Transportation Management of Gandaki Province
- In office 5 June 2021 – 15 November 2021
- Governor: Sita Kumari Poudel; Prithvi Man Gurung
- Chief minister: Krishna Chandra Nepali Pokharel
- Preceded by: Ram Sharma Basnet

Minister of Women, Children and Social Welfare Development
- In office 19 January 2017 – 31 May 2017
- President: Bidya Devi Bhandari
- Prime Minister: Puspa Kamal Dahal
- Preceded by: Chandra Prakash Mainali
- Succeeded by: Asha Koirala

Member of Constituent Assembly
- In office 2013–2017
- Preceded by: Assembly Created
- Constituency: Proportional list

Province Assembly Member of Gandaki Province
- Incumbent
- Assumed office 2017
- Preceded by: Assembly Created
- Constituency: Proportional list

Personal details
- Party: Nepali Congress
- Other political affiliations: Akhanda Nepal Party (till 2017)
- Website: gandaki.gov.np

Kumar Khadka (Nepali: कुमार खड्का) is a Nepali politician of Nepali Congress and Minister in Gandaki government since 12 June 2021. As of 2013, he was the chairman of the Akhanda Nepal Party which later on joined Nepali Congress ahead of the 2017 Nepalese local elections. He is also serving as member of the Gandaki Province Provincial Assembly. Khadka was elected to the 2017 provincial assembly elections from proportional list of the party. He including three other ministers joined Krishna Chandra Nepali cabinet in first lot. He joined Krishna Chandra Nepali cabinet as Minister for Physical Infrastructure Development, Urban Development and Transport Management on 12 June 2021.
