= Government of Madhesh Province =

Government of Madhesh Province मधेश प्रदेश सरकार
- Seat of Government: Janakpur
- Country: Nepal
- Website: madhesh.gov.np

Legislative branch
- Assembly: Madhesh Provincial Assembly
- Speaker: Ram Ashish Yadav (PSP-N)
- Assembly members: 107

Executive branch
- Governor: Surendra Labh Karna
- Chief Minister: Krishna Prasad Yadav (PSP-N)

Judicial branch
- High Court: Janakpur High Court

The Government of Madhesh Province is the supreme governing authority of Madhesh Province in Nepal.

The governor of the province is appointed by the President of Nepal on the recommendation of the Nepalese cabinet for a period of five years unless freed earlier by the federal government. The head of province is the governor and the chief minister holds the position of the head of the provincial executive. The role of governor is largely ceremonial as the functioning of the government is managed entirely by the chief minister. The governor appoints all ministers and the chief minister.

The province's government seats in Janakpur at the Madhesh Province Provincial Government Secretariat.

== Background ==
The Government of Province No. 2 was formed on February 4, 2018 after the 2017 Nepalese provincial elections. The present legislative structure of Province No. 2 is Unicameral and consists of 107 legislative members (64 members are elected through FPTP and 43 are elected through PR). The normal term of the provincial assembly is five years, unless dissolved earlier.

== Executive ==
- Governor : Hari Shankar Mishra
- Chief Minister : Saroj Kumar Yadav

== Legislature ==
- Speaker of Provincial Assembly of Madhesh Province: Vacant

The province is governed by a parliamentary system of representative democracy. The legislative structure of the province is unicameral. The Provincial Assembly of Madhesh Province consists of 107 members who are elected for five-year terms. The province contributes 32 seats to the lower house of the Parliament of Nepal, the House of Representatives and 8 seats to the upper house, the National Assembly.

== Judiciary ==
- Chief Justice of Janakpur High Court : Binod Sharma (Acting)
