= Saptari 2 =

Parliamentary constituency in Nepal

- Parliamentary constituency
- The map of Saptari 2 constituency in Saptari district

- The map of Saptari 2(A) and Saptari 2(B) provincial constituency in Saptari
- Province: Madhesh Province
- District: Saptari District
- Population: 164,722 (2021)
- Electorate: 105,922 (21 November 2025)
- Major settlements: Rajbiraj; Mahadeva Rural Municipality; Tilathi Koiladi Rural Municipality; Chinnamasta Rural Municipality

Current constituency
- Created: 1991
- Party: Rastriya Swatantra Party
- Member of Parliament: Ramjee Yadav
- MPA 2(A): "Vacant"
- MPA 2(B): Mahesh Prasad Yadav Janamat

Saptari 2 is one of four parliamentary constituencies of Saptari District in Nepal. This constituency came into existence on the Constituency Delimitation Commission (CDC) report submitted on 31 August 2017.In 2026, Ramjee Yadav of Rastriya Swatantra Party won the parliamentary election from this constituency.

== Incorporated areas ==
Saptari 2 incorporates Rajbiraj Municipality, Mahadeva Rural Municipality, Tilathi Koiladi Rural Municipality, and Chinnamasta Rural Municipality.

== Assembly segments ==
It encompasses the following Provincial Assembly of Madhesh Province segment

- Saptari 2(A)
- Saptari 2(B)

== Members of Parliament ==
=== Parliament/Constituent Assembly ===
Election	Member	Party
1991	Gajendra Narayan Singh	Nepal Sadbhawana Party
1999	Ram Kumar Chaudhary	Nepali Congress
2008	Jay Prakash Prasad Gupta	Madhesi Jana Adhikar Forum, Nepal
May 2011	Jay Prakash Prasad Gupta	Madhesi Jana Adhikar Forum (Republican)
2013	Ashok Kumar Mandal	UCPN (Maoist)
April 2016	Ashok Kumar Mandal	CPN (Maoist Centre)
2017	Upendra Yadav	Federal Socialist Forum, Nepal
May 2019	Upendra Yadav	Samajbadi Party, Nepal
April 2020	Upendra Yadav	People's Socialist Party, Nepal
2022	CK Raut	Janamat Party
2026	Ramjee Yadav	Rastriya Swatantra Party

=== Provincial Assembly ===
==== 2(A) ====
Election	Member	Party
2017	Shailendra Prasad Sah	Federal Socialist Forum, Nepal
May 2019	Shailendra Prasad Sah	Samajbadi Party, Nepal
April 2020	Shailendra Prasad Sah	People's Socialist Party, Nepal
2022 - 2026 January 19	Satish Kumar Singh	Janamat Party
January 19, 2026	Vacant	

==== 2(B) ====
Election	Member	Party
2017	Manish Kumar Suman	Rastriya Janata Party Nepal
April 2020	Manish Kumar Suman	People's Socialist Party, Nepal
2022	Mahesh Prasad Yadav	Janamat Party

== Election results ==
=== Election in the 2020s ===
==== 2026 general election ====
Candidate	Party	Votes	%
Ramjee Yadav	Rastriya Swatantra Party	28,404	45.24
Umesh Kumar Yadav	People's Socialist Party, Nepal	14,263	22.72
CK Raut	Janamat Party	9,880	15.74
Satish Kumar Singh	Swabhiman Party	3,557	5.67
Ram Kumar Yadav	Nepali Congress	2,498	3.98
Afroz Aalam	Rastra Nirman Dal	1,120	1.78
Mohammad Jiaul Rahman	CPN (UML)	883	1.41
Suryanath Prasad Yadav	Nepali Communist Party	426	0.68
Ajay Kumar Das	Rastriya Prajatantra Party	374	0.60
Others		1,378	2.19
Total		62,783	100.00
Valid votes		62,783	91.65
Invalid/blank votes		5,723	8.35
Total votes		68,506	100.00
Registered voters/turnout		105,922	64.68
Majority		14,141	
Rastriya Swatantra Party gain			
Source: The Himalayan Times, GorkhaPatra

==== 2022 general election ====
Candidate	Party	Votes	%
Chandra Kant Raut	Janamat Party	35,042	57.52
Upendra Yadav	People's Socialist Party, Nepal	16,979	27.87
Jay Prakash Thakur	Loktantrik Samajwadi Party, Nepal	7,347	12.06
Others		1,553	2.55
Total		60,921	100.00
Majority		18,063	
Janamat Party gain			

==== 2(A) ====
Party	Candidate	Votes
Janamat Party	Satish Kumar Singh	16,734
People's Socialist Party, Nepal	Shailendra Prasad Sah	8,292
Loktantrik Samajwadi Party, Nepal	Saroj Kumar Mandal	6,132
Others		2,031
Invalid votes		1,394
Result	Janamat Party gain	
Source:Election Commission:

===== 2(B) =====
Party	Candidate	Votes
Janamat Party	Mahesh Prasad Yadav	13,325
CPN (Maoist Center)	Umesh Kumar Yadav	7,023
People's Socialist Party, Nepal	Laxman Kumar Yadav	5,621
Others		2,097
Invalid votes		1,576
Result	Janamat Party gain	
Source:Election Commission

=== Election in the 2010s ===
==== 2017 legislative elections ====
Party	Candidate	Votes
Federal Socialist Forum, Nepal	Upendra Yadav	21,620
CPN (Maoist Centre)	Umesh Kumar Yadav	11,580
Independent	Jay Prakash Thakur	9,459
Nepali Congress	Sakal Dev Sutihar	1,840
CPN (Marxist–Leninist)	Durga Nanda Mandal	1,465
Others		1,333
Invalid votes		5,193
Result	FSFN gain	
Source: Election Commission

==== 2017 Nepalese provincial elections ====
===== 2(A) =====
Party	Candidate	Votes
Federal Socialist Forum, Nepal	Shailendra Prasad Sah	10,577
CPN (Maoist Centre)	Saroj Kumar Mandal	7,593
Nepali Congress	Ranjit Karna	3,768
Naya Shakti Party Nepal	Dharma Narayan Raya Amat	1,475
Others		2,062
Invalid votes		2,560
Result	FSFN gain	
Source: Election Commission

===== 2(B) =====
Party	Candidate	Votes
Rastriya Janata Party Nepal	Manish Kumar Suman	8,939
CPN (Maoist Centre)	Mahesh Prasad Yadav	4,986
Independent	Laxman Yadav	3,108
Nepali Congress	Mahananda Prasad Yadav	1,605
Independent	Arun Kumar Dev	1,208
Others		2,693
Invalid votes		1,799
Result	RJPN gain	
Source: Election Commission

==== 2013 Constituent Assembly election ====
Party	Candidate	Votes
UCPN (Maoist)	Ashok Kumar Mandal	6,057
Sadbhavana Party	Nawal Kishor Sah Sudi	5,624
Madhesi Jana Adhikar Forum, Nepal	Chandra Narayan Yadav	4,835
Nepali Congress	Birbal Biraji Yadav	3,146
Rastriya Madhesh Samajbadi Party	Shekhar Kumar Singh	2,386
CPN (Unified Marxist–Leninist)	Shailendra Chandra Jha	2,384
Rastriya Prajatantra Party	Sakil Ali Miya	2,022
Madhesi Jana Adhikar Forum, Nepal (Democratic)	Dipak Kumar Yadav	1,878
Others		5,634
Result	Maoist gain	
Source: NepalNews

=== Election in the 2000s ===
==== 2008 Constituent Assembly election ====
Party	Candidate	Votes
Madhesi Jana Adhikar Forum, Nepal	Jay Prakash Prasad Gupta	8,515
Terai Madhesh Loktantrik Party	Bijay Kumar Yadav	5,765
Sadbhavana Party	Madhuri Mandal	5,384
CPN (Maoist)	Ashok Kumar Mandal	4,119
Nepali Congress	Dev Narayan Mandal	3,789
CPN (Unified Marxist–Leninist)	Jag Dev Yadav	2,922
Dalit Janajati Party	Raj Kishor Khang	1,821
Rastriya Janata Dal Nepal	Dev Narayan Mukhiya	1,660
Nepal Sadbhavana Party (Anandidevi)	Bikas Kumar Tiwari	1,036
Others		3,629
Invalid votes		3,963
Result	MJFN gain	
Source: Election Commission

=== Election in the 1990s ===
==== 1999 legislative elections ====
Party	Candidate	Votes
Nepali Congress	Ram Kumar Chaudhary	12,970
Nepal Sadbhawana Party	Gajendra Narayan Singh	12,953
CPN (Marxist–Leninist)	Jitendra Narayan Dev	5,112
CPN (Unified Marxist–Leninist)	Nathuni Prasad Yadav	4,733
Rastriya Prajatantra Party	Rajendra Prasad Yadav	2,519
Rastriya Prajatantra Party (Chand)	Dharmadish Mandal	2,110
Others		1,675
Invalid Votes		1,849
Result	Congress gain	
Source: Election Commission

==== 1994 legislative elections ====
Party	Candidate	Votes
Nepal Sadbhawana Party	Gajendra Narayan Singh	10,424
Nepali Congress	Madhu Kanta Singh	9,308
CPN (Unified Marxist–Leninist)	Jitendra Narayan Dev	7,281
Rastriya Prajatantra Party	Mukti Nath Mandal	6,522
Nepal Janabadi Morcha	Laxman Prasad Singh	1,258
Others		950
Result	NSP hold	
Source: Election Commission

==== 1991 legislative elections ====
Party	Candidate	Votes
Nepal Sadbhawana Party	Gajendra Narayan Singh	9,471
Nepali Congress	Indra Dev Singh	7,169
Result	NSP gain	

== See also ==
- List of parliamentary constituencies of Nepal
