= Manish Kumar Suman =

Nepalese politician

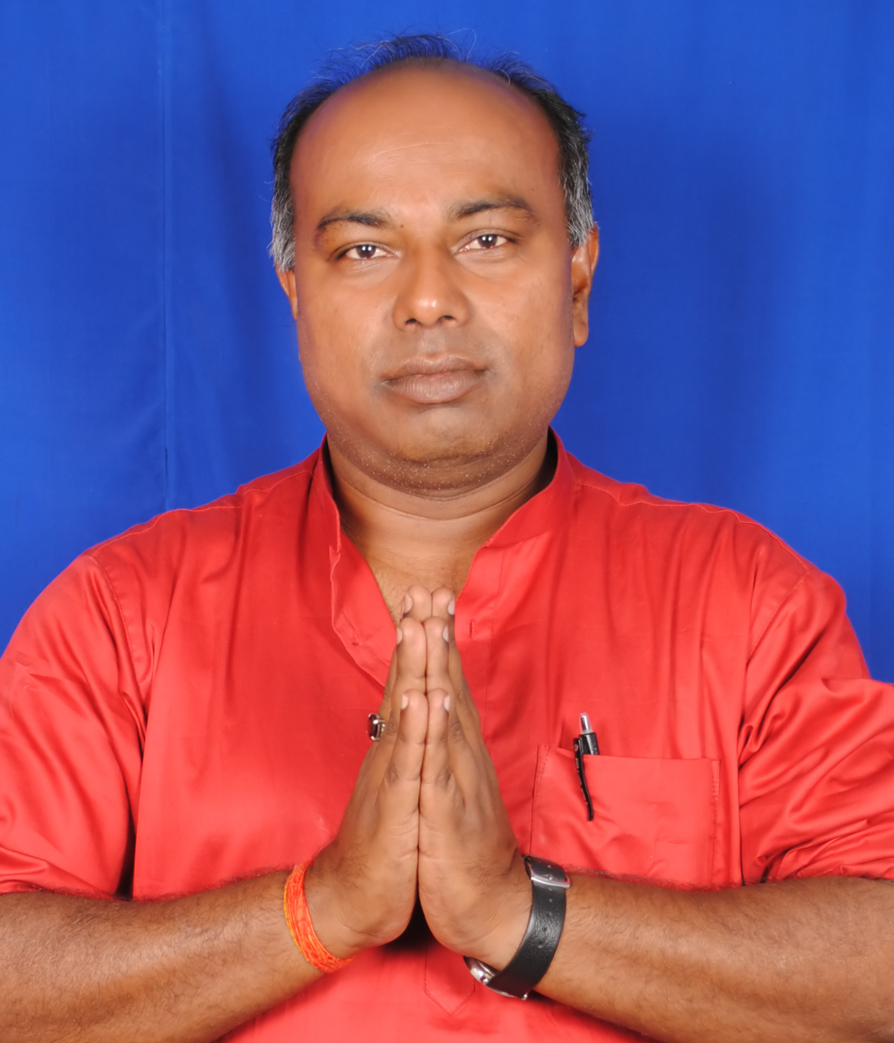
- Manish Kumar Suman during his election campaign in 2018

Ministry of Labour and Transport, Madhesh Province
- Incumbent
- Assumed office 31 December 2025

Member of the Madhesh Provincial Assembly
- In office 21 January 2018 – September 2022
- Preceded by: Position created
- Succeeded by: Mahesh Prasad Yadav
- Constituency: Saptari 2 (Kha)
- Incumbent
- Assumed office January 2023
- Constituency: Proportional representation

Chair of Finance and Planning Committee, Madhesh Province
- In office 15 February 2019 – September 2022

Personal details
- Born: 25 August 1976 (age 49) Rajbiraj, Saptari District, Madhesh Province
- Party: People's Socialist Party, Nepal (2020)
- Spouse: Kumari Achala Karna
- Children: 2
- Parent(s): Sushil Kumar Lal (father); Yasodhara Devi Das (mother)
- Occupation: Politician social worker

Manish Kumar Suman (born 25 August 1976) is a Nepalese politician and is serving as the Labour and Transport Minister of Madhesh Province from 31 December 2025. He is a member of the Madhesh Provincial Assembly and central member of People's Socialist Party, Nepal (2020). Suman left the Rastriya Janata Party and joined People's Socialist Party, Nepal in 2020.

== Early life ==
Manish Kumar Suman was born on 25 August 1976 in Kayastha family. His father is Sushil Kumar Lal and his mother is Yasodhara Devi Das. He has earned a bachelor's degree from SMBM College, Rajbiraj. He is pursuing his graduate degree in law from SMBM College, Saptari, affiliated with Tribhuvan University.

== Electoral record ==
Since 2018, Suman has fought only one election, which he won with a majority vote.

Year	Constituency	Party	Vote secured	Main opponent	Opponent vote	Result	Source
2017	Saptari 2 constituency	Rastriya Janata Party Nepal	8,939	Mahesh Prasad Yadav	4,968	Won	
