= Durga Keshar Khanal =

Nepali politician

Durga Keshar Khanal दुर्गाकेशर खनाल

1st Governor of Karnali Province
- In office 19 January 2018 – 03 November 2019
- Preceded by: Himself
- Succeeded by: Govinda Prasad Kalauni

Personal details
- Born: 12 July 1948 (age 76); Birendranagar-6, Surkhet, Karnali Province, Nepal
- Political party: Nepali Congress
- Children: 4
- Profession: Provincial Governor
- Website: oph.karnali.gov.np

Durga Keshar Khanal (Nepali: दुर्गाकेशर खनाल) is the 1st Provincial Governor of Karnali Province. He was recommended as Governor of Karnali Province on 13 January 2018.

== See also ==
- Govinda Subba
- Ratneshwar Lal Kayastha
- Anuradha Koirala
- Baburam Kunwar
- Mohan Raj Malla
