= Public Service Commission (Nepal) =

Constitutional body in Nepal

- लोक सेवा आयोग; Lok Sewa Aayog
- Logo of Public Service Commission

Agency overview
- Formed: June 15, 1951; 75 years ago
- Headquarters: Kamalpokhari, Kathmandu
- Employees: 1600
- Agency executive: Madhav Prasad Regmi, Chairman
- Parent department: Office of the Prime Minister and Council of Ministers
- Website: Official Web site

The Public Service Commission (Nepali: लोक सेवा आयोग) of Nepal was established on 15 June 1951. It is the main constitutional body involved in selecting meritorious candidates required by Government of Nepal for Civil Service vacancy. It is regarded as one of the most credible modes of recruitment by Nepalis. The Constitution of Nepal has regarded the commission as an independent constitutional body.

== Organization setup ==
The Public Service Commission is overseen by the Office of the Prime Minister and Council of Ministers.

As per Part 23 of the Constitution of Nepal (2072), the commission consists of a chairman and four members. The members are selected by the President of Nepal on the recommendation of the constitutional council.

The current chairman of the PSC is Madhav Prasad Regmi, who was nominated for the post in 2021.

== Reports ==
The commission submits its annual report to the President of Nepal. Further, the report is sent to the legislative parliament for discussion. The president places the report of the commission before the legislative parliament along with a memorandum about the cases where the advice of the commission was not accepted and the reasons for such non-acceptance.

== See also ==
- Province Public Service Commission (Madhesh Province)
