= Baburam Kunwar =

Nepali politician

Baburam Kunwar बाबुराम कुँवर

1st Provincial Governor of Gandaki Province
- In office 19 January 2018 – 03 November 2019
- Preceded by: Himself

Personal details
- Born: 25 July 1960 (age 64); Sandhikharka-1, Arghakhanchi, Lumbini Province, Nepal
- Political party: Nepali Congress
- Profession: Provincial Governor
- Website: oph.p4.gov.np

Baburam Kunwar (Nepali: बाबुराम कुँवर) is the first governor of Gandaki Province. He was recommended as Governor of Gandaki Province on 13 January 2018.

== Early life ==
Baburam Kunwar was born in Sandhikharka Municipality, Ward No. 1, Arghakhanchi, Nepal to Bhim Bahadur Kunwar and Dewaki Kunwar on 10th Shrawan, 2017 B.S..

== See also ==
- Prof. Dr. Govinda Bahadur Tumbahang
- Ratneshwar Lal Kayastha
- Anuradha Koirala
- Durga Keshar Khanal
