= Tilak Pariyar =

Nepali politician

- तिलक परियार

3rd Governor of Karnali Province
- In office 9 November 2021 – 31 July 2024
- President: Bidya Devi Bhandari
- Prime Minister: Sher Bahadur Deuba
- Chief Minister: Jeevan Bahadur Shahi
- Preceded by: Govinda Prasad Kalauni
- Succeeded by: Yagya Raj Joshi

2nd Governor of Madhesh Province
- In office 5 November 2019 – 19 February 2021
- President: Bidya Devi Bhandari
- Prime Minister: K. P. Sharma Oli
- Preceded by: Ratneshwar Lal Kayastha
- Succeeded by: Rajesh Jha

Member of the Constituent Assembly
- In office 28 May 2008 – 28 May 2012
- Preceded by: Gyanu K.C. (as Member of Parliament)
- Succeeded by: Dev Raj Bhar
- Constituency: Banke 1

Personal details
- Born: 31 October 1943 (age 82) Liwang, Rolpa, Nepal
- Spouse: Chandra Pariyar
- Children: 8 (4 son and 4 daughter)
- Parent(s): Hasta Bahadur Pariyar (father); Bhakti Devi Pariyar (mother)
- Education: B.A.

Tilak Pariyar (Nepali: तिलक परियार) is a Nepalese politician and former Governor of Karnali Province. He was appointed Governor, as per the Article 163 (2) of the Constitution of Nepal by the President Bidya Devi Bhandari on the recommendation of the Council of Ministers of the Government of Nepal on 9 November 2021. He previously served as the 2nd Governor of Province No. 2 of Nepal. He is former member of the 1st Nepalese Constituent Assembly from Banke-1 constituency.

== Personal life ==
Pariyar was born in Liwang, Rolpa district on 31 October 1943 to Hasta Bahadur Pariyar and Bhakti Devi Pariyar. He did his secondary education and Bachelor degree from India. Pariyar is married to Chandra Pariyar, with whom he has four sons and four daughters.
