= Rajesh Jha =

Nepali politician

Dr. Rajesh Jha
- डा. राजेश झा

3rd Governor of Madhesh Province
- In office 19 February 2021 – 18 August 2021
- President: Bidhya Devi Bhandari
- Prime Minister: KP Sharma Oli; Sher Bahadur Deuba
- Chief Minister: Lalbabu Raut
- Preceded by: Tilak Pariyar
- Succeeded by: Hari Shankar Mishra

Personal details
- Citizenship: Nepali
- Education: Tribhuvan University

Rajesh Jha is a Nepali politician and former Governor of Madhesh Province. He is a journalist and an advocate. He has completed Bachelor's level in law and also has done PhD from Tribhuvan University. In July 2026, he was convicted of rape by the Kathmandu District Court.

== Legal issues ==
On July 20, 2025, Jha was arrested in Kathmandu after an arrest warrant was issued following a formal police complaint. The complaint accused him of repeatedly raping a woman who had previously worked at his residence, with the victim alleging that an assault occurred on May 17, 2024.

On July 14, 2026, a single bench of the Kathmandu District Court, presided over by Judge Chandra Kanta Paudel, found Jha guilty of rape. In a subsequent sentencing hearing, the court sentenced Jha to seven years in prison. He was also fined Rs 300,000 and ordered to pay an additional Rs 300,000 in compensation to the victim.
