= Governor of Madhesh Province =

Position in the Nepal government

- मधेश प्रदेशका प्रदेश प्रमुख
- Incumbent; Surendra Labh Karna since 11 November 2025
- Government of Madhesh Province
- Style: The Honourable; His Excellency
- Status: Head of state
- Reports to: President of Nepal Government of Nepal
- Residence: Various
- Appointer: President of Nepal on the advice of the Government of Nepal
- Term length: 5 years
- Inaugural holder: Ratneshwar Lal Kayastha
- Formation: 2018
- Salary: 76,240 Nepalese rupees (NPR)

The Governor of Madhesh Province is the nominal head of state of the Nepal state (province) of Madhesh Province and a representative of the President of Nepal. The governor is appointed by the term president for a term of five years. The governor's powers are mostly ceremonial and the executive powers of the governor are exercised by the chief minister of Madhesh Province, who is the head of the executive of the state government of Madhesh Province. The following is a list of governors of Madhesh Province.

The incumbent, Surendra Labh Karna, has served as the governor of Madhesh Province since 11 November 2025.

== List of governors ==
No.	Name	Portrait	Took office	Left office	Tenure
1	Ratneshwar Lal Kayastha		19 January 2019	3 November 2019	288 days
2	Tilak Pariyar		5 November 2019	19 February 2021	1 year, 106 days
3	Rajesh Jha		19 February 2021	17 August 2021	179 days
4	Hari Shankar Mishra		17 August 2021	14 March 2024	2 years, 210 days
5	Sumitra Bhandari		15 March 2024	11 November 2025	1 year, 241 days
6	Surendra Labh Karna		11 November 2025	Incumbent	300 days

== See also ==
- Madhesh Province
- Chief Minister of Madhesh Province
