= Yagya Raj Joshi =

Nepalese politician (born 1950)

Honorable Yagya Raj Joshi
- यज्ञराज जोशी

4th Governor of Karnali Province
- Incumbent
- Assumed office 1 August 2024
- President: Ram Chandra Poudel
- Prime Minister: K. P. Sharma Oli
- Chief Minister: Yam Lal Kandel
- Preceded by: Tilak Pariyar

Personal details
- Born: 7 April 1950 (age 76) Bhatekhola, Bajhang
- Other political affiliations: Nepali Congress
- Children: 3

Yagya Raj Joshi (Nepali: यज्ञराज जोशी) is a Nepalese politician currently serving as the Governor of Karnali Province. He was appointed as Governor (प्रदेश प्रमुख), as per the Article 163 (2) of the Constitution of Nepal by the President Ram Chandra Poudel on the recommendation of the Council of Ministers of the Government of Nepal on 1 August 2024.

Academic Qualification:

1. BA (Bachelor of Arts)

Trichandra College, Tribhuwan University, Kathmandu

information:

1. Social Services: associated with Nepal Family Planning Association, Red Cross Society, JCI and other organizations.
2. Media and Advocacy: Founder, editor, and reporter for Mahakali Saptahik (later-Mahakali Daily) since 2043 BS to 2048 BS, where he consistently advocated for democratic values.
3. Party Leadership: Elected as Mahadiveshan and Mahasamiti member from the 8th to 14th General Conventions of Nepali Congress.
4. Mayoral Role: Elected Mayor of Mahendranagar Municipality (renamed as Bhimdutta Municipality)from 2049 -2054 BS.
5. Chairperson of "Town Development Fund, Mahendranagar (renamed as Bhimdatta Municipality)’’
6. Party Presidency: Elected as the Party President of the Nepali Congress for Kanchanpur district in 2062/2063 BS.
7. Nepali Congress Central Committee Membership:
  1. Invited central committee member during Sushil Koirala's presidency.
  2. Elected as a central committee member during the 14th General Convention.
8. Political Persecution: Imprisoned for 6 months during King Gyanendra’s direct rule.
