= Govinda Subba =

Govinda Bahadur Tumbahang गोविन्द बहादुर तुम्बाहाङ्ग

1st Governor of Koshi Pradesh
- In office 19 January 2018 – 3 November 2019
- President: Bidhya Devi Bhandari
- Prime Minister: Sher Bahadur Deuba
- Chief Minister: Sher Dhan Rai
- Preceded by: Position established
- Succeeded by: Somnath Adhikari

Personal details
- Born: 18 January 1958 (age 68) Chhatthar Jorpati Rural Municipality- 3, Dhankuta, Province No. 1, Nepal
- Party: Nepali Congress
- Profession: Provincial Governor
- Website: oph.p1.gov.np

Govinda Subba Limbu (Nepali: गोविन्द सुब्बा) is the first Governor of Province No. 1 of Nepal. In a meeting on 17 January 2018, the government of Nepal appointed him as the Chief of State of Province No. 1. He is a professor at Centre for Nepal and Asian Studies (CNAS) of Tribhuvan University. He was involved in Nepali Communist Movement with ANNFSU in Dhankuta before joining NC.

== See also ==
- Ratneshwar Lal Kayastha
- Anuradha Koirala
- Baburam Kunwar
- Durga Keshar Khanal
- Mohan Raj Malla
