= Governor of Karnali Province =

Nominal head of an Karnali

- कोशी प्रदेश प्रमुख
- Incumbent; Yagya Raj Joshi since 1 August 2024
- Government of Karnali Province
- Style: His Excellency
- Status: Head of state
- Reports to: President of Nepal
- Residence: Various
- Appointer: President of Nepal
- Term length: 5 years
- Formation: 2018 (8 years ago)
- Salary: 76,240 Nepalese rupees (NPR)

The governor of Karnali Province is the nominal head of state of the Karnali Province of Nepal and a representative of the President of Nepal. The governor is appointed by the President for a term of five years. The governor's powers are mostly ceremonial and the executive powers of the governor are exercised by the chief minister of Karnali Province, who is the head of the executive of the state government of Karnali Province.

The incumbent, Yagya Raj Joshi, is serving as the governor of Karnali Province since 1 August 2024.

== List of governors ==
No.	Name	Took office	Left office	Tenure
1	Durga Keshar Khanal	19 January 2019	3 November 2019	288 days
2	Govinda Prasad Kalauni	5 November 2019	9 November 2021	2 years, 4 days
3	Tilak Pariyar	11 November 2021	31 July 2024	2 years, 235 days
4	Yagya Raj Joshi	1 August 2024	Incumbent	2 years, 37 days

== Selection process ==
Article 164 of the Constitution of Nepal states that:

1. being qualified for being a member of the Federal Parliament,
2. having completed the age of thirty five years, and
3. not being disqualified by any law.
