= Dilli Raj Bhatta =

- डिल्लीराज भट्ट

5th Governor of Gandaki Province
- Incumbent
- Assumed office 17 March 2024
- Appointed by: President Ram Chandra Paudel
- Preceded by: Prithvi Man Gurung (Source: Gandaki Province appointment records)
- Succeeded by: None

Personal details
- Born: Dilli Raj Bhatta; B.S. 2007, Bhadra 14 ≈ 31 August 1950 (B.S. to A.D.)
- Citizenship: Nepal
- Other political affiliations: CPN–UML (Communist Party of Nepal – Unified Marxist Leninist), Formerly Nepali Congress (early career)
- Occupation: Politician, Governor (Province Chief), Long-time leftist political activist (underground during earlier political periods)

Dilli Raj Bhatta is the current Governor (Province Chief) of Gandaki Province, Nepal. He was appointed as the Province Chief on March 11, 2025, he assumed office on March 17, 2025. As a governor, he has emphasized the role an independent judiciary, ensuring the rule of law, peace, and prosperity. He is described as a veteran left-wing (communist leader from Sudurpaschim.

He originally began in Nepali Congress but later joined CPN-UML (Communist Party of Nepal - UML). In early years, he was involved underground with communist movements. After communist parties merged, he held leadership roles in Doti district as a coordinator for UML. After the unification of communist parties, he served as the head of the Sudurpachim region's party disciplinary commission. He also worked in the Seti Zone in the school department for the CPN-ULM party.

He was nominated for Gandaki Province Chief by the national government and he has made several key certifications and appointments in his role for example he certified a civil service ordinance for Gandaki Province. He also appointed Surendra Raj Pandey as Chief Minister of Gandaki under Article 168 (3) of the Nepali constitution. There was some controversy around him as the HimalPress reports that he made a government formation decision (appointing a CM) which some saw as unconstitutional or legally debatable.

Dilli Raj Bhatta's home/birthplace is Jorayal (जोरायल) in Doti District, in Sudurpashchim Province. He was born in Bikram Sambat (विक्रम संवत्) 2004 in Jorayal Doti. He lived in Dhangadhi. Jorayal was not just his birthplace but also a place where he spent significant years politically and socially active there.

Bhatta argues that democracy, human rights, and the rule of law are complementary pillars and that people should responsibly exercise their rights while being mindful of others' rights for a just society. He also expressed respect for the National Human Rights Commission's role as the commission's work helps build a culture of human rights and legal accountability.

Father: Tilakh Bhatta तिलकराज भट्ट

Mother: Madhu मधुदेवी भट्ट

He has several siblings; three sisters, one brother.
