= Hari Shankar Mishra =

Nepali politician

Honourable Hari Shankar Mishra
- हरि शंकर मिश्र

4th Governor of Madhesh Province
- In office 17 August 2021 – 15 March 2024
- President: Ram Chandra Poudel Bidhya Devi Bhandari
- Prime Minister: Pushpa Kamal Dahal Sher Bahadur Deuba
- Chief Minister: Saroj Kumar Yadav Lalbabu Raut
- Preceded by: Rajesh Jha
- Succeeded by: Sumitra Bhandari

Member of House of Representatives
- In office 1991–1994
- Constituency: Mahottari 2

Personal details
- Citizenship: Nepali
- Party: Nepali Congress(?-2021)
- Parent: Ram Narayan Mishra (father)

Hari Shankar Mishra is the current Governor of Madhesh Province. He was appointed Governor, as per the Article 163 (2) of the Constitution of Nepal by the President Bidya Devi Bhandari on the recommendation of the Council of Ministers of the Government of Nepal on 17 August 2021. He is a former member of House of representatives.

== Political life ==
Before being appointed Governor, he was member of the Nepali Congress party. He was elected to the House of representatives from Mahottari-2 in the 1991 Nepalese general election with a margin of 4,000 votes.

== Personal life ==
Mishra's father, Ram Narayan Mishra, was one of the founders of the Nepali Congress, and served as Minister for Industry and Commerce in the B.P. Koirala cabinet which was elected in 1959 as the first elected government of Nepal. Mishra's uncle, Bhadrakali Mishra, was also a politician, who was a government minister in the 1950s.

== Electoral history ==
=== 1991 legislative elections ===
Party	Candidate	Votes
Nepali Congress	Hari Shankar Mishra	13,165
Independent		9,389
Result	Congress gain	
