= Surendra Labh Karna =

Nepali politician

- सुरेन्द्र लाभ कर्ण

6th Governor of Madhesh Province
- Incumbent
- Assumed office 11 November 2025
- President: Ram Chandra Poudel
- Prime Minister: Sushila Karki; Balen Shah
- Chief Minister: Saroj Kumar Yadav; Krishna Prasad Yadav
- Preceded by: Sumitra Bhandari

Member of National Planning Commission of Nepal
- In office 3 September 2021 – 2022

Personal details
- Born: Janakpurdham, Dhanusha, Nepal
- Citizenship: Nepali
- Education: Babasaheb Bhimrao Ambedkar Bihar University

Surendra Labh Karna is a Nepalese writer, economist, former member of National Planning Commission of Nepal who is serving as the 6th Governor of Madhesh Province. He was appointed as a governor on 11 November 2025 by the decision of Council of Ministers of Nepal, after sacking Sumitra Bhandari amidst appointment of Saroj Kumar Yadav as a Chief Minister of Madhesh Province.

== Early life and education ==
Surendra Labh Karn was born in Janakpurdham, Dhanusha, Nepal. He holds Ph.D. in economics from Babasaheb Bhimrao Ambedkar Bihar University, India. He taught economics and political science as a professor in Ramswarup Ramsagar Multiple Campus afiiliated to Tribhuvan University.
