= Ratneshwar Lal Kayastha =

Nepalese politician

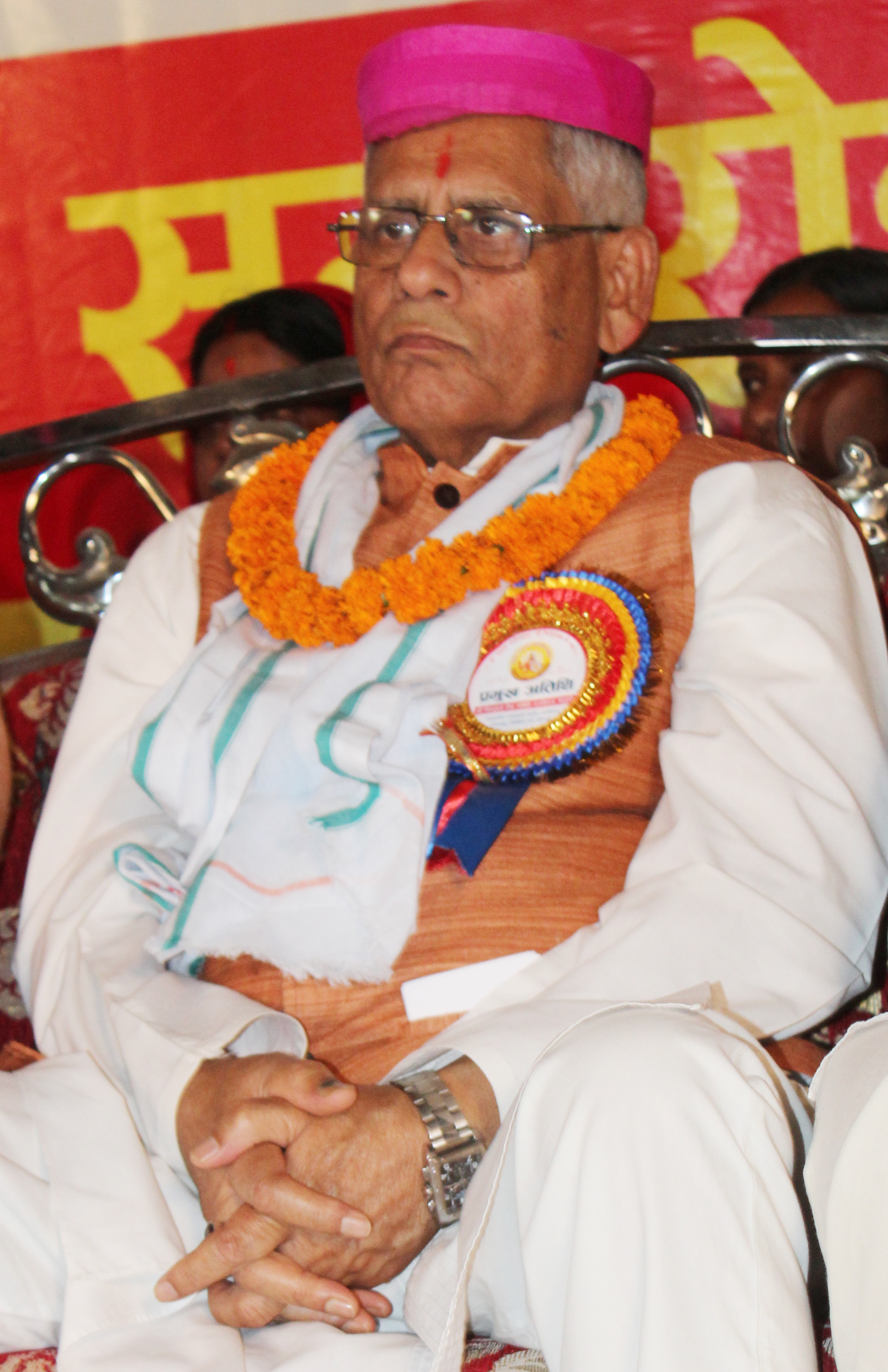
- Ratneshwar Lal Kayastha at Chitragupta Sewa Samiti- Golden Jubilee Ceremony, Rajbiraj in 2018.

1st Governor of Madhesh Province
- In office 19 January 2018 – 3 November 2019
- President: Bidhya Devi Bhandari
- Prime Minister: Sher Bahadur Deuba
- Preceded by: Position established
- Succeeded by: Tilak Pariyar

Spokesperson and Secretary of Federal Socialist Forum, Nepal
- In office 2004-2018

Personal details
- Born: 3 May 1944 (age 82) Suga Bhawani (now Jaleshwar), Mahottari, Province No. 2, Nepal
- Party: Federal Socialist Forum, Nepal
- Spouse: Sabita Kayastha
- Children: 4
- Education: Engineering geology
- Alma mater: Imperial College London
- Website: oph.p2.gov.np

Ratneshwar Lal Kayastha (born 3 May 1944) is a Nepalese politician and former Governor of Province No. 2. He was appointed as a governor of Province No. 2 by the Government of Nepal on 17 January 2018. He served as a Governor of Province No. 2 from 19 January 2018 to 3 November 2019.

Earlier, he was the Secretary at Ministry of Agriculture and Director General at Department of Irrigation, Nepal. Kayastha began his political career with Federal Socialist Forum, Nepal in the 2004.

== Early life and education ==
Ratneshwar Lal Kayastha was born at Suga Bhawani (now Jaleshwar), Mahottari on 3 May 1944 to Lal Kishore Lal & Achakmani Devi. His father was a secondary level Teacher. He was passed School Leaving Certificate (SLC) in 1st division from Laxmi Chand Murarka Higher Secondary School in Jaleshwar and earned an Intermediates degree with Science from Tri-Chandra College, Kathmandu. He further studied Bachelor of Technology (B. Tech.) from the same college and later he moved to IIT, Kharaghpur and Imperial College London for higher education degree.

== Civil service career ==
Kayastha joined Civil services of Nepal as an Engineer in 1964.

== See also ==
- Prof. Dr. Govinda Bahadur Tumbahang
- Anuradha Koirala
- Baburam Kunwar
- Durga Keshar Khanal
- Mohan Raj Malla
