= Ranjeet Karna =

Nepalese politician, former student leader, and commentator

- रञ्जित कर्ण

Member of the 2nd Nepalese Constituent Assembly
- In office 2013–2017
- Constituency: Proportional Representation

President of Nepal Student Union (NSU)
- In office 2012–2016
- Preceded by: Pradip Paudel
- Succeeded by: Nain Singh Mahar

Personal details
- Party: Nepali Congress

Ranjeet Karna (रञ्जित कर्ण) is a Nepalese politician, columnist, and former student leader affiliated with the Nepali Congress. He served as a member of the 2nd Nepalese Constituent Assembly from 2013 to 2017 through the proportional representation quota.

== Nepal Student Union Leadership ==
Karna was elected President of the Nepal Student Union (NSU), the student wing of the Nepali Congress, in 2012.

During his tenure:

- The NSU held its long-delayed 11th General Convention from 14 to 16 September 2014—the only convention conducted during his presidency.
- He advocated for the timely organization of Free Student Union elections at Tribhuvan University campuses and raised concerns over delays and interference.
- Under his leadership, NSU protested against issues such as fee hikes, examination postponements, and administrative delays affecting students.

== Constituent Assembly ==
Karna was elected to the 2nd Constituent Assembly of Nepal through the proportional representation list in the 2013 elections.

As a member, he:

- Advocated for inclusive federalism, especially focused on the rights and representation of the Madheshi community.
- Emphasized youth participation, internal party reform, and proportional inclusion in governance structures.

== Media and Commentary ==
Karna is a regular columnist and political commentator in Nepali media. He has contributed to national newspapers and digital platforms on topics such as:

- Democratic transformation within political parties
- Anti-corruption governance
- Identity politics and youth leadership

He frequently appears on televised debates and public forums.

== Legacy ==
Ranjeet Karna is recognized for:

- Organizing the only NSU General Convention during his presidential tenure (2014)
- Reviving Free Student Union activism across major universities
- Advocating for Madhesh inclusion and youth engagement in national policymaking
