= Prithvi Man Gurung =

Nepali politician (1949–2025)

Honourable Prithivi Man Gurung
- पृथ्वीमान गुरुङ

4th Governor of Gandaki Province
- In office 27 July 2021 – 14 March 2024
- President: Bidhya Devi Bhandari; Ram Chandra Poudel
- Prime Minister: Sher Bahadur Deuba; Pushpa Kamal Dahal
- Chief Minister: Krishna Chandra Nepali Pokharel; Khagaraj Adhikari; Surendra Raj Pandey
- Preceded by: Sita Kumari Poudel
- Succeeded by: Dilli Raj Bhatta

Personal details
- Born: 13 April 1949
- Died: 26 July 2025 (aged 76)
- Party: Nepali Congress (?–2021)
- Website: oph.gandaki.gov.np

Prithvi Man Gurung (13 April 1949 – 26 July 2025) was a Nepalese politician who was Governor of Gandaki Province. He was appointed by President Bidhya Devi Bhandari on recommendation of the council of ministers of the federal government on 27 July 2021. He succeeded Sita Kumari Poudel. Gurung died on 26 June 2025, at the age of 76.
