= Krishna Chandra Nepali Pokharel =

Nepalese politician and former Chief Minister of Gandaki Province

- कृष्ण चन्द्र नेपाली पोखरेल
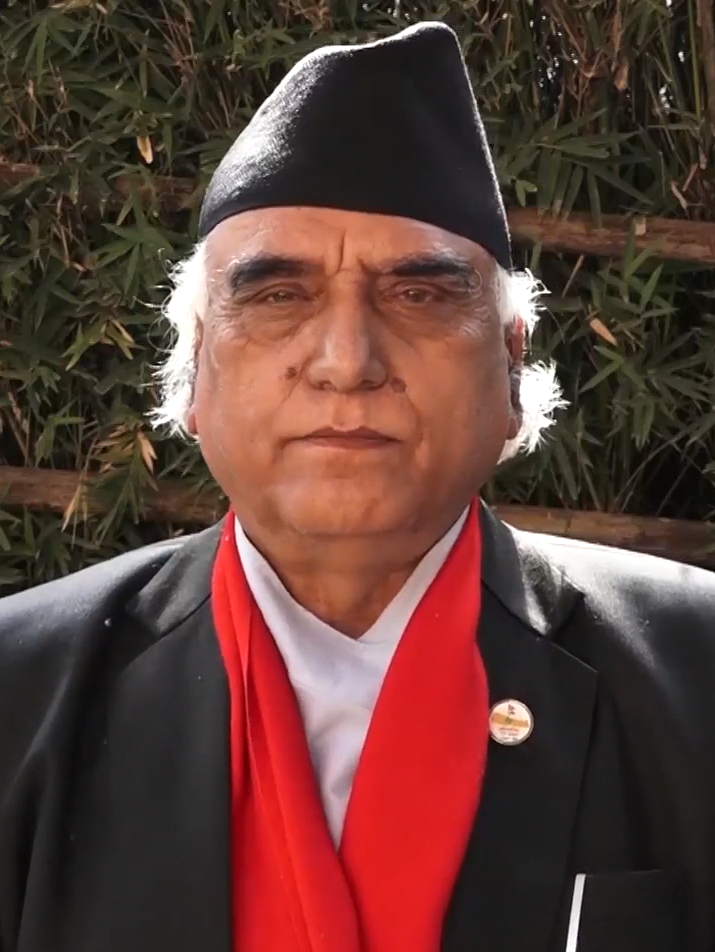

2nd Chief Minister of Gandaki Province
- In office 12 June 2021 – 10 January 2023
- Governor: Sita Kumari Poudel; Prithvi Man Gurung
- Preceded by: Prithvi Subba Gurung

Province Assembly Member of Gandaki Province
- Incumbent
- Assumed office 2017
- Constituency: Nawalparasi East 1(A)
- Preceded by: Constituency Created

Personal details
- Born: Tanahunsur, Tanahun
- Party: Nepali Congress
- Spouse: Lata Pokharel
- Children: Ranjana, Tarun, Shreejana, and Milap Pokharel
- Parent(s): Govardhan Sharma and Draupada Pokharel
- Education: Bachelor of Laws, LLB
- Cabinet: Krishna Chandra Nepali Cabinet
- Website: ocmcm.gandaki.gov.np

Krishna Chandra Nepali Pokharel (Nepali: कृष्णचन्द्र नेपाली पोखरेल), also known as Krishna Chandra Nepali, is a Nepalese politician and Chief Minister of Gandaki Province. He was unanimously selected Parliamentary Party leader of Nepali Congress for Gandaki Province after potential CM candidate Pradip Poudel lost in his constituency with less than 100 vote's margin. Nepali is ex-member of NC central committee.

He is the second chief minister of Gandaki and first chief minister from Nepali Congress, according to Article 168 (5) of the Constitution of Nepal by the support of NC, CPN-MC, PSP-N, Rastriya Janamorcha and Independent Deepak Manange. All the opposition had supported him to be next chief-minister of Gandaki Province submitting to Governor a list of majority signatures as Prithivi Subba Gurung failed to get vote of confidence in assembly as per Article 168 (4) of the Constitution of Nepal.

== Political life ==
He was elected to the Central Committee of the Nepali Congress from Lumbini Zone at the 12th General Convention of the Nepali Congress. Before being elected as a central member, he was elected as the president of Nepali Congress Nawalparasi for four times (1991 - 2010) and before that he was a member of the district working committee.

Nepal who have been active in politics for the past four decades have repeatedly spent more than three years in prison during the movement to restore democracy in this country. He lived in exile in India with his father, Govardhan Sharma. Along with his political life, he taught political science, geography and history in the high schools of Kavre Falante, Tanahu Damauli and Tanahu Tharpu for a long time.

During the referendum of 1980, he was sent to Jumla as an in charge of Nepali Congress to motivate people to vote in favour of Multi-party system. Later he left the education sector and devoted himself to pro-people legal service as an advocate.

== Personal life ==
Krishna Chandra Nepali Pokharel is a fighter of Nepali democracy and was central member of Nepali Congress party and second eldest son of freedom fighter late. Govardhan Sharma.

Key events of life: (using BS calendar dates; Bikram Samvat; AD dates given at end of each event)

From 2022 to 2028: Life in exile in India with Father the late Govardhan Sharma (c. 1965 to 1971 AD)

From 2029 to 2036: Teaching in Kavre Falante, Tanahu Damauli and Tanahu Tharpu High Schools (c. 1972 to 1979 AD)

2035: Active leadership in the student movement. Active leadership in the referendum of 2036 BS (Nepali Congress wins in Tanahun) (c. 1978 AD)

2037: Election boycott (jail chalan) (c. 1980 AD)

2046: First Jana Andolan (jail run) (c. 1989 AD)

2048: Satyagraha (jail challan). Nepali Congress candidate in Nawalparasi-4 in 2048 BS election (c. 1991 AD)

From 2048 to 2067: President, Nepali Congress, Nawalparasi (c. 1991 to 2011 AD)

2062/63: Second Jana Andolan (jail run) (c. 2006 to 2007 AD)

2067: Elected to the Central Committee of the Nepali Congress (c. 2010 AD)

2070: In the 2070 CA election, Nawalparasi constituency no. 3 Nepali Congress candidates for direct party (c. 2013 AD)

2074: Gandaki Province Nawalparasi East elected 1-1 in the historic first state assembly election of the Federal Democratic Republic of Nepal (c. 2017 AD)

2075: Gandaki Province unanimously elected as the leader of the Nepali Congress parliamentary party (c. 2018 AD):

2078: Chief Minister of Gandaki Province

== See also ==
- Rajendra Kumar Rai
- Lalbabu Raut
- Rajendra Prasad Pandey
- Kul Prasad KC
- Jeevan Bahadur Shahi
- Trilochan Bhatta

Political offices
Preceded by Prithvi Subba Gurung	Chief Minister of Gandaki Province; 2021	Succeeded by incumbent
