= Sita Kumari Poudel =

Nepalese politician

- सिता कुमारी पौडेल

Governor of Gandaki Province
- In office 3 May 2021 – 27 July 2021
- President: Bidhya Devi Bhandari
- Chief Minister: Prithvi Subba Gurung; Krishna Chandra Nepali Pokharel
- Preceded by: Amik Sherchan
- Succeeded by: Prithvi Man Singh Gurung

Personal details
- Born: 9 February 1958 (age 68)
- Citizenship: Nepali
- Spouse: Unmarried
- Parent(s): Krishna Prasad Poudel (father); Revati Poudel (mother)
- Education: Bachelor

Sita Kumari Poudel (Nepali: सिता कुमारी पौडेल) is the former Governor of Gandaki Province. She was Appointed Governor, as per the Article 163 (2) of the Constitution of Nepal by the President Bidya Devi Bhandari on the recommendation of the Council of Ministers of the Government of Nepal on 3 May 2021. She was the prime minister's public relations advisor. She was also the chairperson of the All Nepal Women's Association, a women's organization of the CPN UML.

== Personal life ==
Sita Kumari Poudel was born on 9 February 1958 in a Brahmin family as the Daughter of Krishna Prasad Poudel and Revati Poudel.She is unmarried.

== See also ==
- Karnali Province
- Governor (Nepal)
