= Madhesh Province =

Province of Nepal

Madhesh Province मधेश प्रदेश
- Province
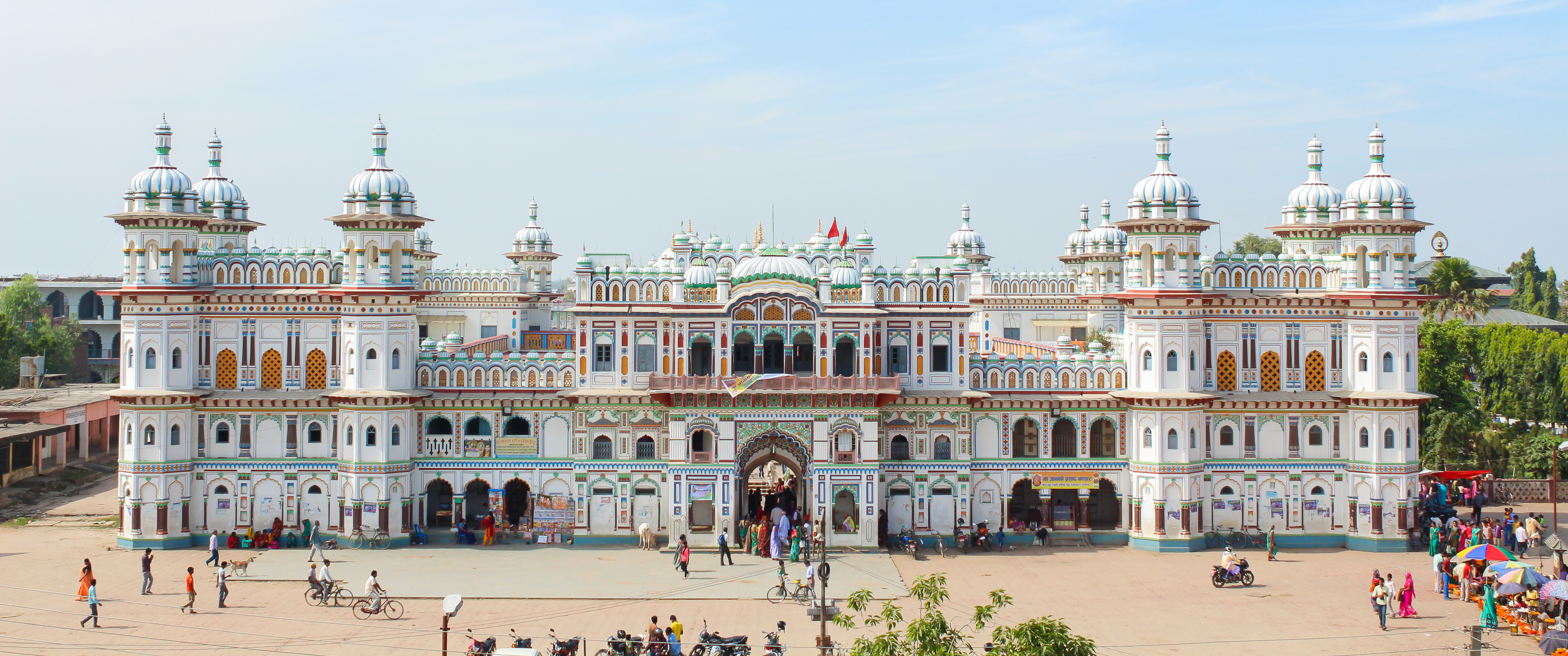
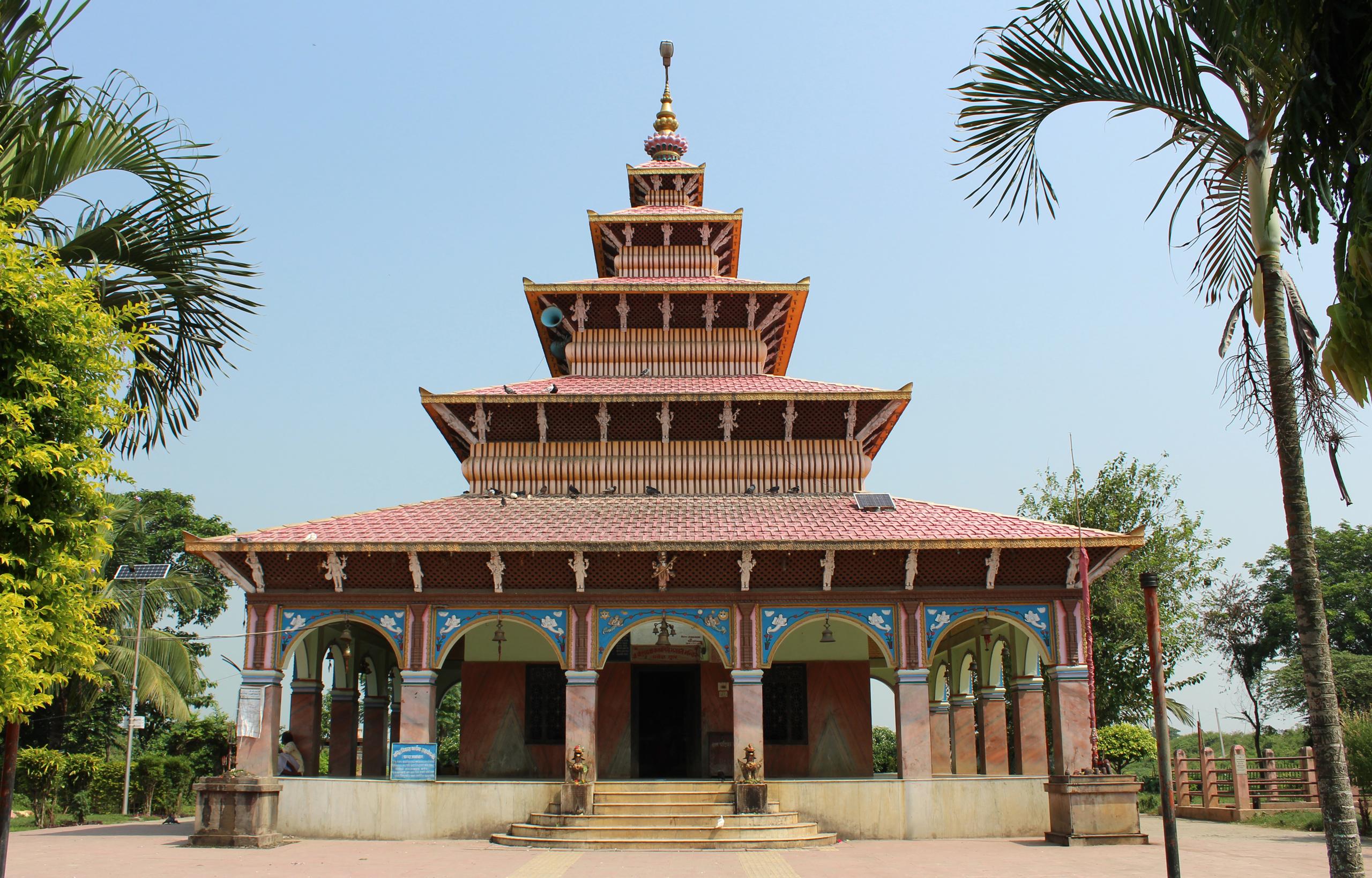
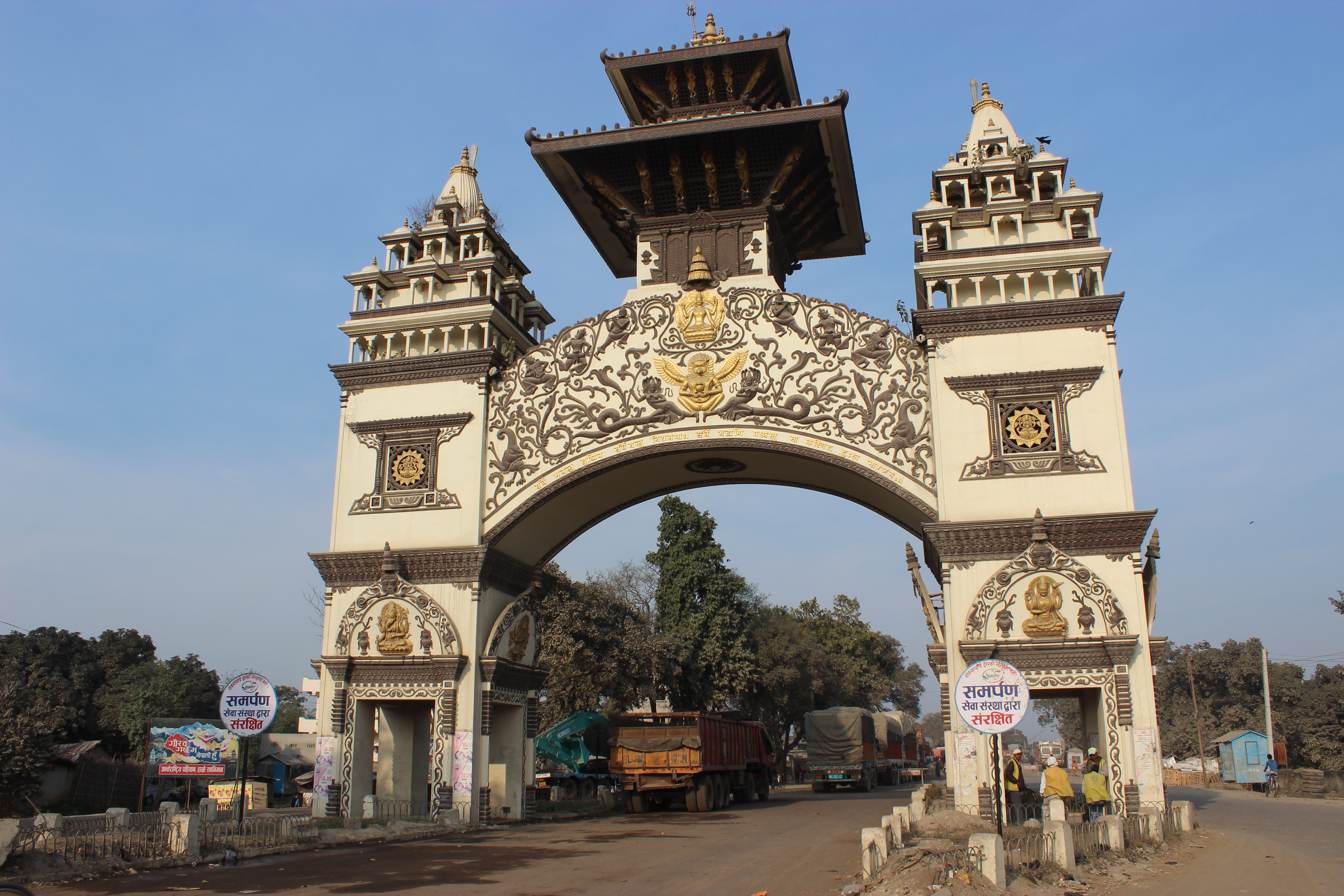
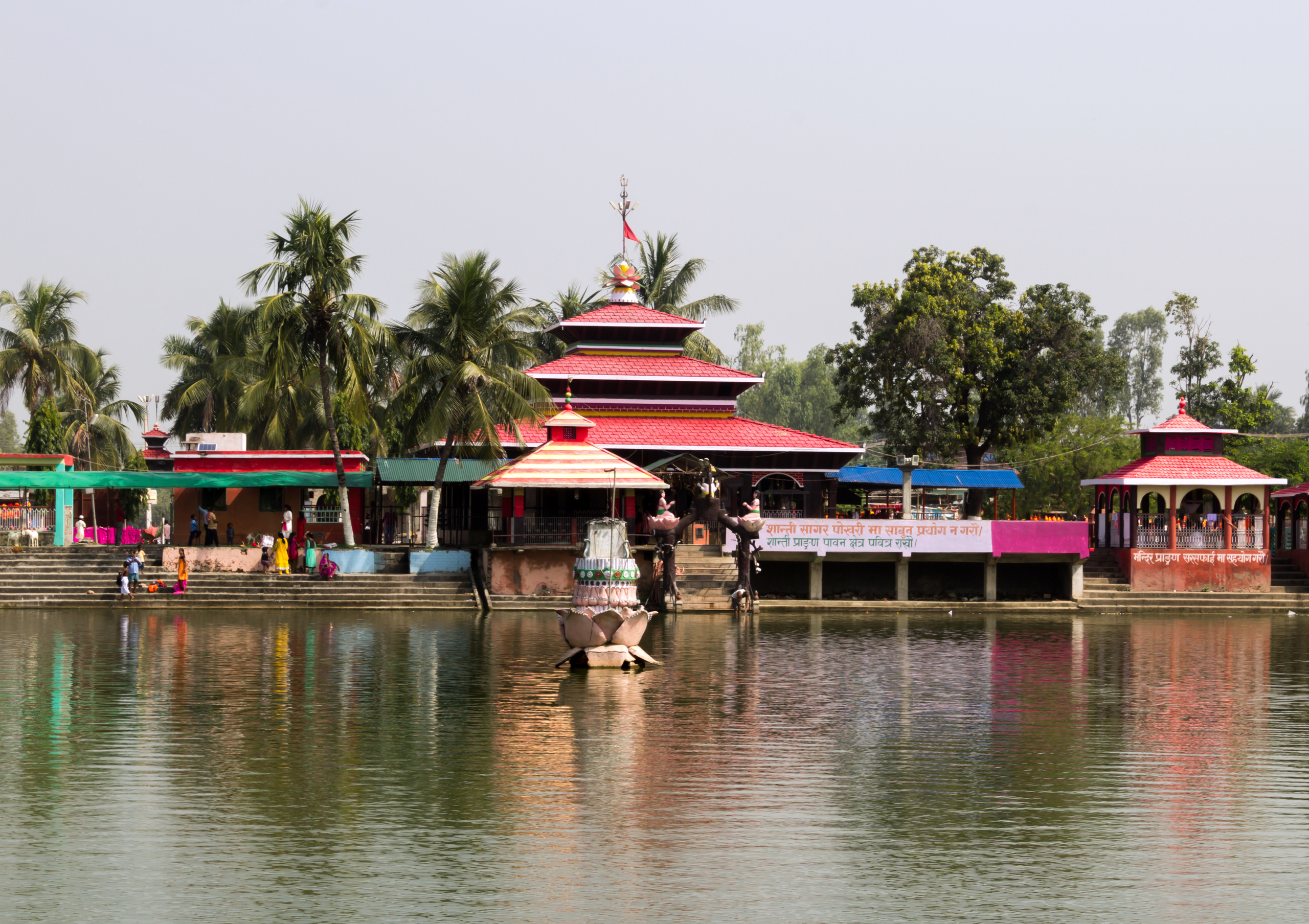
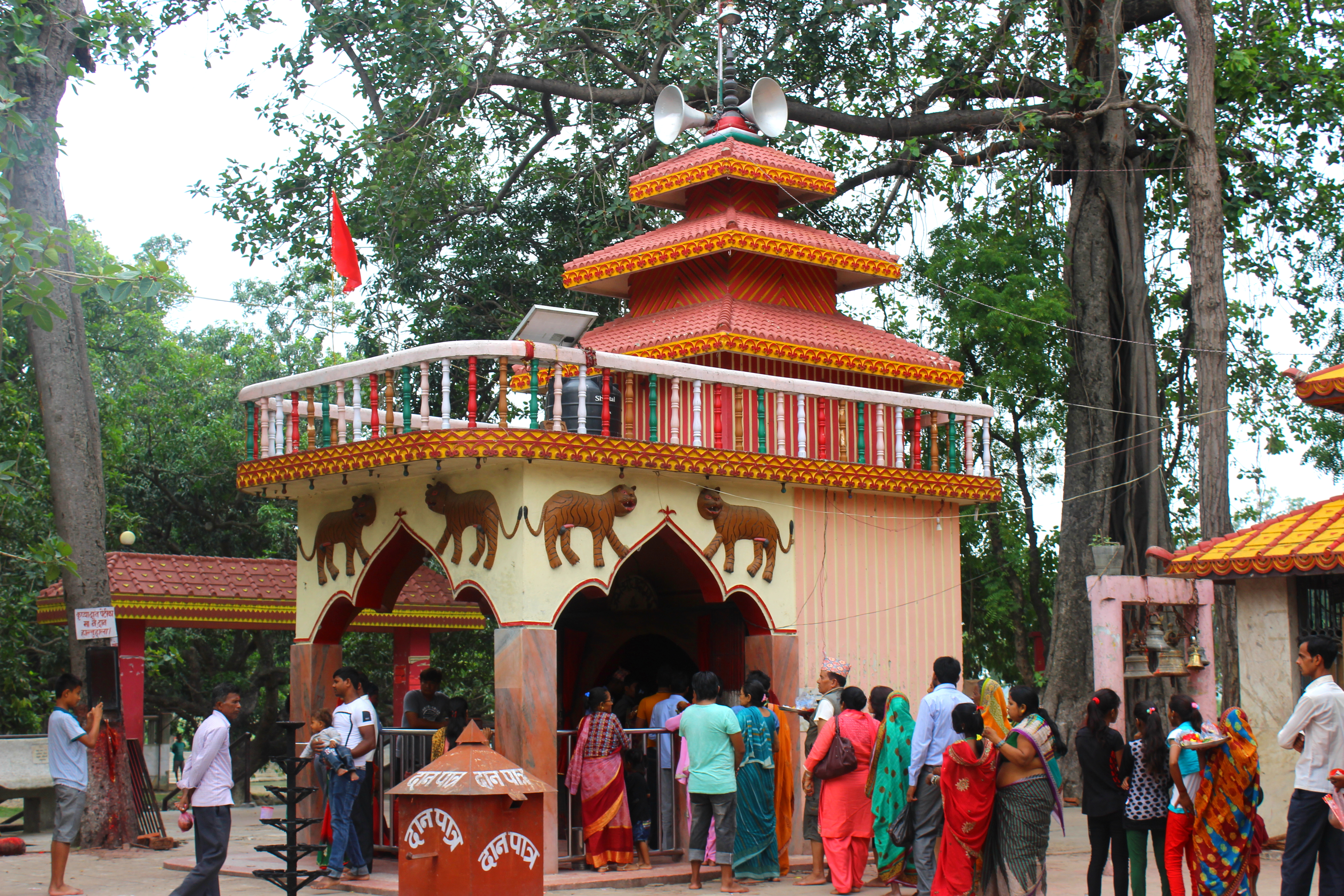
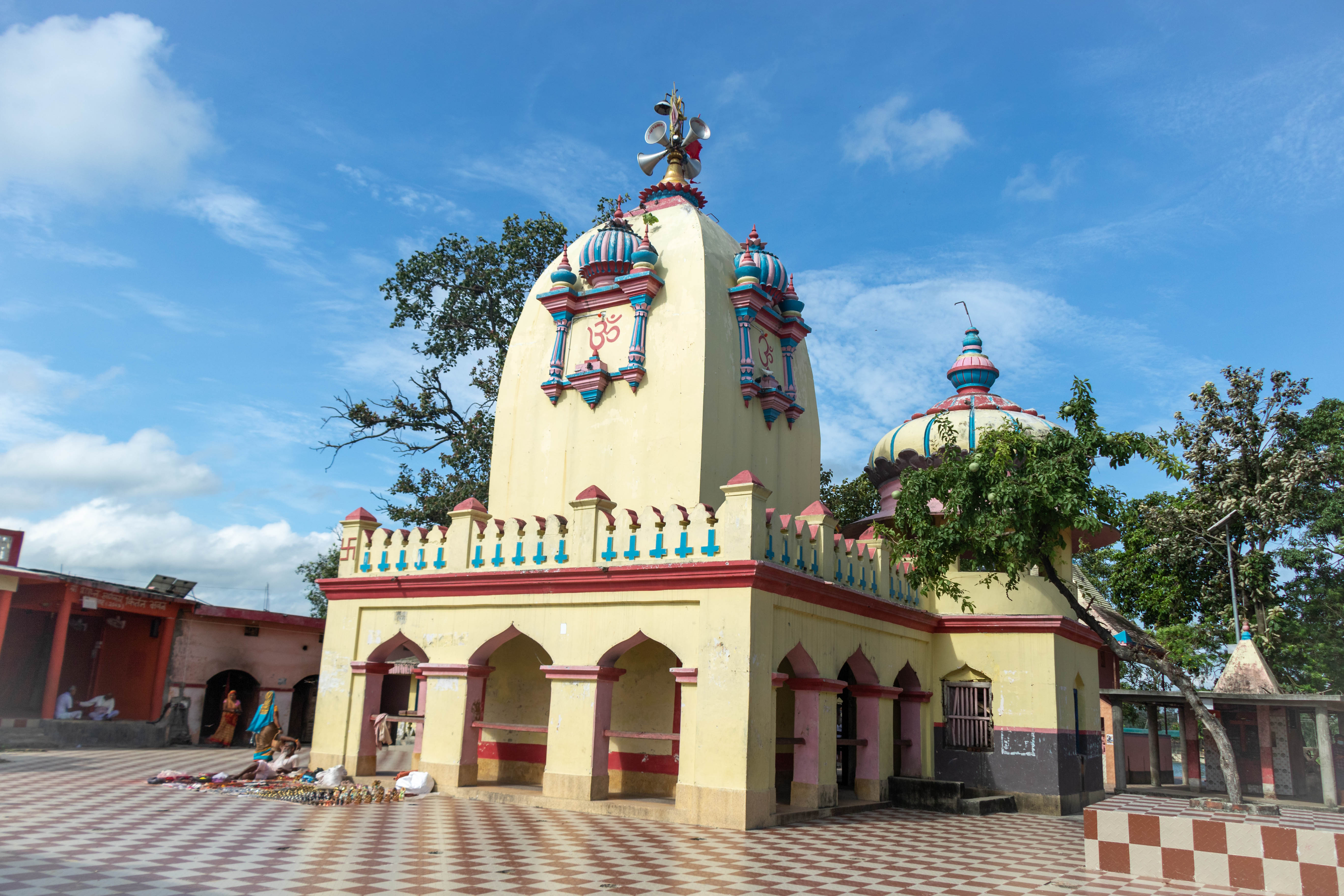
- Clockwise from top: Janaki Mandir, Kankalini Temple, Gateway of Nepal Birgunj, Chinnamasta Bhagawati Temple, Gadhimai Temple and Jaleshwar Mahadev Temple

- Seal

- Location of Madhesh Province

- Map of Madhesh Province, Nepal
- Interactive map of Madhesh Province
- Province of: Nepal
- HPI: ▼Low
- Formation: 20 September 2015
- Capital city: Janakpur
- Largest city: Birgunj
- Districts: List: Saptari District; Siraha District; Dhanusha District; Mahottari District; Sarlahi District; Rautahat District; Bara District; Parsa District

Government
  - Type: Autonomy
  - Body: Government of Madhesh Province
  - Governor: Surendra Labh Karna
  - Chief Minister: Saroj Kumar Yadav (PSP, Nepal)
  - High Court: Janakpur High Court
  - Provincial Assembly: Unicameral (107 seats)
  - House of Representatives: 32 constituencies

Area
  - Total: 9,661 km^{2} (3,730 sq mi)
  - Rank: 7th
- Elevation: 102 m (335 ft)
- Highest elevation: 920 m (3,020 ft)
- Lowest elevation (Musharniya): 58 m (190 ft)

Population (2021)
  - Total: 6,114,600
  - Rank: 2nd
  - Density: 632.9/km^{2} (1,639/sq mi)
  - Rank: 1st
- Time zone: UTC+5:45 (Nepal Time)
- Area codes: 041, 031, 033, 046, 053, 051, 044, 055
- ISO 3166 code: NP-P2
- Languages: Nepali (official) Maithili (official) Bhojpuri (official); Bajjika (official) Tharu (additional-official); Tamang (additional-official) Urdu Others
- HDI: 0.519 (low)
- Literacy: 63.5% ▲ (2024)
- Sex ratio: 100.55 ♂ / 100 ♀ (2021)
- Website: madhesh.gov.np

Madhesh Province (Maithili: मधेश प्रदेश, romanized: Madhēś pradēś) is a province of Nepal in the Terai region with an area of 9,661 km^{2} (3,730 sq mi) covering about 6.5% of the country's total area. It has a population of 6,114,600 as per the 2021 Nepal census, making it Nepal's most densely populated province and the smallest province by area. It borders Koshi Pradesh to the east and the north, Bagmati Province to the north, and India’s Bihar state to the south and the west. The border between Chitwan National Park and Parsa National Park acts as the provincial boundary in the west, and the Kosi River forms the provincial border in the east. The province includes eight districts, from Parsa in the west to Saptari in the east. It is a centre for religious and cultural tourism.

== Etymology ==
The word madhesh is thought to be derived from the Sanskrit madhya desh (मध्य देश), literally the middle country, which refers to "the central region, the country lying between the Himalaya and the Vindhya mountains". However, in the context of Nepal, Madhesh refers to the region in the Nepal Terai located south of the Siwalik Hills. Madhesh has also been defined as the cultural and linguistic space existing as a basis for identity among the people of the Terai.

== History ==
Madhesh Province was founded with the provisional name Province No. 2 in September 2015 in accordance with Schedule 4 of the Constitution of Nepal. It received its current name on 17 January 2022, when the provincial assembly declared Janakpur as its capital.

== Geography ==
As per the Central Bureau of Statistics, Madhesh Province covers about 9,661 km^{2} (3,730 sq mi) of Nepal's total area of 147,516 km^{2} (56,956 sq mi). With 6,114,600 inhabitants as of 2021, it is Nepal's second most populous province. Madhesh Province is surrounded by the Chitwan District to the west, Makwanpur District and Sindhuli District and Udayapur District to the north, Sunsari District to the east, and India to the south. The province has 574,360 ha (1,419,300 acres) of arable land, making it the country's most agriculture-dominated province. The west of the province contains part of Parsa National Park, while part of Koshi Tappu Wildlife Reserve lies within the east. The province is biodiverse and is crossed by migrating elephants.

Largest cities or towns in Madhesh Province Central Bureau of Statistics
Rank		District	Pop.	Rank		District	Pop.
1	Birgunj	Parsa	240,922	11	Bardibas	Mahottari	66,354
2	Janakpur	Dhanusha	159,468	12	Ishwarpur	Sarlahi	59,986
3	Kalaiya	Bara	123,659	13	Lalbandi	Sarlahi	59,395
4	Jeetpur Simara	Bara	117,496	14	Jaleshwor	Mahottari	58,549
5	Lahan	Siraha	91,766	15	Mahagadhimai	Bara	54,474
6	Siraha	Siraha	82,531	16	Golbazar	Siraha	51,137
7	Chandrapur	Rautahat	72,059	17	Garuda	Rautahat	50,481
8	Barahathwa	Sarlahi	69,822	18	Mirchaiya	Siraha	50,079
9	Rajbiraj	Saptari	69,086	19	Simraungadh	Bara	49,939
10	Gaushala	Mahottari	66,673	20	Manara Shiswa	Mahottari	49,692

=== Climate ===
Average temperatures and precipitation for selected communities in Madhesh Province
Location	August (°F)	August (°C)	January (°F)	January (°C)	Annual Precipitation (mm/in)
Gaur	91/77.9	23/9.1	73.4/48.4	32.8/25.5	1590.2/62.6
Siraha	89.6/76.3	32/24.6	72.1/47.3	22.3/8.5	1293.1/50.9
Birgunj	84.7	29.3	60.8	16	1862.2/73.3
Jaleshwar	84.4	29.1	61.2	16.2	1492.9/58.8
Malangawa	84.4	29.1	60.8	16	1817.7/71.6
Janakpur	84.2	29	60.8	16	1516.5/59.7
Rajbiraj	83.3	28.5	60.4	15.8	1223.3/48.2
Lahan	83.3	28.5	60.3	15.7	1231.4/48.5

== Demographics ==
According to the 2021 Nepal census, the province has a population of 6,114,600: 3,065,751 males and 3,048,849 females. The province with 20.97% of the country's population has the second-highest population after Bagmati Province in the country, and is the densest province in the country with a density of 633 people per square kilometre.

Ethnic groups in Madhesh Province
1. Yadav (15.2%)
2. Muslim (13.0%)
3. Teli (5.31%)
4. Tharu (4.92%)
5. Kushwaha (4.51%)
6. Chamar (4.41%)
7. Dhanuk (3.55%)
8. Kurmi (2.95%)
9. Musahar (2.93%)
10. Paswan (2.88%)
11. Mallaah (2.32%)
12. Kanu (2.27%)
13. Other Madheshi non-Dalit (20.1%)
14. Other Madheshi Dalit (5.51%)
15. Hill Janajati (4.61%)
16. Khas (3.39%)
17. Others (2.22%)

=== Ethnic groups ===
Maithils are the largest ethnolinguistic group. Yadav is the largest group among the Madhesi people in the province making up around 15.2% of the population. Muslims are the second largest group making up 13% of the population. Teli (5.3%), Kushwaha(koeri) (4.5%), Chamar (4.4%), Kurmi (3.0%), Musahar (2.9%), Dusadh (2.79%), Mallaah (2.26%), Maithil Brahmin (2.2%), and Karan Kayastha (1.5%) are other Madhesi pandit (8.0) groups in the province. Bahun and Chhetri are the largest Khas Arya groups in the province making up 2.34% and 1.99% of the population, respectively. Tharu (5.27%) and Dhanuk (3.49%) is the largest non-Madhesi, non-Khas Arya group followed by Tamang (2.17%).

=== Languages ===
Maithili language speakers in Madhesh Province

The Maithili language is spoken by 45.36% of the total population of the province. Bhojpuri is spoken by 18.81% and Bajjika is spoken by 18.44% of the population. Nepali is the province's official language, but is spoken as mother tongue by only 5.76% of the population. Tharu (4.17%), Urdu (4.08%), and Tamang (1.65%) are other languages spoken by a minority of the population.

The Language Commission of Nepal has recommended Maithili, Bhojpuri and Bajjika as official languages of the province, and Urdu, Tharu and Tamang as additional official languages for specific regions and purposes in the province.

Languages of Madhesh Province (2021)
1. Maithili (41.7%)
2. Bhojpuri (18.8%)
3. Bajjika (18.4%)
4. Nepali (5.76%)
5. Tharu (4.17%)
6. Urdu (4.08%)
7. Magahi (3.52%)
8. Tamang (1.65%)
9. Others (1.84%)

=== Religion ===
Religion in Madhesh Province (2021)
1. Hinduism (84.2%)
2. Islam (13.3%)
3. Buddhism (2.21%)
4. Other or not stated (0.34%)

Hinduism is the most followed religion in the province, being followed by 84.24% of the population. Islam is the second largest religion with 13.28% of the population being Muslims, and Buddhism is followed by 2.21% of the population.

== Government and administration ==
=== Executive ===
The Governor acts as the head of the province, while the Chief Minister is the head of the provincial government. The present Governor and Chief Minister are Surendra Labh Karna and Saroj Kumar Yadav respectively.

=== Legislative ===
The province has 107 provincial assembly constituencies and 32 constituencies.

Madhesh Province has a unicameral legislature, like all of the other provinces in Nepal. The term length of provincial assembly is five years. The Provincial Assembly of Madhesh Province is temporarily housed at the District Education Office in Janakpur.

Party	Parliamentary party leader	Seats
CPN (UML)	Saroj Kumar Yadav	25
Nepali Congress	Krishna Prasad Yadav	22
People's Socialist Party, Nepal	Saroj Kumar Yadav	19
Janamat Party	Mahesh Prasad Yadav	13
Loktantrik Samajwadi Party	Abhiram Sharma	9
CPN (Maoist Centre)	Bharat Prasad Sah	9
CPN (Unified Socialist)	Govinda Bahadur Neupane	7
Rastriya Prajatantra Party		1
Nepal Federal Socialist Party		1
Nagrik Unmukti Party		1
Total		107

=== Judiciary ===
The Chief Judge of the Janakpur High Court is the head of the judiciary. The acting chief justice is Binod Sharma.

=== Administrative subdivisions ===
Madhesh Province is divided into eight districts, which are listed below. A district is administrated by the head of the District Coordination Committee and the District Administration Officer. The districts are further divided into municipalities or rural municipalities. The municipalities include one metropolitan city, three sub-metropolitan cities, and 73 municipalities. There are 59 rural municipalities in the province.

Name	Headquarters	Population (2011)
Dhanusha District	Janakpur	754,777
Sarlahi District	Malangawa	769,729
Bara District	Kalaiya	687,708
Rautahat District	Gaur	686,722
Saptari District	Rajbiraj	639,284
Siraha District	Siraha	637,328
Mahottari District	Jaleshwar	627,580
Parsa District	Birgunj	601,017

== Infrastructure ==
=== Roadways ===
Mahendra Highway is the major highway in the province running longitudinally across the province. The Tribhuvan Highway also crosses a part of the province and connects it to the Kathmandu Valley and India.

=== Railways ===
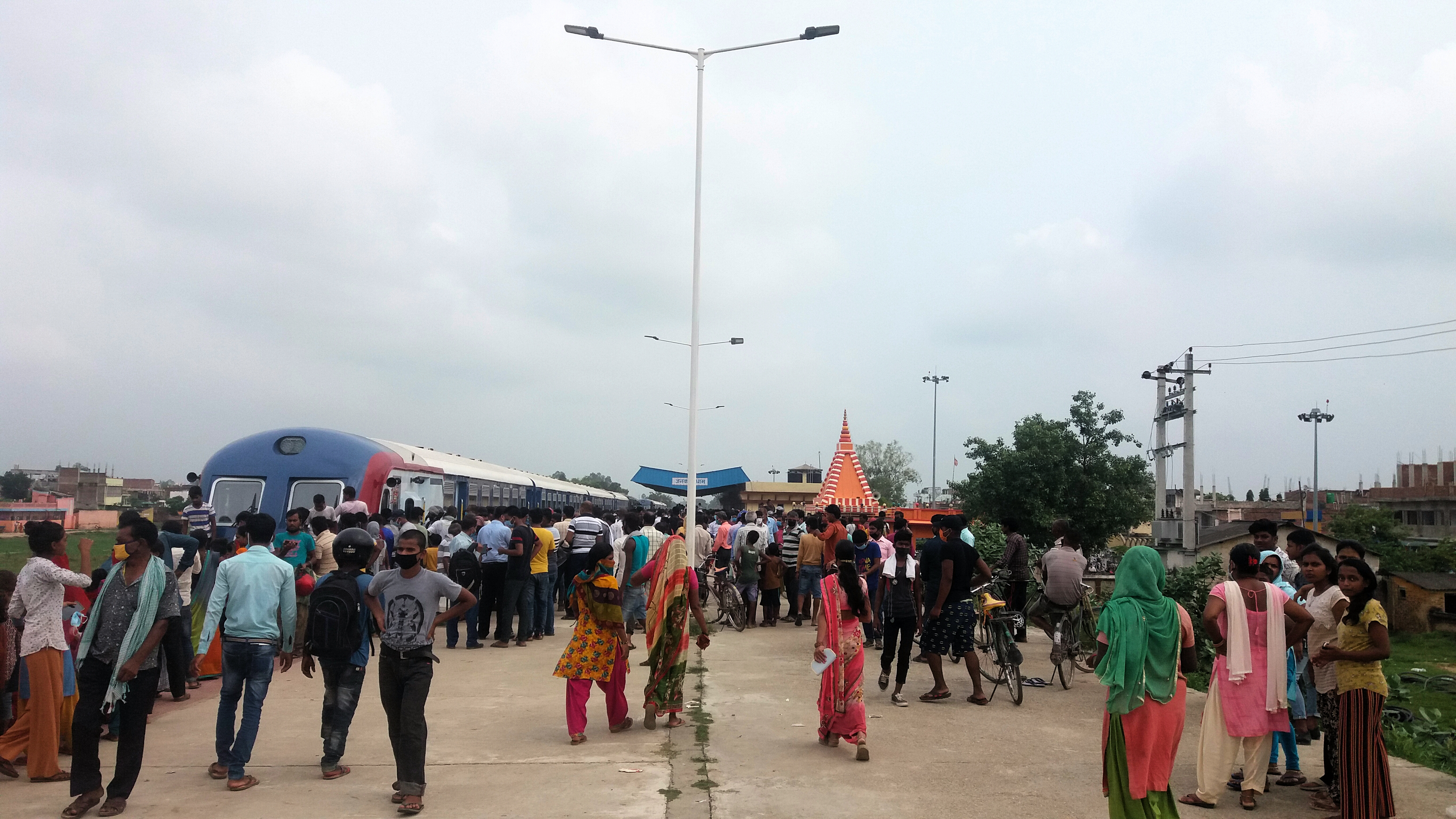
Janakpur Train Station is the largest Railway Station in Nepal

Railway projects are managed by Nepal Railways. Janakpur has been proposed as the main station for the 1,024 km (636 mi) long east–west metro railway project that is planned to be extended to India and China for connecting Nepal Railways with Indian Railways and China Railway.

=== Airports ===
Madhesh Province has three domestic airports:

- Rajbiraj Airport in Rajbiraj
- Janakpur Airport in Janakpur
- Simara Airport in Pipara Simara close to Birgunj and Kalaiya

Under construction Airport:

- Nijgadh International Airport

== Culture ==
=== Mithila Paag ===
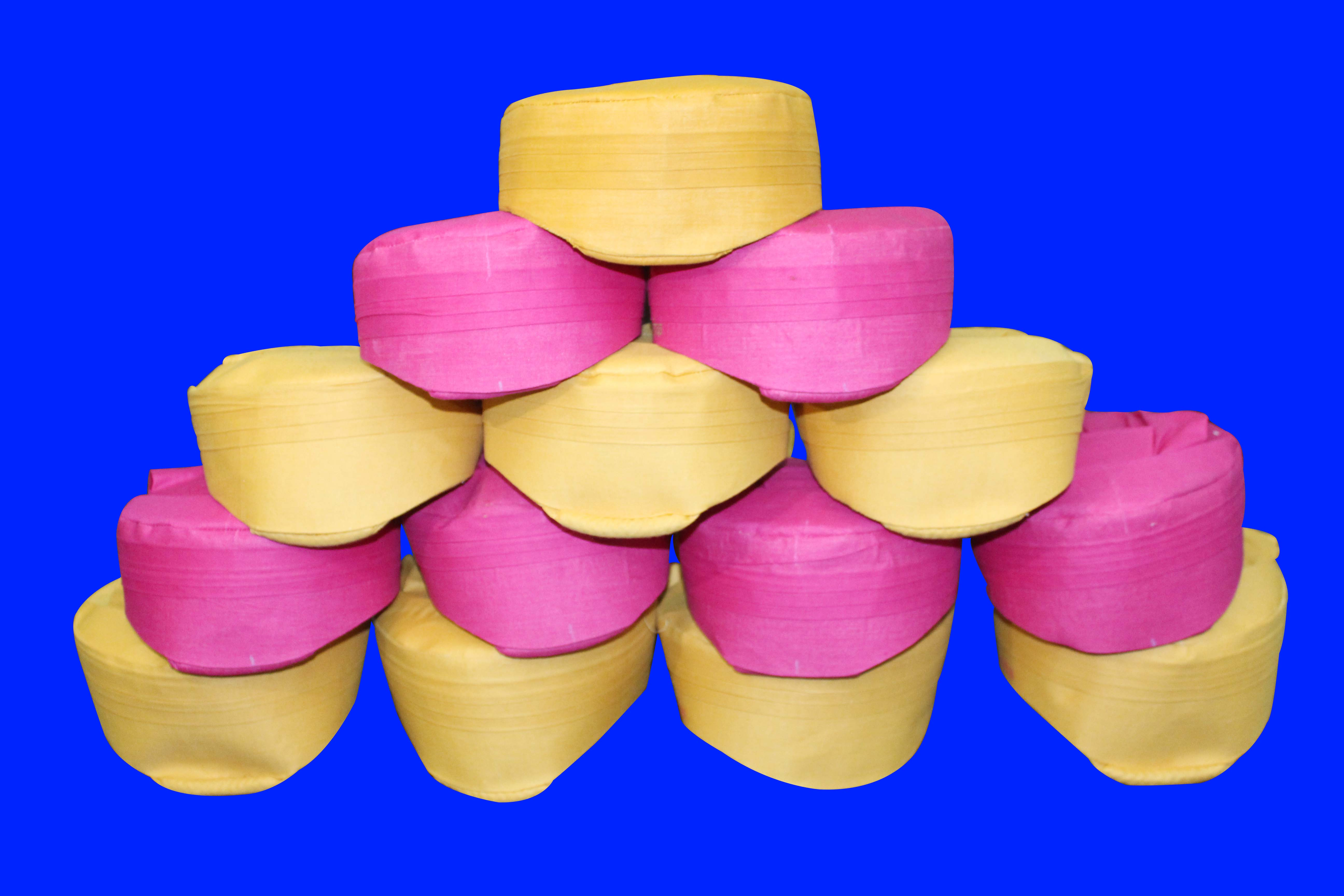
Mithila Paag

The Paag is a headdress in the Mithila region of Nepal and India worn by Maithil people. It is a symbol of honour and respect and a significant part of Maithil culture. The Paag dates back to pre-historic times when it was made of plant leaves. It exists today in a modified form. The Paag is wore by the whole Maithil community. The colour of the Paag also carries a lot of significance. The red Paag is worn by the bridegroom and by those who are undergoing the sacred thread rituals. Paag of mustard colour is donned by those attending wedding ceremonies and the elders wear a white Paag.

=== Paintings ===
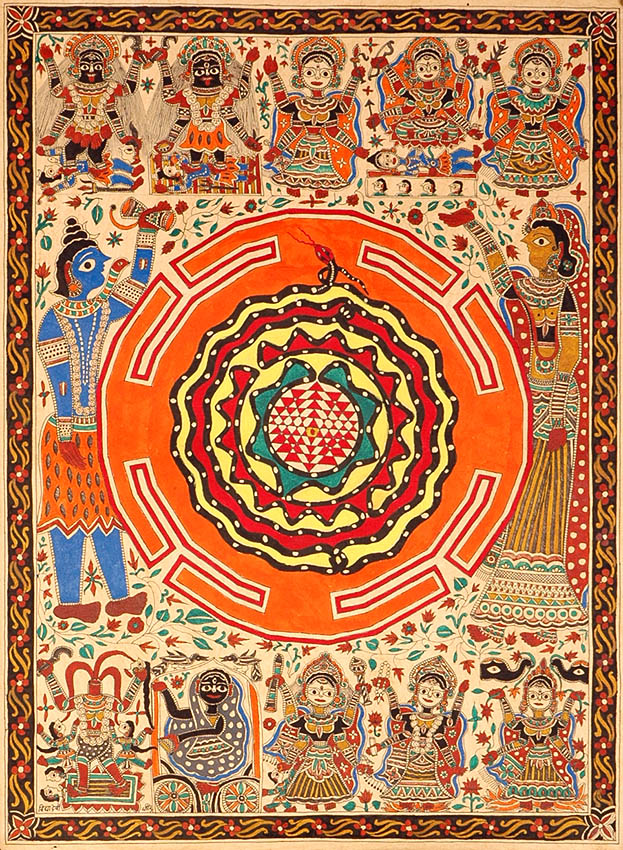
Mithila painting featuring God Shiva-Parvati and the Mahavidyas

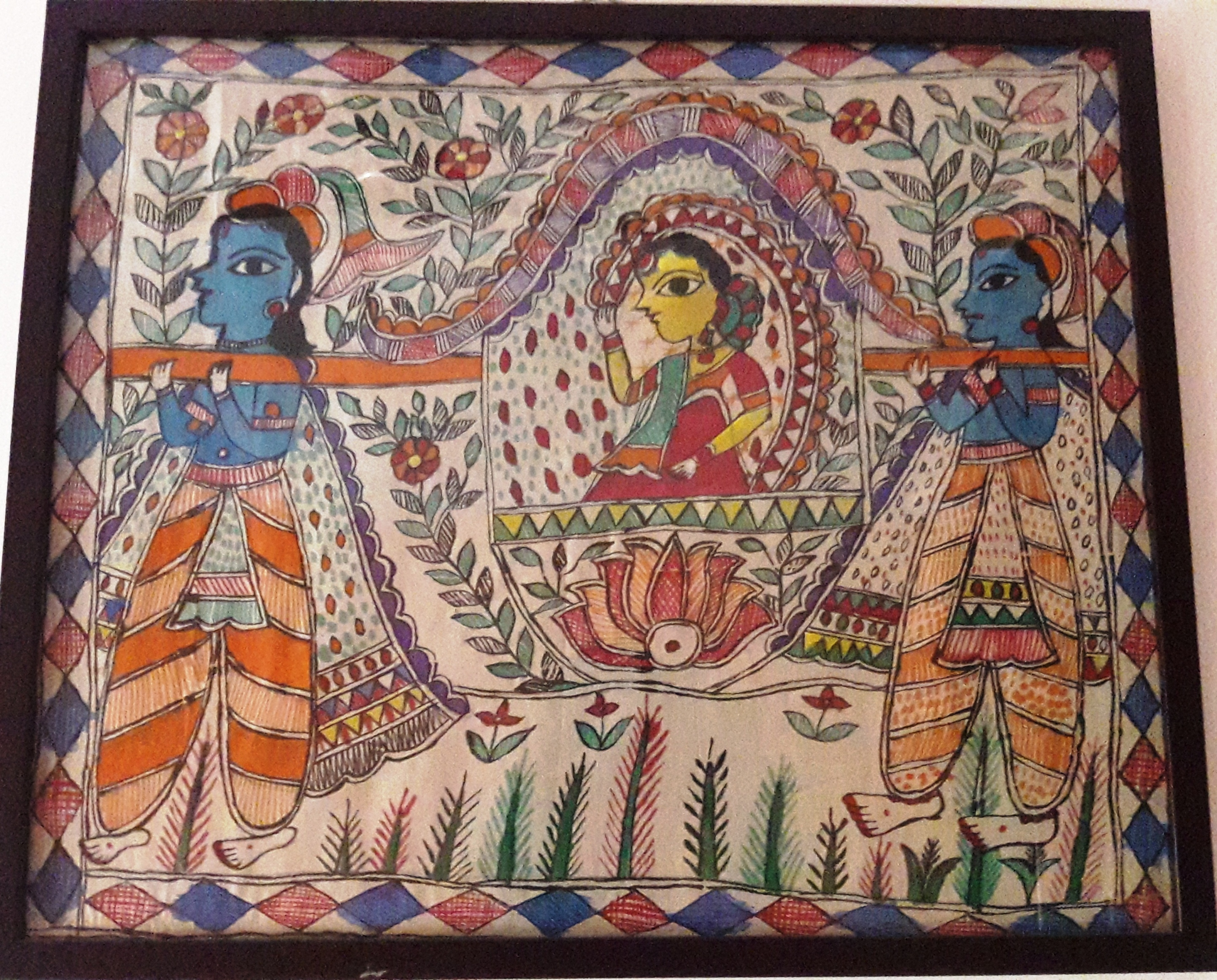
Madhubani_art

Madhubani art is practiced in the Mithila region. It was traditionally created by the women of different communities of the Mithila region. This painting as a form of wall art was practiced widely throughout the region; the more recent development of painting on paper and canvas originated among the villages around Madhubani, and it is these latter developments that may correctly be referred to as Madhubani art.

=== Cuisine ===
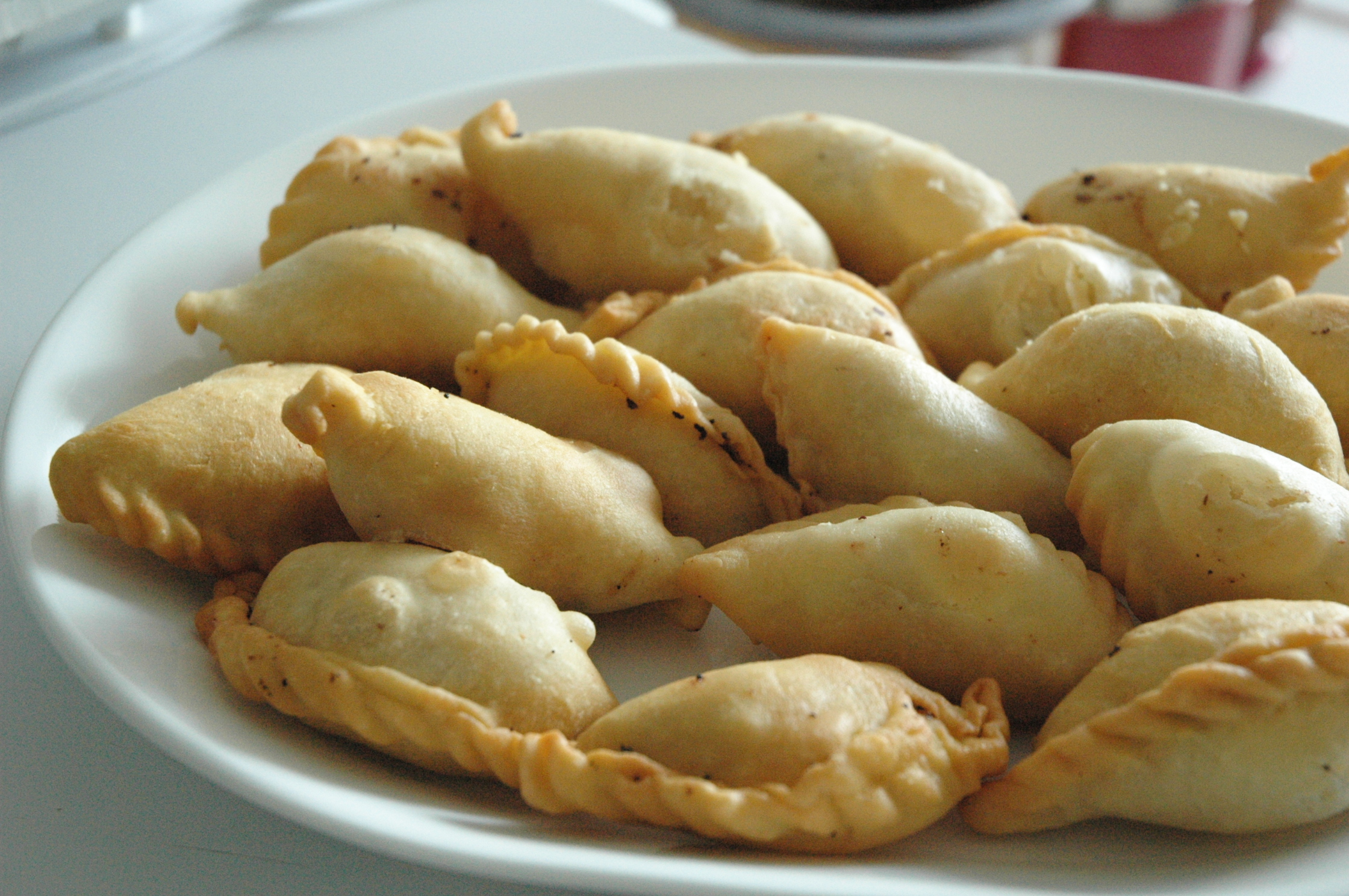
Gujiya

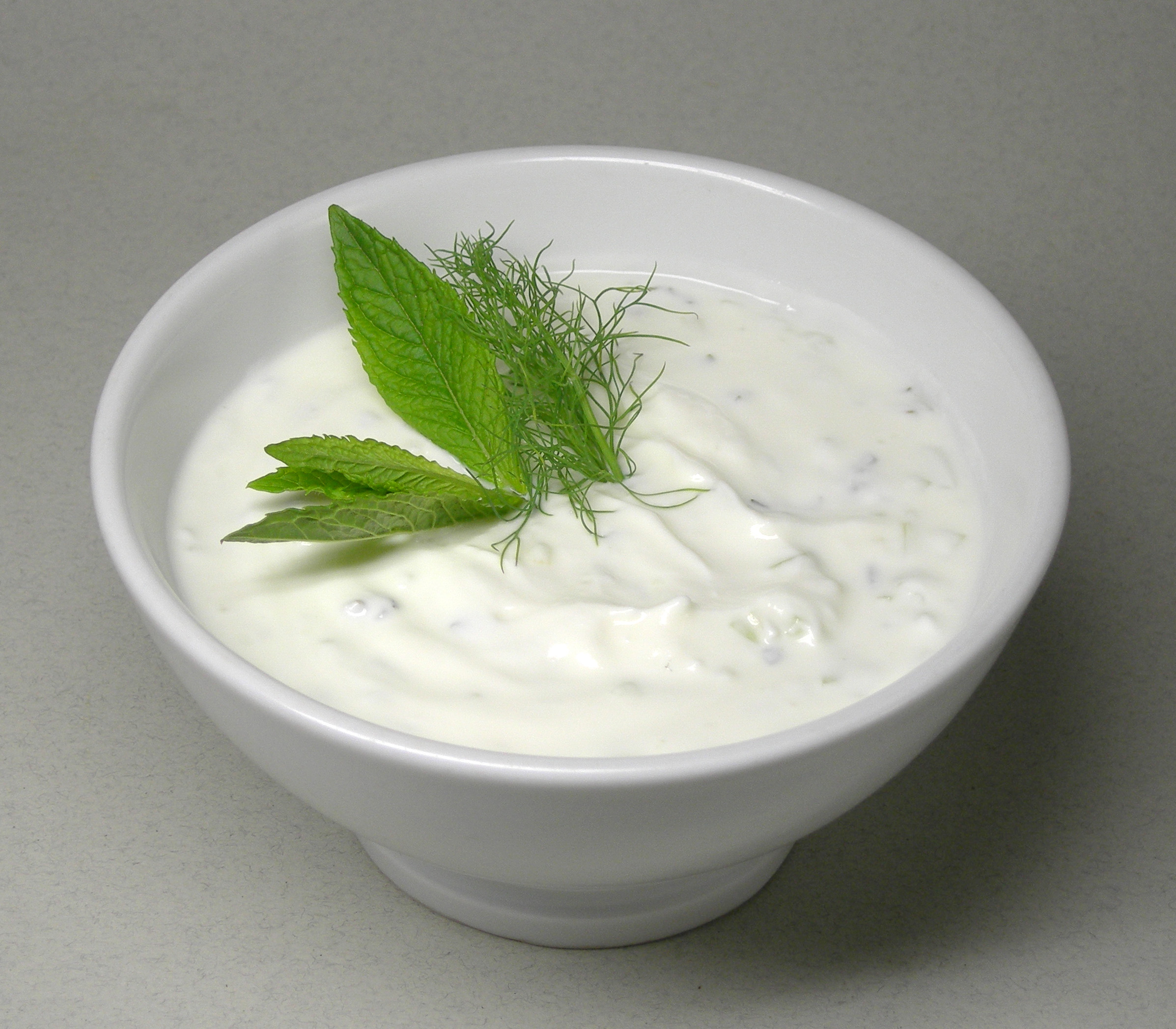
Yoghurt

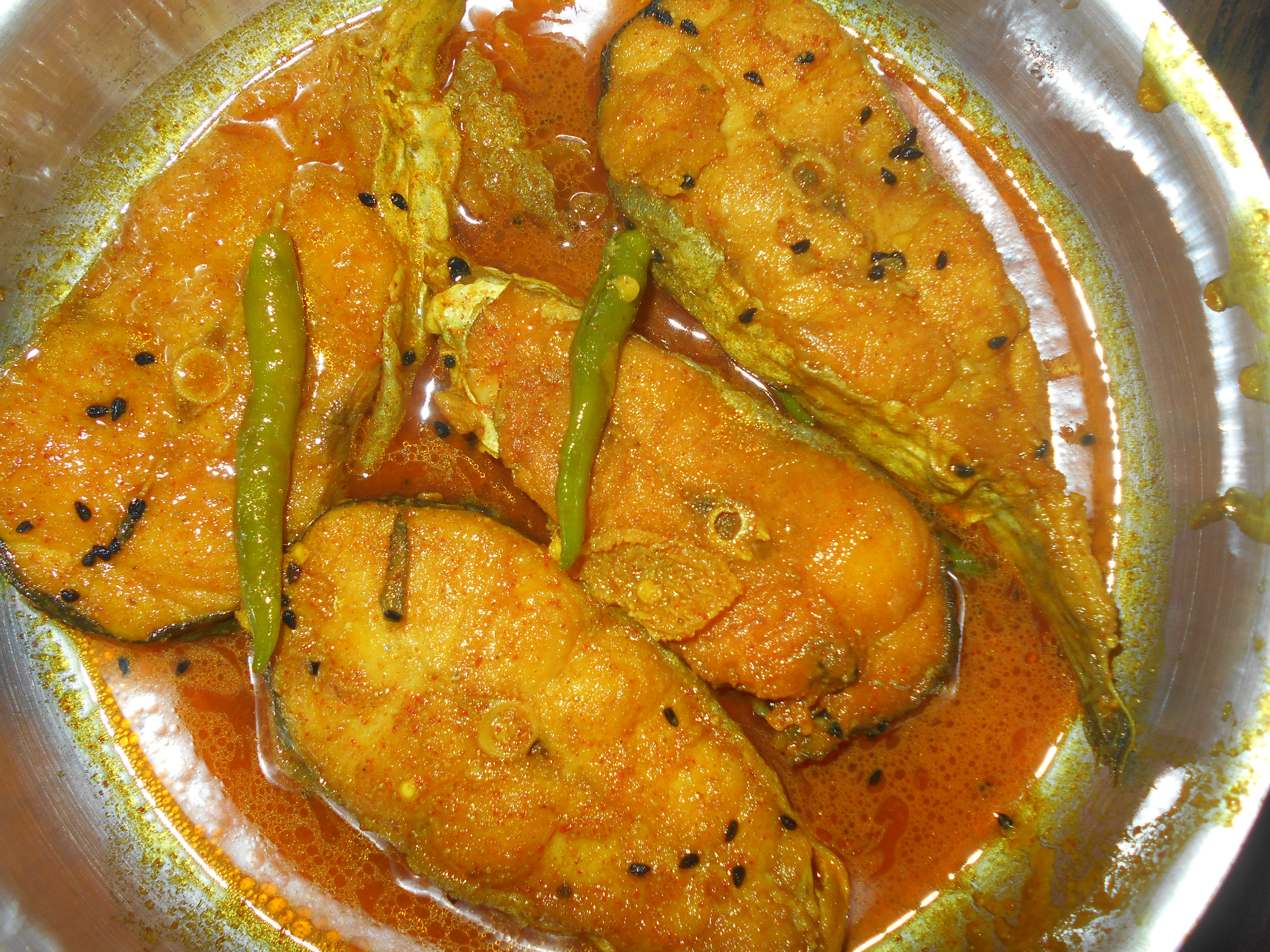
Machher Jhol

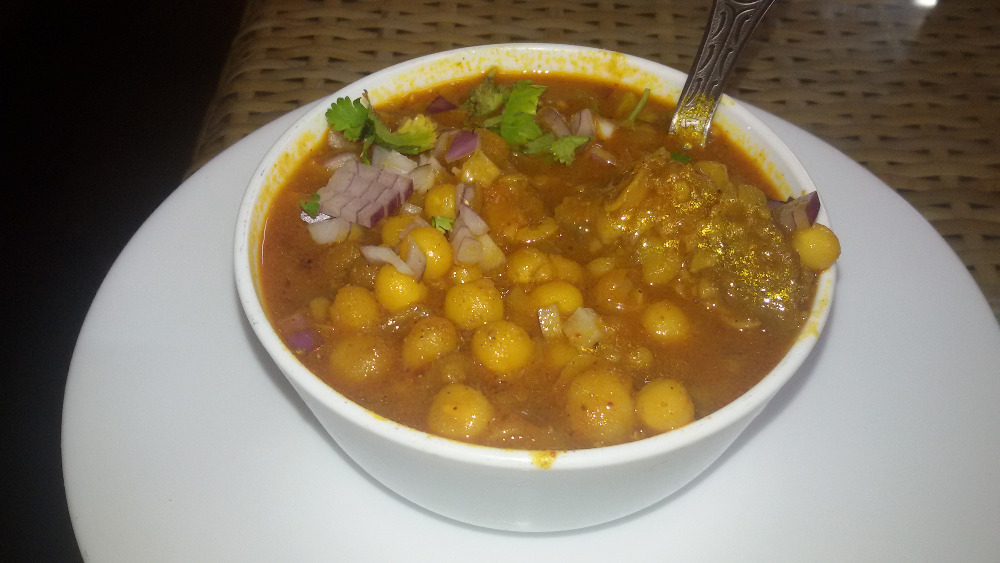
Ghughnee

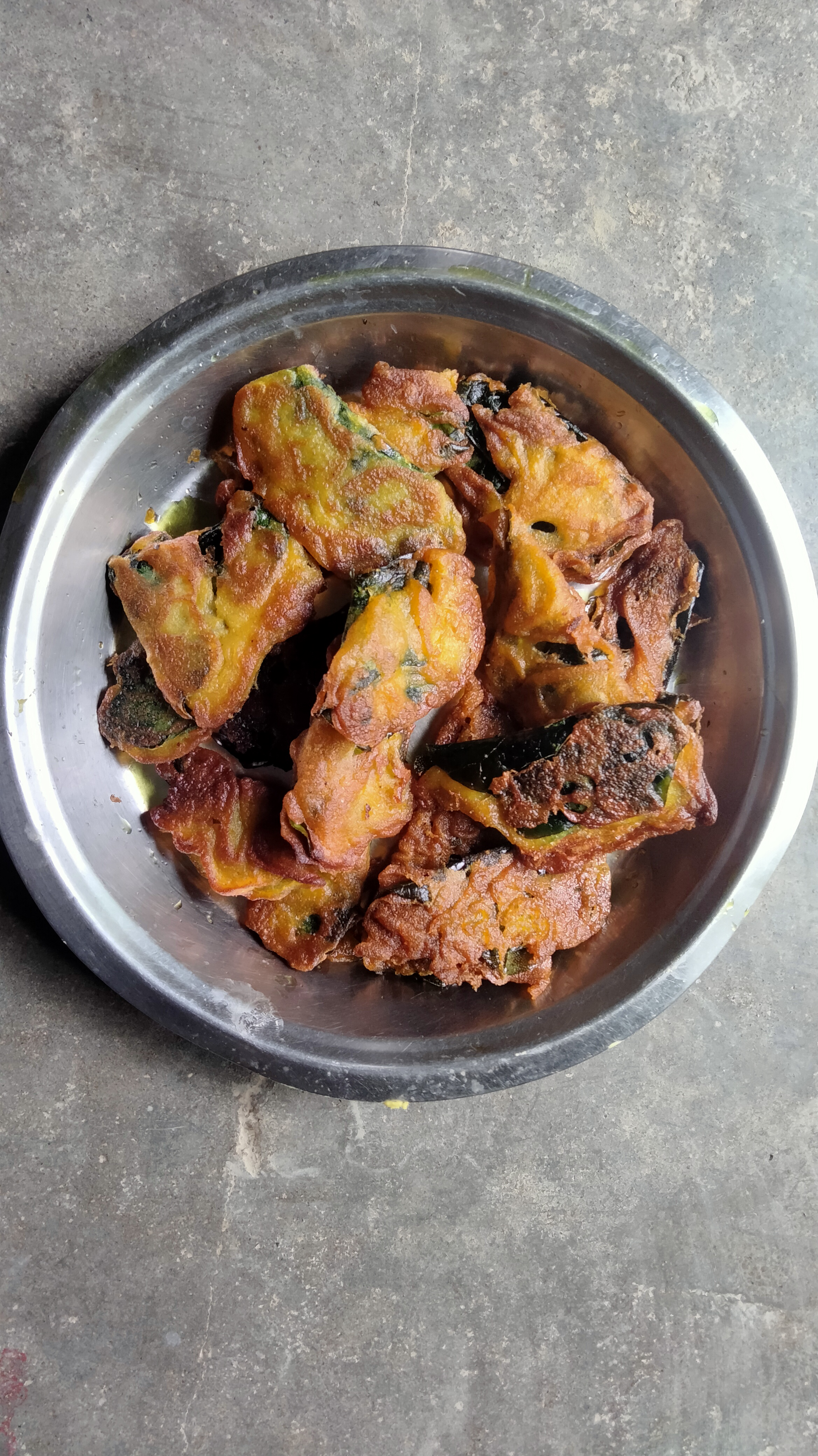
Tilkor tarua

Maithil cuisine and Bhojpuri cuisine are part of Nepalese cuisine. Maithil is a culinary style which originated in Mithila while Bhojpuri cuisine originated in the Bhojpuri region. Some traditional dishes of Madhesh are:

- Curd-flattened rice
- Litti Chokha
- Vegetable of Taro
- Ghugni
- pickles made of fruits and vegetables which are generally mixed with ingredients like salt, spices, and vegetable oils and are set to mature in a moistureless medium.
- Tarua of Coccinia grandis
- Bada
- Badee
- Yogurt
- Irhar
- Pidukia also known as Gujia, which are dumplings
- Foxnut payas
- Anarsa
- Bagiya
- Tilkor Tarua

=== Dances ===
==== Jhijhiya ====
Jhijhiya is a cultural dance from the Mithila region.

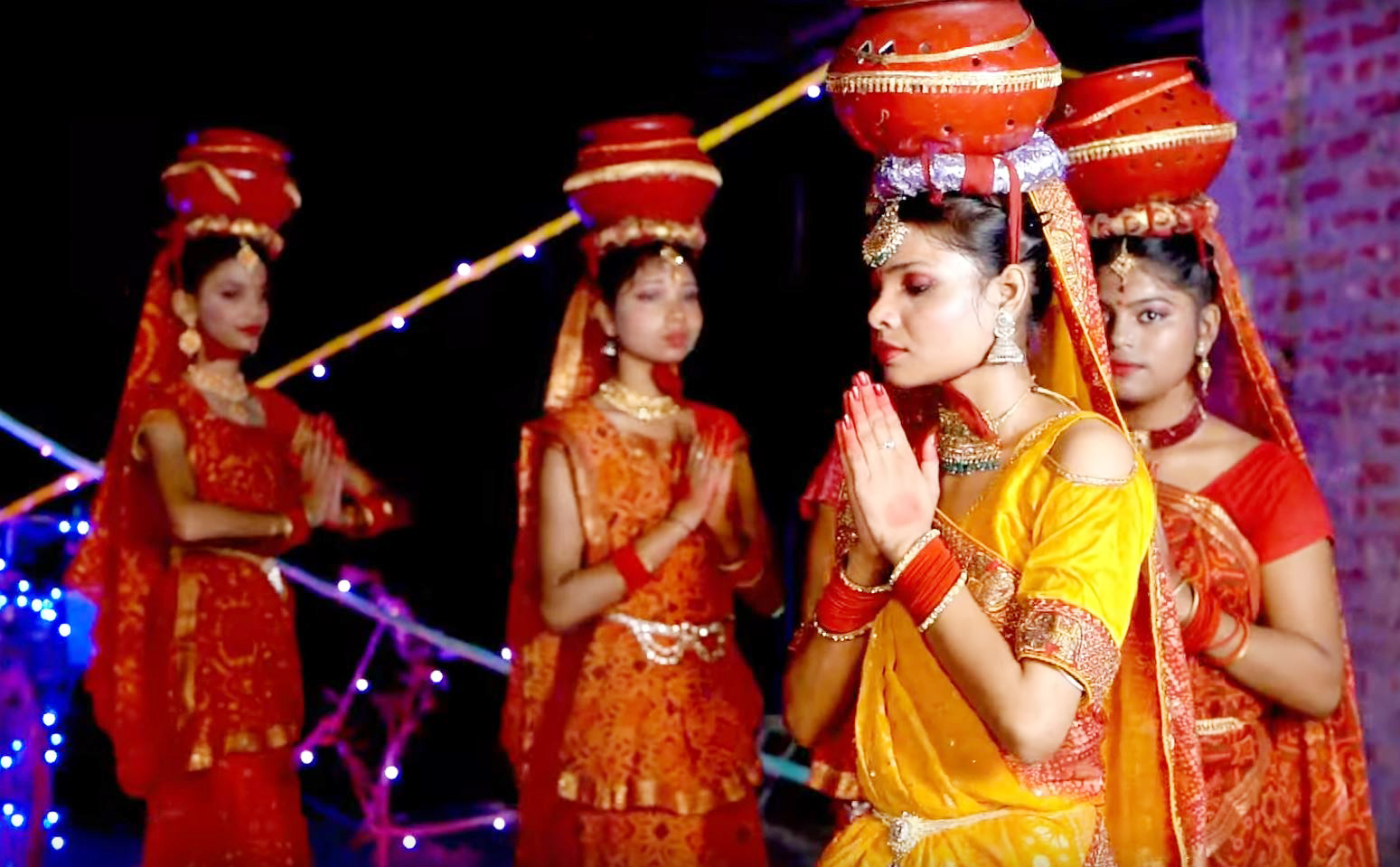
Women performing Jhijhiya dance

Jhijhiya is mostly performed at time of Dusshera, in dedication to Durga Bhairavi, the goddess of victory. While performing jhijhiya, women put lanterns made of clay on their head and they balance it while they dance.

==== Domkach ====
Domkach is a folk dance performed in Mithila and Bhojpur regions of Madhesh Province.

Jat Jatin

Jat Jatin is based on folk songs of Mithila and Tharu community which they perform from Shrawan Purnima to Bhadra Purnima. It is based on the love story of hero jat and heroine Jatin and their lives.

Gauna dance

The Dance is based in Mithila Tradition and popular in Janakpur region of Nepal. This dance is performed in the religious occasions.

== Politics ==
As a political center of the country, Madhesh Province is home to prominent leaders like Ram Baran Yadav, Bimalendra Nidhi and Pradeep Giri from the Nepali Congress, Mahantha Thakur from Loktantrik Samajwadi Party, Nepal, Matrika Yadav from CPN (Maoist Centre) and Dharmanath Prasad Sah, Bansidhar Mishra, Ram Chandra Jha from the CPN (Unified Socialist) who have been ministers at various point of time and are still active at National level. In local level, Nepali congress remains the single largest party.

== Notable people ==
- Ruby Rana, First Miss Nepal, crowned in 1994
- Dr. Ram Baran Yadav, First President of Nepal
- Bimalendra Nidhi, MP and Former deputy prime minister
- Madhav Kumar Nepal, Former Prime minister
- Mahindra Ray Yadav, continues winning Nepalese politician, former minister, present member of parliament
- Upendra Yadav, Former Deputy Prime Minister and Foreign Affairs Minister
- VTEN, Rapper from Rautahat
- Pradeep Giri, Former socialist politician and respected socialist thinker
- Chitra Lekha Yadav, Former education minister, currently ambassador of Nepal in Australia.
- Bina Jaiswal, Nepalese Politician, Rastriya Prajatantra party
- Aashiq Ali Mikrani, martyr of the Terai/Madhesh movement
- Nanyadeva, (1097-1147CE) Founder of Karnat dynasty, Simraungadh-Bara
- Gangadeva, king of simraungadh
- Harisimhadeva, (until 1324CE), Last ruler of karnat Dynasty who fled to Kathmandu valley
- Mahantha Thakur, Veteran Madheshi politician and leader of the Loktantrik Samajwadi Party
- Lalbabu Raut, First Chief Minister of Madhesh Province, representing the People's Socialist Party, Nepal
- Bibek Yadav, Nepalese cricketer who has represented the national team in international matches
- Anil Kumar Shah, A right-handed batsman from Janakpur, Sah has represented Nepal in international cricket and is a key player for the Madhesh Province cricket team
- Deepak Rauniyar, film director Fromm Saptari; he is best known for his movie Rajagunj
- Rabindra Jha, a prominent Nepalese actor, comedian, and scriptwriter, widely recognized for his versatile performances in the Nepali entertainment industry.
- Najir Husen, Actor
- Santosh Shah, a distinguished Nepalese chef renowned for his significant contributions to promoting Nepalese cuisine on the international stage
- Dhirendra Premarshi, Maithili poet and writer

== See also ==
- Mahendra Narayan Nidhi Awas Yojana
- Nepali Congress, Madhesh Province
- Madhesh Province cricket team
