= List of universities in Nepal =

Formal higher learning in Nepal began with the establishment of Tri-Chandra College in 1918, Nepal's first college. Until 1985,Tribhuvan University was its first and only university. The second university to be founded was Nepal Sanskrit University, which was soon followed by Kathmandu University in 1990, and Purbanchal and Pokhara Universities in 1995 and 1996, respectively.

== Types of University ==
=== Federal University ===
Federal universities in Nepal are public institutions established and funded by the central government, operating with a national mandate to provide higher education across various disciplines. There are altogether sixteen federal universities operating in Nepal.

=== Provincial University ===
Provincial universities in Nepal emerged following the promulgation of the 2015 Constitution, which empowered provincial governments to establish higher education institutions tailored to regional development needs, such as technical skills, agriculture, and local governance. These universities receive primary funding from provincial budgets, supplemented by minimal national allocations, enabling them to focus on addressing localized educational gaps amid Nepal's federal restructuring. As of 2025, six provincial universities operate, all founded since 2019, marking a rapid expansion in decentralized higher education; however, operational challenges persist for recently established ones, including limited infrastructure and enrollment. None of these institutions currently hold PhD-granting authority, prioritizing undergraduate and emerging graduate programs instead.

== List of Universities ==
The following table lists the sixteen Federal universities and six Provincial universities as of 2026, including key details verified from official sources:

No.	University	Nepali	Acronym	Established	Location	Province	Constituent Campus	Student Enrollment	Ph.D. granting	Website
FEDERAL UNIVERSITIES
General
1.	Tribhuvan University	त्रिभुवन विश्वविद्यालय	TU	1959	Kathmandu (Kirtipur)	Bagmati	64	322,540	Yes	link
2.	Kathmandu University	काठमाडौँ विश्वविद्यालय	KU	1991	Dhulikhel	Bagmati	9	21000	Yes	link
3.	Purbanchal University	पूर्वाञ्चल विश्वविद्यालय	PU	1993	Sundar Haraicha(Gothgaun)	Koshi	7	30,128	Yes	link
4.	Pokhara University	पोखरा विश्वविद्यालय	PoU	1997	Pokhara	Gandaki	4	35240	Yes	link
5.	Sudurpaschim University	सुदूरपश्चिम विश्वविद्यालय	SPU or FWU	2010	Bhimdatta (Mahendranagar)	Sudurpashchim	15	17268	No	link
6.	Madhyapaschim University	मध्यपश्चिम विश्वविद्यालय	MU	2010	Birendranagar	Karnali	15	13000	Yes	link
7.	Rajarshi Janak University	राजर्षि जनक विश्वविद्यालय	RJU	2017	Janakpur	Madhesh	4	750	No	link
8.	University of Nepal	नेपाल विश्वविद्यालय	UoN	2024	Gaindakot	Gandaki	0	0		link
Off-campus
9.	Nepal Open University	नेपाल खुला विश्वविद्यालय	NOU	2016	Lalitpur	Bagmati	1	593	Yes	link
Agricultural and Foresty
10.	Agriculture and Forestry University	कृषि तथा वन विश्वविद्यालय	AFU	2010	Bharatpur (Rampur)	Bagmati	8	1,978	Yes	link
Science and Technology
11.	Madan Bhandari University of Science and Technology	मदन भण्डारी विज्ञान तथा प्रविधि विश्वविद्यालय	MBUST	2022	Makwanpur (Chitlang)	Bagmati	0	0	Yes	link
Sanskrit
12.	Nepal Sanskrit University	नेपाल संस्कृत विश्वविद्यालय	NSU	1986	Dang (Beljhundi)	Lumbini	14	3,742	Yes	link
Buddhist
13.	Lumbini Buddhist University	लुम्बिनी बौद्ध विश्वविद्यालय	LBU	2004	Rupandehi	Lumbini	3	2050	Yes	link
Medical
14.	Martyr Dasharath Chand University of Health Science	शहीद दशरथ चन्द स्वास्थ्य विज्ञान विश्वविद्यालय	MDCUSH	2026 A.D. (2082 B.S.)	Godawari-05, Geta, Kailali	Sudurpashchim	1	0		link
15.	Yogamaya Ayurveda University	योगमाया आयुर्वेद विश्वविद्यालय	YAU	2025	Arun Valley, Sankhuwasabha	Koshi Province	0	0		link
Defence/Military
16.	National Defense University	राष्ट्रिय रक्षा विश्वविद्यालय	NDU	Proposed	Banepa (Sanga)	Bagmati				link
PROVINCIAL UNIVERSITIES
17.	Manmohan Technical University	मनमोहन प्राविधिक विश्वविद्यालय	MTU	2019	Morang (Budiganga)	Koshi	0	576	No	link
18.	Gandaki University	गण्डकी विश्वविद्यालय	GU	2019	Pokhara	Gandaki			No	link
19.	Madhesh Agricultural University	मधेश कृषि विश्वविद्यालय	MAU	2021	Saptari (Rajbiraj)	Madhesh			No	link
20.	Madhesh University	मधेश विश्वविद्यालय	MU	2022	Birgunj	Madhesh			No	link
21.	Lumbini Technological University	लुम्बिनी प्राविधिक विश्वविद्यालय	LTU	2022	Banke (Khajura)	Lumbini			No	link
22.	Bagmati University	बागमती विश्वविद्यालय	BU	2024	Hetauda	Bagmati			No	link

=== Autonomous Medical Institutes ===
The following table lists the autonomous medical institutes in Nepal as of 2025, including key details verified from official sources:

No.	Institute	Acronym	Established	Location	Province	Constituent Campus	Student Enrollment	Ph.D. granting	Website
FEDERAL AUTONOMOUS MEDICAL INSTITUTES
1.	National Academy of Medical Sciences (Nepali: चिकित्सा विज्ञान राष्ट्रिय प्रतिष्ठान)	NAMS	1993	Kathmandu (Mahaboudha)	Bagmati			No	link
2.	B. P. Koirala Institute of Health Sciences (Nepali: वी.पी. कोइराला स्वास्थ्य विज्ञान प्रतिष्ठान)	BPKIHS	1998	Dharan	Koshi			Yes	link
3.	Patan Academy of Health Sciences (Nepali: पाटन स्वास्थ्य विज्ञान प्रतिष्ठान)	PAHS	2008	Patan	Bagmati			No	link
4.	Nepalese Army Institute of Health Sciences (Nepali: नेपाली सेना स्वास्थ्य विज्ञान प्रतिष्ठान)	NAIHS	2010	Kathmandu	Bagmati			No	link
5.	Karnali Academy of Health Sciences (Nepali: कर्णाली स्वास्थ्य विज्ञान प्रतिष्ठान)	KAHS	2011	Jumla	Karnali			No	link
6.	Pokhara Academy of Health Sciences (Nepali: पोखरा स्वास्थ्य विज्ञान प्रतिष्ठान)	PoAHS	2016	Pokhara	Gandaki			No	link
7.	Rapti Academy of Health Sciences (Nepali: राप्ती स्वास्थ्य विज्ञान प्रतिष्ठान)	RAHS	2017	Ghorahi	Lumbini			No	link
PROVINCIAL AUTONOMOUS MEDICAL INSTITUTES
8.	Madan Bhandari Academy of Health Sciences (Nepali: मदन भण्डारी स्वास्थ्य विज्ञान प्रतिष्ठान)	MBAHS	2018	Hetauda	Bagmati			No	link
9.	Madhesh Institute of Health Sciences (Nepali: मधेस स्वास्थ्य विज्ञान प्रतिष्ठान)	MIHS	2021	Janakpur	Madhesh			No	link

== Universities by province and type ==
The table below is correct as of 20 February 2025.

State	Central universities	Province universities	Deemed universities	Private universities	Total
Koshi Province (list)	2	1	1		4
Madhesh Province (list)	1	2	1		4
Bagmati Province (list)	6	1	4		11
Gandaki Province (list)	2	1	1		4
Lumbini Province (list)	2	1	1		4
Karnali Province (list)	1	0	1		2
Sudurpashchim Province (list)	2	0	0		2
Total	16	6	9		31

== Proposed University ==
- Mountain University of Science and Technology in Jumla District.
- Tilganga Eye University (or simply Eye University) in Tilganga, Kathmandu.
- Pashupati Hindu University in Kathmandu District.
- Karnali Technical University in Surkhet District.
- Khwopa University in Bhaktapur District.

== Rankings of universities ==
=== Webometrics rankings ===
2023 Webometrics Ranking of World Universities for Nepalese universities are listed below.

University	2023 (January edition)				2018 (July edition)				2016 (July edition)				2015 (July edition)			
University	Country university rank	Change in rank from previous year	World rank	Change from previous year	Country university rank	Change in rank from previous year	World rank	Change from previous year	Country university rank	Change in rank from previous year	World rank	Change from previous year	Country university rank	Change in rank from previous year	World rank	Change from previous year
		▲		▲		▼		▼		Steady		▲		Steady		▲
Last Updated according to Webometrics Ranking of World Universities

== Colleges ==
This section is for higher education colleges offering degree courses but which are not universities in their own right.

- Bagiswori College, Bhaktapur

== See also ==
- Education in Nepal
- List of schools in Nepal
- List of colleges in Nepal
- List of forestry colleges in Nepal
- List of engineering colleges in Nepal
- List of medical colleges in Nepal
- University Grants Commission
