= Administrative divisions of Nepal =

The administrative divisions of Nepal (Nepali: नेपालको प्रशासनिक विभाजन, romanized: Nēpālakō praśāsanik vibhājana) are subnational administrative units of Nepal. The first level of country subdivision of Nepal are the provinces. Each province is further subdivided into districts, each district into municipalities and rural municipalities, and each of those municipalities into wards. Before 2015, instead of provinces, Nepal was divided into developmental regions and administrative zones.

Fulfilling the requirement of the new constitution of Nepal in 2015, all old municipalities and villages (which were more than 3900 in number) were restructured into 753 new municipalities and rural municipalities. The former 75 district development committees (DDC) were also replaced by 77 new district coordination committees (DCC) which have much less power than the DDCs. At present there are 6 metropolitan cities, 11 sub-metropolitan cities, 276 municipalities, and 460 rural municipalities.

Federal Government
7 Provinces (e.g. Gandaki)
77 Districts (e.g. Parbat)
6 Metropolitan Cities (e.g. Kathmandu)	11 Sub-Metropolitan Cities (e.g. Dharan)	276 Municipalities (e.g. Lamki Chuha)	460 Rural Municipalities (e.g. Mahashila)

== Provinces ==
7 Provinces of Nepal

Nepal is composed of seven provinces. They are defined by schedule 4 of the new constitution, by grouping together the existing districts. Two districts however are split in two parts, ending up in two different provinces.

Province	Capital	Governor	Chief Minister	Districts	Area	Pop. (2021)	Density (/km^{2})	HDI (2019)	GDP per capita (USD; 2021)	Map
Koshi Province	Biratnagar	Parshuram Khapung	Kedar Karki	14	25,905 km^{2}	4,972,021	192	0.597	1,298	
Madhesh Province	Janakpur	Hari Shankar Mishra	Saroj Kumar Yadav	8	9,661 km^{2}	6,126,288	767	0.538	882	
Bagmati Province	Hetauda	Yadav Chandra Sharma	Shalikram Jamkattel	13	20,300 km^{2}	6,084,042	300	0.673	2,640	
Gandaki Province	Pokhara	Prithvi Man Gurung	Khagraj Adhikari	11	21,504 km^{2}	2,479,745	116	0.631	1,348	
Lumbini Province	Deukhuri	Amik Sherchan	Jokh Bahadur Mahara	12	22,288 km^{2}	5,124,225	230	0.583	1,209	
Karnali Province	Birendranagar	Tilak Pariyar	Yamlal Kandel	10	27,984 km^{2}	1,694,889	61	0.568	1043	
Sudurpashchim Province	Godawari	Ganga Prasad Yadav	Kamal Bahadur Shah	9	19,999.28 km^{2}	2,711,270	136	0.579	1135	
Nepal	Kathmandu	President Ram Chandra Poudel	Prime Mininster Balendra Shah	77	147,641.28 km^{2}	30,192,480	198	0.602	1,372	

== Districts ==
Map of the districts of Nepal

Provinces are further divided into districts, of which there are 77, since 2017. Each of the districts is governed by a District Coordination Committee.

== Municipalities of Nepal ==
=== Urban municipalities ===
Municipalities are places having at least some minimum criteria of population and infrastructure and declared as a municipality by the government. There are 293 municipalities in Nepal.

=== Rural municipalities ===
Rural municipalities (Gaunpalikas) were established in 2017, replacing the village development committees (VDCs). The main purpose of a gaunpalika resembles that of a VDC, but it has more rights on collection of royalty and taxes and has a higher annual budget than the VDC. Several VDCs were usually combined into each new gaupalika. There are 460 gaunpalikas in Nepal.

== See also ==
- Local government in Nepal
- List of mayors of municipalities in Nepal
- List of chairpersons of rural municipalities in Nepal
