= Drona Prakash Rasali =

Drona Prakash Rasaili (Nepali: द्रोण प्रकाश रसाली, born in Humin, Palpa) is a Nepalese Canadian who stood Board First position topping School Leaving Certificate (Nepal) in his high school education, i.e. national board examinations of Nepal, commonly abbreviated as SLC, held in 1972. He is the only person from Dalit communities of Nepal to obtain the most coveted rank in the history of SLC Board Examinations.

== Community leadership ==
He was elected as the Deputy Regional Coordinator for Americas (DRC) in the International Coordinating Council (ICC) of the global organization Non Resident Nepali Association (NRNA) for the period, 2009–2011. He ran and lost the election for the position of Regional Coordinator (RC) for Americas in the NRNA International Coordinating Council (ICC), 2011–2013. He has served as the Advisor to NRN-Canada National Coordinating Council since 2008 as well as the Advisor to the NRNA International Coordinating Council (ICC) for 2011–2013. He contributed significantly to the establishment of the Nepal Open University as one of the four leading task group members through the Open University of Nepal Initiative, a flagship project of Non-Resident Nepali Association. He is the founding vice-president of Canada-Nepal Friendship and Cultural Society in Canada.

== Professional background ==
Drona Rasali served as Provincial Chronic Disease Epidemiologist at the Saskatchewan Ministry of Health from 2005 to 2012 and As of 2012 was the Director, Population Health Surveillance & Epidemiology at the British Columbia Centre for Disease Control (BCCDC), Provincial Health Services Authority (PHSA) of British Columbia. He is veterinarian, with specializations received in health-related sciences including pathology, endocrinology, quantitative genetics, epidemiology and public health. He is a lifetime member of Nepal Veterinary Association and a registered veterinarian of Nepal Veterinary Council in Nepal, and was awarded the distinguished professional designation of a Fellow of American College of Epidemiology (FACE) in 2014, and currently holds the position adjunct professor at the School of Population and Public Health, University of British Columbia. He held the position of adjunct professor of Health Studies at the University of Regina in Canada (2009-2019). He has publications of scientific research to his credits: 1) World review of composite sheep breeds, 2) He played an important role in establishing Nepal Open University.

Drona Rasali served as the chair of Organizing Committee of Canadian Alliance for Regional Risk Factor Surveillance (CARRFS), a national network of public health professionals in Canada for 2020 and 2021.
