= List of Nepalese provinces by Human Development Index =

This is a list of Nepalese provinces by Human Development Index (HDI) as of 2024. Of the seven provinces of Nepal, all are considered to have "medium human development" per the Human Development Index, namely Bagmati, Gandaki, Koshi Pradesh, and Lumbini, Sudurpashchim, Karnali, and Madhesh.

== Provinces (2024) ==
New formed Provinces

This is a list of provinces by Human Development Index according to new formed Provinces of Nepal:

Medium Human Development
Rank	Provinces	HDI (2024)
1	Bagmati	0.652
2	Gandaki	0.641
—	Nepal (average)	0.622
3	Koshi	0.617
4	Lumbini	0.608
5	Sudurpashchim	0.601
6	Karnali	0.590
7	Madhesh	0.561

== Former regions ==
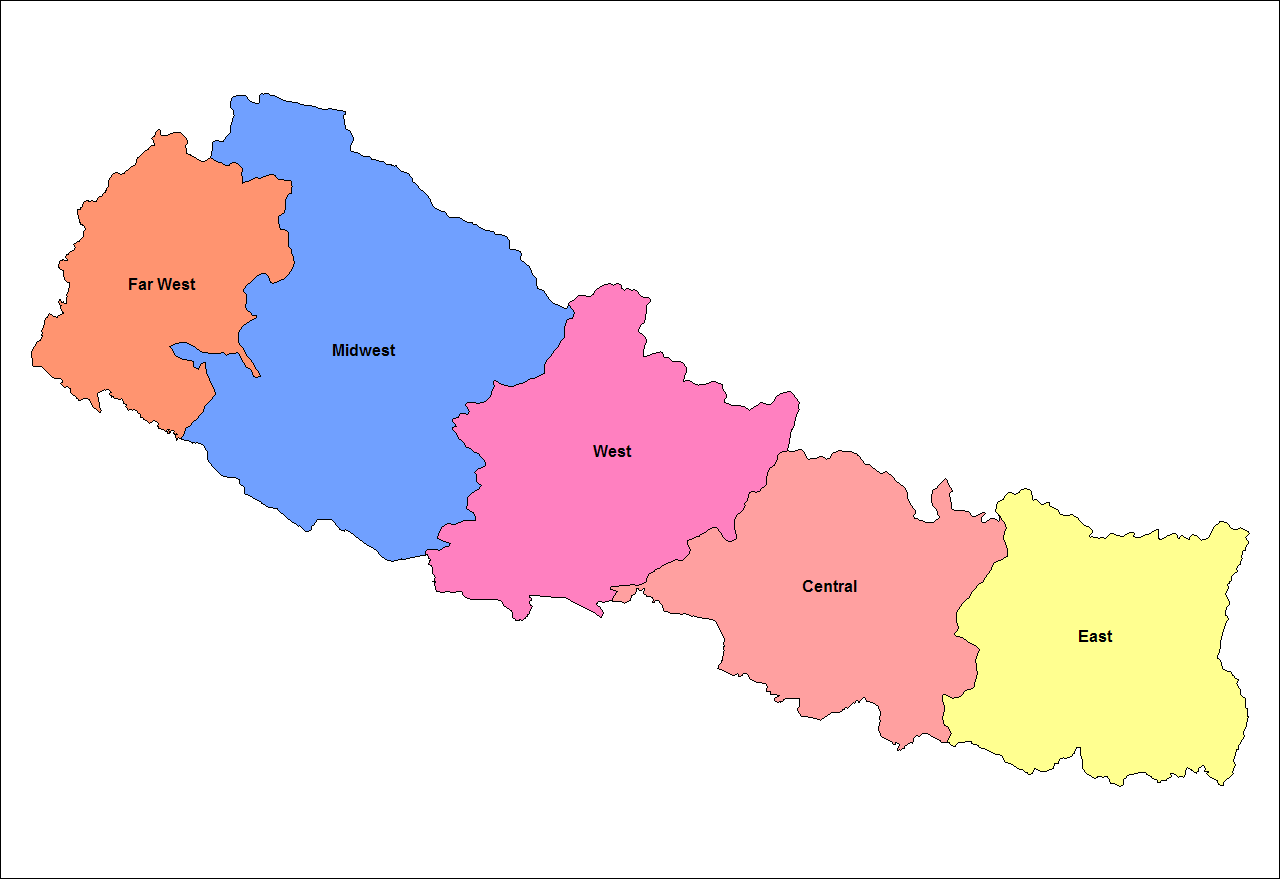
Former development regions of Nepal

This is a list of former development regions of Nepal (until 2015) by Human Development Index as of 2022.

Rank	Region (Zones)	HDI (2022)
Medium Human Development
1	Western (Gandaki, Lumbini, Dhaulagiri)	0.618
2	Central (Janakpur, Bagmati, Narayani)	0.605
–	Nepal (average)	0.602
3	Eastern (Mechi, Kosi, Sagarmatha)	0.598
4	Far-Western (Seti, Mahakali)	0.581
5	Mid-Western (Rapti, Bheri, Karnali)	0.567

== Trends by UNDP reports (International HDI) ==
Human Development Index (by UN Method) of regions in Nepal since 1990.

Region	HDI 1990	HDI 1995	HDI 2000	HDI 2005	HDI 2010	HDI 2015	HDI 2020
Central	0.382	0.413	0.442	0.483	0.529	0.571	0.595
Eastern	0.406	0.440	0.459	0.477	0.538	0.569	0.589
Far-Western	0.352	0.382	0.414	0.444	0.493	0.542	0.578
Mid-Western	0.338	0.366	0.421	0.450	0.499	0.541	0.567
Western	0.389	0.421	0.465	0.488	0.543	0.589	0.618
Nepal	0.379	0.411	0.446	0.474	0.528	0.568	0.592

== See also ==
- List of Nepalese provinces by Population
- List of Nepalese provinces by GDP
- List of countries by HDI
- Administrative divisions of Nepal
