= University of Nepal =

Public university in Gaidakot, Gandaki Province, Nepal

- नेपाल विश्वविद्यालय
- Motto: उज्यालो भविष्यका लागि शिक्षालाई आकार दिँदै…
- Motto in English: Shaping education for a brighter future…
- Type: Public university
- Established: 2024 (2 years ago)
- Chancellor: Dr. Bindu Nath Lohani
- Vice-Chancellor: Dr. Arjun Karki
- Location: [Kathmandu], Bagmati, Nepal; 27.717969°N 85.324386°E
- Website: unepal.edu.np

The University of Nepal (UoN) (Nepali: नेपाल विश्वविद्यालय) is a public university established by the University of Nepal Act 2024. According to the university, it plans to operate as a research focused institution with autonomy over its academic and administrative decisions. It became Nepal’s 14th university after presidential certification of the University of Nepal Act 2081 on Ashoj 23.

The university's official mission statement says reducing the number of Nepali students studying abroad is one of its objectives. The Human Resource Management (HRM) of Nepal reports that its proposal includes a governance model intended to limit political involvement. In addition, the university's proposal describes plans to establish itself as a institution for education and research with both national and international academic engagement. Additionally, UoN will be run by an independent Board of Trustees who will be responsible for appointing senior leadership positions (such as selecting its own vice-chancellor). The main administrative headquarters of the university will be set outside the Kathmandu Valley.

== History ==
The University of Nepal Act, 2081 (2024) proposed the university in October 2024. UoN began existence 31 days post the law's passage as an institution focused on higher education and research, according to Nepal Law Commission. The concept of the university originated in the late 2010s to address challenges facing Nepal's higher education sector. Since then, some 40 Nepali academicians have been working to establish the University of Nepal to address the issue. The House of Representatives passed the University of Nepal bill on Bhadra 24, following a proposal by Education Minister Vidya Bhattari. The bill also underwent review in the Parliamentary Committee on Health and Information Technology and was passed in the National Assembly on Ashad 18. According to the HRM Nepal, existing universities in Nepal face challenges related to politicization, government control and concerns about teaching quality and the University of Nepal was proposed as an initiative to operate under a different governance model.

== Governance structure ==
ToN operates under a governance structure managed by an independent Board of Trustees, chaired by the Chancellor and includes representatives from the university administration, provincial and local governments, academic sectors, and five contributing members. The Human Resource Management of Nepal reports that the university's governance structure is written to limit political and politicians' involvement in the administration of the school.

Under the Board of Trustees are the Academic Council, the Executive Council, and various research centers, along with schools and constituent colleges. The core leadership positions include the Chancellor, Vice-Chancellor, Registrar, Deans, Directors, and campus Principals. One report states that Dr. Arjun Karki currently serves as Vice-Chancellor.

The structure is as follows:

- Board of Trustees
- Academic Council
- Executive Council
- Research Centers
- Schools and colleges
- Chancellor
- Vice-Chancellor - Dr Arjun Karki
- Registrar
- Dean
- Director
- Principal

== Members of the Board of Trustees ==
- Dr. Bindu N. Lohani (Chancellor)
- Dr. Bimala Rai Paudyal
- Prof. Bipin Adhikari
- Ms. Chandni Joshi
- Dr. Jagadish C. Pokharel
- Er. Lal Krishna K C
- Ms. Laxmi Devi Pandey
- Mr. Madhab Paudel
- Mr. Rameshore Khanal
- Prof. Dr. Ram M. Shrestha
- Dr. Shiba Thapa

The board of Trustees will be chaired by the Chancellor and include representatives from the university leadership, provincial and local governments, academics, and five contributing members (two of which are women).

== See also ==
- List of universities in Nepal
