= List of Nepalese provinces by population =

State of Nepal by population

The list of seven provinces of Nepal by population (2021 census).

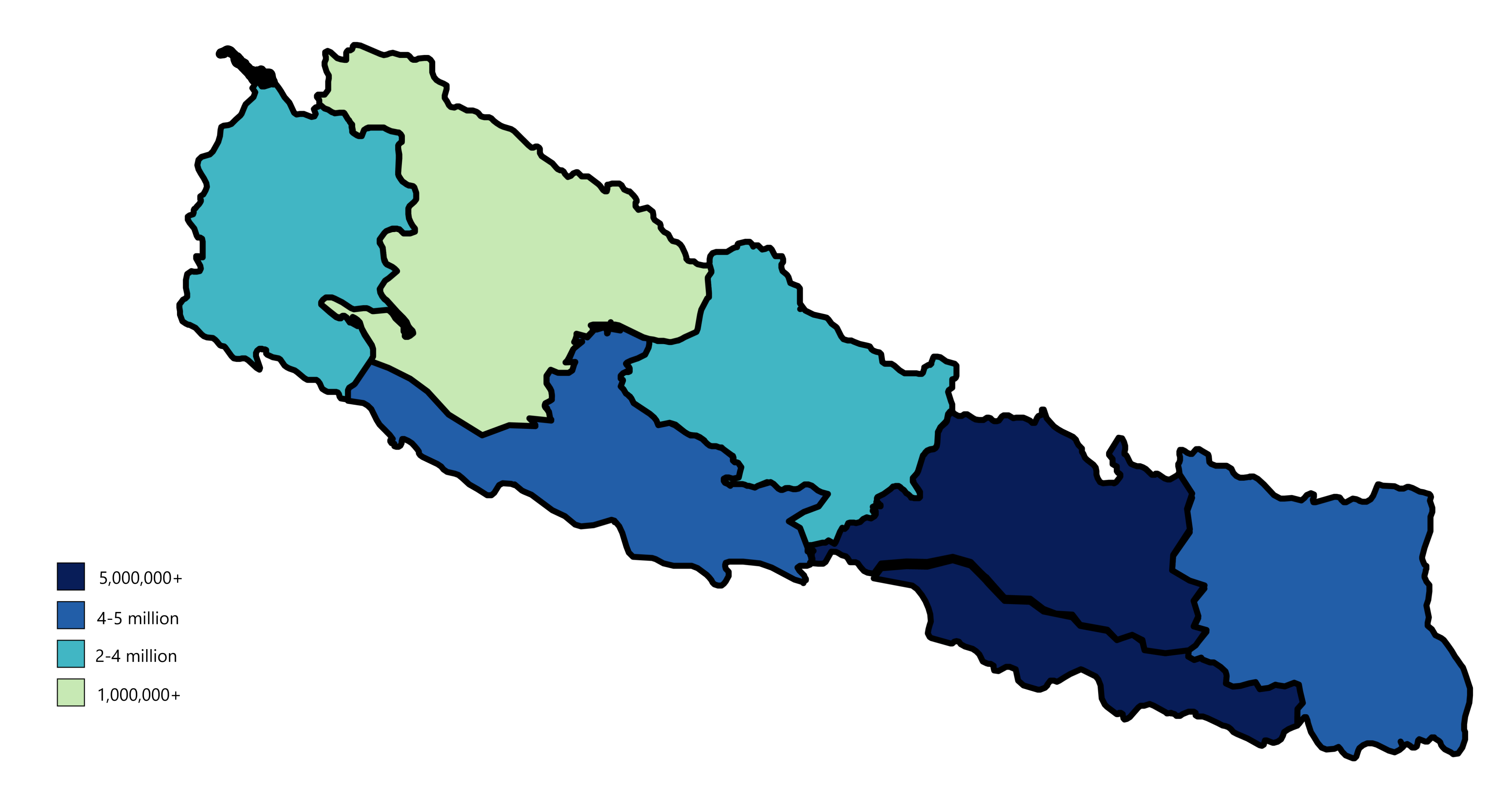
Province	Population (2021)	Density (people/km^{2})	Percentage of total	Map
Bagmati Province	6,116,866	301	20.97%	
Madhesh Province	6,114,600	633	20.97%	
Lumbini Province	5,122,078	230	17.56%	
Koshi Province	4,961,412	192	17.01%	
Sudurpashchim Province	2,694,783	138	9.24%	
Gandaki Province	2,466,427	115	8.46%	
Karnali Province	1,688,412	60	5.79%	
Nepal	29,164,578	198	100%	

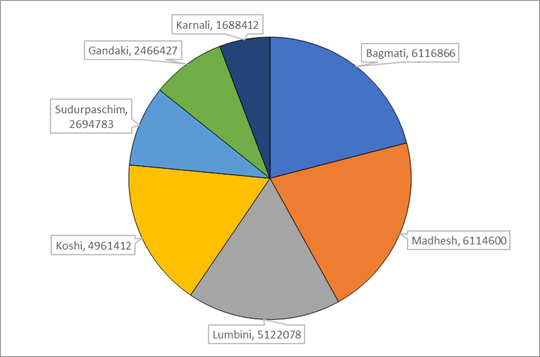
Population distribution in Nepal by Provinces (Source: Census, 2021)

== See also ==
- List of Nepalese provinces by GDP
- List of Nepalese provinces by HDI
- Administrative divisions of Nepal
