= Humin (disambiguation) =

Did you mean: Human?

Humin may refer to:

- Humin, a compound of soil
- Humin, Palpa, in Nepal
- Humin, Poland
