= Provinces of Nepal =

- Category: Federated state
- Location: Federal Democratic Republic of Nepal
- Created: 20 September 2015
- Number: 7 provinces
- Populations: Lowest: Karnali (1,694,889); Highest: Bagmati (6,116,866)
- Areas: Smallest: Madhesh, 9,661 km^{2} (3,730 sq mi); Largest: Karnali, 27,984 km^{2} (10,805 sq mi)
- Densities: Smallest: Karnali (60 per sq. km); Largest: Madhesh (633 per sq. km)
- Government: Provincial government
- Subdivisions: Districts

Nepal is a federal union of seven provinces. The Provinces of Nepal were formed on 20 September 2015 in accordance with Schedule 4 of the Constitution of Nepal. The seven provinces were formed by grouping the existing districts. The current system of seven provinces replaced an earlier system where Nepal was divided into 14 administrative zones which were grouped into five development regions.

== History ==
A committee was formed to restructure administrative divisions of Nepal on 23 December 1956 and in two weeks, a report was submitted to the government. In accordance with The Report On Reconstruction Of Districts Of Nepal, 2013 (Nepali: नेपालको जिल्ला प्रशासन पुनर्गठनको रिपोर्ट, २०१३, romanized: Nepalko Jilla Prashasan Punargathanko Report, 2013), the country was first divided into seven Kshetras (areas).

1. Arun Kshetra
2. Janakpur Kshetra
3. Kathmandu Kshetra
4. Gandaki Kshetra
5. Kapilavastu Kshetra
6. Karnali Kshetra
7. Mahakali Kshetra

In 1962, all Kshetras were dissolved and the country was restructured into 75 development districts; those districts were further grouped into 14 zones. In 1972, all 14 zones were grouped into 4 development regions; later in 1981, they were rearranged into the following 5 development regions.

1. Eastern Development Region
2. Central Development Region
3. Western Development Region
4. Mid-Western Development Region
5. Far-Western Development Region

The provinces of Nepal were formed according to Schedule 4 of the Constitution of Nepal. The seven provinces were formed by grouping the existing districts; two districts, namely Nawalparasi and Rukum, were split between two provinces. Each district has local units. Local level bodies in Nepal include six metropolises, 11 sub-metropolises, 276 municipal councils and 460 village councils. The current system of seven provinces replaced an earlier system where Nepal was divided into 14 administrative zones which were grouped into five development regions.

In January 2016 the Government of Nepal announced temporary headquarters of the seven provinces. According to Article 295 (2), the permanent names of the provinces will be determined by a two-thirds vote of the respective province's legislature.

=== Government ===
The executive power of the provinces, pursuant to the constitution and laws, is vested in the council of ministers of the province. The executive power of the province shall be exercised by the province head (governor) in case of absence of the province executive in a state of emergency or enforcement of the federal rule. Every province has a ceremonial head as the representative of the federal government. The President appoints a governor for every province. The governor exercises the rights and duties as to be performed specified in the constitution or laws. The governor appoints the leader of the parliamentary party with the majority in the provincial assembly as the chief minister and the council of ministers are formed under the chairpersonship of the chief minister.

=== Assemblies ===
The Pradesh Sabha is the unicameral legislative assembly of each of the seven federal provinces. The term for the members of the provincial assemblies is five years, except when dissolved earlier.

Candidates for each constituency are chosen by the political parties or stand as independents. Each constituency elects one member under the first past the post system of election. Since Nepal uses a parallel voting system, voters cast another ballot to elect members through the party-list proportional representation. The current constitution specifies that sixty percent of the members should be elected by the first past the post system and forty percent through the party-list proportional representation system. Women should account for one-third of total members elected from each party and if one-third percentage are not elected, the party that fails to ensure so shall have to elect one-third of total number as women through the party-list proportional representation.

A party with an overall majority (more seats than all other parties combined) following an election forms the government. If a party has no outright majority, parties can seek to form coalitions.

== List of provinces of Nepal ==
Province	ISO	Capital	Governor	Chief Minister	Districts	Area	Pop. (2021)	Density (/km^{2})	Reps.	Map
Koshi	NP-P1	Biratnagar	Parshuram Khapung	Hikmat Kumar Karki	Taplejung; Panchthar; Ilam; Jhapa; Tehrathum; Sankhuwasabha; Dhankuta; Morang; Sunsari; Bhojpur; Udayapur; Khotang; Solukhumbu; Okhaldhunga; (Total 14)	25,905 km^{2}	4,961,412	192	28	
Madhesh	NP-P2	Janakpur	Surendra Labh Karn	Krishna Prasad Yadav	Saptari; Siraha; Dhanusha; Mahottari; Sarlahi; Rautahat; Bara; Parsa; (Total 8)	9,661 km^{2}	6,114,600	633	32	
Bagmati	NP-P3	Hetauda	Deepak Prasad Devkota	Indra Bahadur Baniya	Dolakha; Ramechhap; Sindhuli; Sindhupalchowk; Kavrepalanchok; Kathmandu; Lalitpur; Bhaktapur; Rasuwa; Nuwakot; Makawanpur; Dhading; Chitwan; (Total 13)	20,300 km^{2}	6,116,866	301	33	
Gandaki	NP-P4	Pokhara	Dilli Raj Bhatta	Surendra Raj Pandey	Gorkha; Lamjung; Tanahun; Nawalpur; Manang; Mustang; Kaski; Parbat; Syangja; Myagdi; Baglung; (Total 11)	21,504 km^{2}	2,466,427	115	18	
Lumbini	NP-P5	Deukhuri	Krishna Bahadur Gharti	Chet Narayan Acharya	Parasi; Palpa; Gulmi; Arghakhanchi; Rupandehi; Kapilvastu; Pyuthan; Eastern Rukum; Rolpa; Dang; Banke; Bardiya; (Total 12)	22,288 km^{2}	5,122,078	230	26	
Karnali	NP-P6	Birendranagar	Yagya Raj Joshi	Yam Lal Kandel	Dolpa; Mugu; Humla; Jumla; Western Rukum; Jajarkot; Kalikot; Dailekh; Surkhet; Salyan; (Total 10)	27,984 km^{2}	1,688,412	60	12	
Sudurpashchim	NP-P7	Godawari	Najir Miya	Kamal Bahadur Shah	Bajura; Achham; Bajhang; Darchula; Baitadi; Dadeldhura; Doti; Kanchanpur; Kailali; (Total 9)	19,999.28 km^{2}	2,694,783	138	16	
Nepal	NP	Kathmandu	President Ram Chandra Poudel	Prime Minister Balen Shah	77	147,641.28 km^{2}	29,164,578	198	165	

== See also ==
- Administrative divisions of Nepal
- List of districts of Nepal
- List of Nepalese provinces by GDP
- List of Nepalese provinces by HDI
- List of Nepalese provinces by population
