= List of capitals in Nepal =

This is a list of capital cities of Nepal and its current and former provinces, and territories.

== National capital ==
| Capital | Province | Status | Ref(s) |
|---|---|---|---|
| Kathmandu | Bagmati Province | Metropolitan city | |
| Gorkha | Gandaki Province | Former capital | |

== Sub-national capitals ==
=== Current provincial capitals ===
| Capital | Province | Status | Ref(s) |
|---|---|---|---|
| Biratnagar | Koshi Province | Metropolitan city | |
| Janakpur | Madhesh Province | Sub-metropolitan city | |
| Hetauda | Bagmati Province | Sub-metropolitan city | |
| Pokhara | Gandaki Province | Metropolitan city | |
| Deukhuri | Lumbini Province | Planned city | |
| Birendranagar | Karnali Province | Municipality | |
| Godawari | Sudurpashchim Province | Municipality | |

=== Former provincial capitals ===
| Capital | Province | Status | Ref(s) |
|---|---|---|---|
| Butwal | Lumbini Province | Sub-metropolitan city | |
| Dhangadhi | Sudurpashchim Province | Sub-metropolitan city | |
