= Nepal Veterinary Association =

Nepal Veterinary Association (NVA) was established in June 1967 and was legally registered in February 1969. The Association is affiliated as a member of World Veterinary Association (WVA) since 1998. It is a body of Nepalese veterinarians who hold, at least, a bachelor's degree in Veterinary Science. There is also provision for foreign veterinarian who want to work in Nepal and who are eligible to register as veterinarians in Nepal in accordance with the prescribed rules and regulations. Until now about 655 veterinarians including 40 foreign nationals have been registered as member of the Association.

The Nepal Veterinary Association elected new committee under the leadership of Dr. Sital Kaji Shrestha through their 12th National Convention held in Kathmandu from 1–3 June 2016. A 16-member committee headed by Dr. Sital Kaji Shrestha includes Dr. Nirmal Katuwal as vice president, Dr. Rajendra Prasad Yadav as General Secretary, Dr. Tapendra Prasad Bohara as Secretary, Dr. Sudeep Keshav Humagain as a Treasurer, Dr. Neena Amatya Gorkhali as a chief editor. Central Members included Dr. Sulochana Shrestha, Dr. Binod Sanjel, Dr. Binod Yadav, Dr. Sikesh Manandhar, Dr. Suraj Thapa. Regional Coordinator representing the board includes Dr. Sanjay Yadav, Dr. Sita Rijal, Dr. Kishor Acharya, Dr. Shankar Pandey and Dr. Madan Singh Dhami.

The Nepal Veterinary Association has members with wide range of expertise in animal health and production, public health and natural resource management enabling the association fully capable for providing competent consultancy service in these areas. The association is committed to welfare of all Nepali veterinarians and provides services to Government of Nepal as well as the public and private sectors. The Nepalese Vet Journal and Vet Chaumasik are regular publications of this Association.
