= Bagiswori College =

Community college in Nepal

Coordinates: 27.67523°N 85.43920°E

- Type: Community, Non-profit
- Established: 2064 BS
- Affiliations: Tribhuvan University
- Principal: Dhan Kumar Shrestha
- Location: Tumacho, Kamalbinayak, Bhaktapur, Nepal
- Website: bagisworicollege.edu.np

Bagiswori College is a community college located in Bhaktapur, Nepal, established in 2064 BS (2007 CE).

Bagiswori College runs Bachelor Programs under two different streams BA and BBS and two Master Programs MBS and MA (Sociology) in affiliation with Tribhuvan University.

== Programs ==
The bachelor's degree programs are:

- BBS (Bachelor of Business Studies) (Morning)
- BA (Bachelor of Arts) (Morning)

The master's degree programs are:

- MBS ( Master of Business Studies) (Morning/Evening)
- MA Sociology ( Master in Sociology ) (Morning)
