= Madan Bhandari University of Science and Technology =

Research university in Chitlang, Nepal

- मदन भण्डारी विज्ञान तथा प्रविधि विश्वविद्यालय
- Type: Public research university
- Established: August 3, 2022 (3 years ago)
- President: Dr. Rajendra Dhoj Joshi
- Location: Chitlang, Bagmati, Nepal
- Campus: 250 hectares (620 acres)
- Website: www.mbust.edu.np

Madan Bhandari University of Science and Technology (MBUST; Nepali: मदन भण्डारी विज्ञान तथा प्रविधि विश्वविद्यालय) is a public research university located in Chitlang, Makwanpur, Nepal. With the aim to develop world-class human resources in scientific, engineering, and technological disciplines to drive Nepal's economic competitiveness it was founded in 2022.
