= Madhesh Agricultural University =

Public university in Rajbiraj, Nepal

- मधेश कृषि विश्वविद्यालय (Nepali)
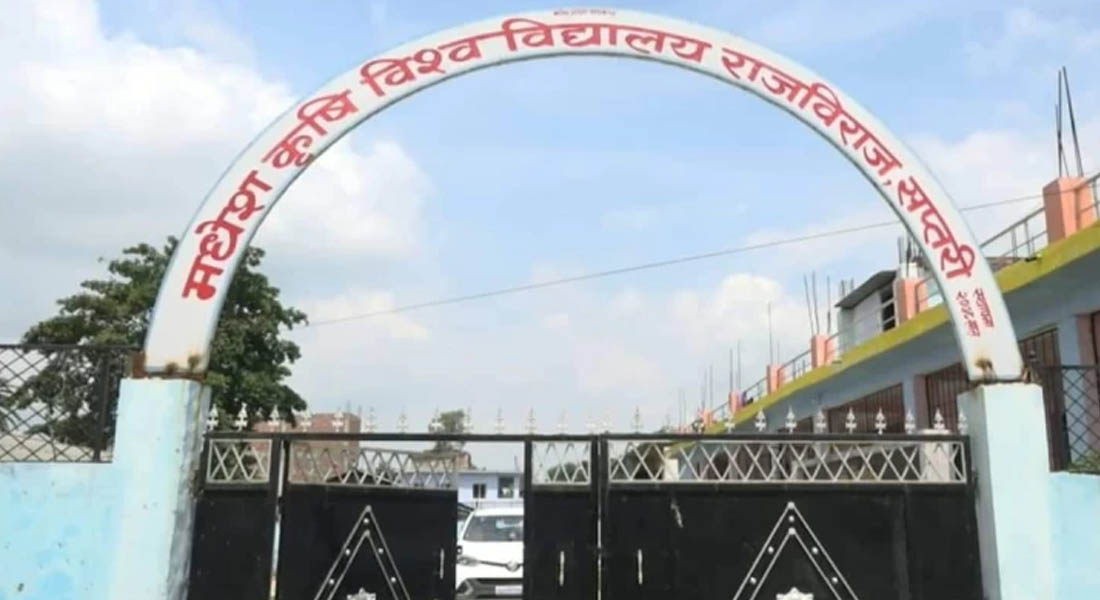
- The entrance gate of the university
- Type: Public
- Established: 13 December 2021; 4 years ago
- Chancellor: Krishna Prasad Yadav (Chief Minister of Madhesh Province)
- Vice-Chancellor: Dr. Baidyanath Mahato
- Dean: Shree Bhagwan Thakur (Registrar)
- Academic staff: 40 (As of 2026)
- Students: 150 (As of 2026)
- Location: Near Kaltudas Pokhari, Rajbiraj, Madhesh Province, 56400, Nepal; 26.5359399°N 86.7516932°E
- Campus: Urban
- Website: mau.edu.np

Madhesh Agricultural University (MAU) is a public university in Rajbiraj, Saptari, Nepal. The university is affiliated with the Ministry of Education of Madhesh Province. It was the first agricultural university of Madhesh Province. The university project has been listed as the Province Pride Projects of Madhesh and established by the ordinance of the Government of Madhesh Province on November 9, 2021.

As of August 2026, MAU offers only one undergraduate course and plans to add more courses in the next academic year.

== Organisation and administration ==
=== Governance ===
The chancellor of Madhesh Agricultural University is the chief minister of Madhesh Province. The university's vice-chancellor is Dr. Baidyanath Mahato and the registrar is Shree Bhagwan Thakur.

=== Academics ===
As of August 2026, The university offers only one undergraduate degree of Bachelor of Agriculture (Hons.). The university is planning to add three more faculties, Veterinary & Animal Sciences, Fisheries, and Food Science, from the next academic calendar year.

== Collaboration ==
The university has signed an agreement with Dr. Rajendra Prasad Central Agriculture University, Bihar, India for the exchange of knowledge, experience, skills, and mutual support.
