= Nepal Open University =

Public university in Nepal

- नेपाल खुला विश्वविद्यालय
- Type: Distance Public university
- Established: 2016 (10 years ago)
- Chancellor: Prime Minister of Nepal
- Vice-Chancellor: Prof. Dr. Shilu Bajracharya
- Students: 3,000+ (2024)
- Location: Lalitpur, Bagmati, Nepal; 27.666563°N 85.318823°E
- Campus: Online
- Website: nou.edu.np

Nepal Open University (Nepali: नेपाल खुला विश्वविद्यालय) is a distance learning public university in Nepal. It was established in 2016 through an act of Parliament. The degrees awarded by the university are treated as equivalent to degrees awarded by any other Nepali University under the purview of the University Grants Commission.

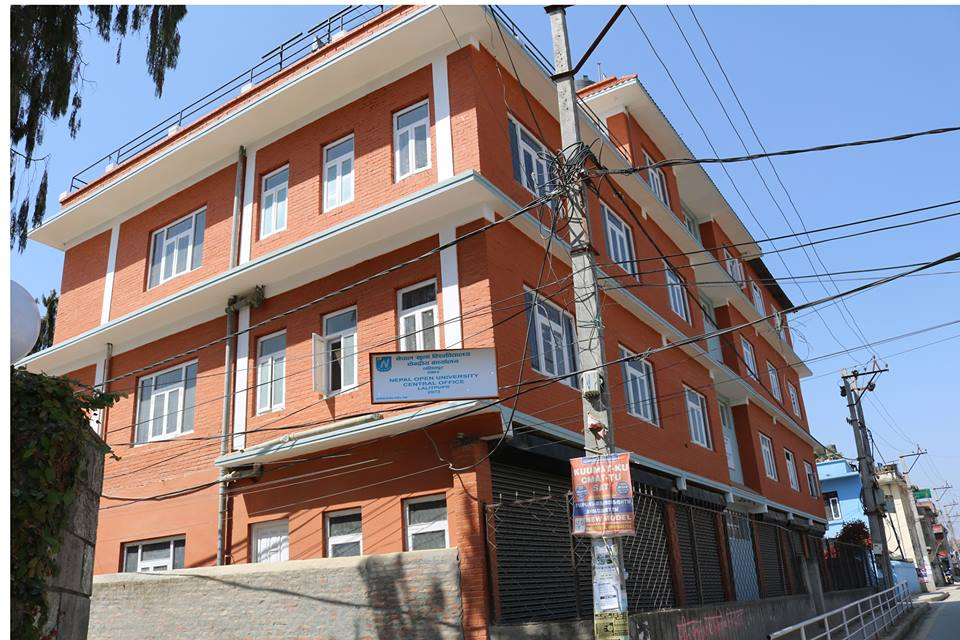
NOU Building

== History of Establishment ==
The initial formal endeavor of establishing an Open University in Nepal can be traced to 1999, when the government became a signatory of South Asian Association for Regional Cooperation Consortium to Open and Distance Education. The budget speech of Fiscal Year 2008/09 allocated funding to implement Open University concept in order to provide an opportunity to youths who were deprived of getting education during the conflict period. However, the government did not take any concrete action due to the lack of a proper institutional body to initiate implementation of the plan.

Meanwhile, a Canada-based non-profit organization, Canada Forum for Nepal (CFFN) involved in delivering education to the people living in the economically deprived regions of Nepal since 2007, brought together three North American Nepali Diaspora leaders Dr. Ambika P. Adhikari, Dr. Drona Prakash Rasali and Dr. Pramod Dhakal and an Australian Nepali Diaspora leader Dr. Raju Adhikari to initiate the issue of establishing Open University in Nepal as one of the prime agenda for the Non-Resident Nepali Association (NRNA)'s International Coordination Council (ICC), which endorsed the Open University of Nepal (OUN) initiative as its flagship project in 2010.

In two instances, the legislative bills for OUN were tabled in the Parliament. The first one was aborted due to dissolution of the Parliament in May 2012. The second bill was passed by the Parliament on June 30, 2016. and authenticated by the President of Nepal on July 14, 2016.

== Administration ==
- Chancellor – Ashok Kumar Rai, Minister of Education, Science and Technology
- Vice-Chancellor – Shilu Manandhar Bajracharya, PhD
- Registrar – Govinda Singh Bista
- Faculty Deans
  - Faculty of Science, Health & Technology – Surendra Shrestha
  - Faculty of Social Sciences & Education – Khagendra Prasai
  - Faculty of Management & Law – Arhan Sthapit

=== Chancellor ===
The Chancellor is the Head of the university and presides at the convocation of the university. The Minister of Education, Science and Technology serves as Chancellor in an ex-officio capacity.

=== Vice-Chancellor ===
The Vice-Chancellor is the executive head of the university.

=== Registrar ===
The Registrar is the financial and administrative head of the university.

== Faculties ==
The university consists of three Faculties which offers 16 academic programs comprising courses at Diploma, Bachelor's, Master's and MPhil levels.

=== Faculty of Management and Law ===
- Bachelor of Laws
- Bachelor of Business Sciences
- Master of Business Administration
- Master of Science in Development Management and Governance

=== Faculty of Science, Health and Technology ===
- Master's Degree in e-Governance
- Master's Degree in Natural Resource and Development
- Master's Degree in Geoinformatics
- Masters of Science in Environmental and Occupational Health
- MPhil in ICT

=== Faculty of Social Sciences and Education ===
- Master's Degree in Media and Communication Studies
- Diploma in Library and Information Management

== Notable alumni ==
- Gyanendra Singh Mahata, Member of Parliament (2026-present), Rastriya Swatantra Party
