= Deukhuri =

Capital of Lumbini Pradesh, Federal Democratic Republic of Nepal

Deukhuri देउखुरी
- Capital of Lumbini Province
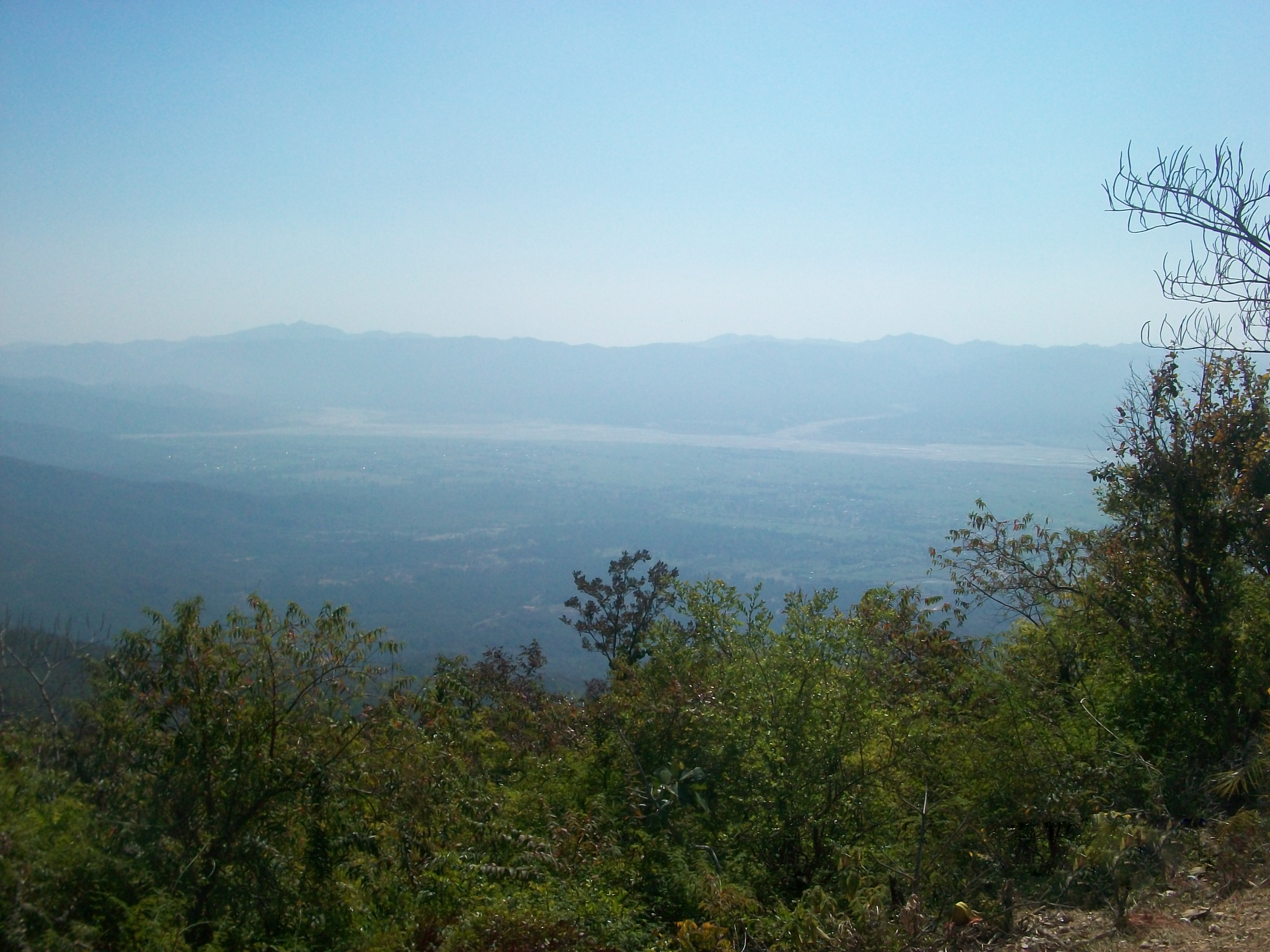

- Location of Deukhuri in the Province Deukhuri (Nepal)
- Coordinates: 27°50′32.2″N 82°45′41.9″E
- Country: Nepal
- Province: Lumbini
- District: Dang
- Elevation: 88–405 m (289–1,329 ft)
- Time zone: UTC+5:45 (CST)

Deukhuri (Nepali: देउखुरी), also known as Deukhuri Valley, is a proposed permanent capital of Lumbini Province in Nepal which was decided on 20th of Aswin 2077 BS (October 6, 2020 AD). The temporary capital of Lumbini is in Butwal (Rupandehi District).

The Dekhuri territory will be formed in the inner terai part of Dang Valley. The capital city will be formed by combining Rapti Rural Municipality, Gadhawa Rural Municipality and Sitaganga Municipality. The three local level unit currently lies in two different district, i.e. Dang and Arghakhanchi District. The planned city is located on the bank of Rapti River. and arjun khola

== Geography ==
The Deukhuri Valley (Nepali: देउखुरी उपत्यका) is southeast of the Dang Valley and extends about 60 km (37 mi) in WNW-ESE direction with a maximum width of 20 km (12 mi). It forms a nearly 600 km^{2} (230 sq mi) plain within a drainage basin of 6,100 km^{2} (2,400 sq mi). The valley is drained by the West Rapti River. It emerges from its gorge through the Mahabharat Range and flows WNW along the axis of the Siwalik Range between the Dundwa Range along the India border and the Dang subrange to the north. It flows 100 km (62 mi) in this direction until the Dundwas fall away near Banke, and the river can resume flowing SE toward the Ganges.

The Mahendra Highway passes through the Deukhuri Valley. Valley is settled by Tharu people, and used as winter pasture by Kham Magar from the hills.

== See also ==
- Deukhuri International Cricket Stadium
