= List of Nepalese provinces by GDP =

List of Nepalese provinces by gross domestic product

This is a list of provinces of Nepal by gross domestic product (GDP) and GDP per capita. GDP figures are based on 2026 estimates.

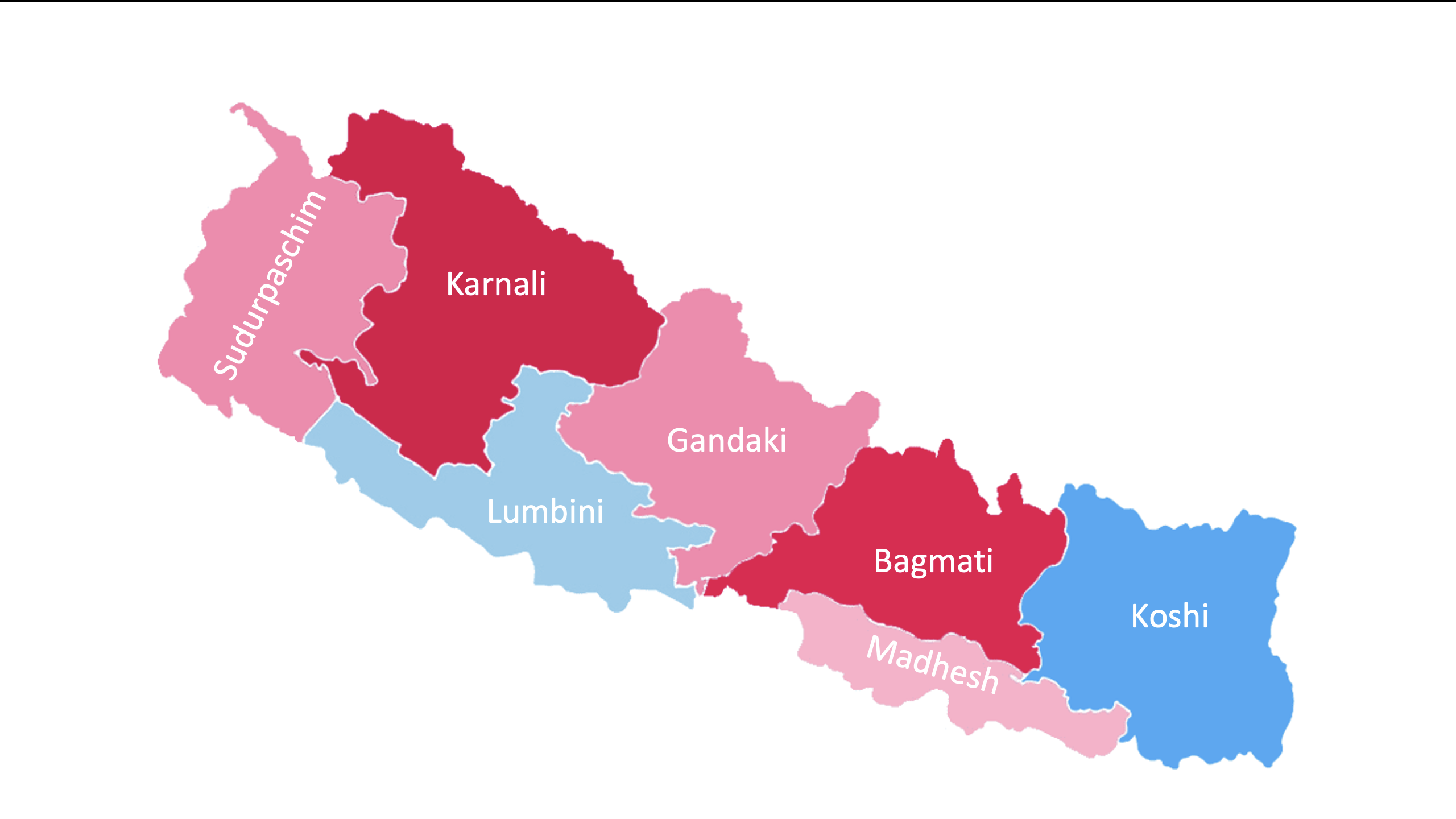
Map of the provinces of Nepal

== Provinces by GDP ==
Rank	Province	2026 GDP (billion USD, nominal)	2026 GDP (billion NPR, nominal)
1	Bagmati	23.45	3,622.56
2	Koshi	7.61	1,175.59
3	Lumbini	7.52	1,161.69
4	Madhesh	6.35	980.95
5	Gandaki	4.43	684.35
6	Sudurpashchim	3.41	526.78
7	Karnali	2.35	363.03
	Nepal	49.112	7.597 Trillion

Note: NPR conversions use an exchange rate of NPR 154.48 per US dollar on 10 October 2026.

== Provinces by GDP per capita ==
Rank	Province	2026 GDP per capita (USD, nominal)
1	Bagmati	2,809
2	Gandaki	1,748
3	Koshi	1,512
4	Lumbini	1,296
5	Sudurpashchim	1,245
6	Karnali	1,176
7	Madhesh	1,006
	Nepal	1,658

== See also ==
- Economy of Nepal
- Provinces of Nepal
- List of countries by GDP (nominal)
- List of countries by GDP (nominal) per capita
