= Bagmati Province =

Province in central Nepal

Bagmati Province बागमती प्रदेश
- Province
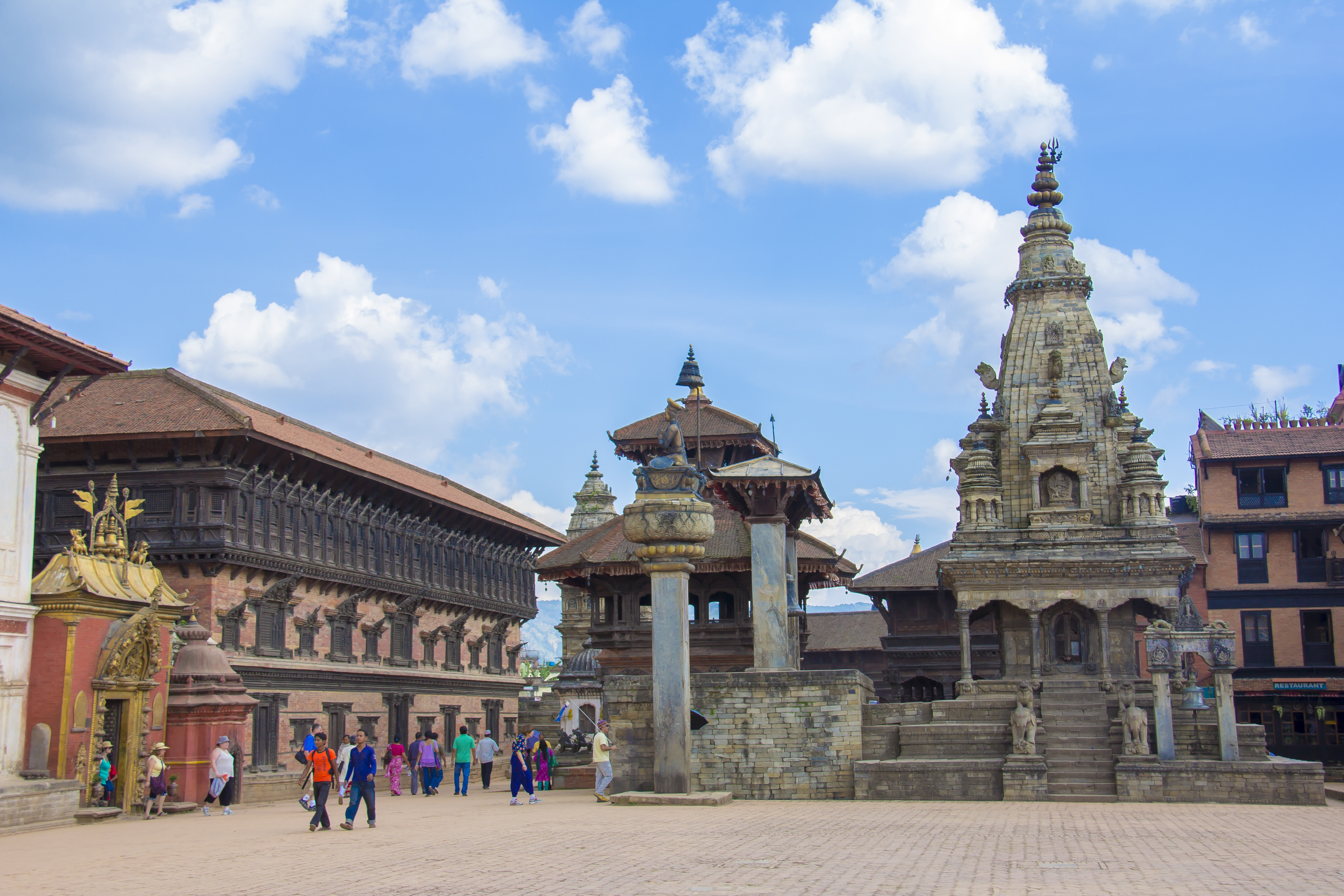
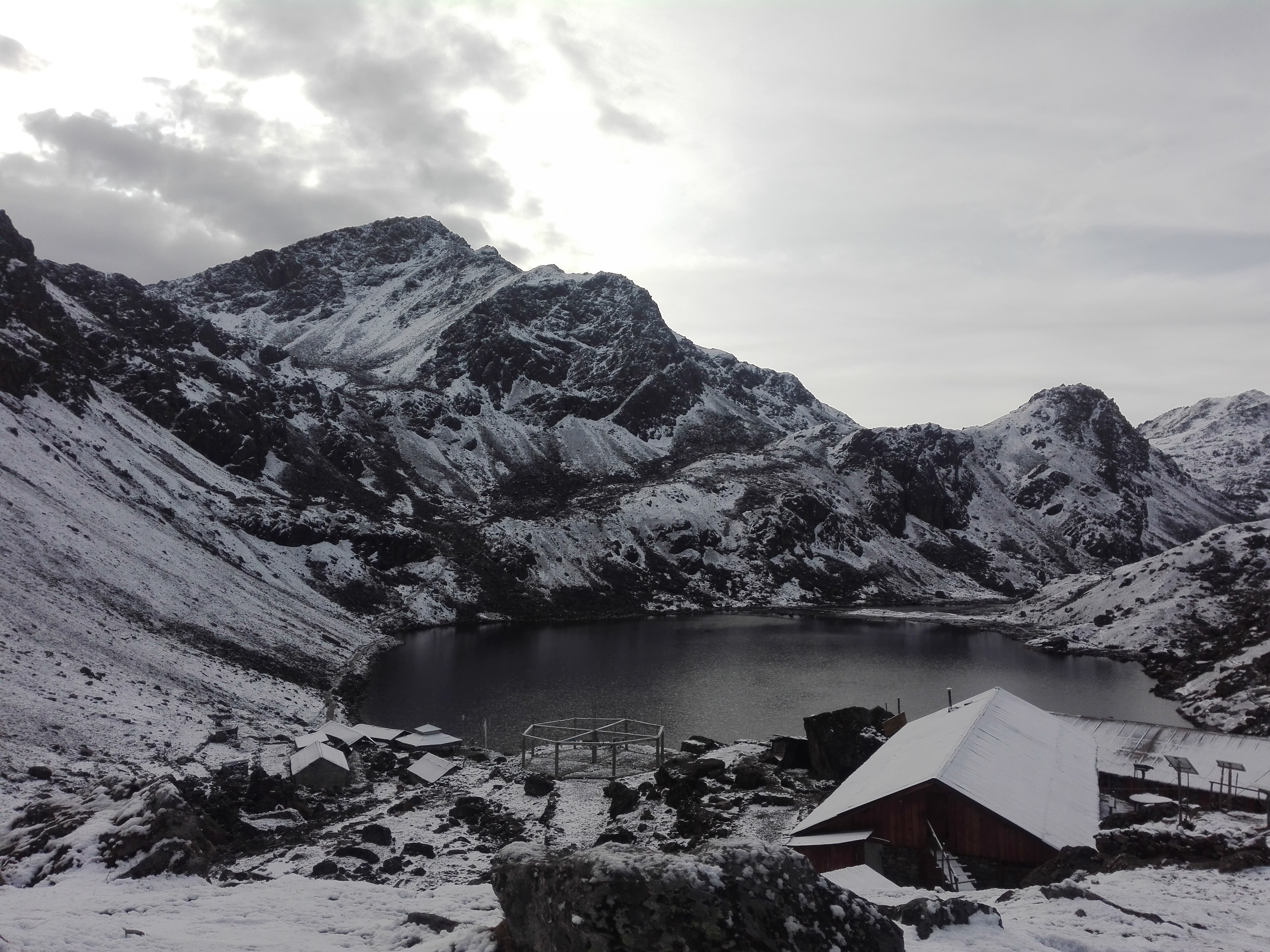
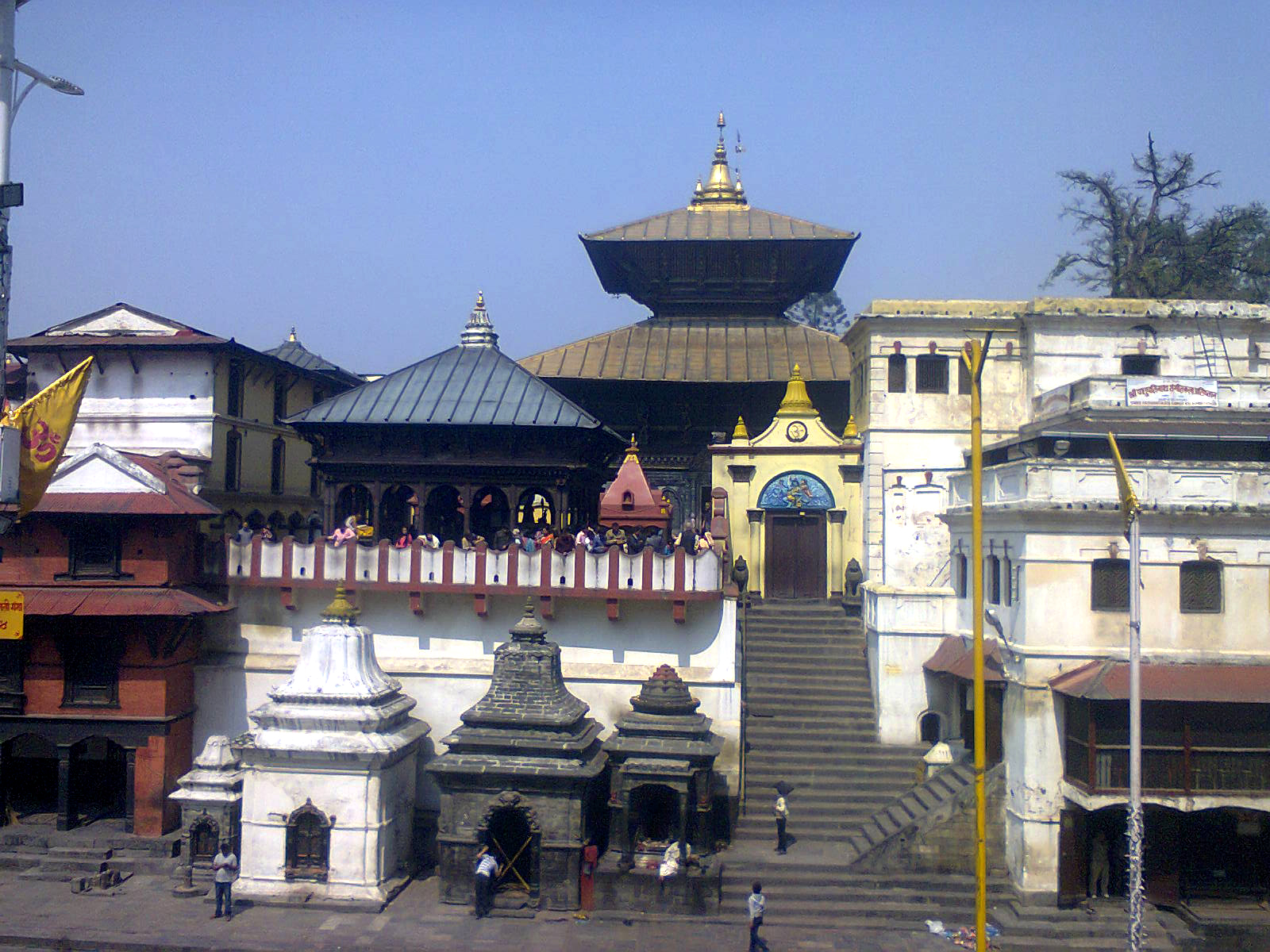
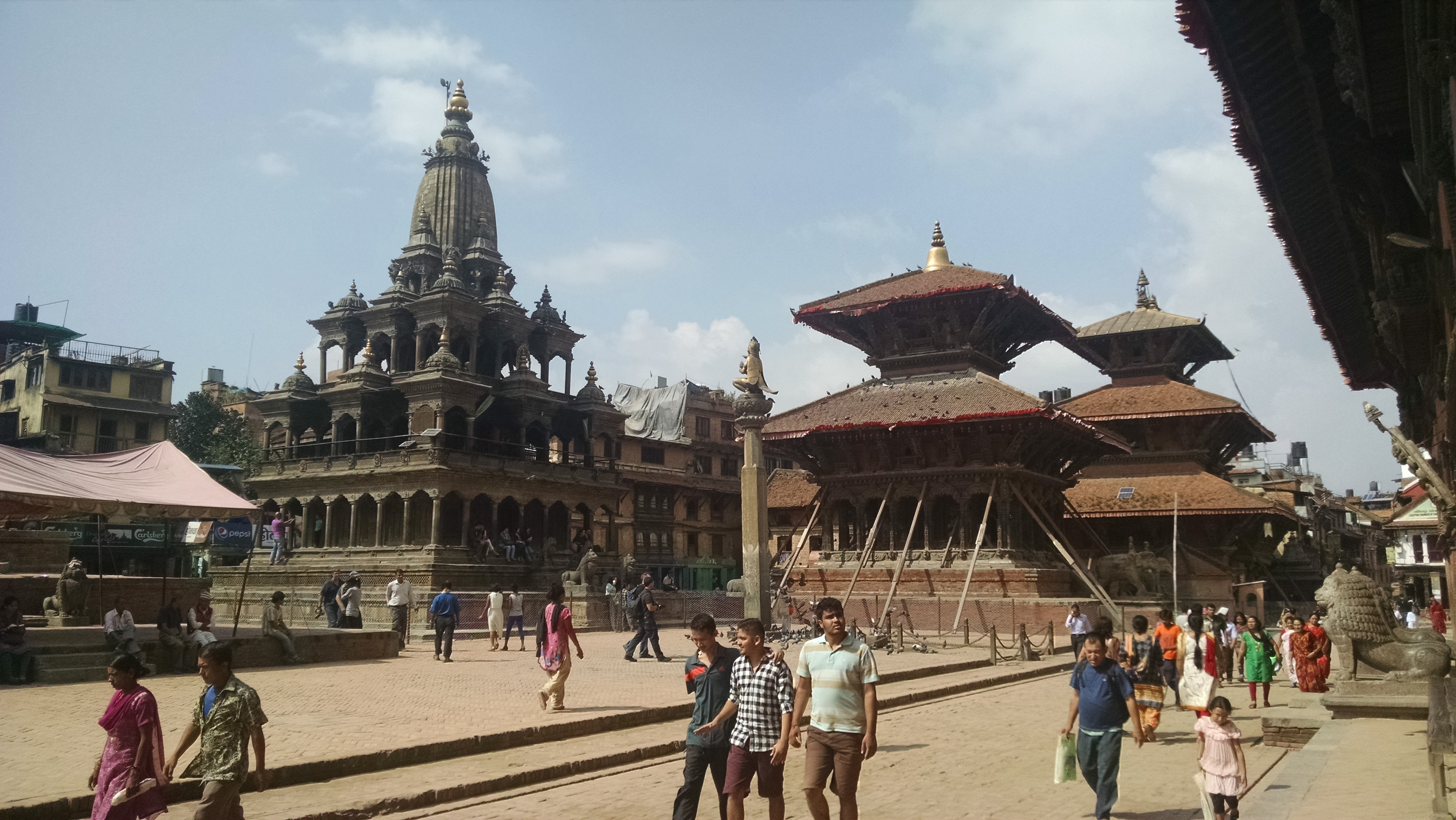
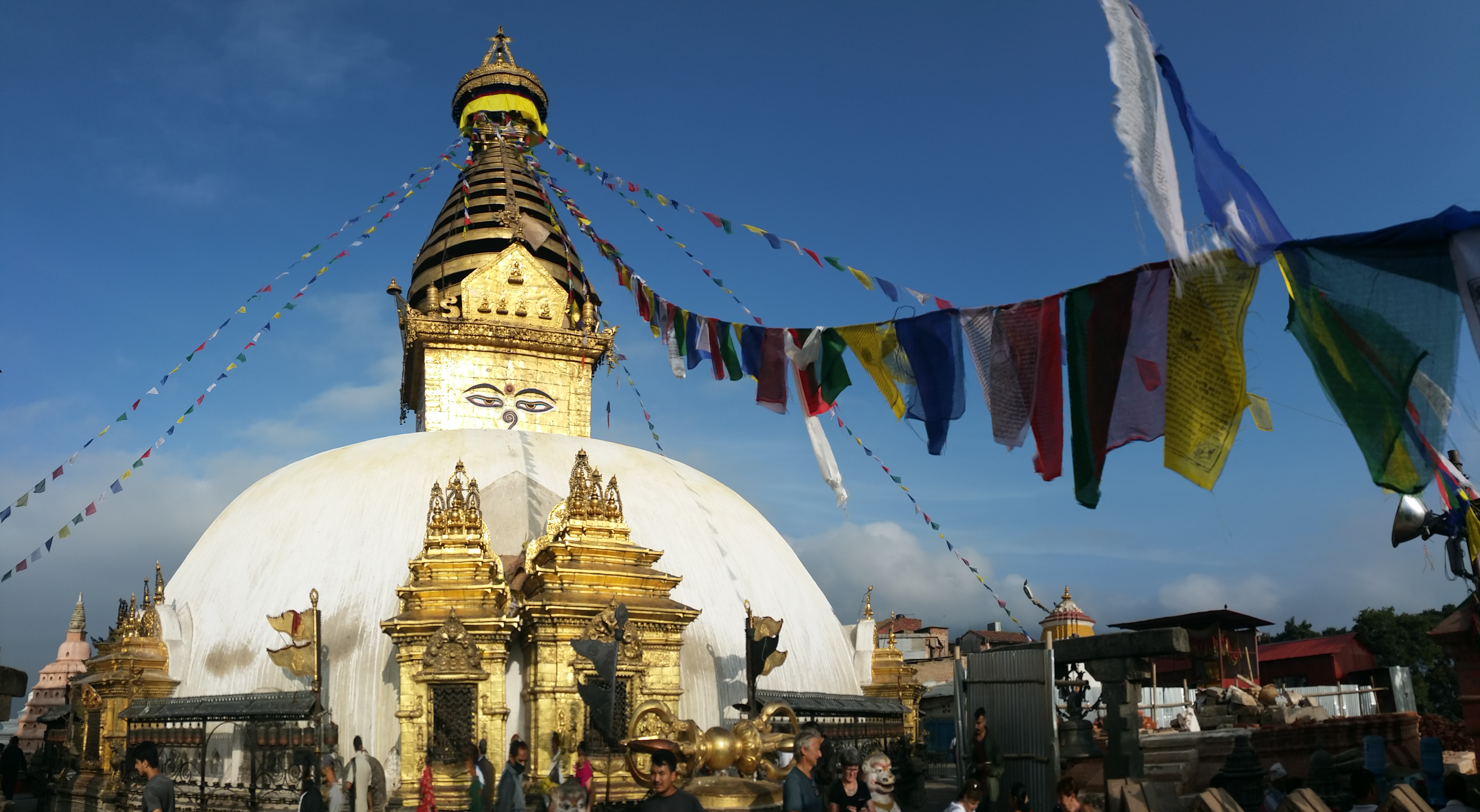
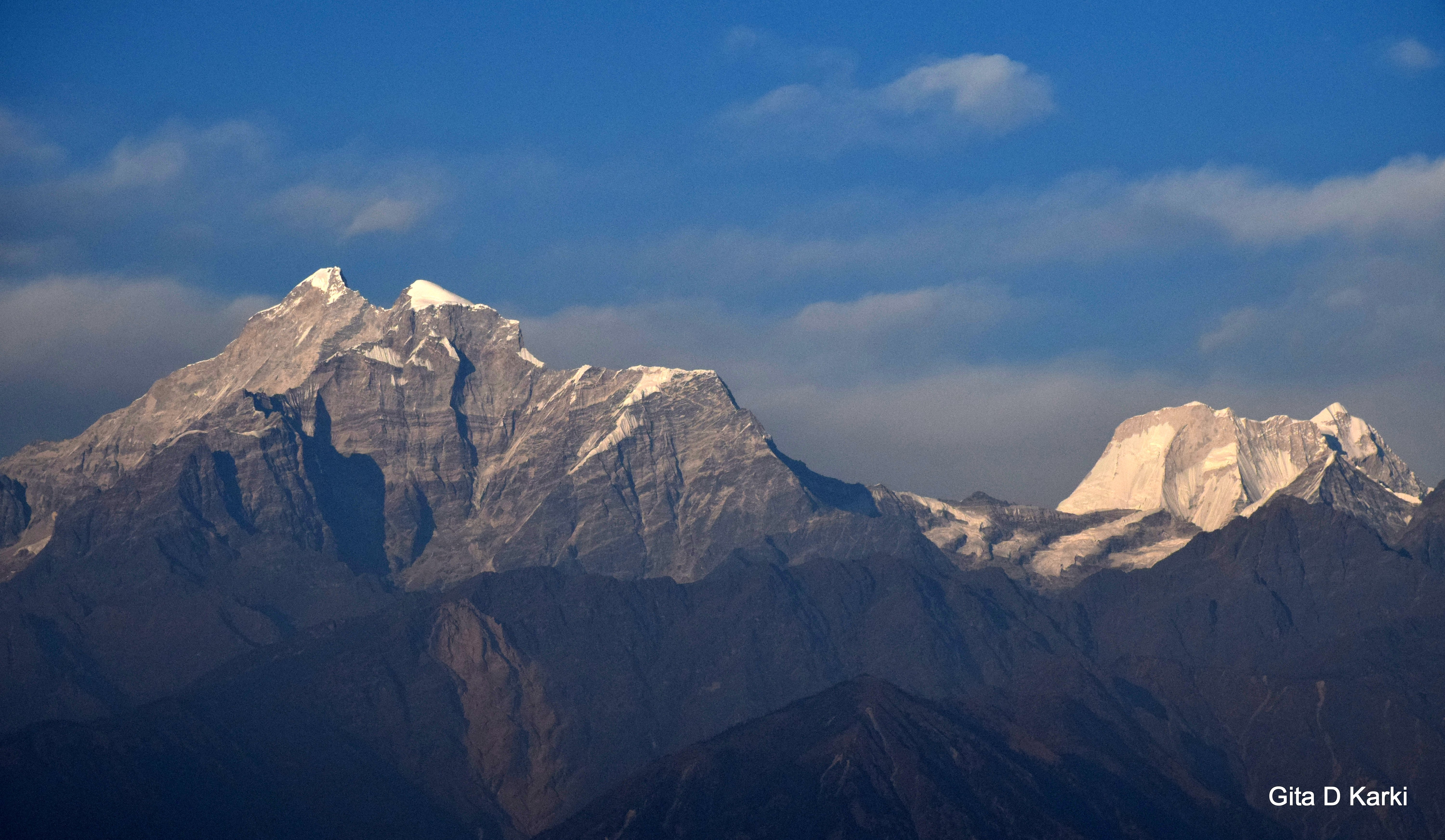
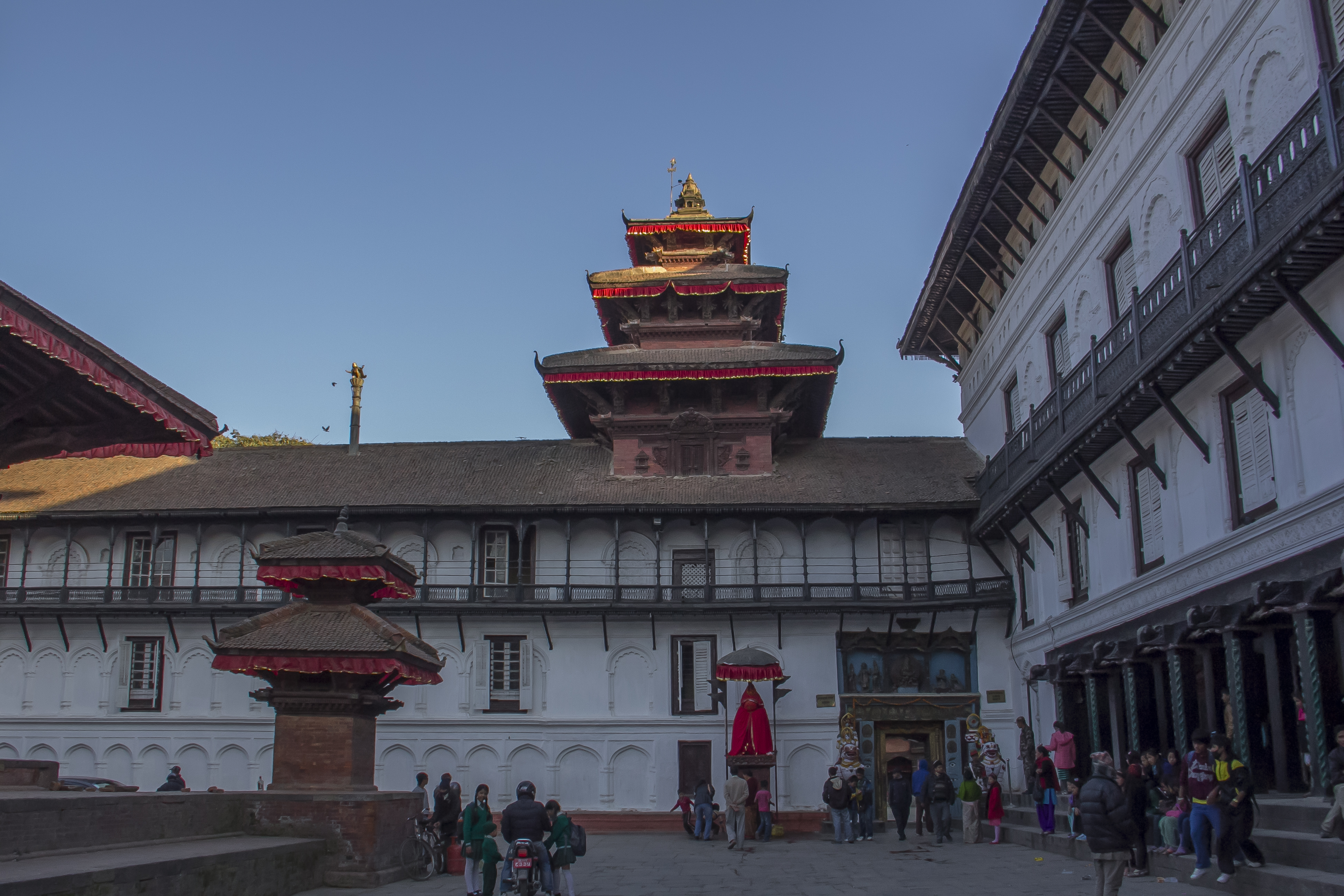
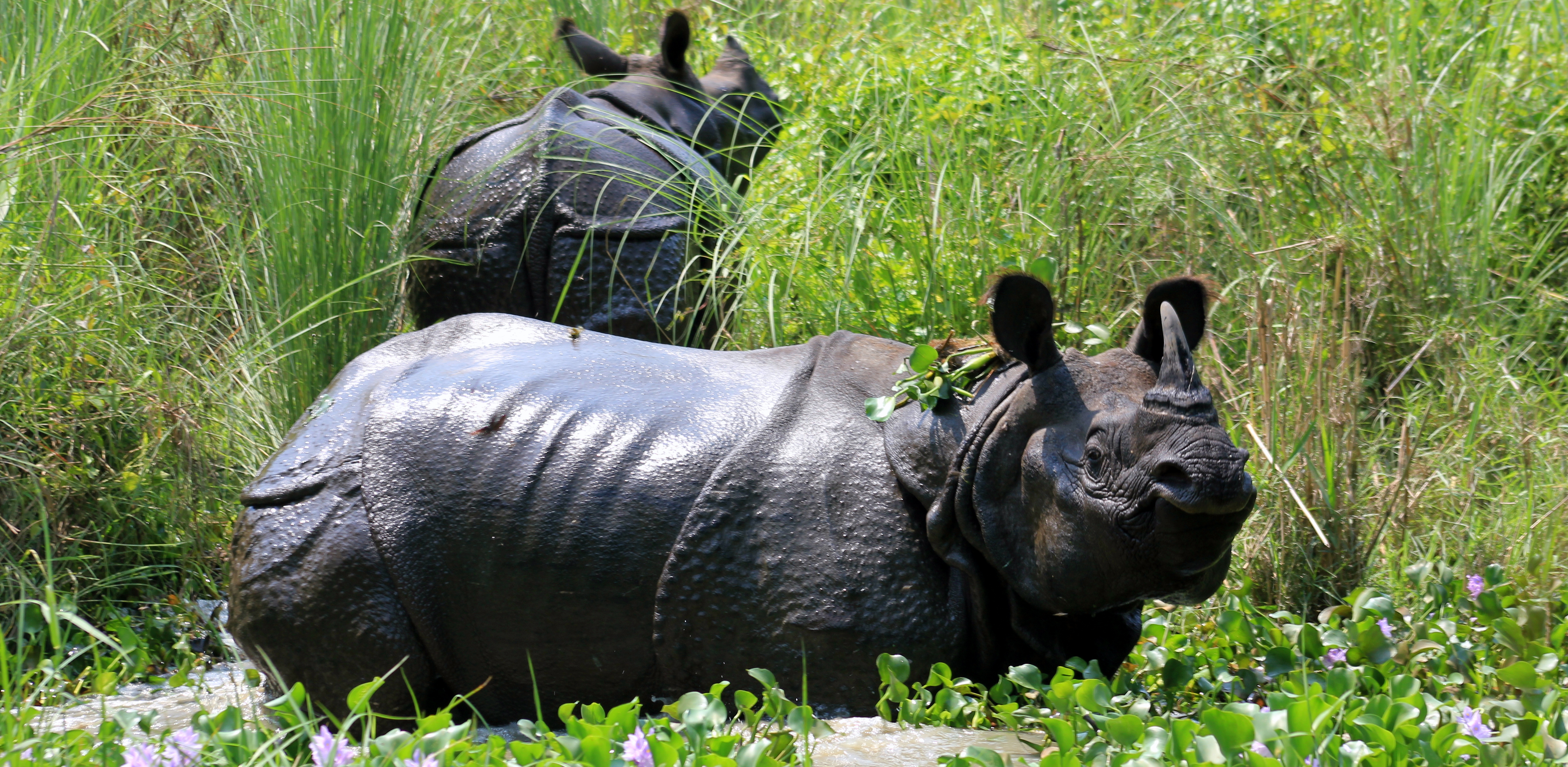
- From top left to right: Bhaktapur Durbar Square, Gosainkunda, Pashupatinath Temple, Patan Durbar Square, Swayambhunath, Gaurishankar, Hanuman Dhoka and One-horned rhinoceros at Chitwan National Park

- Seal

- Location in Nepal
- Interactive map of Bagmati Province
- Country: Nepal
- Formation: 20 September 2015
- Capital: Hetauda
- Largest city: Kathmandu
- Districts: 13

Government
  - Type: Self governing province
  - Body: Government of Bagmati Province
  - Governor: Deepak Prasad Devkota
  - Chief Minister: Kiran Thapa Magar
  - Legislature: Unicameral (110 seats)
  - Parliamentary constituency: House of Representatives (33); National Assembly (8)
  - High Court: Patan High Court

Area
  - Total: 20,300 km^{2} (7,800 sq mi)
  - Rank: 5th
- Highest elevation (Ganesh Himal): 7,422 m (24,350 ft)
- Lowest elevation (Golaghat): 141 m (463 ft)

Population (2021)
  - Total: 6,116,866
  - Rank: 1st
  - Density: 301/km^{2} (780/sq mi)
  - Rank: 2nd
- Time zone: UTC+5:45 (NST)
- Geocode: NP-TH
- ISO 3166 code: NP-P3
- Official language: Nepali
- Other Official language(s): 1.Tamang language 2.Nepal Bhasa
- Ethnic groups: Tamang 20.54%; Bahun 18.32%; Chhetri 17.13%; Newar 17.07%; Magar 4.87%; Kami 2.52%; Gurung 2.22%; Tharu 1.63%; Damai 1.36%; Rai 1.52%; Sarki 1.33%; Chepang 1.16%
- HDI: ▲0.673 (medium)
- HDI rank: 1st
- Literacy: ▲83% (2024)
- Sex ratio: 98.77 ♂ /100 ♀ (2011)
- GDP: US$ 17.9 billion
- GDP Per Capita: US$ 2,809
- Website: ocmcm.bagamati.gov.np

Bagmati Province (Nepali: बागमती प्रदेश, Bāgmatī pradēśa) is one of the seven provinces of Nepal established by the constitution of Nepal. Bagmati is Nepal's foremost populous province and fifth largest province by area. It is bordered by Tibet Autonomous Region of China to the north, Gandaki Province to the west, Koshi Province to the east, Madhesh Province and the Indian state of Bihar to the south. With Hetauda as its provincial headquarters, the province is also the home to the country's capital Kathmandu, is mostly hilly and mountainous, and hosts mountain peaks including Gaurishankar, Langtang, Jugal, and Ganesh.

Being the most populous province of Nepal, it possesses rich cultural diversity with resident communities and castes including Thami (Thangmi), Newar, Tamang, Sherpa, Tharu, Chepang, Jirel, Brahmin, Chhetri, and more. It hosted the highest number of voters in the 2017 election for the House of Representatives and Provincial Assembly.

== Etymology ==
Bagmati is named after the Bagmati River which runs through the Kathmandu valley. The river is considered the source of the Newar civilization and urbanization. The river has been mentioned as Vaggumuda (Nepali: वग्गुमुदा) in Vinaya Pitaka and Nandabagga. It has also been mentioned as Bahumati (Nepali: बाहुमति) in Battha Suttanta of Majjhima Nikaya. An inscription dated 477 A.D. describes the river as Bagvati Parpradeshe (Nepali: वाग्वति पारप्रदेशे) and subsequently in the Gopalraj Vanshavali.

A provincial assembly meeting on 12 January 2020 endorsed the proposal to name the province as Bagmati by a majority vote. Hetauda was declared as the permanent state capital on 12 January 2020.

== Geography ==
Bagmati Province has an area of 20,300 km^{2} (7,800 sq mi) which is about 13.79% of the total area of Nepal. The elevation of the province ranges from 141 m (463 ft) at Golaghat in Chitwan District to 7,422 m (24,350 ft) at Ganesh Himal. The province has an altitude low enough to support deciduous, coniferous, and alpine forests and woodlands. 27.29% land is covered by forest. The temperature varies with altitude. There are 10 sub-basins and 33 major rivers flowing through the province. The longest river is the Sunkoshi measuring 160.19 km (99.54 mi).

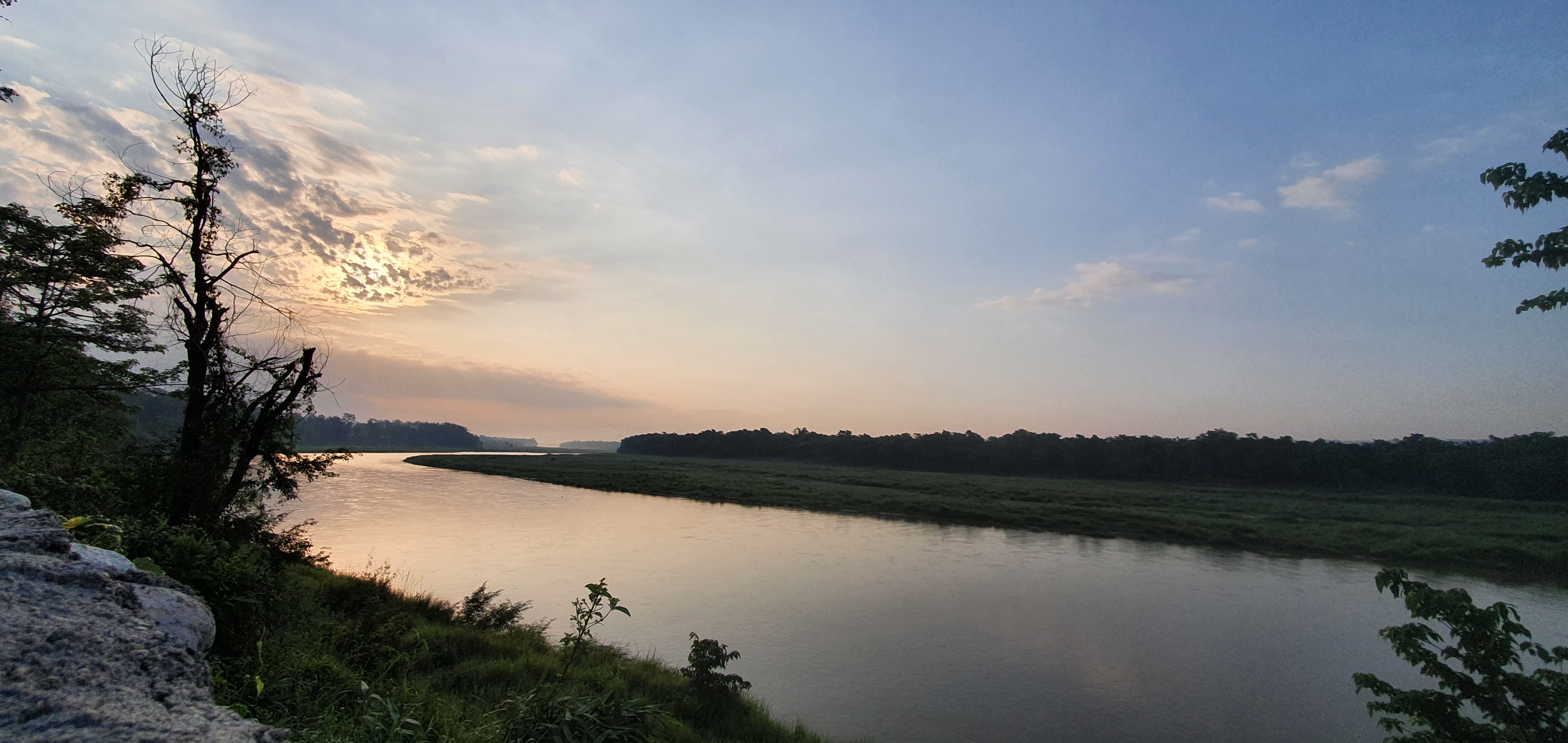
Plains of Chitwan

=== Climate ===
Bagmati province has climatic variations, which are associated with the diverse nature of its topography and altitude. The climatic zone of Bagmati province starts from the High Himalaya in the north, above 5,000 m (16,000 ft) with tundra and an arctic climate to the Siwalik region in the south, 500–1,000 m (1,600–3,300 ft) with a sub-tropical climatic zone. The annual precipitation also varies from 150 to 200 mm (5.9 to 7.9 in) in the high Himalayas to 1,100–3,000 mm (43–118 in) in the southern plains. Similarly, the average annual temperature of the province varies from 30 to −10 °C (86 to 14 °F). Rainfall takes place mainly during the summer.

Average temperatures and precipitation for selected communities in Bagmati
Location	August (°C)	January (°C)	Annual Precipitation (mm)
Banepa	23.7	9.9	1930.8
Bharatpur	27.6	14.2	2550.1
Hetauda	26.5	12.9	2069.5
Suryabinayak	21.4	7.7	1821.7
Kathmandu	23	10	1360
Kirtipur	23.5	9.4	2100.9

== History ==
During the Licchavi and Malla period, this region was known as Nepalmandal and was ruled by Newar kings. Historically the area of Bagmati province known as "Kathmandu Kshetra", which was established in 1956. Kathmandu Kshetra was composed by grouping the then five districts. Those five districts are now divided into many districts. Kathmandu Kshetra had a total area of 6,144 square miles (15,910 km^{2}) and total population was 17.93 Lakhs (1.7 million).

The five districts were:

1. Narayani District (Bara, Parsa, Rautahat)
2. Rapti District (Chitwan, Ramechap, Makwanpur)
3. Chautara District (Sindhupalchok, Kavrepalanchowk)
4. Trishuli District (Nuwakot, Dhading)
5. Kathmandu District (Kathmandu, Lalitpur, Bhaktapur)

In 1962, administrative system restructured and the "Kshetras" system cancelled and the country restructured into 75 development districts and those districts were grouped into zones. In 1972, the region was named to Central Development Region. It had 3 zones and 19 districts.

=== Major historical forts of Bagmati ===
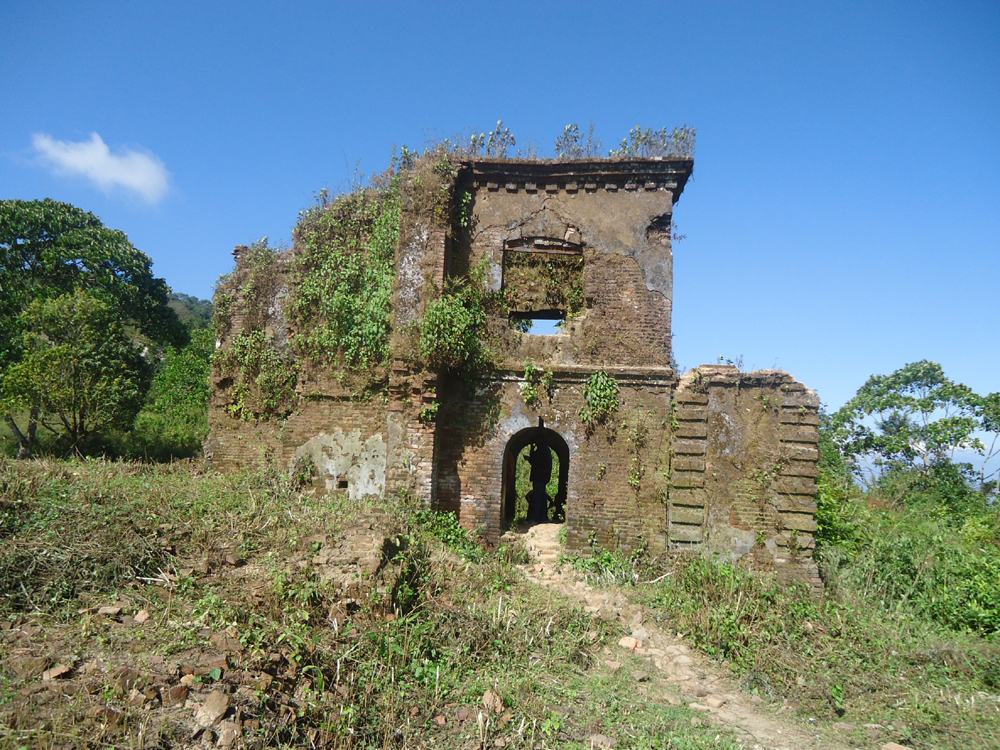
Sindhuli Fort

Makwanpurgadhi is located about 17 kilometers northeast of Hetauda, the district headquarters of Makwanpur district. Makwanpur Fort is a place of historical and tourist importance in Makwanpur district.

Sindhuli Gadhi is an important place in terms of natural beauty and history. This place is about 150 kilometers east of Kathmandu. Sindhuligadi Nepal is a living document of the British War.

Rasuwa Fort on the Nepal-China border is considered to be an important security fort between Nepal and China. The historical fortress is about a century and a half old.

== Demographics ==
According to the 2021 Nepal Census, Bagmati Province has a population of 61,16,866. The province has the First-highest population in the country having 20.84% of the population. The population density of the province is 300 people per square kilometre which is the second highest in the country. 6.51% of the population was under 5 years of age. Bagmati Province has a literacy rate of 82.06%.

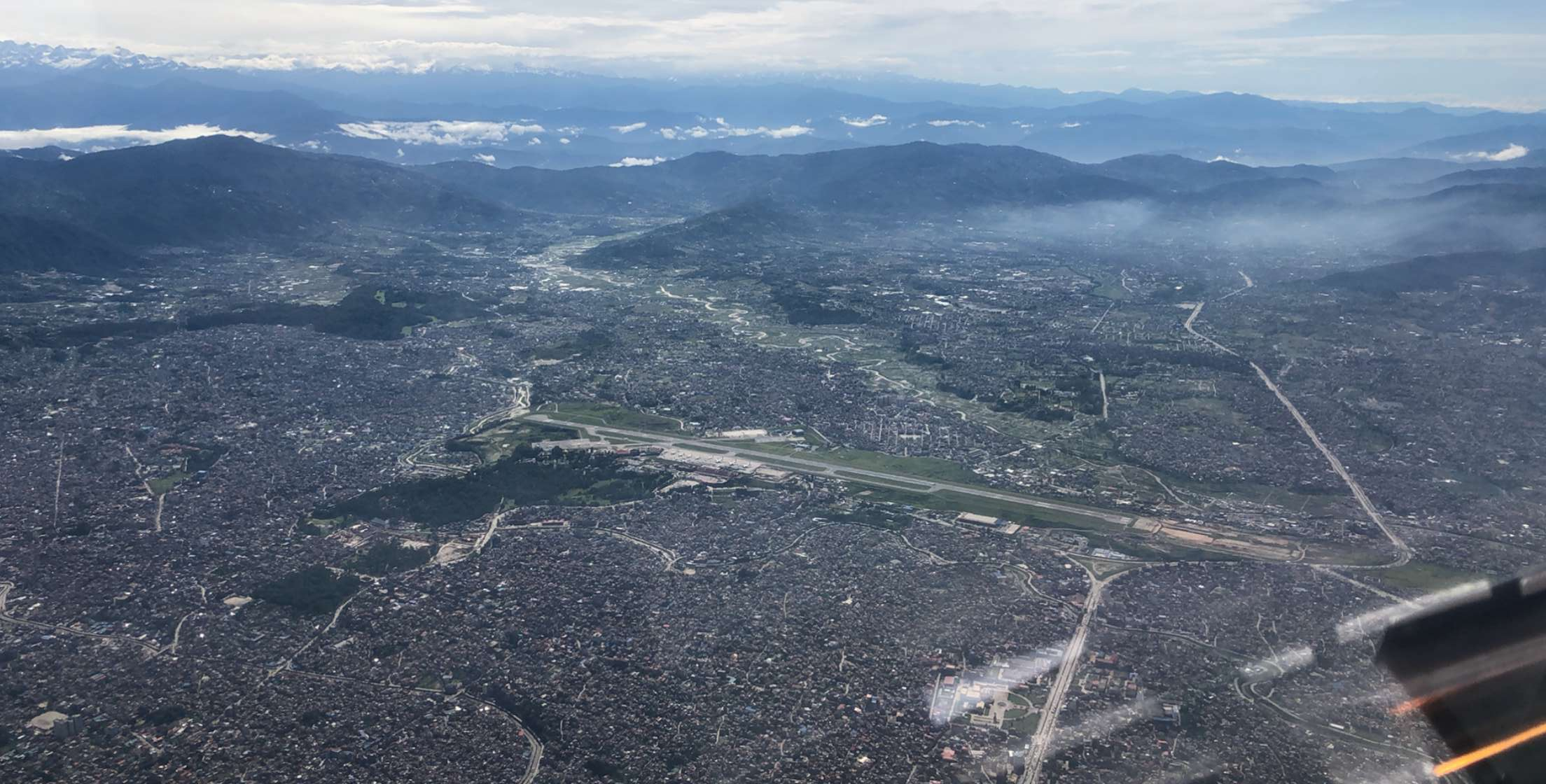
Urbanization in Kathmandu

=== Ethnic groups ===
Castes/ethnic groups in Bagmati Province (2021)
1. Tamang (19.9%)
2. Hill Brahman (17.8%)
3. Chhetri (17.4%)
4. Newar (15.6%)
5. Magar (5.11%)
6. Kami (2.75%)
7. Gurung (2.30%)
8. Rai (1.84%)
9. Tharu (1.80%)
10. Damai (1.33%)
11. Sarki (1.38%)
12. Chepang (1.27%)
13. Sherpa (0.95%)
14. Other Hill Janjati (4.16%)
15. Madheshi non-Dalit (1.96%)
16. Other Khas non-Dalit (1.70%)
17. Others (2.74%)

Tamang is the largest ethnic group in the province making up around 19.89% of the population. Hill Brahmans are the next largest group making up around 17.84% of the population followed by Chhetris (17.41%) and Newars (15.57%) respectively. Similarly Magar, Kami and Gurung make up 5.11%, 2.75% and 2.30% of the population respectively. Tharu (1.80%), Rai (1.84%), Damai (1.55%), Sarki (1.38%) and Chepang (1.27%) are other smaller ethnic groups in the province.

=== Languages ===
Languages in Bamgati Province (2021)
1. Nepali (56.0%)
2. Tamang (18.0%)
3. Nepal Bhasa (11.8%)
4. Magar (2.40%)
5. Tharu (1.56%)
6. Maithili (1.25%)
7. Bhojpuri (1.14%)
8. Gurung (1.11%)
9. Chepang (0.90%)
10. Others (5.78%)

Nepali is the most common mother tongue in the province with 56.04% of the population speaking Nepali as their mother tongues. Tamang language is spoken by 18.00% and Nepal Bhasa is spoken by 11.82% of the population as their mother tongue. Magar (2.30%), Gurung (1.11%) and Chepang (0.90%) are other languages spoken in the province. Madheshi languages such as Maithili and Bhojpuri are spoken by Madheshi and Muslim migrants to Kathmandu from the plains as well as in Chitawan district.

The Language Commission of Nepal has recommended Nepal Bhasa and Tamang as official language in the province.

=== Religion ===
Religion in Bagmati Province (2021)
1. Hinduism (72.0%)
2. Buddhism (22.3%)
3. Christianity (3.30%)
4. Kirat Mundhum (1.34%)
5. Islam (0.79%)
6. Other or not stated (0.27%)

Hinduism is the most followed religion in the province, with 72.03% of the population identifying as Hindus. Buddhists are the largest minority population with 23.3% of the population following Buddhism and Christianity is followed by 3.30% of the population in the province.

== Administrative subdivisions ==
There are total 119 local administrative units in the province which include 3 metropolitan cities, 1 sub-metropolitan city, 41 urban municipalities and 74 rural municipalities.

Bagmati is divided into 13 districts, which are listed below. A district is administered by the head of the District Coordination Committee and the District Administration Officer. The districts are further divided into municipalities or rural municipalities.

=== Districts ===
Districts in Nepal are the second level of administrative divisions after provinces. Bagmati Province is divided into 13 districts, which are listed below. A district is administered by the head of the District Coordination Committee and the District Administration Officer. The districts are further divided into municipalities or rural municipalities.

Districts of Bagmati Province
Districts	Headquarters	Population (2021)
Sindhuli	Sindhulimadhi	300,026
Ramechhap	Manthali	170,302
Dolakha	Bhimeshwar	172,767
Bhaktapur	Bhaktapur	432,132
Dhading	Dhading Besi	325,710
Kathmandu	Kathmandu	2,041,587
Kavrepalanchok	Dhulikhel	364,039
Lalitpur	Lalitpur	551,667
Nuwakot	Bidur	263,391
Rasuwa	Dhunche	46,689
Sindhupalchok	Chautara	262,624
Chitwan	Bharatpur	719,859
Makwanpur	Hetauda	466,073

=== Municipalities ===
Cities and villages are governed by municipalities in Nepal. A district may have one or more municipalities. Bagmati has two types of municipalities.

1. Urban Municipality (Urban Municipality has three levels):
  1. Metropolitan city (Mahanagarpalika)
  2. Sub-metropolitan city (Upa-mahanagarpalika) and
  3. Municipality (Nagarpalika)
2. Rural Municipality (Gaunpalika)

The government of Nepal has set out a minimum criteria to meet cities and towns. These criteria include a certain population, infrastructure and revenues.

Largest cities or towns in Bagmati Province Central Bureau of Statistics
Rank		District	Pop.	Rank		District	Pop.
1	Kathmandu	Kathmandu	845,767	11	Kageshwori Manohara	Kathmandu	133,327
2	Bharatpur	Chitwan	369,377	12	Madhyapur Thimi	Bhaktapur	119,955
3	Lalitpur	Lalitpur	299,843	13	Mahalaxmi	Lalitpur	118,710
4	Hetauda	Makawanpur	195,951	14	Nagarjun	Kathmandu	115,507
5	Budhanilkantha	Kathmandu	179,688	15	Godawari	Lalitpur	100,972
6	Tarakeshor	Kathmandu	151,508	16	Ratnanagar	Chitwan	90,978
7	Gokarneshwar	Kathmandu	151,200	17	Changunarayan	Bhaktapur	88,612
8	Suryabinayak	Bhaktapur	137,971	18	Kirtipur	Kathmandu	81,782
9	Chandragiri	Kathmandu	136,928	19	Bhaktapur	Bhaktapur	78,854
10	Tokha	Kathmandu	135,741	20	Kamalamai	Sindhuli	71,811

== Government and administration ==
Bagmati provincial assembly is the unicameral legislative assembly consisting of 110 members. Candidates for each constituency are chosen by the political parties or stand as independents. Each constituency elects one member under the first past the post (FPTP) system of election. The current constitution specifies that sixty percent of the members should be elected from the first past the post system and forty percent through the party-list proportional representation (PR) system. Women should account for one-third of total members elected from each party. If one-third percentage are not elected, the party that fails to ensure so shall have to elect one-third of the total number as women through the party-list proportional representation. The Governor acts as the head of the province, while the Chief Minister is the head of the provincial government. The Chief Judge of the Patan High Court is the head of the judiciary.

The present Governor, Chief Minister and Chief Judge are Yadav Chandra Sharma, Rajendra Prasad Pandey and Tek Bahadur Moktan respectively. The provincial assembly has 110 members while the province has 33 House of Representative constituencies. The term length of provincial assembly is five years. The Provincial Assembly is currently housed at the Regional Education Directorate in Hetauda.

Party	FPTP			PR			Total
Party	Votes	%	Seats	Votes	%	Seats	Total
CPN (Unified Marxist-Leninist)	725,113	35.37	41	677,317	35.81	12	45
CPN (Unified Socialist)	725,113	35.37	9	677,317	35.81	4	13
Nepali Congress	748,207	36.50	9	559,249	29.57	14	23
Nepali Congress	21,552	1.05	9	23,958	1.27	14	23
CPN (Maoist Centre)	355,126	16.32	15	316,876	16.75	8	23
Bibeksheel Sajha Party	74,656	3.64	0	124,442	6.58	3	3
Rastriya Prajatantra Party	27,960	1.36	0	59,268	3.13	1	1
Nepal Mazdoor Kisan Party	40,502	1.98	1	41,610	2.20	1	2
Rastriya Prajatantra Party (Democratic)	1,399	0.07	0	28,855	1.53	1	1
Others	50,791	3.48	0	59,731	3.16	0	0
Independent	4,688	0.23	0	–	–	–	0
Invalid/Blank votes	70,471	–	–	226,043	–	–	–
Total	2,120,465	100	66	2,117,314	100	44	110
Registered voters/turnout	3,074,381	68.97	–	3,074,381	68.87	–	–
Source: Election Commission of Nepal

== Economy ==
Bagmati Province is the most industrialized province and has maintained the leading position in the economic sector in Nepal. With GDP of NPR 1.43 Trillion (as of 2019), Bagmati alone is the single largest contributor to the national economy with a share of 36.8% in the country's GDP.

=== Major business groups ===
- Ncell
- NTC
- Chaudhary Group
- Panchakanya Group

== Education ==
The province has always been an educational hub of the country.

Enrollment rate in primary school in the province is 95.79, whereas adult literacy stands at 74.85%.

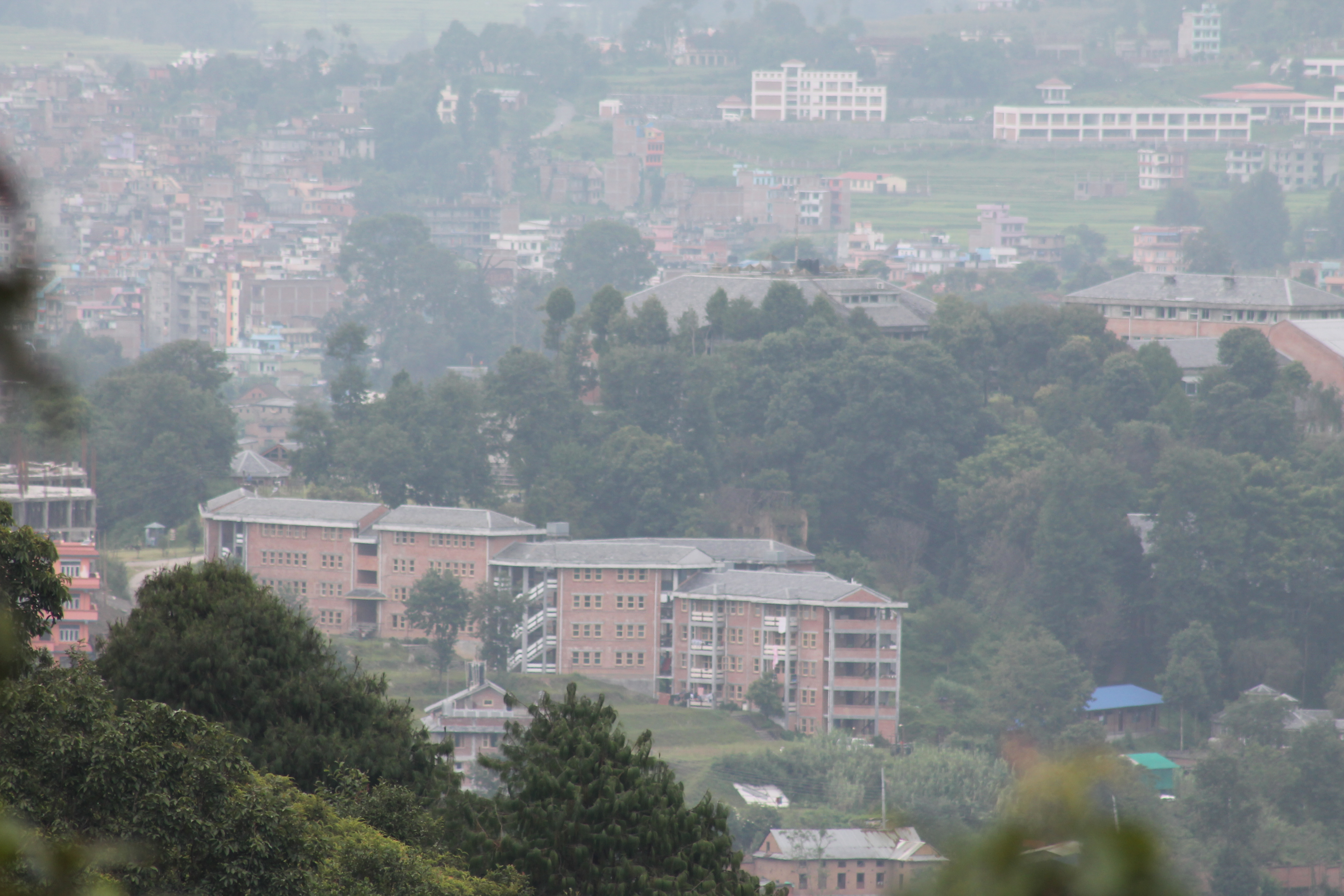
Kathmandu University

There are various education levels in Bagmati Province. They are: Primary Level (31%), Lower Secondary Level (18%), Secondary Level (11%), SLC (12%), Intermediate Level (11%), Beginner (3%), Non-formal (5%), Graduate (6%), Postgraduate and above (2%).

=== Universities ===
- Agriculture and Forestry University in Rampur, Chitwan
- Bagmati University
- Kathmandu University in Dhulikhel
- Nepal Open University in Lalitpur
- Madan Bhandari Academy of Health Sciences in Hetauda

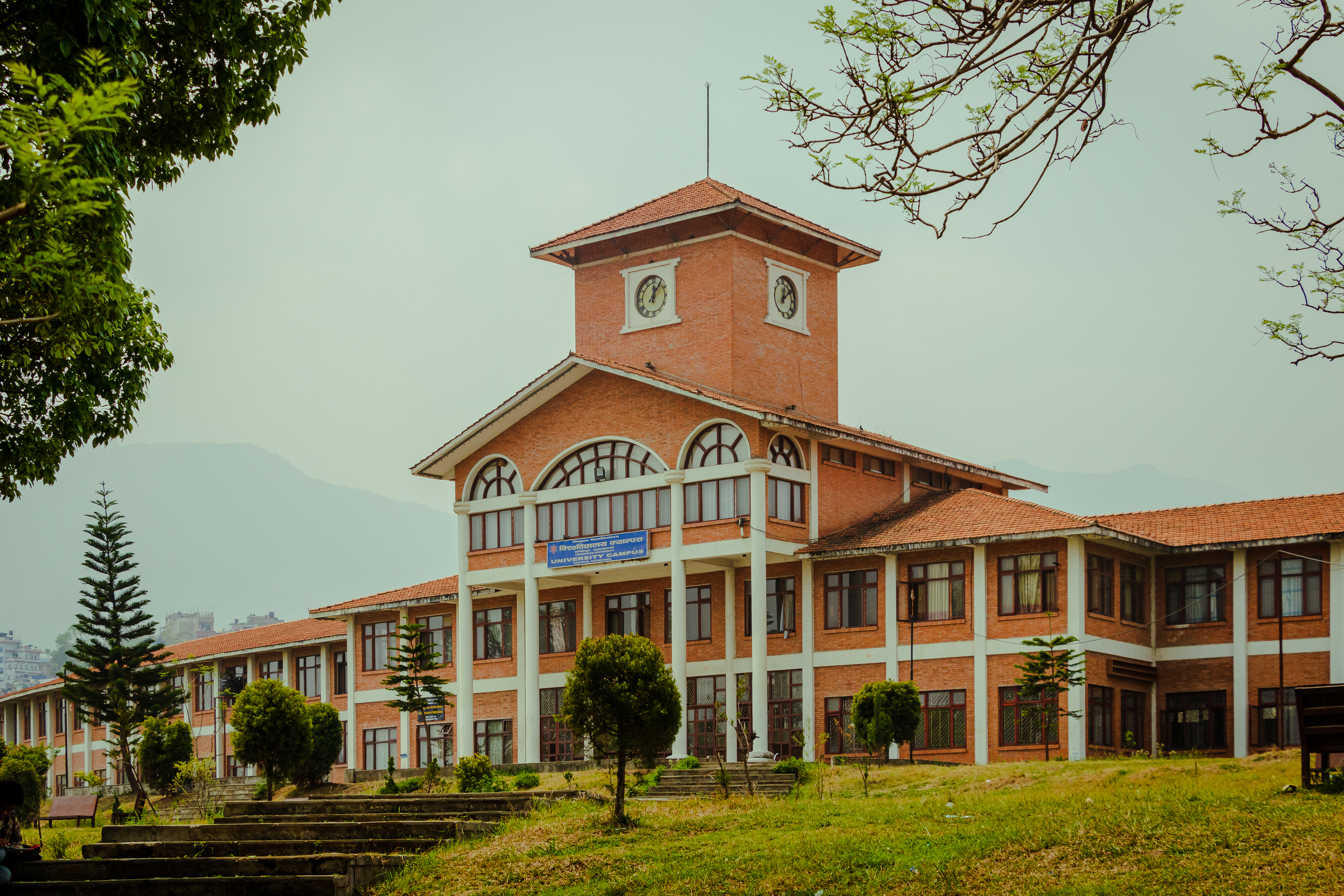
Tribhuvan University

- Madan Bhandari University of Science and Technology

(Nepali: मदन भण्डारी विज्ञान तथा प्रविधि विश्वविद्यालय)

- National Academy of Medical Sciences (NAMS)
- National Defense University (Nepali: राष्ट्रिय रक्षा विश्वविद्यालय)
- Nepalese Army Institute of Health Sciences
- Patan Academy of Health Sciences
- Tribhuvan University

== Infrastructure ==
=== Health care ===
According to the National Demographic Health Survey (NDHS) 2016, the Province's Neonatal Mortality (per 1000 live births) stands at 17 and Infant mortality rate (per 1000 live births) stands at 29, both of which are below the national average of 21 and 32, respectively.

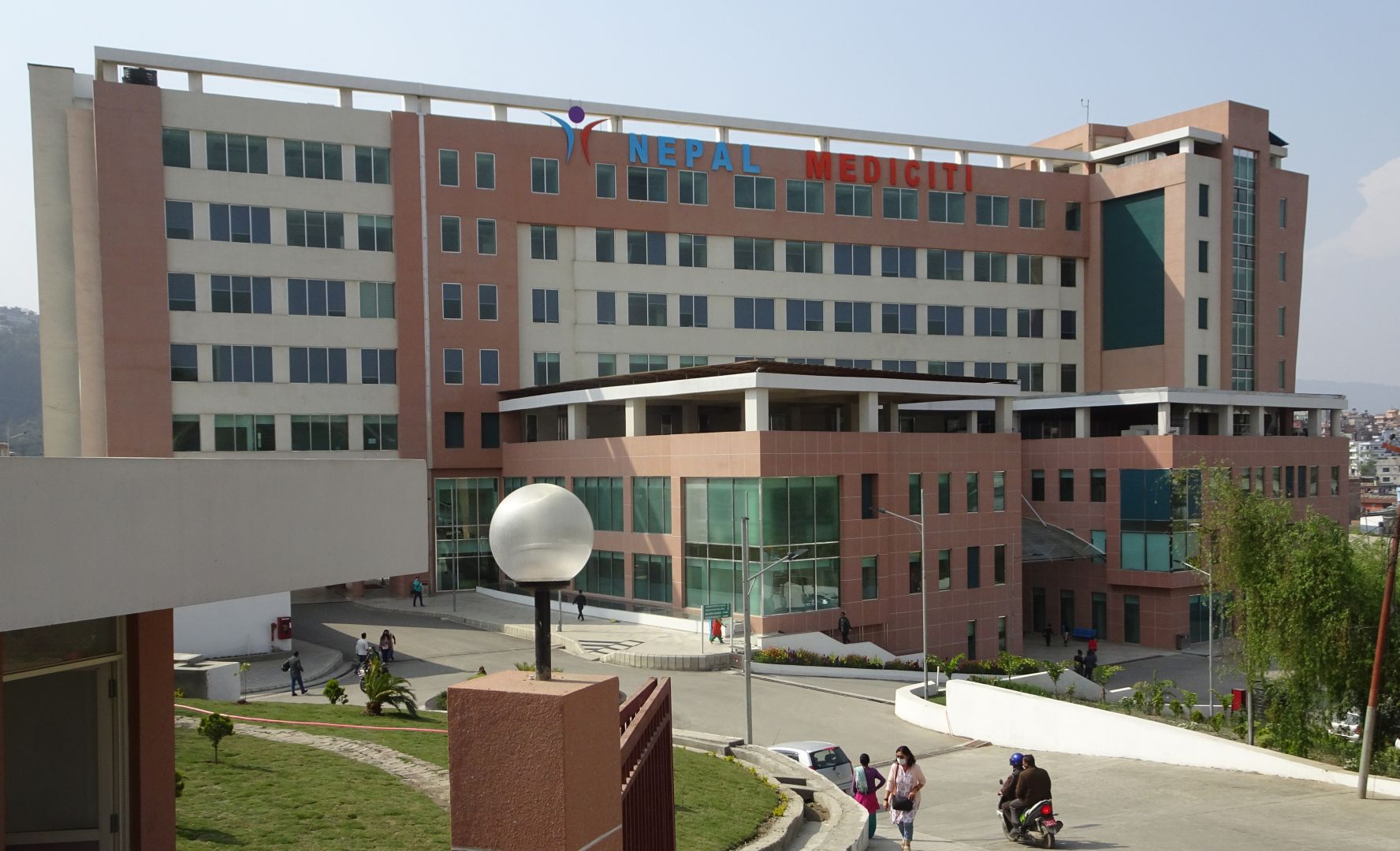
Nepal Medicity Hospital

According to the Annual report of Department of Health Services (DoHS) 2018/19, Bagmati Province has 35 public hospitals, 41 Primary Health Care Centres (PHCCs), 641 Health posts and 1417 Non-public facilities.

=== Communication ===
In Bagmati province, 58.6% have radio access, followed by 54.0% have access to TV, and only 10.0% have access to the internet. Similarly, 16.7% have access to landline telephones, while 76.1% have access to mobile phones. There are a total of 51 radio stations. Some of the radio stations are Radio Chitwan, Radio Upathyaka, and Radio Lalitpur. There are a total of 405 newspaper channels in Bagmati Province with national, Provincial and local outreach. As per the classification, some of the top-ranking newspapers are Gorkhapatra Dainik, Himalayan Times.

=== Energy ===
Bagmati Province has the second highest level of electrification with 94.44 percent electrification among the provinces. Districts like Kathmandu, Bhaktapur and Nuwakot are fully electrified. Sindhuli district has the lowest electrification rate with the coverage of 69.51% so far.

== Transportation ==
=== Highways ===
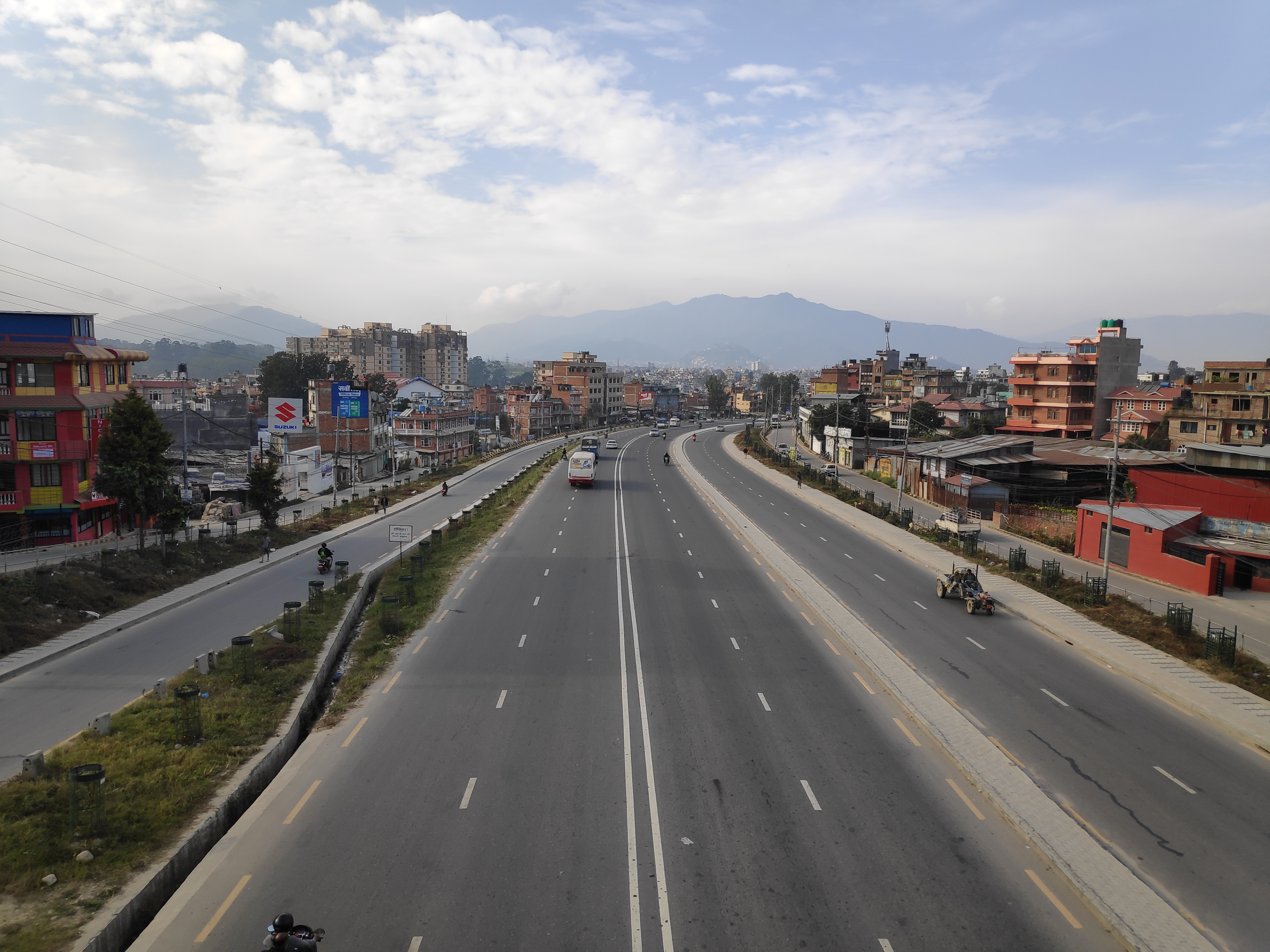
Ring Road of Kathmandu

Roads connect all 13 districts of Bagmati Province. However, people living in the high-altitude regions of Rasuwa, Sindhuplachok and Dolakha experience difficulty accessing roadways perennially. Major highways of the province are as follows:

1. Tribhuvan Highway: Tribhuvan Highway (NH41) which is also part of Asian Highway 42 ( AH42) connects the capital city with Birgunj, a major business hub in Province 2 bordered with India.
2. Araniko Highway: Araniko Highway (NH34) which is also part of Asian Highwa 42 ( AH42) connects capital city with Kodari on the Nepal-China border.
3. Prithivi Highway: Prithivi Highway (NH17) connects capital city via Naubise, Dhading with Pokhara in Gandaki Province. This landslide-prone and heavily congested highway passes through five districts: Kathmandu, Dhading, Chitwan, Tanahuand Kaski.
4. BP Koirala Highway: The BP Highway(NH13), also known as the Banepa- Bardibas Highway, links Kathmandu Valley with Province 2 and connects with eastern Nepal.

=== Airways ===
City served	Code	Airport name	Total Passenger	Remarks
International
Kathmandu Valley	KTM	Tribhuvan International Airport	▲9,482,788 (2024)	Major Hub Airport
Domestic
Bharatpur	BHR	Bharatpur Airport	▲234,566 (2024)	
Ramechhap	RHP	Ramechhap Airport	▼46,091(2024)	
Bharatpur	LTG	Meghauli Airport	—N/a	Military Usage only
Jiri	JIR	Jiri Airport	—N/a	Not in Operation
Langtang	MEY	Langtang Airport	—N/a	Not in Operation

=== Ropeways ===
- Manakamana Cable Car
- Chandragiri Cable Car
- Kalinchowk Cable Car

== Sports ==
Bagmati Province in Nepal is a hub for sports, with football, cricket, and volleyball being the most popular modern games, alongside traditional sports like Dandi Biyo, while also excelling in events like athletics, karate, and table tennis, hosting national events and developing provincial leagues, showcasing strong sports development supported by the National Sports Council.

Bagmati Province Sports Development Council, Hetauda is the main Provincial Sports organizing and Managing body with in the Province. It's the Provincial branch of National Sports Council. Through the Council Team Bagmati participates in National Games.

=== Football ===
Bagmati Province Football Association is the provincial body for football in Bagmati Province. Currently there are 11 District FAs are affiliated to Bagmati Province FA.

=== Cricket ===
Bagmati Province Cricket Association is the provincial body for Cricket in Bagmati Province. Currently there are 6 District CAs are affiliated to Bagmati Province CA.

=== Volleyball ===
Bagmati Province Volleyball Association is provincial body for Volleyball in Bagmati Province. Currently 7 District VAs are affiliated to Bagmati Province VA.

== See also ==
- Provinces of Nepal
- List of districts in Nepal
