= 2004 Beni attack =

Maoist attack on Beni, Nepal

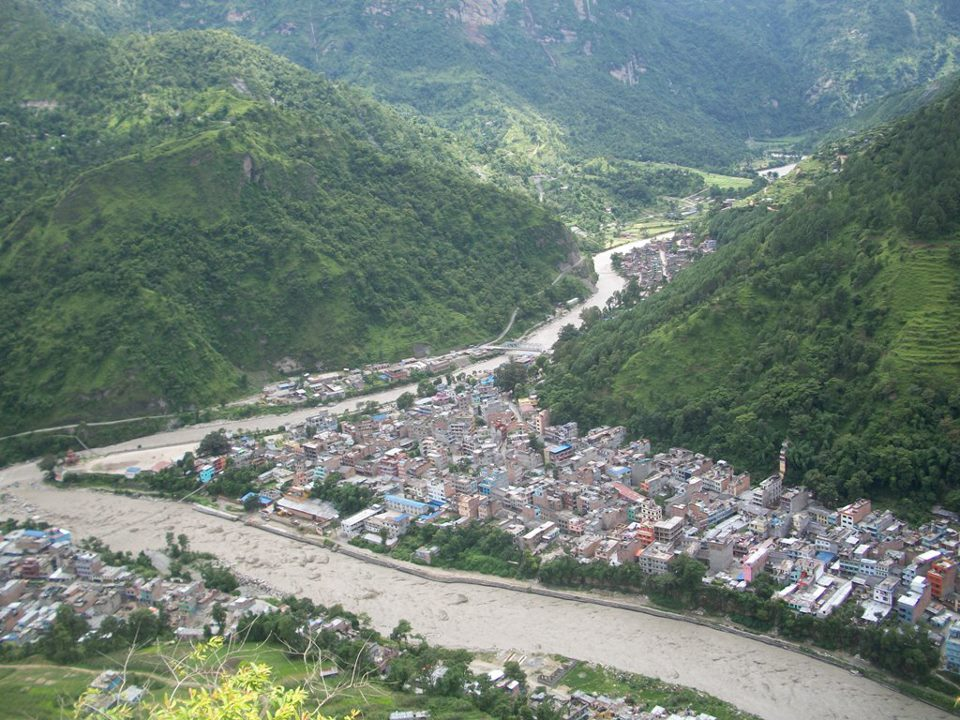
Beni (2012)

The 2004 Beni attack was one of the biggest attacks by the People's Liberation Army (PLA) of Communist Party of Nepal, Maoist, during the Nepalese Civil War (1996–2006). Almost the entire Western Division of the PLA, numbering around 3,500, attacked government positions in Beni, the district headquarters of Myagdi district in western Nepal, on 20 March 2004 at around 10 pm. Hundreds of civilians were used for logistics. Around 90 soldiers of the PLA and dozens of police and military personnel as well as civilians died. Multiple government buildings were destroyed and dozens of members of the civil service and government forces were kidnapped by the PLA.

== Background ==
By 2003, the Maoist guerilla fighters were organised into a centralised military force, the People's Liberation Army, with battalion-level formations. It was divided into the Eastern Division and the Western Division, led by Nanda Kishor Pun (Pasang) and Barshaman Pun (Ananta), respectively. The rebels believed that they had reached a "strategic balance" with the state, having defeated Nepal Police and fought with the army on equal terms, and were expecting to progress to the much awaited "strategic offensive" where they would push the army to the defensive. They believed they had mastered guerilla warfare and mobile warfare, the first two steps, according to Mao, of a protracted people's war, and were seeking to incorporate elements of the final step, the positional warfare, into their battle strategy. After the failure of the 2003 peace talks, the Maoists decided to start centralised attacks on government positions. Their first such attack, on positions in Dang and Banke, in October 2003, failed. By early 2004, the leadership started getting worried that the PLA cadre may get demoralised and frustrated, as the Nepalese Army (then Royal Nepalese Army (RNA)) claimed it had destroyed almost all of the PLA, while the PLA had not carried out successful large-scale attacks to disprove RNA's propaganda, in more than a year. The Maoists launched the Special People's Military Campaign in February 2004 to "militarize the entire population and create a mentality of resistance". But the Maoists had never had much success recruiting fighters without resorting to violence, coercion and kidnapping. From the Maoists' point of view, the "vacillating middle-class" needed to be shown that theirs was going to be the winning side in the conflict, in order to persuade it to finally take a side. The much smaller Eastern Division of the PLA carried out its attack on Bhojpur on 2 February 2004, resulting in 20 police and 12 military deaths. Around the same time, almost the whole of the Western Division began amassing in the Lukum village of Rukum District in preparation of a much larger attack on Beni, the Myagdi district headquarters.

== Preparation and march to Beni ==
Around 3,500 PLA fighters contributed by the Mangalsen First Brigade (1,200), Satbariya Second Brigade (1,000), Lisne-Gam Third Brigade (1,070) and Basu-Smriti Fourth Brigade (300) marched to Lukum village of Rukum District in early March. The soldiers spent a week in Lukum, preparing for battle. Division commander Pasang used sand models and videos to brief the brigade commanders on the layout of the town, the route and the plan of attack, and the soldiers practised their battle strategy in the playground of a local school. Meanwhile, the non-combatant activists of the entire West-Central Command were deployed for logistics. In the weeks leading up to the attack, people from the surrounding villages of Baglung and Myagdi districts were warned not to venture into Beni, and check-posts were established to monitor and control the movement of people. Around 1,700 people, including villagers abducted or coerced into volunteering, were charged with transporting weapons, medical supplies, food and clothing. Rest stops were set up along the route of the march to Beni. Thousands of cattle had been caravanned from all over western Nepal to feed the troops, while large quantities of medical supplies were smuggled from across the Indian border. The non-combatant volunteers would participate in the attack, carrying arms and medical supplies, providing first-aid and carrying the wounded out of the fighting area.

The Maoists left Lukum on 13 March, after a ceremony which included song and dance and speeches from the commanders. A letter from the then supreme commander of PLA and General Secretary of the Maoist Party, Pushpa Kamal Dahal (Prachanda), was read. The caravan of PLA fighters, Maoist activists and civilian "volunteers" marched through days and nights, across the forests, fields and snowy mountains of Dhawalagiri region, stopping for short times only at the designated rest-stops where local villagers had been "volunteered" to cook for them and provide shelter. They reached the village of Takam in Myagdi District on 17 March. The local villagers agreed to provide whatever help they needed during their stay, but unanimously rejected the demand for "volunteers" to go to Beni, to which the Maoists agreed. On the night of 18 March, the Maoists received reports that their plan to attack Beni on 22 March might have leaked. They immediately advanced the date of attack to 20 March. They left Takam the next day.

A battalion each was sent to engage and delay possible reinforcements arriving from Kushma of Parbat and Baglung of Baglung. Another battalion of 300 fighters was sent to stop possible reinforcements from Ghumaunetal camp, a few kilometres north of Beni. A platoon of 60–70 fighters were sent to engage any patrols that may have already left the camp. The fighters from the Fourth Brigade (a battalion of 300 fighters) were sent to Pari Beni, the Beni settlements that were separated from the town by the Kali Gandaki river. They were to attack the district jail. The remaining fighters would constitute the main attack force that would go to Beni via the Darwang-Vaviyachaur-Singa-Arthunge route. As they passed Darwang, they ordered the locals to prepare meals in the early morning of 21 March to feed the fighters returning from Beni. Some fighters separated from the main attack force in Vaviyachaur to take the main road along the Myagdi River and attack the military barracks from the Mangalghat bazaar side.

The witnesses of the march to Beni reported seeing soldiers as numerous as "hairs". They appeared as though they had not taken a bath for a long time; some of them were hunting fleas on their body, some were old and walking with sticks, and around one-fifths were women.

== Attack ==
The main attack force descended from the Arthunge hills that surround the Beni Valley from the north-western side at around 9 pm on 20 March. Pasang coordinated the attack from the hills. By 10:30 pm, the forces had infiltrated the city and taken positions. Maoist fighters had broken into homes, shops and offices in the town and taken positions on the windows and the roofs. They had pulled furniture and sacks of grain from the shops and formed barricades. The group that had separated to arrive in the town through the main road along the Myagdi River reached Mangalghat bazaar to the west of the barracks around 10:45 pm. They encountered a small patrol on their way to the barracks; four patrolmen and two Maoist fighters were killed in the engagement. At 11 pm, the maoists started firing 81-mm and 2-inch mortars at the military barracks of the Shri Kali Prasad Battalion (E) in western Beni from at least three positions surrounding it. The army realised the town was under attack only after the mortars began firing. The eastern hills caught fire from the army's counterattack. After an hour of bombing, Pasang ordered the mortars to cease fire and the main attack force in the town to begin the assault. The 300 fighters who were sent to attack the district jail on the other side of the river met no resistance, as the 19 police officers on duty that night had already fled. They freed the prisoners, burned the building down, and destroyed a temple in the premises. According to a Maoist account, they had found only one hawaldar with a rifle whom they let go with the prisoners. They then went to join the main attack force across the river.

The Maoists broke into homes, shops and offices throughout the town, and set up treatment centres. Those near the frontlines were used for first-aid, and those farther from the fighting were used for surgeries, mainly extracting bullets.

According to Maoist accounts, they had taken all the posts surrounding the officers' residences located on the west side of the barracks by 2:00 am. They had captured a soldier and some weapons. Around 5:00 am, a military helicopter arrived in Beni and dropped some bombs but left after the Maoists fired at it. By 7:30 am, the Maoists had control of the city except for the barracks, with all security forces and government officers having surrendered. The Maoists burned down the DDC and DAO offices around 3:30 am. The Maoists used child soldiers during the night, per eyewitness accounts, but they were replaced with adult fighters in the morning.

== Retreat ==
A military helicopter arrived at 9:30 am and dropped ammunition for the security forces. When it came back again at 10:30 am, the Maoists decided to withdraw. They retreated in an orderly fashion, walking in a long line carrying the wounded on stretchers and dokos. They had about 40 hostages: the CDO, a DSP, two RNA soldiers and around 35 police officers. A military helicopter pursued them and dropped bombs. A police officer and half a dozen Maoist fighters died on the first day from the aerial attacks. Two more officers who were wounded were allowed to go back to Beni. Witness reports indicate that the Maoists continued their orderly retreat despite attacks.

The next morning, an army contingent sent after the retreating Maoists ambushed them in a village near Darwang, killing seven fighters. At least one more clash occurred with the pursuing RNA soldiers. The Maoists could not stop for meals and rest as planned until they reached deep within their stronghold; some fighters were seen eating uncooked rice as they walked.

== Casualties ==
The total number of deaths was 140: 14 RNA soldiers, 17 police officers, 90 Maoists fighters and 19 civilians.

According to official figures, 33 security personnel died in the attack while three were missing. Maoists claimed to have killed as many as 151 members of the security forces but the claim was found to be baseless. The army claimed that 500 Maoists had died, while the commander of the Shri Kali Prasad Battalion claimed the military had found 202 Maoist dead bodies. The Beni Red Cross which collected and buried the bodies said they counted 67. Maoists gave a precise figure of 78 deaths on their side, including two vice-commanders of Brigades, one battalion commander, one battalion vice-commander and 6 "volunteers". Identity cards recovered from dead bodies in Beni confirmed that some platoon commanders were among the dead. Some of the Maoist deaths were from friendly fire. According to official figures, 19 civilians died, including three boys between the ages of six and twelve who were killed in a nearby village by grenades left behind by the Maoists.

== Aftermath ==
The Maoists released a statement one day after the attack demanding that the government release Matrika Yadav, Suresh Ale Magar and Kiran Sharma in exchange for the hostages they had taken from Beni. The hostages were taken to Thawang; they arrived there on 5 April after a fifteen-day walk. On 6 April, they were released to the custody of International Red Cross amid a ceremony; its representatives had flown to Thawang on invitation from the Maoists.

== Legacy ==
The Maoists demonstrated that district centres were vulnerable. Their ability to coordinate a massive operation lasting months in complete secrecy showed their strength in rural western Nepal, and how poor RNA intelligence was. They also disproved suggestions that the Maoists military might had been destroyed or severely weakened by the RNA. However, their inability to breach a barracks after more than 12 hours of attack with thousands of fighters against a few hundred military personnel showed that they were far from achieving an upper hand over the RNA. The security of district headquarters were bolstered throughout the country, and the Maoists went back to ambushing security conveys along the highways.
