= Ghara, Nepal =

Ghara घार
- Village
- Location of Ghara, Nepal
- Coordinates: 28.456997°N 83.656278°E
- Country: Nepal
- Province: Gandaki Province
- District: Myagdi
- Rural Municipality: Annapurna Rural Municipality
- Elevation: 1,773 m (5,817 ft)

Population (2011)
  - Total: 2,471 (2,011)
- Time zone: UTC+5:45 (NPT)

Ghara (Nepali: घार) is a village situated in Annapurna Rural Municipality, Nepal, in the north part of the Myagdi district. It is surrounded by similar villages such as: Khibang, Ghorepani, Phalate, Shikha, Swata and Paudwar.

It is connected to the district headquarters in Beni Bazar, approximately 90 km NW from Pokhara, by a rough agricultural road. The village consists of rustic houses with stone walls and roofs. It is part of the Annapurna trekking trail and Annapurna Circuit Trail (Ghorepani, Poon Hill, Bhurung Tatopani, Muktinath Trek).

== Demographics ==
The population of around 2500 consists mainly of the Chhetris ethnic group. The major group is Chhetries (Khadka, Baruwal, Karki, Bhandari, Khatri), and the second is Pariyar (Damaai) (Sweingman & folk musicians) Bishwokarma (Kaami), (Ironsmiths) and Sunuwar (Goldsmiths). Brahmin is present. The village covers from sea level approx 1100-1900 masl. Others are Thakali.

== Education ==
Ghara was initiated to establish a school. It was the centre of the education system gathering students from 8 villages.

The village hosts one campus affiliated to the Tribhuvan University and a secondary school, "Shree Mukti Marga Secondary School", and the three basic schools: Shree Bhuwani Basic School, Shree Pokhare Basic School, and Turture Basic School. Two child development centers help small children.

== Economy ==
The main occupation is agriculture. Some worked in the Nepalese, Indian, and British armies. Young adults emigrate for work, especially to Gulf Countries, along with Japan, Korea, and the United States. The income has become the major economic support. Few people have an opportunity to work in government as a school teacher, and few people are entrepreneurs, such as cheese production and orange orchards.

== Geography ==
The village lies below high mountain peaks: Mount Dhaulagiri (8,091 m), Dhampus peak, Nilgiri (7,061 m), and Annapurna I (8,091 m), Annapurna South (7,219 m), and Baraha Shikhar (7,654 m). The village is rich in its specific culture and traditions. This is the only village in the region whi h Aryan people inhabited.

It is rich in flora and fauna.

== Culture ==
The village has Narsingha Bhagawan Temple on the top of the Village and Mahadev Temple in the bottom of the village, Another temple is Baraha Sthan GadePani for the worship of Kuldeuta by the Khadkas, Baruwals, and Bhandaries. Inside the hill of the North sits the White Bhairav temple. Another cave temple is the Siddha in Baisari. The Chhetries migration was not recorded, although before the union of the Nepal a small kingdom dates back more than 350 years.
