= Dhaulagiri (disambiguation) =

Dhaulagiri may refer to:

- Dhaulagiri (mountain range), a mountain range in Nepal
  - Dhaulagiri, main peak of the Dhaulagiri mountain range
- Dhaulagiri Zone, former administrative division
- Dhaulagiri Rural Municipality, a Gaunpalika in Myagdi District
