= Tatopani Hydropower Station =

- Location within Nepal
- Official name: Tatopani Hydropower Project
- Country: Nepal
- Coordinates: 28°31′31″N 83°39′30″E
- Purpose: Power
- Status: Operational
- Owner: Nepal Electricity Authority

Dam and spillways
- Type of dam: Gravity
- Impounds: Tatopani River

Power Station
- Coordinates: 28°32′00″N 83°40′07″E
- Commission date: 2051-12-06 BS
- Type: Run-of-the-river
- Installed capacity: 2.0 MW

Tatopani Hydropower Station (Nepali: तातोपानी जलविद्युत आयोजना) is a run-of-river hydroelectric plant located in Annapurna Rural Municipality, Myagdi-4, Tatopani, Myagdi District of Nepal. The flow from Tatopani River is used to generate 2.0 MW of electricity. The plant is owned and developed by the government-owned Nepal Electricity Authority. The plant started generating electricity since 2051-12-06 BS. The generation license will expire in 2101-11-30 BS.

The power station is connected to the national grid by a 33 kV transmission line.

It is the first hydropower project in Myagdi district.

== Events ==
- In 2016, the power plant was damaged extensively by flooding.
- In April 2020, the inlet valve burst, causing flooding of the powerhouse.

== See also ==
List of power stations in Nepal
