= Raghuganga Rural Municipality =

Raghuganga Rural Municipality रघुगंगा गाउँपालिका
- Gaunpalika
- Location in Nepal
- Coordinates: 28.401323°N 83.552192°E
- Country: Nepal
- Province: Gandaki
- District: Myagdi District

Government
  - Type: Mayor–council government
  - Mayor: Bhab Bahadur Bhandari (Nepali Congress)
  - Deputy Mayor: Prem Kumari Pun

Area
  - Total: 379 km^{2} (146 sq mi)

Population
  - Estimate (2021): 16,377
- Time zone: UTC+5:45 (Nepal Time)
- Postal code: 33200
- Area code: 069
- Website: http://raghugangamun.gov.np/

Raghuganga, officially Raghuganga Rural Municipality (Nepali :रघुगंगा गाँउपालिका) is a Gaunpalika with around 16,377 inhabitants living in 2021. It is located in Myagdi District, Gandaki Province of Nepal. On 12 March 2017, the government of Nepal implemented a new local administrative structure, with the implementation of the new local administrative structure, VDCs have been replaced with municipal and Village Councils. Raghuganga is one of these 753 local units.

== Demographics ==
At the time of the 2011 Nepal census, Raghuganga Rural Municipality had a population of 15,772. Of these, 85.1% spoke Nepali, 6.6% Magar, 5.0% Chantyal, 2.3% Kham, 0.3% Sign language, 0.2% Newar, 0.1% Maithili, 0.1% Thakali, 0.1% Tharu and 0.2% other languages as their first language.

In terms of ethnicity/caste, 38.1% were Magar, 20.0% Chhetri, 9.8% Kami, 9.2% Damai/Dholi, 7.8% Chhantyal, 5.8% Thakuri, 4.4% Hill Brahmin, 2.7% Sarki, 0.6% Newar, 0.3% Badi, 0.3% Gurung, 0.3% Thakali, 0.2% Tamang, 0.2% Tharu, 0.1% Koiri/Kushwaha, 0.1% other Terai and 0.3% others.

In terms of religion, 91.6% were Hindu, 7.1% Buddhist, 1.0% Christian and 0.3% others.

In terms of literacy, 68.4% could read and write, 2.3% could only read and 29.3% could neither read nor write.
