= Mangala Rural Municipality =

Mangala Rural Municipality मंगला गाउँपालिका
- Gaunpalika
- Location in Nepal
- Coordinates: 28.388387°N 83.453603°E
- Country: Nepal
- Province: Gandaki
- District: Myagdi District

Area
  - Total: 89 km^{2} (34 sq mi)

Population
  - Total: 16,286
  - Density: 180/km^{2} (470/sq mi)
- Time zone: UTC+5:45 (Nepal Time)
- Website: http://mangalamun.gov.np/

Mangala Rural Municipality (Nepali :मंगला गाँउपालिका) is a Gaunpalika in Myagdi District in Gandaki Province of Nepal. On 12 March 2017, the government of Nepal implemented a new local administrative structure, with the implementation of the new local administrative structure, VDCs have been replaced with municipal and Village Councils. Mangala is one of these 753 local units.

== Demographics ==
At the time of the 2011 Nepal census, Mangala Rural Municipality had a population of 16,334. Of these, 98.7% spoke Nepali, 0.8% Magar, 0.1% Chantyal, 0.1% Newar and 0.3% other languages as their first language.

In terms of ethnicity/caste, 38.0% were Magar, 15.2% Kami, 13.8% Chhetri, 13.2% Hill Brahmin, 6.4% Sarki, 4.2% Damai/Dholi, 2.4% Chhantyal, 1.9% Kisan, 1.6% Thakali, 1.2% Thakuri, 0.5% Sanyasi/Dasnami, 0.4% Newar, 0.3% Gurung, 0.2% Badi, 0.2% Tamang, 0.1% Limbu, 0.1% Majhi and 0.4% others.

In terms of religion, 84.1% were Hindu, 15.1% Buddhist and 0.7% Christian.

In terms of literacy, 70.4% could read and write, 2.8% could only read and 26.7% could neither read nor write.
