= Tikhedhunga =

Coordinates: 28°20′57″N 83°44′32″E

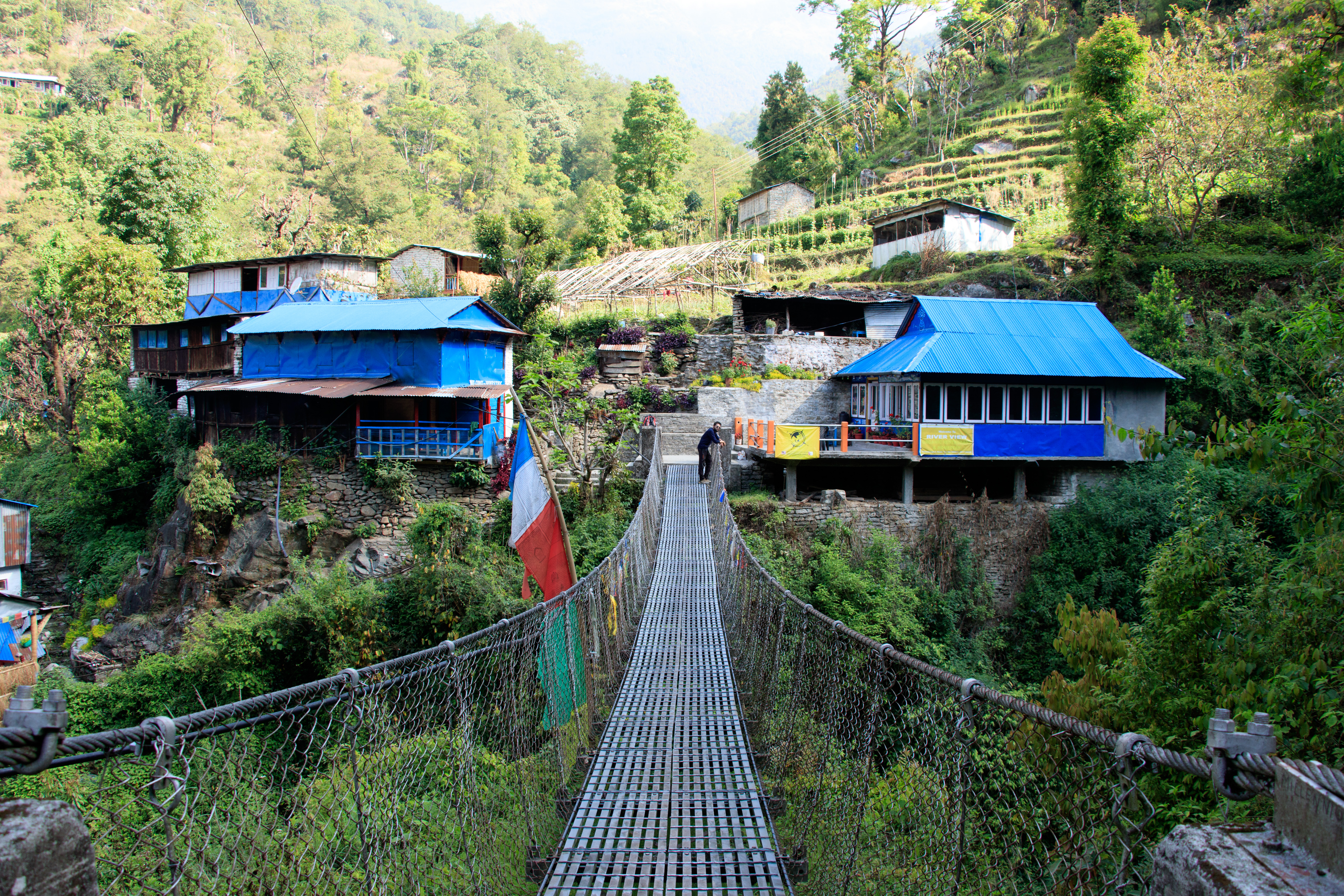
Tikhedhunga

Tikhedhunga (also spelled Tirkhedhunga) is a small hillside settlement in the Myagdi District of western Nepal. It sits at exactly 1,480 metres above sea level, beside the Modi Khola river, and lies on the main trekking route between Nayapul and Ghorepani towards Annapurna Base Camp.
