= Dagnam =

Dagnam दग्नाम
- Village development committee
- Location in Nepal Dagnam (Nepal)
- Coordinates: 28.44°N 83.54°E
- Country: Nepal
- Zone: Dhaulagiri Zone
- District: Myagdi District

Population (1991)
  - Total: 1,273
- Time zone: UTC+5:45 (Nepal Time)

Dagnam is a Pun village development committee in Myagdi District in the Dhaulagiri Zone of western-central Nepal. At the time of the 1991 Nepal census it had a population of 1273 people living in 286 individual households.
