= Dhaulagiri Rural Municipality =

Dhaulagiri Rural Municipality धवलागिरी गाउँपालिका
- Gaunpalika
- Location in Nepal
- Coordinates: 28.474543°N 83.354875°E
- Country: Nepal
- Province: Gandaki
- District: Myagdi District

Area
  - Total: 1,037 km^{2} (400 sq mi)
  - Rank: 10th (Nepal)

Population
  - Total: 14,104
  - Density: 13.60/km^{2} (35.23/sq mi)
- Time zone: UTC+5:45 (Nepal Time)
- Website: http://dhawalagirimun.gov.np/

Dhaulagiri Municipality (Nepali :धवलागिरी गाँउपालिका) is a Gaunpalika in Myagdi District in Gandaki Province of Nepal. On 12 March 2017, the government of Nepal implemented a new local administrative structure, with the implementation of the new local administrative structure, VDCs have been replaced with municipal and Village Councils. Dhaulagiri is one of these 753 local units.

== Demographics ==
At the time of the 2011 Nepal census, Dhaulagiri Rural Municipality had a population of 14,112. Of these, 94.7% spoke Nepali, 4.6% Kham, 0.2% Sanskrit, 0.2% Sign language, 0.1% Chantyal and 0.2% other languages as their first language.

In terms of ethnicity/caste, 33.6% were Magar, 30.9% Kami, 12.9% Chhetri, 9.8% Chhantyal, 5.0% Hill Brahmin, 1.9% Damai/Dholi, 1.9% Gurung, 1.3% Thakuri, 1.1% other Dalit, 0.6% Sarki, 0.6% Thakali, 0.1% Gharti/Bhujel, 0.1% Pattharkatta/Kushwadiya and 0.3% others.

In terms of religion, 94.0% were Hindu, 4.0% Buddhist, 1.8% Christian, 0.1% Prakriti and 0.1% others.

In terms of literacy, 63.6% could read and write, 3.9% could only read and 32.4% could neither read nor write.

== Population ==
According to the National Census, the total population of Dhawalagiri Rural Municipality is 12,616 and there are 3,176 households.
