= Shikha, Nepal =

Shikha, Nepal शिख
- Village development committee
- Location in Nepal Shikha, Nepal (Nepal)
- Coordinates: 28.46°N 83.71°E
- Country: Nepal
- Zone: Dhaulagiri Zone
- District: Myagdi District

Population (1991)
  - Total: 5,862
- Time zone: UTC+5:45 (Nepal Time)

Shikha is a village development committee in Myagdi District in the Dhaulagiri Zone of western-central Nepal. At the time of the 1991 Nepal census it had a population of 5862 people living in 1350 individual households.

The VDC includes the village of Ghorepani, a popular stop for trekkers on the Annapurna Circuit trek, and the Pun Hill (Poon Hill) viewpoint.
