= Dowa =

Dowa or dōwa may refer to:

- Dowa, Malawi, a town located in the Central Region of Malawi.
- Dowa District in Malawi.
  - The Dowa meteorite of 1976, see meteorite falls.
- Dowa, Nepal, a village development committee in Myagdi District in the Dhawalagiri Zone of western-central Nepal.
- Burakumin, a social outcast group in Japan.
- Wagner DOWA 81, a Homebuilt aircraft.
- Dowa Automobile Company, a historical manufacturer of automobiles, trucks and armored cars.
- DOWA Holdings, a Japanese nonferrous metals manufacturer.
- DOWA-IBI Group, part of the IBI Group of architectural and engineering firms.
