= Pakhapani =

Pakhapani may refer to the following places in Nepal:

- Pakhapani, Parbat, in Parbat District, Dhawalagiri Zone
- Pakhapani, Myagdi, in Myagdi District, Dhawalagiri Zone
- Pakhapani, Rapti, in Rolpa District, Rapti Zone
