= Begkhola =

Begkhola बेगखोला
- Village development committee
- Interactive map of Begkhola
- Country: Nepal
- Zone: Dhaulagiri Zone
- District: Myagdi District

Population (1991)
  - Total: 1,770
- Time zone: UTC+5:45 (Nepal Time)

Begkhola is a Pun village development committee in Myagdi District in the Dhaulagiri Zone of western-central Nepal. At the time of the 1991 Nepal census it had a population of 1770 people living in 377 individual households.
