= Rumaga =

Coordinates: 28°23′N 83°20′E

Rumaga रुमागा
- Village development committee
- Location in Nepal Rumaga (Nepal)
- Country: Nepal
- Zone: Dhaulagiri Zone
- District: Myagdi District

Population (1991)
  - Total: 4,612
- Time zone: UTC+5:45 (Nepal Time)

Rumaga is a village development committee in Myagdi District in the Dhawalagiri Zone of western-central Nepal. At the time of the 1991 Nepal census it had a population of 4612 people living in 873 individual households.
