= Malika Rural Municipality, Myagdi =

Malika Rural Municipality मालिका गाउँपालिका
- Gaunpalika
- Location in Nepal Malika Rural Municipality (Nepal)
- Coordinates: 28.412797°N 83.384895°E
- Country: Nepal
- Province: Gandaki
- District: Myagdi District

Area
  - Total: 147 km^{2} (57 sq mi)

Population
  - Total: 19,458
  - Density: 132/km^{2} (343/sq mi)
- Time zone: UTC+5:45 (Nepal Time)
- Website: http://malikamunmyagdi.gov.np/

Malika Rural Municipality (Nepali :मंगला गाँउपालिका) is a Gaunpalika in Myagdi District in Gandaki Province of Nepal. On 12 March 2017, the government of Nepal implemented a new local administrative structure, with the implementation of the new local administrative structure, VDCs have been replaced with municipal and Village Councils. Malika is one of these 753 local units.

== Demographics ==
At the time of the 2011 Nepal census, Malika Rural Municipality had a population of 19,208. Of these, 98.4% spoke Nepali, 1.4% Magar and 0.3% other languages as their first language.

In terms of ethnicity/caste, 57.6% were Magar, 26.9% Kami, 4.3% Damai/Dholi, 4.0% Hill Brahmin, 2.2% Chhetri, 1.3% Gurung, 0.7% Chhantyal, 0.7% Thakali, 0.6% Kisan, 0.5% Sarki, 0.5% Thakuri, 0.2% Newar, 0.1% Musalman, 0.1% Tamang and 0.3% others.

In terms of religion, 75.9% were Hindu, 21.6% Buddhist, 2.2% Christian, 0.1% Muslim, 0.1% Prakriti and 0.1% others.

In terms of literacy, 70.2% could read and write, 1.7% could only read and 28.0% could neither read nor write.
