= Babiyachaur =

Babiyachaur refers to the following places in Nepal:

- Babiyachaur, Myagdi
- Babiyachaur, Surkhet
