= Gurja Khani =

Gurja Khani गुर्जा खानी
- Village development committee
- Location in Nepal Gurja Khani (Nepal)
- Coordinates: 28.64°N 83.20°E
- Country: Nepal
- Zone: Dhaulagiri Zone
- District: Myagdi District

Population (1991)
  - Total: 874
- Time zone: UTC+5:45 (Nepal Time)

Gurja Khani is a village development committee in Myagdi District in the Dhaulagiri Zone of western-central Nepal. At the time of the 1991 Nepal census it had a population of 874 people living in 160 individual households. It is one of the many villages in Myadgi district predominantly inhabited by Chhantyal people.
