= Khungkhani, Baglung =

Coordinates: 28°26′N 83°15′E

Khungkhani खुङखानी
- Village development committee
- Location in Nepal Khungkhani (Nepal)
- Country: Nepal
- Zone: Dhaulagiri Zone
- District: Baglung District

Population (1991)
  - Total: 1,908
  - Religions: Hindu
- Time zone: UTC+5:45 (Nepal Time)

Khungkhani is a village development committee in Baglung District in the Dhaulagiri Zone of central Nepal. At the time of the 1991 Nepal census it had a population of 1,908 and had 397 houses in the village. Chhantyal, Dalits and Magar are the three ethnic groups living in the VDC.
