= Ramche =

Ramche may refer to:

- Ramche, Myagdi, Nepal
- Ramche, Rasuwa, Nepal
- Ramche, Sindhupalchok, Nepal
