= Kuhunkot =

Coordinates: 28°24′N 83°28′E

Kuhunkot कुहुनकोट
- Village development committee
- Location in Nepal Kuhunkot (Nepal)
- Country: Nepal
- Zone: Dhaulagiri Zone
- District: Myagdi District

Population (1991)
  - Total: 3,311
- Time zone: UTC+5:45 (Nepal Time)

Kuhunkot is a village development committee in Myagdi District in the Gandaki Province of Nepal. At the time of the 1991 Nepal census it had a population of 3311 people living in 668 individual households.
