= Histhan Mandali =

Histhan Mandali हिस्तान मण्डली
- Village development committee
- Location in Nepal Histhan Mandali (Nepal)
- Coordinates: 28.42°N 83.63°E
- Country: Nepal
- Zone: Dhaulagiri Zone
- District: Myagdi District

Population (1991)
  - Total: 2,206
- Time zone: UTC+5:45 (Nepal Time)

Histhan Mandali is a village development committee in Myagdi District in the Dhaulagiri Zone of western-central Nepal. At the time of the 1991 Nepal census it had a population of 2206 people living in 514 individual households. Histhan Mandali most tourist spot in Myagdi District
