= Kuinemangale =

Kuinemangale कुइनेमंगले
- Village development committee
- Location in Nepal Kuinemangale (Nepal)
- Coordinates: 28.5053611111111°N 83.5195472222222°E
- Country: Nepal
- Zone: Dhaulagiri Zone
- District: Myagdi District

Population (1991)
  - Total: 1,650
- Time zone: UTC+5:45 (Nepal Time)

Kuinemangale is a village development committee in Myagdi District in the Dhaulagiri Zone of western-central Nepal. At the time of the 1991 Nepal census it had a population of 1650 people living in 290 individual households.
