= Ghatan =

Ghatan घतान
- Location in Nepal Ghatan (Nepal)
- Coordinates: 28.38°N 83.55°E
- Country: Nepal
- Zone: Dhaulagiri Zone
- District: Myagdi District

Population (1991)
  - Total: 3,475
- Time zone: UTC+5:45 (Nepal Time)

Ghatan is a market center in Beni Municipality in Myagdi District in the Dhaulagiri Zone of western-central Nepal. The former village development committee was annexed to form the new municipality on 18 May 2014. At the 2011 census, it had 1,137 households and a population of 4,327.

Galeshwor temple which is a popular, religious and historically unique is also located at Ghatan and is also the pilgrimage route to the Hindu sacred site Muktinath.Ghatan consists of various caste but a unique surname which is originated from Dholthan Ghatan itself is Chokhal or also called Chokhyal.

Ghatan is the location of the "Big Pine Forest". Ghatan is also famous for its 'TIMMUR' The 75 hectare (185 acre) forest is managed collaboratively by the people of Ghatan village.
