= Chimkhola =

Chimkhola चीमखोला
- Village development committee
- Location in Nepal Chimkhola (Nepal)
- Coordinates: 28.51°N 83.55°E
- Country: Nepal
- Province: Gandaki Province
- District: Myagdi District

Population (1991)
  - Total: 1,456
- Time zone: UTC+5:45 (Nepal Time)

Chimkhola (Nepali: चीमखोला) is a village in Myagdi District in Gandaki Province of western-central Nepal. At the time of the 1991 Nepal census it had a population of 1456 people living in 270 individual households.
