= Lulang =

Lulang लुलाङ
- Village development committee
- Location in Nepal Lulang (Nepal)
- Coordinates: 28.53°N 83.22°E
- Country: Nepal
- Zone: Dhaulagiri Zone
- District: Myagdi District

Population (1991)
  - Total: 1,158
- Time zone: UTC+5:45 (Nepal Time)

Lulang is a village development committee in Myagdi District in the Dhaulagiri Zone of western-central Nepal. At the time of the 1991 Nepal census it had a population of 1158 people living in 222 individual households.
