= Devisthan, Myagdi =

Coordinates: 28°28′N 83°21′E

Devisthan, Myagdi Beni
- Village development committee
- Location in Nepal Devisthan, Myagdi (Nepal)
- Country: Nepal
- Zone: Dhaulagiri Zone
- District: Myagdi District

Population (1991)
  - Total: 3,225
- Time zone: UTC+5:45 (Nepal Time)

Devisthan, Myagdi is a village development committee in Myagdi District in the Dhaulagiri Zone of western-central Nepal. At the time of the 1991 Nepal census it had a population of 3225 people living in 618 individual households.
