= Mudi, Nepal =

Mudi, Nepal मुडी
- Village development committee
- Location in Nepal Mudi, Nepal (Nepal)
- Coordinates: 28.66°N 83.38°E
- Country: Nepal
- Zone: Dhaulagiri Zone
- District: Myagdi District

Population (1991)
  - Total: 2,244
- Time zone: UTC+5:45 (Nepal Time)

Mudi, Nepal is a village development committee in Myagdi District in the Dhaulagiri Zone of western-central Nepal. At the time of the 1991 Nepal census, it had a population of 2244 people living in 410 individual households.
