= Jhin =

Jhin झीन
- Village development committee
- Location in Nepal Jhin (Nepal)
- Coordinates: 28.42°N 83.51°E
- Country: Nepal
- Zone: Dhaulagiri Zone
- District: Myagdi District

Population (1991)
  - Total: 1,234
- Time zone: UTC+5:45 (Nepal Time)

Jhin is a village development committee in Myagdi District in the Dhaulagiri Zone of western-central Nepal. At the time of the 1991 Nepal census it had a population of 1234 people living in 283 individual households.
