= Baranja, Nepal =

Baranja, Nepal बरन्जा
- Village development committee
- Location in Nepal Baranja, Nepal (Nepal)
- Coordinates: 28.35°N 83.46°E
- Country: Nepal
- Zone: Dhaulagiri Zone
- District: Myagdi District

Population (1991)
  - Total: 4,576
- Time zone: UTC+5:45 (Nepal Time)

Baranja is a village development committee in Myagdi District in the Dhaulagiri Zone of western-central Nepal. At the time of the 1991 Nepal census it had a population of 4576 people living in 891 individual households.

Baranja VDC in Myagdi district was declared the first fully literate area in the district in December 2015. The announcement was made as 95.2 percent of VDC's population can now read and write. Officials announced that all children had access to school in the VDC.

Resource person at the District Education Office Krishna Lal Sapkota said a total of 3,738 people between the ages of 15 and 60 years in the VDC are literate.
