= Pakhapani, Myagdi =

Pakhapani, Myagdi पाखापानी
- Rural Municipality
- Location in Nepal Pakhapani, Myagdi (Nepal)
- Coordinates: 28.45°N 83.48°E
- Country: Nepal
- Zone: Dhaulagiri Zone
- District: Myagdi District

Population (1991)
  - Total: 2,565
- Time zone: UTC+5:45 (Nepal Time)

Pakhapani, Myagdi is a Pun village situated in Rural Municipality in Myagdi District in the Dhaulagiri Zone of western-central Nepal. At the time of the 1991 Nepal census it had a population of 2565 people living in 533 individual households.
