= Rakhupiple =

Coordinates: 28°24′N 83°34′E

Rakhupiple पिप्ले ward num = 3 Raghu ganga gau palika
- Village development committee
- Location in Nepal Rakhupiple (Nepal)
- Country: Nepal
- Zone: Dhaulagiri Zone
- District: Myagdi District

Population (1991)
  - Total: 3,538
- Time zone: UTC+5:45 (Nepal Time)

Rakhupiple is a village development committee in Myagdi District in the Dhaulagiri Zone of western-central Nepal. At the time of the 1991 Nepal census it had a population of 3538 people living in 782 individual households.
