= Malkwang =

Malkwang माल्कवाङ
- Village development committee
- Location in Nepal Malkwang (Nepal)
- Coordinates: 28.50°N 83.43°E
- Country: Nepal
- Zone: Dhaulagiri Zone
- District: Myagdi District

Population (1991)
  - Total: 1,602
- Time zone: UTC+5:45 (Nepal Time)

Malkwang is a village development committee in Myagdi District in the Dhaulagiri Zone of western-central Nepal. At the time of the 1991 Nepal census it had a population of 1602 people living in 308 individual households.
