= Rakhu Bhagawati =

Rakhu Bhagawati राकु भगवती
- Village development committee
- Location in Nepal Rakhu Bhagawati (Nepal)
- Coordinates: 28.41°N 83.59°E
- Country: Nepal
- Zone: Dhaulagiri Zone
- District: Myagdi District

Population (1991)
  - Total: 3,329
- Time zone: UTC+5:45 (Nepal Time)

Rakhu Bhagawati is a village development committee in Myagdi District in the Dhaulagiri Zone of western-central Nepal. At the time of the 1991 Nepal census it had a population of 3329 people living in 698 individual households.
