= Marang, Nepal =

Marang, Nepal माराङ
- Village development committee
- Location in Nepal Marang, Nepal (Nepal)
- Coordinates: 28.48°N 83.39°E
- Country: Nepal
- Zone: Dhaulagiri Zone
- District: Myagdi District

Population (1991)
  - Total: 1,878
- Time zone: UTC+5:45 (Nepal Time)

Marang, Nepal is a village development committee in Myagdi District in the Dhaulagiri Zone of western-central Nepal. At the time of the 1991 Nepal census it had a population of 1878 people living in 356 individual households.
