= Poon Hill =

Hill station in Pokhara, Nepal

Poon Hill पून हिल
- Viewpoint
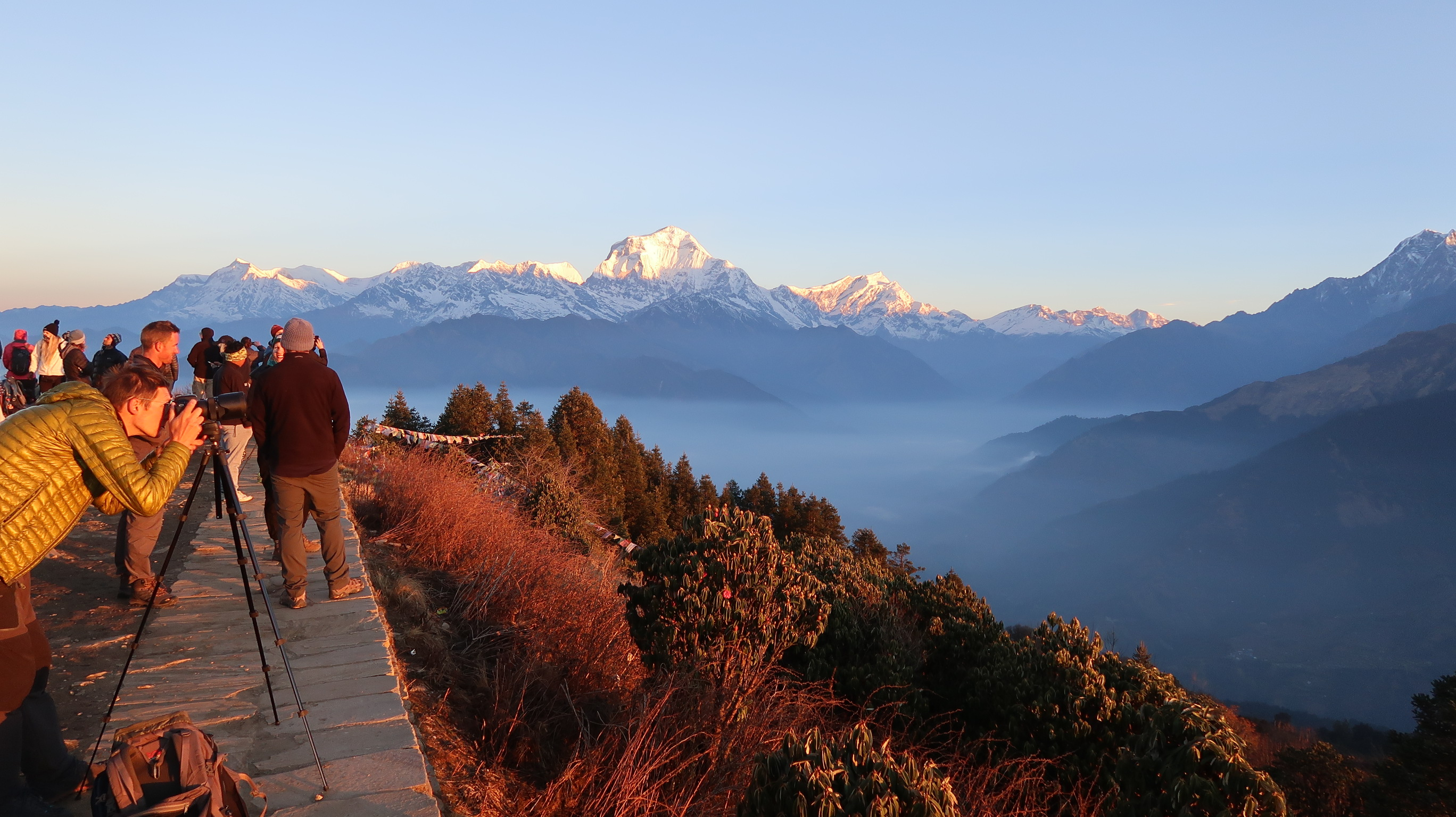
- Interactive map of Poon Hill
- Location in Nepal Poon Hill (Nepal)
- Coordinates: 28.4000425°N 83.6895402°E
- Country: Nepal
- Province: Gandaki Province
- District: Myagdi District
- Elevation: 3,210 m (10,530 ft)
- Time zone: UTC+5:45 (Nepal Time)
- Postal code: 33200

Poon Hill (पून हिल) is a hill station overlooking the Annapurna Massif and Dhaulagiri mountain ranges, located on the border of Myagdi District and Kaski District in the Gandaki Province of Nepal. This lookout is the key viewpoint in the Ghorepani Poon Hill trek. Mountains such as Annapurna, Dhaulagiri, Annapurna South, Machhapuchhare, Himchuli, Annapurna III, Dhampus peak, Dhaulagiri II, and many other tall peaks can be seen from here.

Poon Hill is located 270 km west from Kathmandu (the capital of Nepal). The hike to Poon Hill from Pokhara takes 2–3 days.

The Poon Hill viewpoint is on the way to Annapurna Sanctuary which lies in the centre of Annapurna Conservation Area. Trekkers need to obtain an ACCAP Permit from Kathmandu or Pokhara in order to complete this hike.

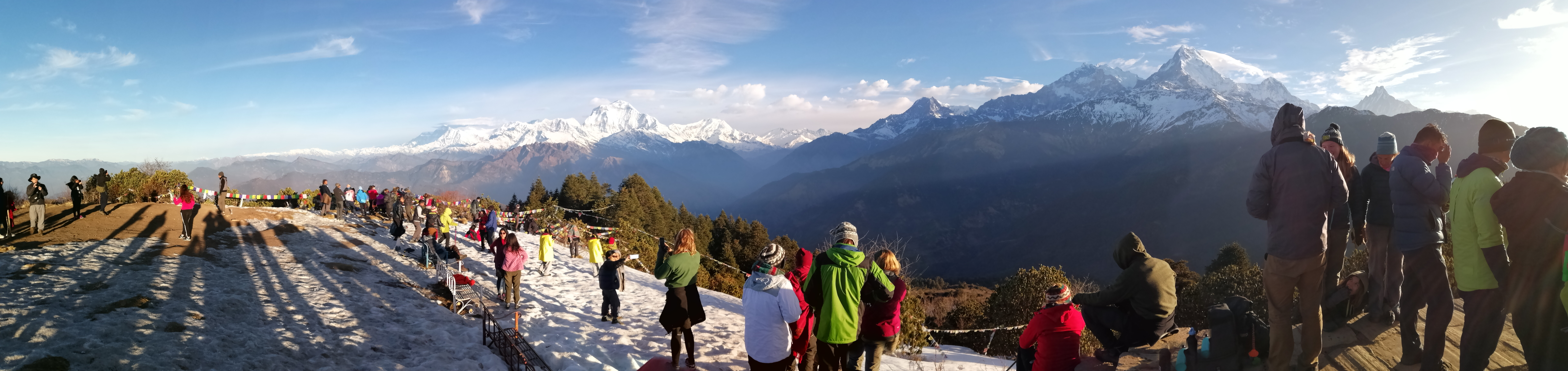
View from Poon Hill

== List of mountains visible from Poon Hill ==
Some of the peaks which are visible from the top of Poon Hill are listed below.

Peak	elevation
Dhaulagiri	8,167 m (26,795 ft)
Annapurna I	8,091 m (26,545 ft)
Annapurna South	7,219 m (23,684 ft)
Machapuchare	6,993 m (22,943 ft)
Annapurna II	7,937 m (26,040 ft)
Annapurna III	7,555 m (24,787 ft)
Gangapurna	7,455 m (24,459 ft)
Tukuche Peak	6,920 m (22,700 ft)
Dhampus Peak	6,012 m (19,724 ft)
Hiunchuli	6,441 m (21,132 ft)
Gurja Himal	7,193 m (23,599 ft)
Nilgiri Himal	7,061 m (23,166 ft)

== Gallery ==
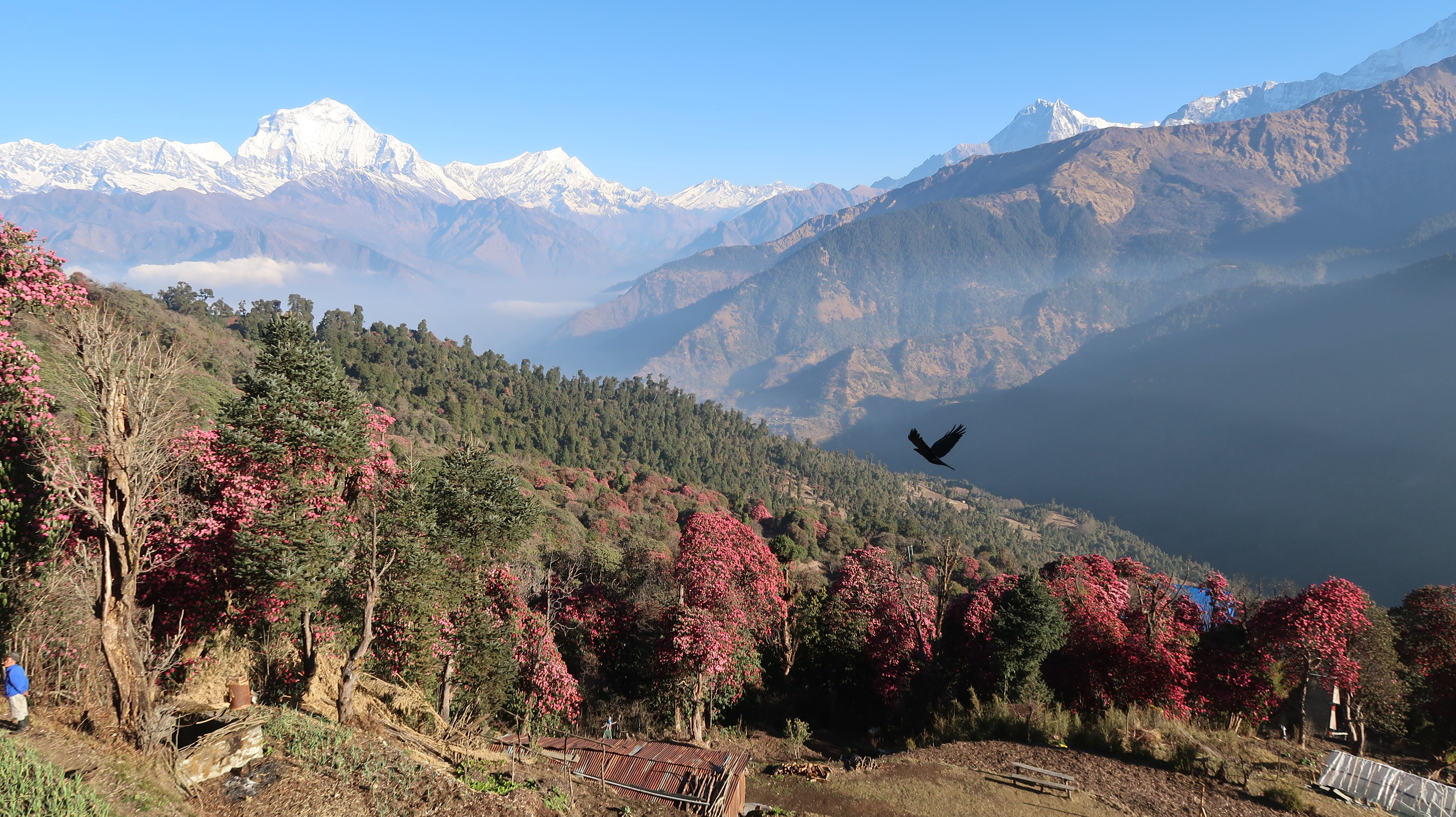
View from Sunny Hotel

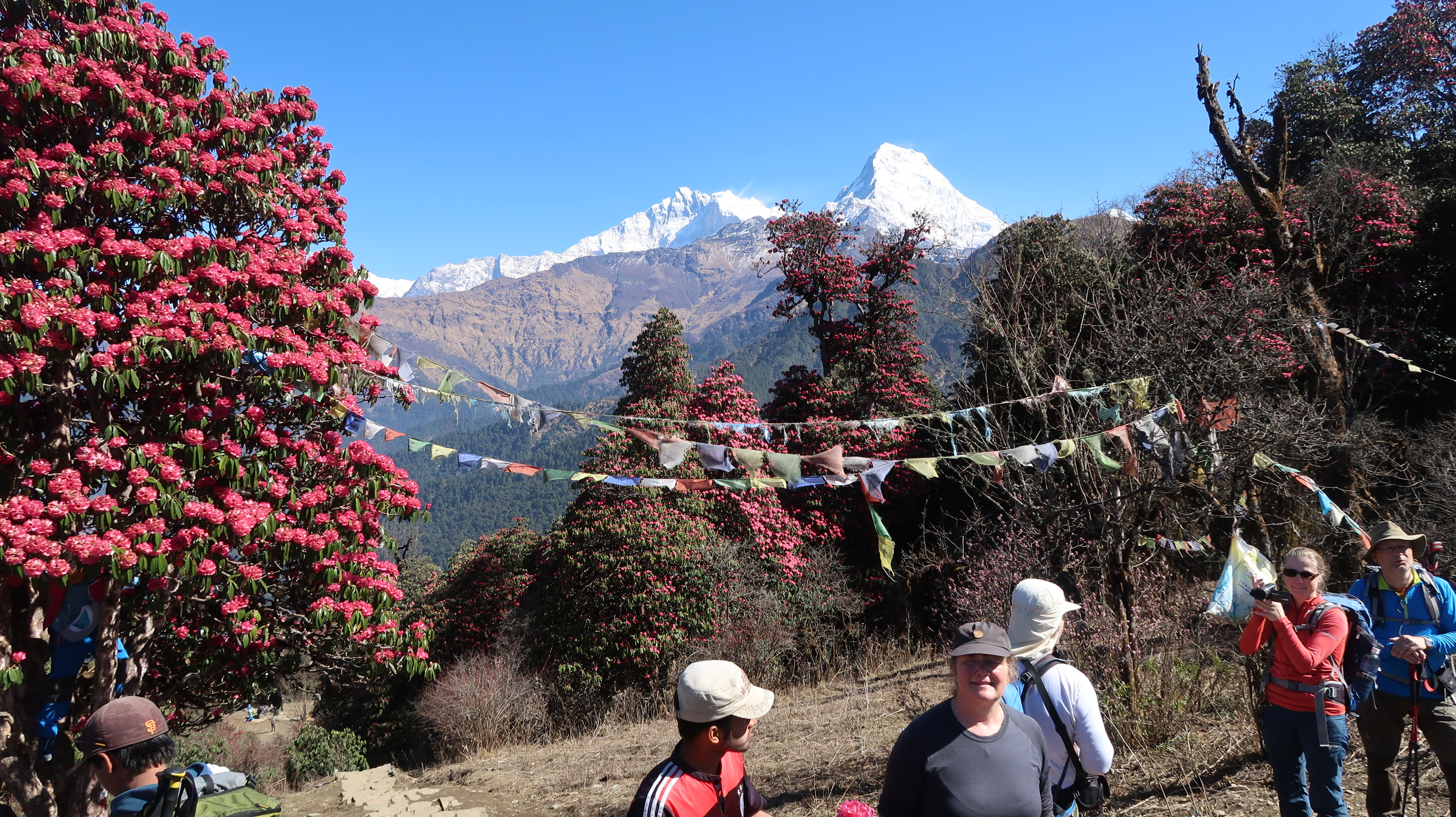
On the way to Tadapani

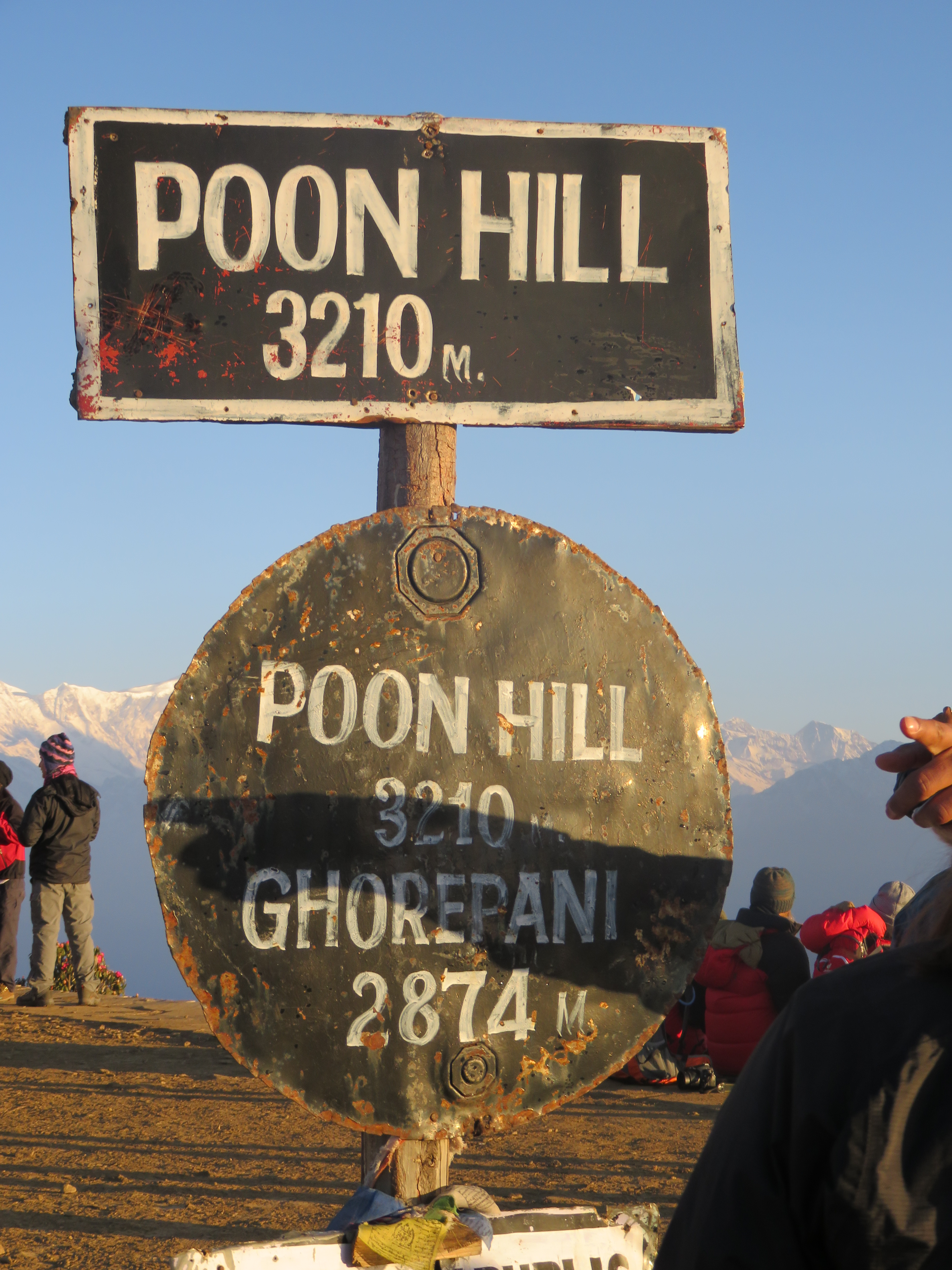
Poon Hill board

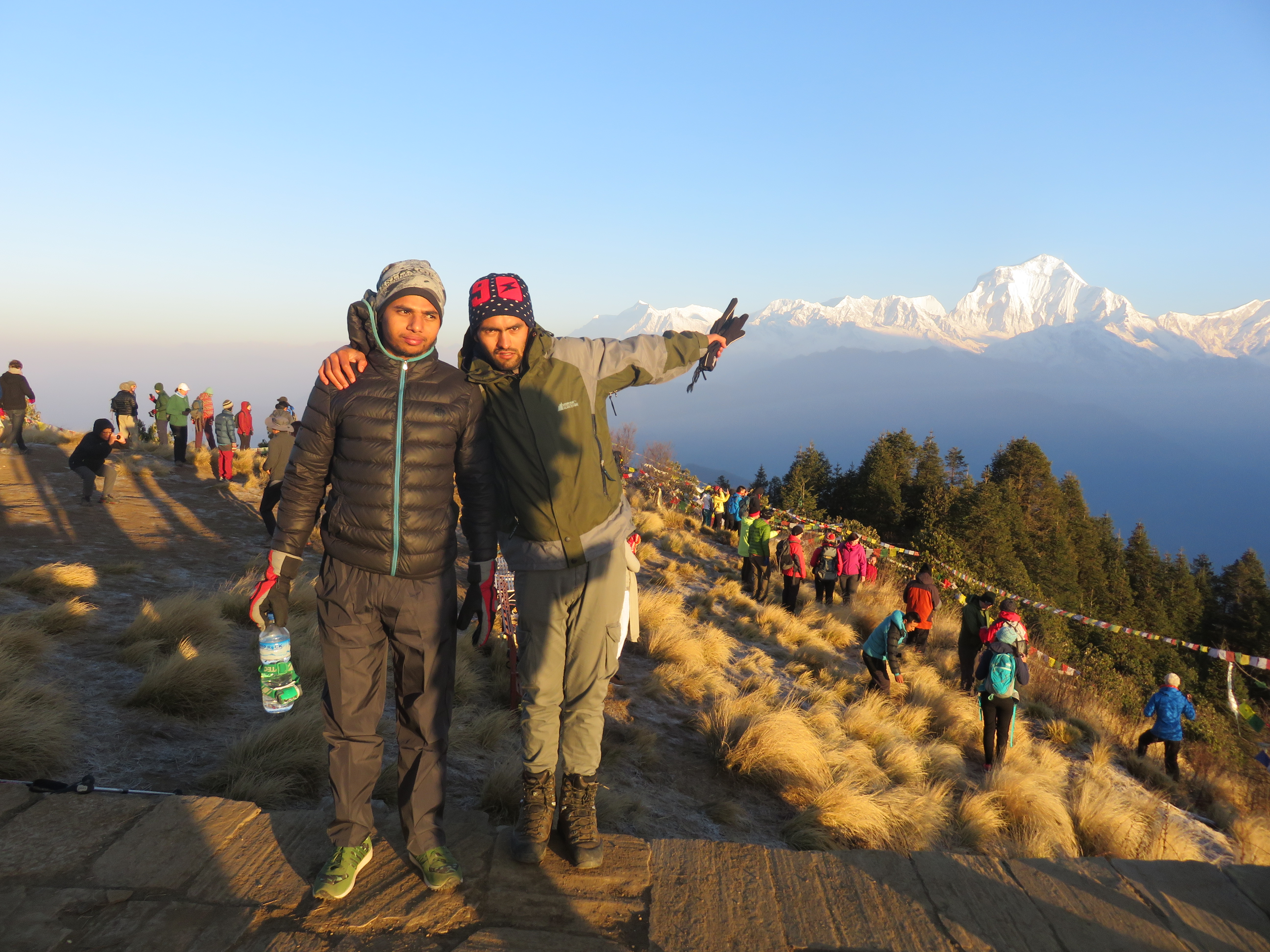
Excited man pointing at a mountain

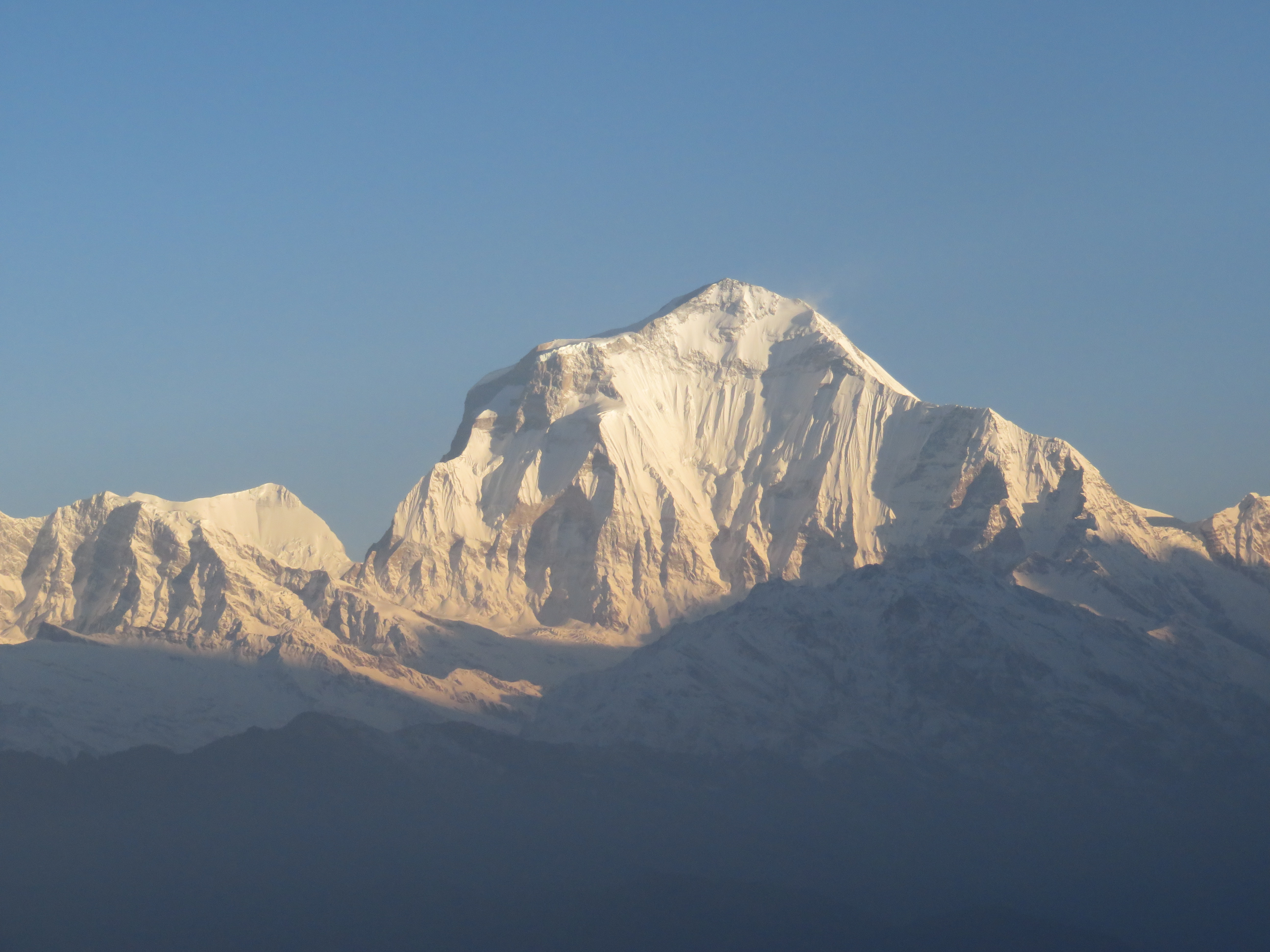
Dhaulagiri

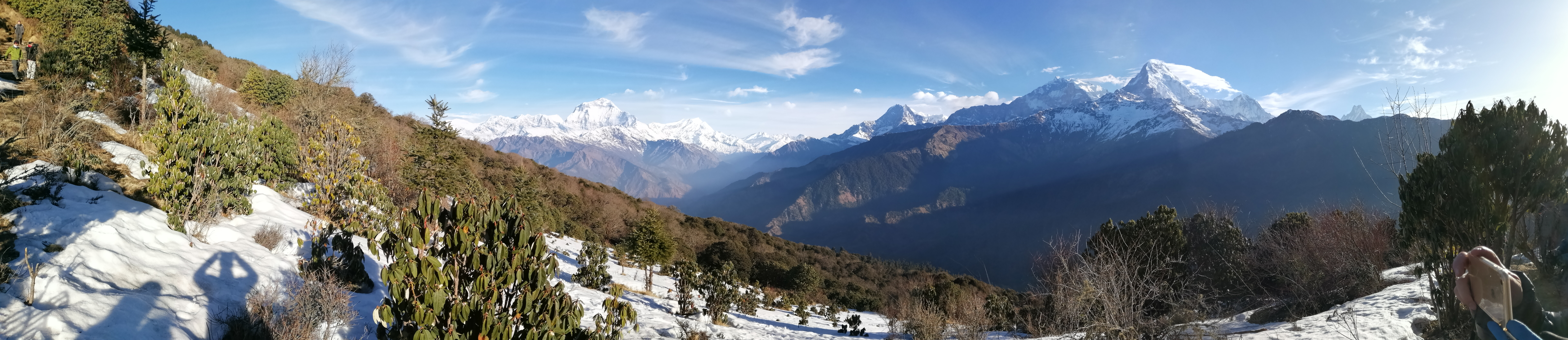
Panorama from Poon Hill

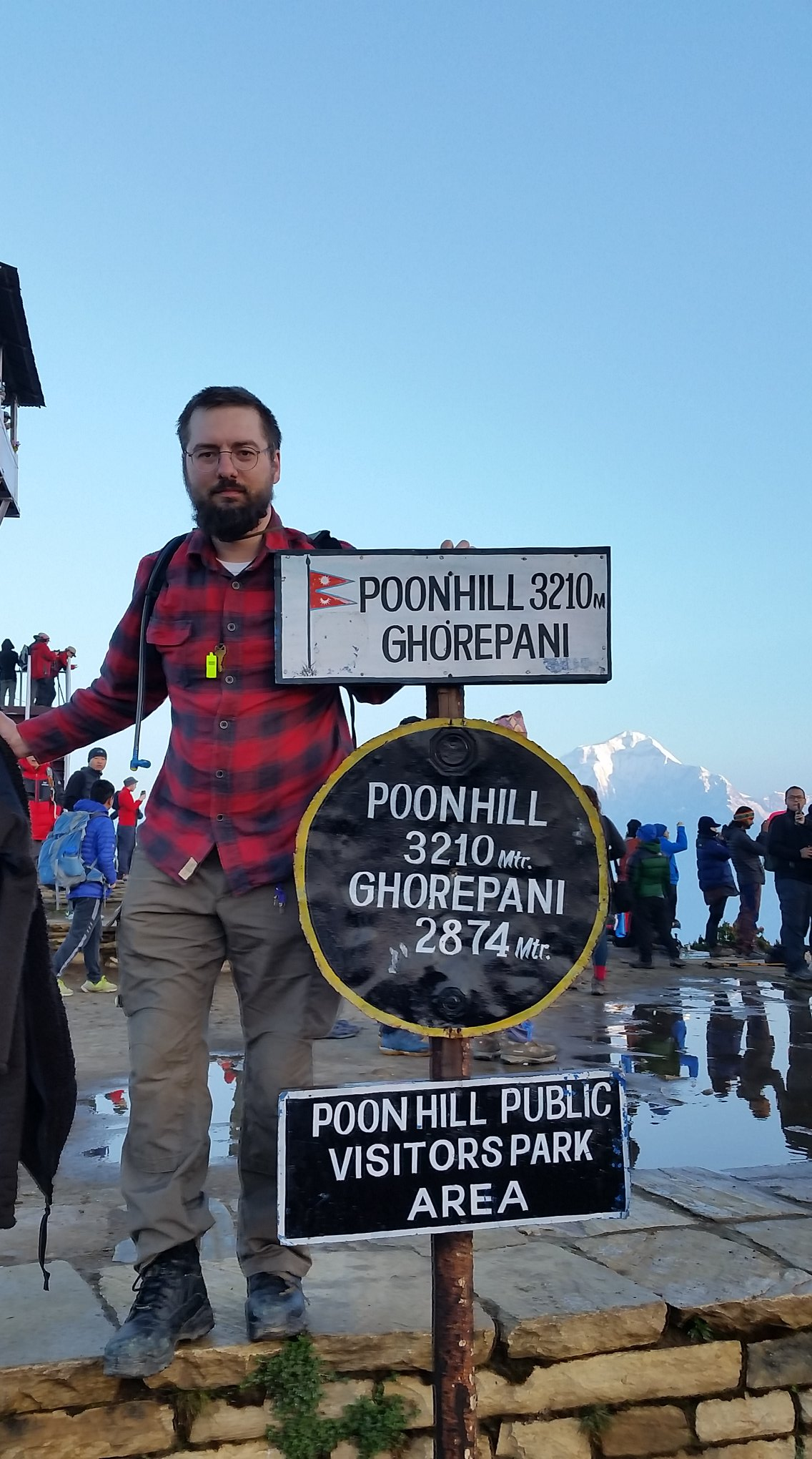
Dawn at Poon Hill station
