= Dowa, Nepal =

Dowa, Nepal दोवा
- Village development committee
- Location in Nepal Dowa, Nepal (Nepal)
- Coordinates: 28.47°N 83.61°E
- Country: Nepal
- Zone: Dhaulagiri Zone
- District: Myagdi District

Population (1991)
  - Total: 1,315
- Time zone: UTC+5:45 (Nepal Time)

Dowa, Nepal is a Pun village development committee in Myagdi District in the Dhaulagiri Zone of western-central Nepal. At the time of the 1991 Nepal census it had a population of 1315 people living in 319 individual households.
