= Niskot =

Niskot निसकोट
- Village development committee
- Location in Nepal Niskot (Nepal)
- Coordinates: 28.39°N 83.38°E
- Country: Nepal
- Zone: Dhaulagiri Zone
- District: Myagdi District

Population (1991)
  - Total: 1,772
- Time zone: UTC+5:45 (Nepal Time)

Niskot is a village development committee in Myagdi District in the Dhaulagiri Zone of western-central Nepal. At the time of the 1991 Nepal census it had a population of 1772 people living in 327 individual households.
