= Patlekhet =

Coordinates: 28°24′N 83°32′E

Patlekhet पातलेखेत
- Village development committee
- Location in Nepal Patlekhet (Nepal)
- Country: Nepal
- Zone: Dhaulagiri Zone
- District: Myagdi District

Population (1991)
  - Total: 1,697
- Time zone: UTC+5:45 (Nepal Time)

Patlekhet is a village development committee in Myagdi District in the Dhaulagiri Zone of western-central Nepal. At the time of the 1991 Nepal census it had a population of 1697 people living in 345 individual households.
