= Arman, Nepal =

Arman अर्मन Mangala Rural Municipality-5, Myagdi, Nepal
- Rural Municipality
- Nickname: Arman
- Location in Nepal Arman (Nepal)
- Coordinates: 28.38°N 83.41°E
- Country: Nepal
- Zone: Dhaulagiri Zone
- District: Myagdi District
- Established: 2017-01-01

Government
  - Village leader: Prem Bahadur Roka

Population (1991)
  - Total: 3,867
- Time zone: UTC+5:45 (Nepal Time)

Arman, is a small village of Mangala Rural Municipality in Myagdi District in the Dhaulagiri Zone in Gandaki Province of western-central Nepal. At the time of the 1991 Nepal census it had a population of 3867 people living in 767 individual households.
