= Arthunge =

- Village development committee
- Location in Nepal Arthunge (Nepal)
- Coordinates: 28.35°N 83.57°E
- Country: Nepal
- Zone: Dhawalagiri Zone
- District: Myagdi District

Population (1991)
  - Total: 4,166
- Time zone: UTC+5:45 (Nepal Time)

Arthunge was a village development committee in Myagdi District in the Dhawalagiri Zone of western-central Nepal. At the time of the 1991 Nepal census it had a population of 4,166 people living in 919 individual households.
