= Ranjit Pun =

Ranjit Pun, VrC
- Born: Village Pang, Piuthan, Nepal
- Parent: Ranbir Pun (father)
- Military career
- Allegiance: India
- Branch: Indian Army; 2/8 Gorkha Rifles
- Service years: 1930–?
- Rank: Subedar
- Conflicts: Indo-Pakistani War of 1947–1948
- Awards: Vir Chakra

Ranjit Pun, VrC, was a Nepalese Gorkha Subedar of the 2/8 Gorkha Rifles in the Indian Army. He was awarded the Vir Chakra on 26 January 1950 for his bravery during the 1947–1948 Indo-Pak War. Enlisted on 19 October 1930, Pun was the son of Ranbir Pun from Pang village in Piuthan, Nepal.
