= Ramche, Myagdi =

Ramche, Myagdi राम्चे
- Village development committee
- Location in Nepal Ramche, Myagdi (Nepal)
- Coordinates: 28.38°N 83.65°E
- Country: Nepal
- Zone: Dhaulagiri Zone
- District: Myagdi District

Population (1991)
  - Total: 2,028
- Time zone: UTC+5:45 (Nepal Time)

Ramche is a village development committee in Myagdi District in the Dhaulagiri Zone of western-central Nepal. At the time of the 1991 Nepal census it had a population of 2028 people living in 416 individual households.
