= Lalbahadur Pun =

Pioneering Gurkha officer in the British Army (1937–2026)

Lalbahadur Pun OBE, MC
- Born: November 17, 1937; Myagdi, Nepal
- Died: January 9, 2026 (aged 88); Kathmandu, Nepal
- Spouse: Sara Pun
- Relatives: Honorary Captain Tikajit Pun MBE OBI IDSM (father)
- Military career
- Allegiance: United Kingdom; Brunei
- Branch: British Army; Gurkha Reserve Unit
- Service years: 1959–2000
- Rank: Lieutenant Colonel
- Unit: 2nd Gurkha Rifles
- Commands: Brigade of Gurkhas Training Depot, Hong Kong (1979–1981)
- Conflicts: Indonesia–Malaysia confrontation
- Awards: OBE (Mil), Military Cross

Lieutenant Colonel Lalbahadur Pun OBE MC (1937–2026) was a Nepalese Gurkha officer in the British Army. He was the first Nepalese and Sandhurst-commissioned Gurkha officer to achieve the rank of Lieutenant-Colonel, which was the highest rank attained by a Gurkha officer in the 200-year history of the Brigade of Gurkhas. In 1969, he also became the first Gurkha officer to attend the Staff College, Camberley.

Pun served in the 2nd King Edward VII's Own Gurkha Rifles (The Sirmoor Rifles) and was commissioned in 1959. In 1965, while commanding 'D' Company, he led a successful attack on an Indonesian camp during the Borneo Confrontation, for which he was awarded the Military Cross (MC). He later served as the Commandant of the Training Depot Brigade of Gurkhas in Hong Kong from 1979 to 1981 and was appointed an Officer of the Order of the British Empire (OBE) in the Queen Elizabeth II's 1981 Birthday Honours. Following his British Army career, he served as a Battalion Commander in the Gurkha Reserve Unit (GRU) in Brunei.

Born in the village of Shikha in the Myagdi District of Nepal, he was the son of Honorary Captain Tikajit Pun (MBE, OBI, IDSM), a highly distinguished Chindit veteran of the 2nd Gurkhas.
