= Tatopani, Myagdi =

Coordinates: 28°30′N 83°38′E

Bhurung Tatopani, Myagdi भुरुङ तातोपानी Hot Spring
- Village development committee
- Nickname: भुरुङ तातोपानी
- Location in Nepal Bhurung Tatopani, Myagdi (Nepal)
- Country: Nepal
- Zone: Dhaulagiri Zone
- District: Myagdi District

Government
  - Mayor: Surat KC

Population (1991)
  - Total: 843
- Time zone: UTC+5:45 (Nepal Time)

Bhurung Tatopani is a village development committee in Myagdi District in the Dhaulagiri Zone of western-central Nepal. At the time of the 1991 Nepal census it had a population of 843 people living in 182 individual households. Singa Tatopani Kunda in Myagdi district is known as a natural remedy. There is a belief that if you take regular bath in a pool of hot water of 50 degree Celsius for a week, you will be cured of diseases like joint, skin, gastritis, nerves, bath, back pain, limb swelling, stomach swelling and goiter. The water in the pool smells like birch bark.

There are three small and big tanks in the tank area. Three hundred people can dive into the pool at a time. Five hundred to one thousand people have been bathing in the pool daily. It is especially crowded from September to April. You have to pay Rs 150 for a bath. To reach Kunda, one can travel by car at a distance of nine kilometers from Beni, the district headquarters of Myagdi, while it is 297 kilometers away from Kathmandu.

== Climate ==
Climate data for Tatopani, elevation 1,243 m (4,078 ft)
Month	Jan	Feb	Mar	Apr	May	Jun	Jul	Aug	Sep	Oct	Nov	Dec	Year
Mean daily maximum °C (°F)	17.1 (62.8)	19.7 (67.5)	24.6 (76.3)	29.6 (85.3)	30.9 (87.6)	30.2 (86.4)	27.8 (82.0)	27.4 (81.3)	27.1 (80.8)	25.7 (78.3)	21.2 (70.2)	17.8 (64.0)	24.9 (76.9)
Mean daily minimum °C (°F)	6.1 (43.0)	7.1 (44.8)	11.5 (52.7)	14.4 (57.9)	16.8 (62.2)	19.3 (66.7)	19.6 (67.3)	19.5 (67.1)	18.1 (64.6)	14.6 (58.3)	9.6 (49.3)	6.4 (43.5)	13.6 (56.5)
Average precipitation mm (inches)	17.8 (0.70)	27.8 (1.09)	49.0 (1.93)	78.8 (3.10)	162.8 (6.41)	245.9 (9.68)	367.1 (14.45)	355.7 (14.00)	202.6 (7.98)	62.9 (2.48)	9.2 (0.36)	12.3 (0.48)	1,591.9 (62.66)
Source 1: Australian National University
Source 2: Japan International Cooperation Agency (precipitation)
