= Babiyachaur, Myagdi =

Babiyachaur बाबियाचौर
- Village development committee
- Location in Nepal Babiyachaur (Nepal)
- Coordinates: 28.39°N 83.46°E
- Country: Nepal
- Zone: Dhaulagiri Zone
- District: Myagdi District

Population (1991)
  - Total: 2,797
- Time zone: UTC+5:45 (Nepal Time)

Babiyachaur is a Rural municipality in Myagdi District in the Dhaulagiri Zone of western-central Nepal. At the time of the 1991 Nepal census it had a population of 2797 people living in 537 individual households.
