= Ghorepani =

Ghorepani घोरेपानी
- Village
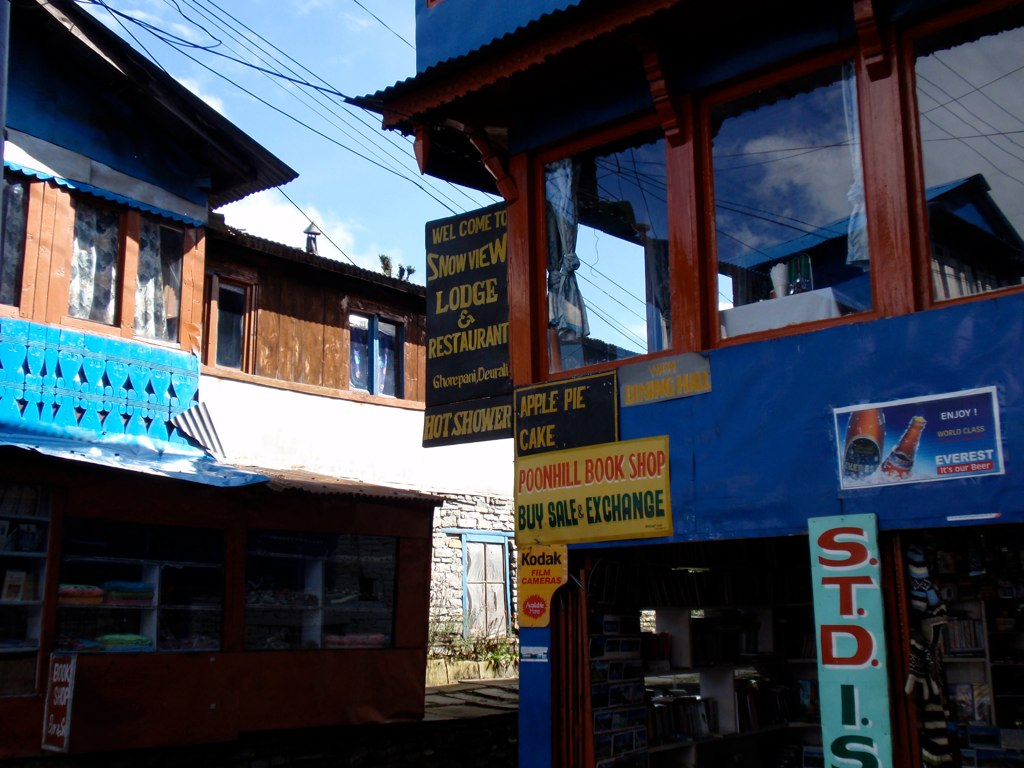
- Ghorepani

- Location in Nepal Ghorepani (Nepal)
- Coordinates: 28°23′55″N 83°41′57″E
- Country: Nepal
- Zone: Dhaulagiri Zone
- District: Myagdi District
- Elevation: 2,874 m (9,429 ft)
- Time zone: UTC+5:45 (Nepal Time)

Ghorepani is a village in Myagdi District in the Dhaulagiri Zone of northern-central Nepal. It lies 17 kilometres from the district capital of Beni at an elevation of approximately 2874 m (9429 ft). The village lies within the Annapurna Conservation Area (ACA), requiring a national park permit to visit, and contains a number of "guest houses" and tea houses that provide lodging and meals to mountain trekkers, many of whom spend the night before a pre-dawn trek to the top of nearby Poon Hill (3210m/10531 ft) to watch the sunrise.

The place used to be a rest stop where ancient traders found water (pani in Nepali) for their horses (ghora in Nepali), thus leading to the nomenclature Ghorepani. The construction of new roads has made the Ghorepani trade route unnecessary, and as such the main income source for residents of the village is now tourism.

Ghorepani lies on a major trail linking several other villages as well as the Annapurna Base Camp. From the South-East direction, it can normally be reached by foot from the village of Birethanti in about 10 hours depending on the trekker. However, many trekkers prefer to overnight at one of the lower villages on their way to Ghorepani, covering the distance over two days owing to the steepness of the trail, the increase in altitude and the beauty of the natural surroundings. Now, trekkers can reach Ulleri by bus or jeep and can reach Ghorepani by a 3-hour normal trek.From the North-West direction, Ghorepani can be reached in about 8–10 hours starting from Tatopani. This trail passes through the villages of Shikha, Dana and Chitre.

Ghorepani

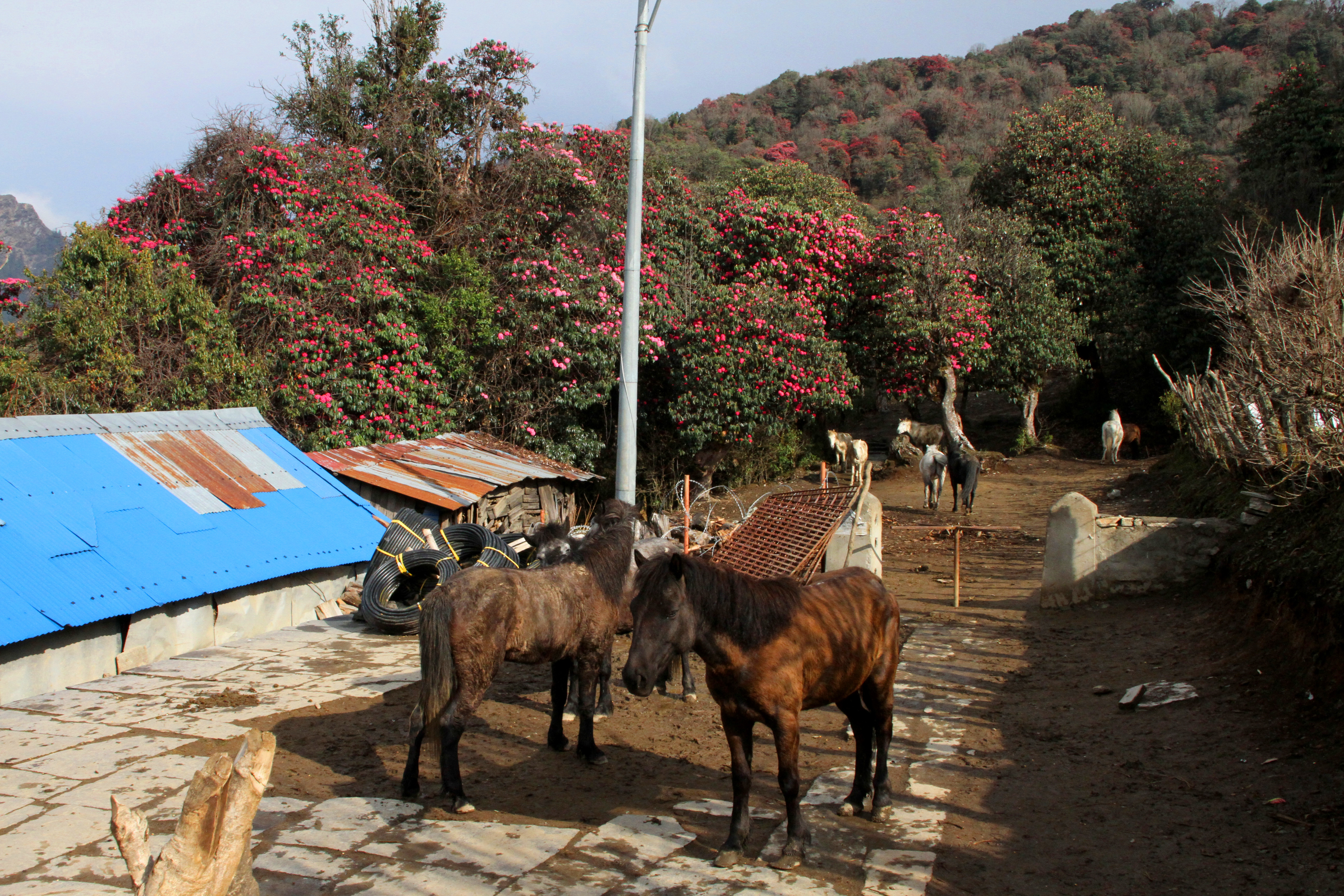
Sunny Hotel

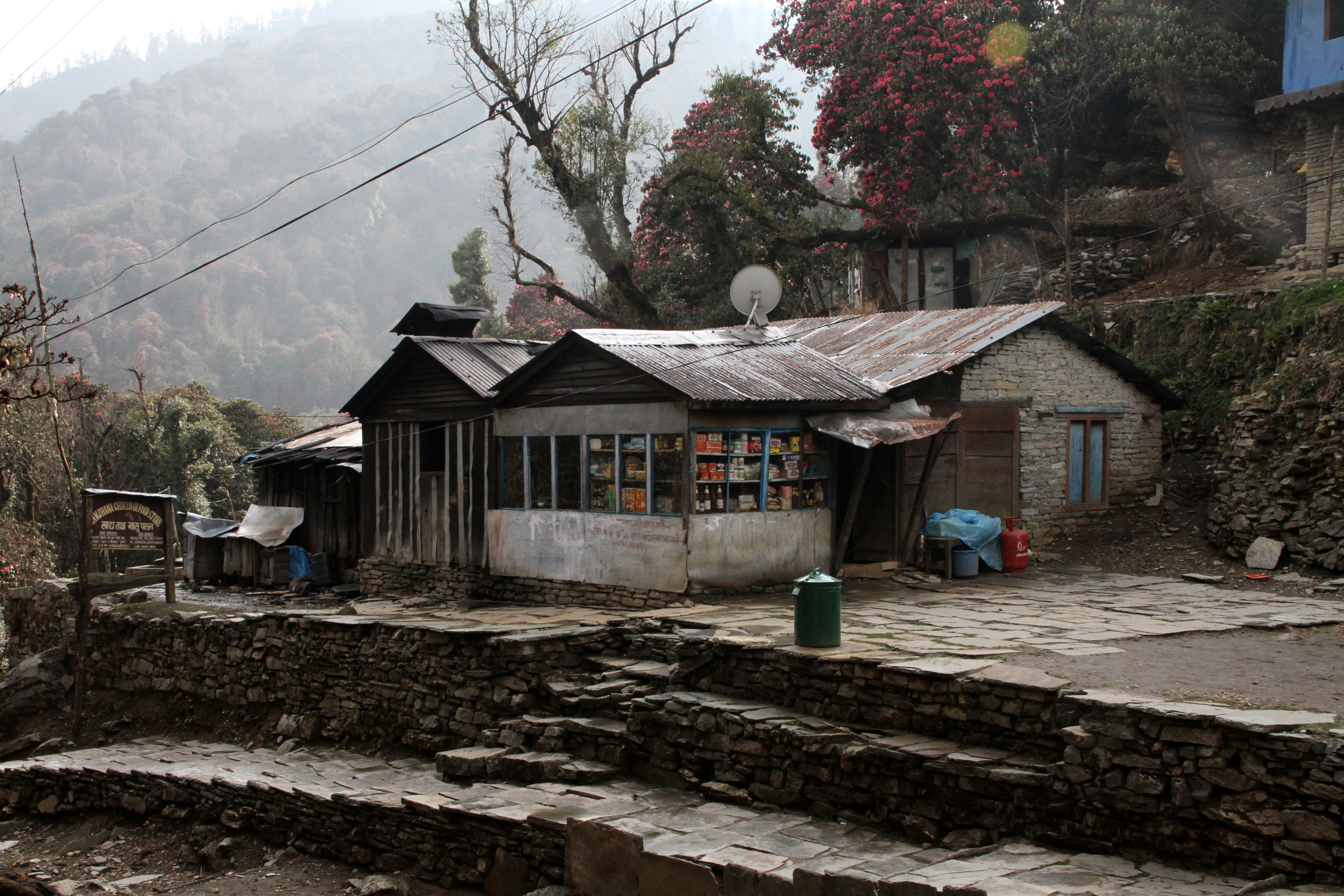
Shop

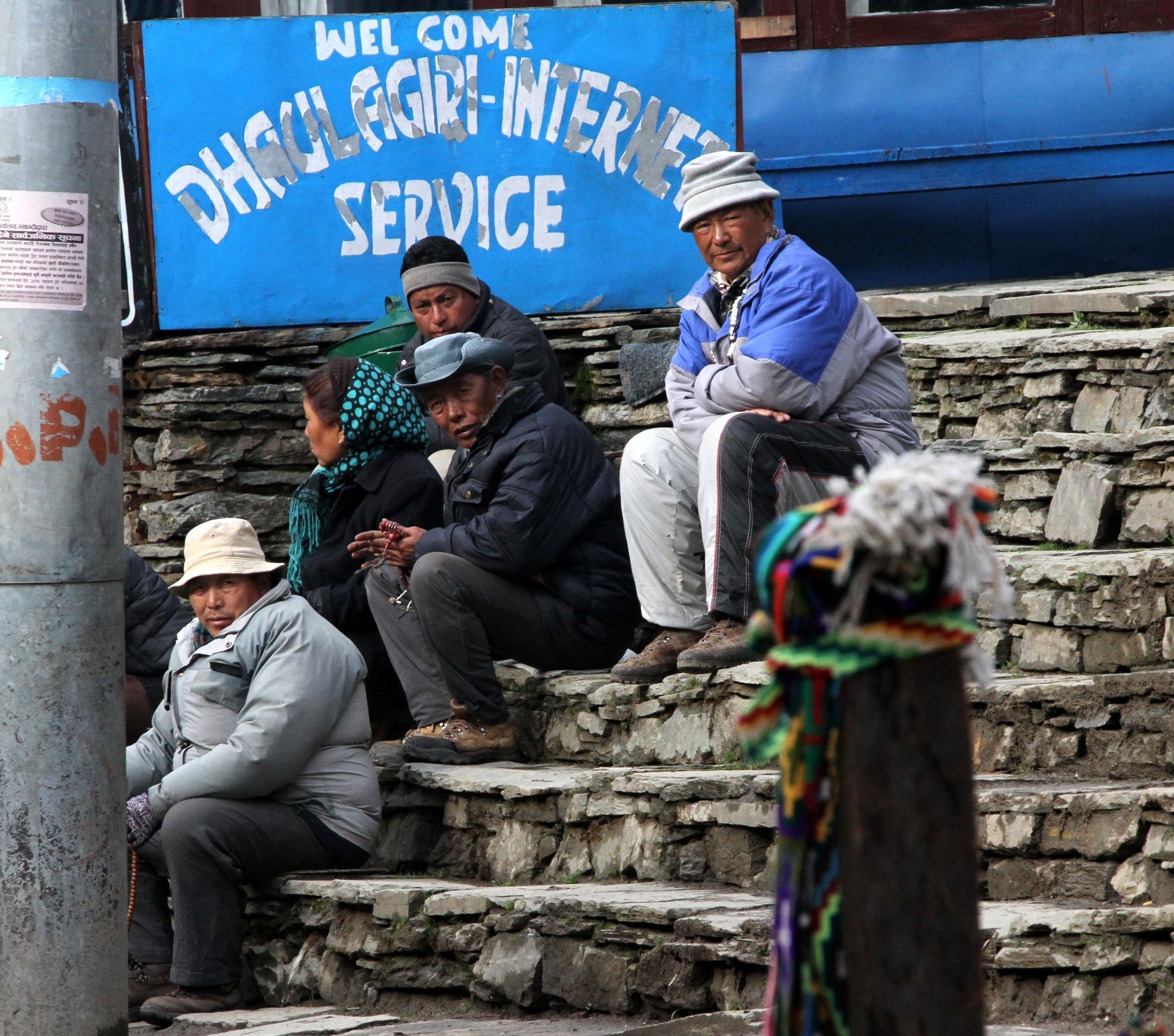
People of Ghorepani

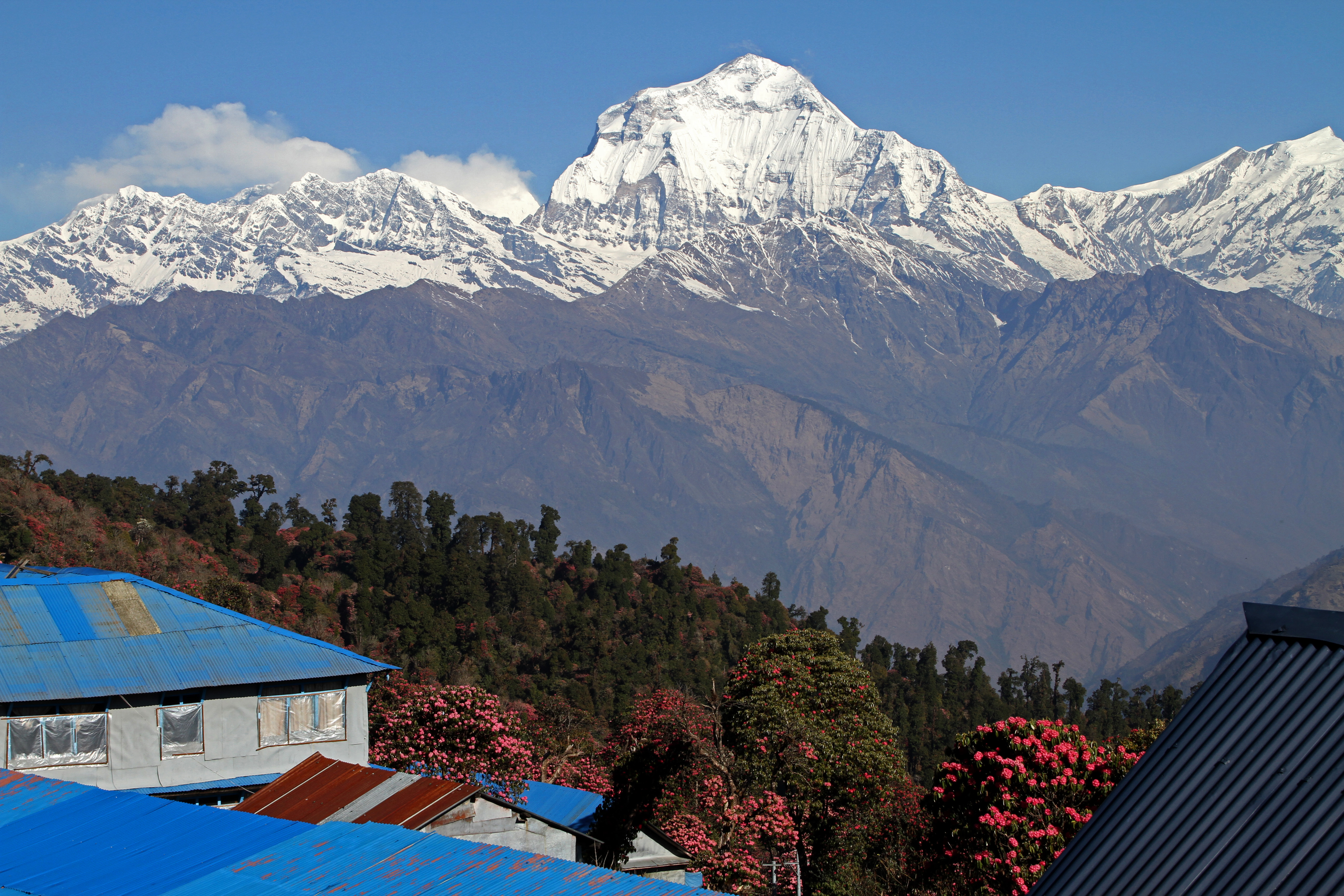
Dhaulagiri

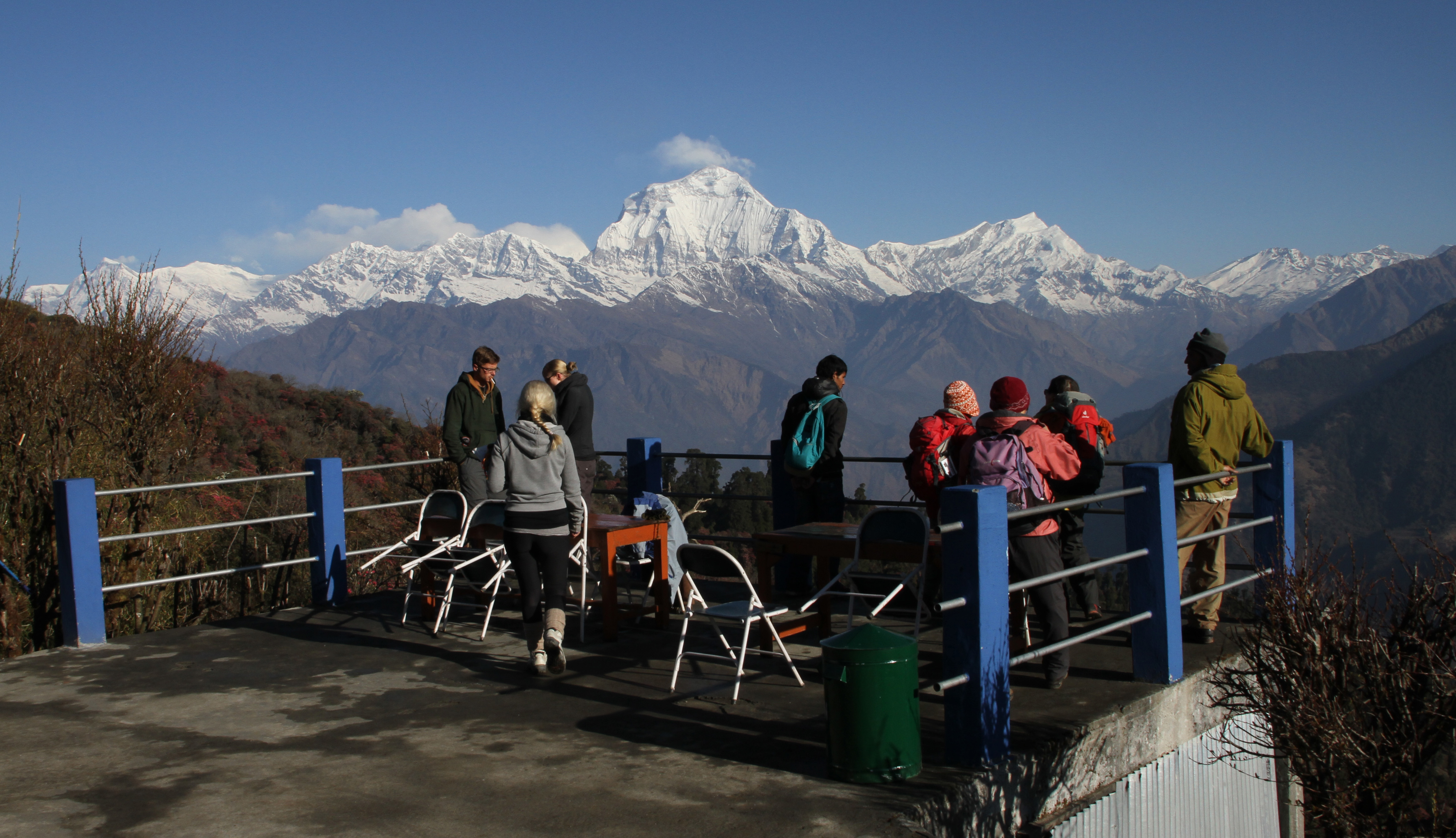
View point

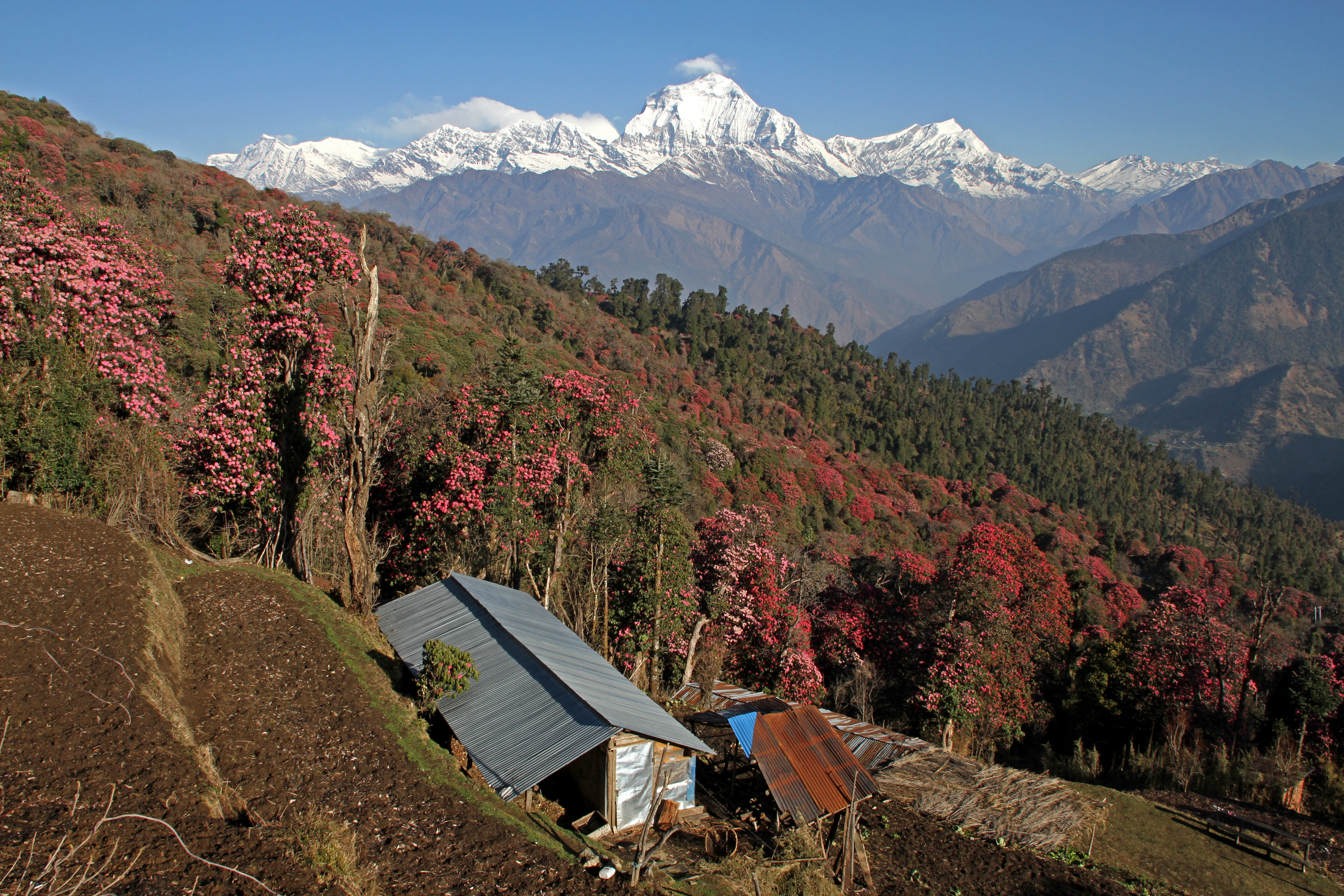
Rhododendron

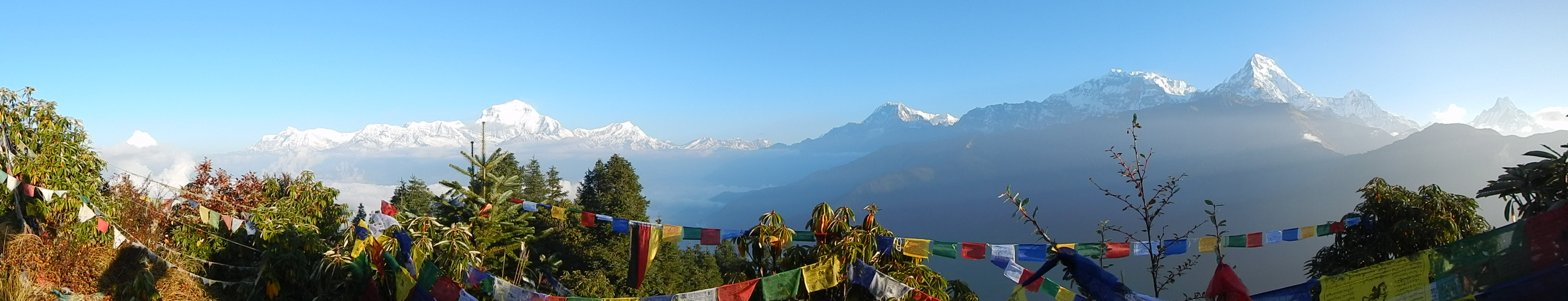
View from Poon Hill with Annapurna to the right and Dhaulagiri on the left
