= Annapurna Rural Municipality, Myagdi =

Annapurna Rural Municipality अन्नपूर्ण गाउँपालिका
- Gaunpalika
- Location in Nepal
- Coordinates: 28.352178°N 83.707148°E
- Country: Nepal
- Province: Gandaki
- District: Myagdi District

Area
  - Total: 556.41 km^{2} (214.83 sq mi)

Population
  - Total: 13,315
  - Density: 23.930/km^{2} (61.979/sq mi)
- Time zone: UTC+5:45 (Nepal Time)
- Website: http://annapurnamunmyagdi.gov.np/

Annapurna Rural Municipality, Myagdi (Nepali: अन्नपूर्ण गाउँपालिका) is a Gaunpalika in Myagdi District in Gandaki Province of Nepal. On 12 March 2017, the government of Nepal implemented a new local administrative structure, with the implementation of the new local administrative structure, VDCs have been replaced with municipal and Village Councils. Annapurna is one of these 753 local units.

== Demographics ==
At the time of the 2011 Nepal census, Annapurna Rural Municipality had a population of 13,337. Of these, 98.3% spoke Nepali, 0.8% Kham, 0.3% Sign language, 0.1% Magar and 0.4% other languages as their first language.

In terms of ethnicity/caste, 69.3% were Magar, 12.9% Chhetri, 8.2% Kami, 4.5% Damai/Dholi, 1.3% Hill Brahmin, 1.0% Thakali, 0.8% Gurung, 0.5% Tamang, 0.2% Badi, 0.2% Newar, 0.2% Rai, 0.2% Sanyasi/Dasnami, 0.2% Sarki, 0.1% Gaine, 0.1% Sherpa and 0.4% others.

In terms of religion, 81.4% were Hindu, 9.5% Buddhist, 6.3% Prakriti, 1.8% Christian, 0.1% Bon and 0.9% others.

In terms of literacy, 71.9% could read and write, 1.4% could only read and 26.7% could neither read nor write.
