= Chantyal language =

Sino-Tibetan language spoken in Nepal

Chhantyal
- Native to: Nepal
- Region: Gulmi, Baglung and Myagdi Districts
- Ethnicity: 9,800 (2001 census)
- Native speakers: 4,300 (2011 census)
- Language family: Sino-Tibetan: Tamangic; Chhantyal

Language codes
- ISO 639-3: chx
- Glottolog: chan1310
- ELP: Chantyal

Chhantyal is spoken by approximately 2,000 of the 10,000 ethnic Chhantyal in Nepal. Chhantyal is spoken in the Kali Gandaki River valley of Myagdi District; there are also ethnic Chantel in Baglung District (Ethnologue).

The Chhantyal language is a member of the Tamangic group (along with Gurung, Thakali, Manangba, Nar-Phu and Tamang) of the Sino-Tibetan family. Within its group, it is lexically and grammatically closest to Thakali.
