= Myagdi District =

District in Nepal

Coordinates: 28.3417°N 83.5666°E

Myagdi District (म्याग्दी जिल्ला)
- District
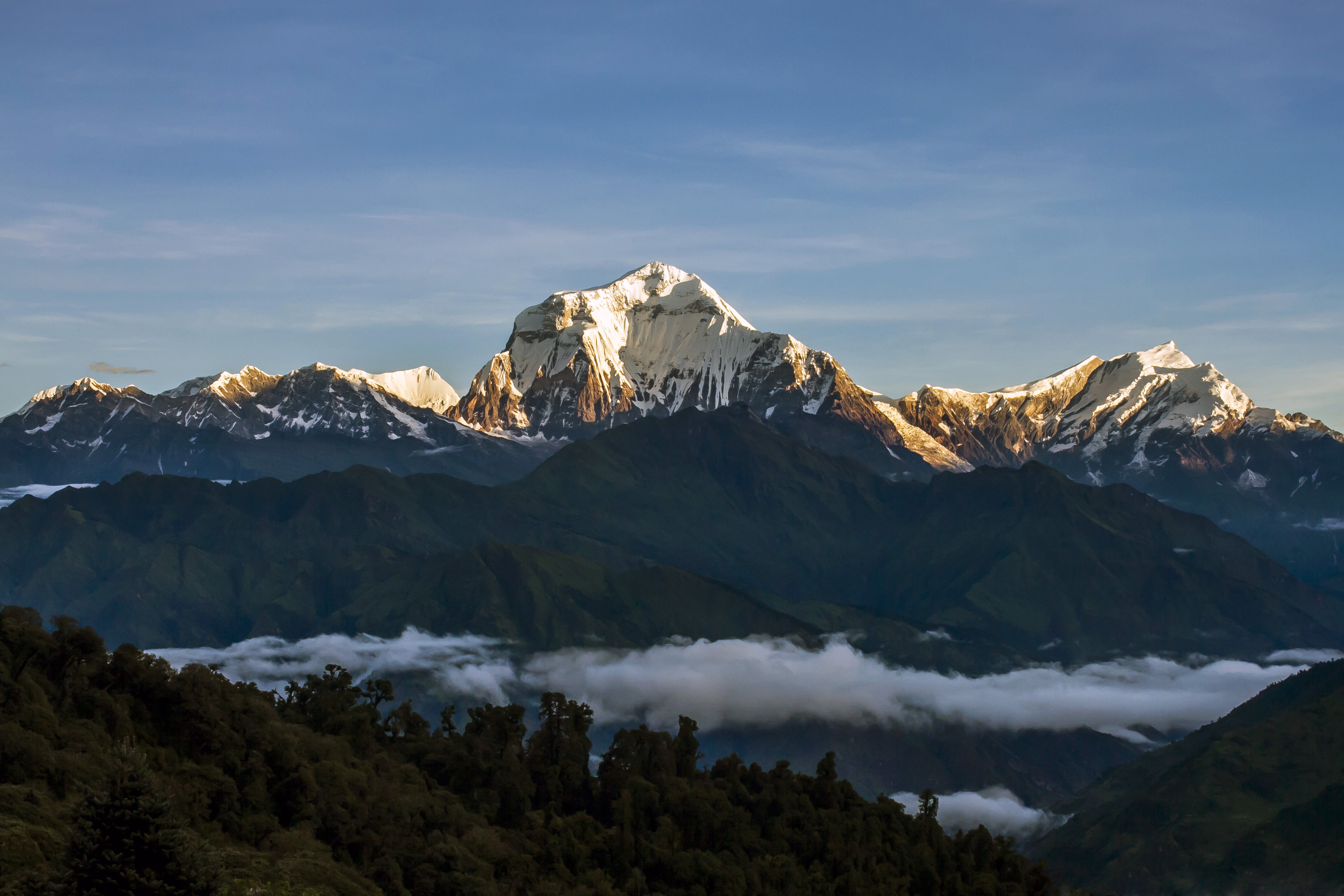
- View of Dhaulagiri from Ghorepani
- Interactive map of Myagdi District
- Country: Nepal
- Province: Gandaki Province
- Admin HQ.: Beni

Government
  - Type: Coordination committee
  - Body: DCC, Myagdi

Area
  - Total: 2,297 km^{2} (887 sq mi)

Population (2021)
  - Total: 107,372
  - Density: 46.74/km^{2} (121.1/sq mi)
- Time zone: UTC+05:45 (NPT)
- Telephone Code: 069
- Main Language(s): Nepali • Magar Kham

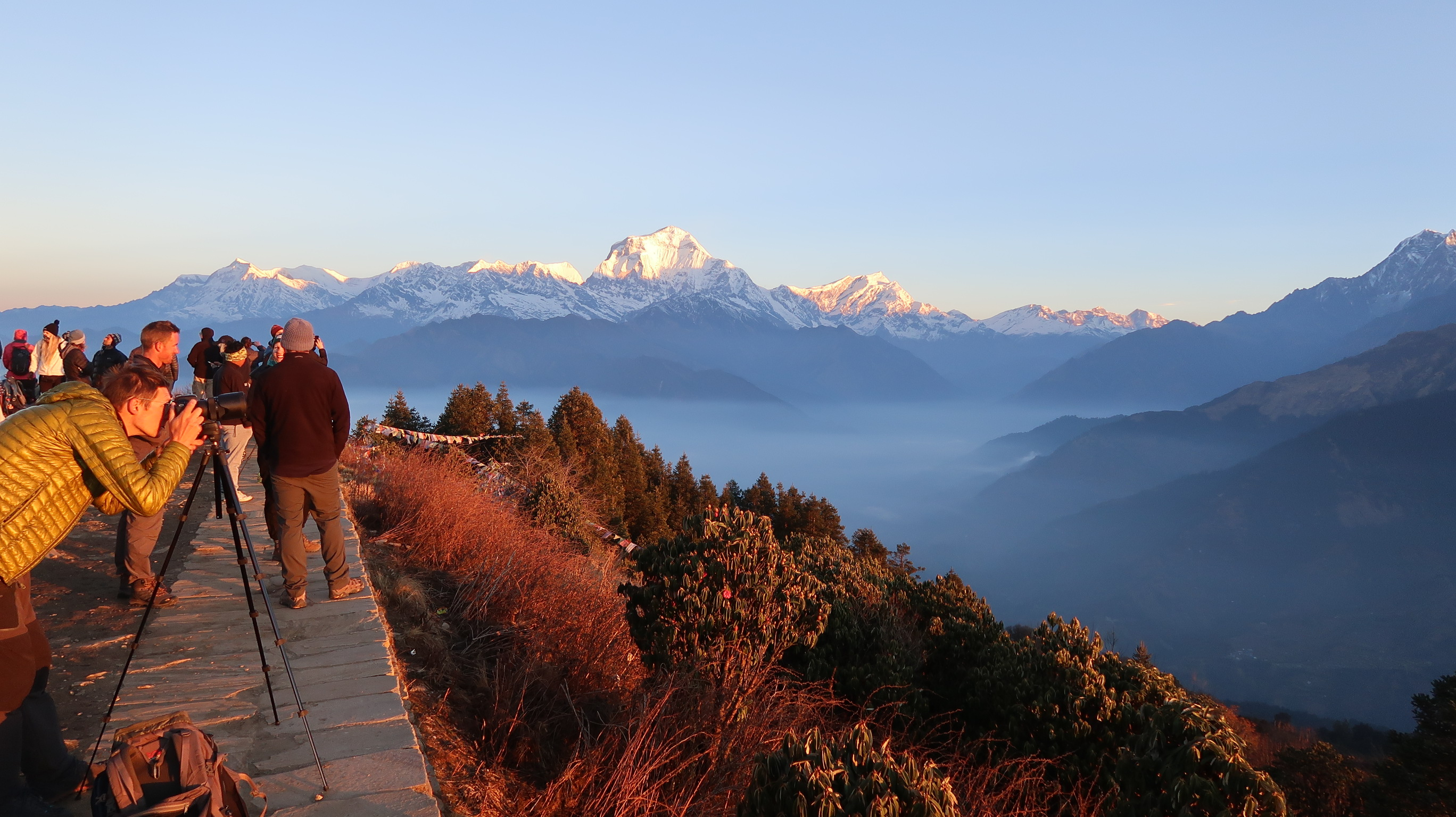
View of Annapurna and Dhaulagiri including many mountain ranges from Poon Hill (Pun Hill), Myagdi

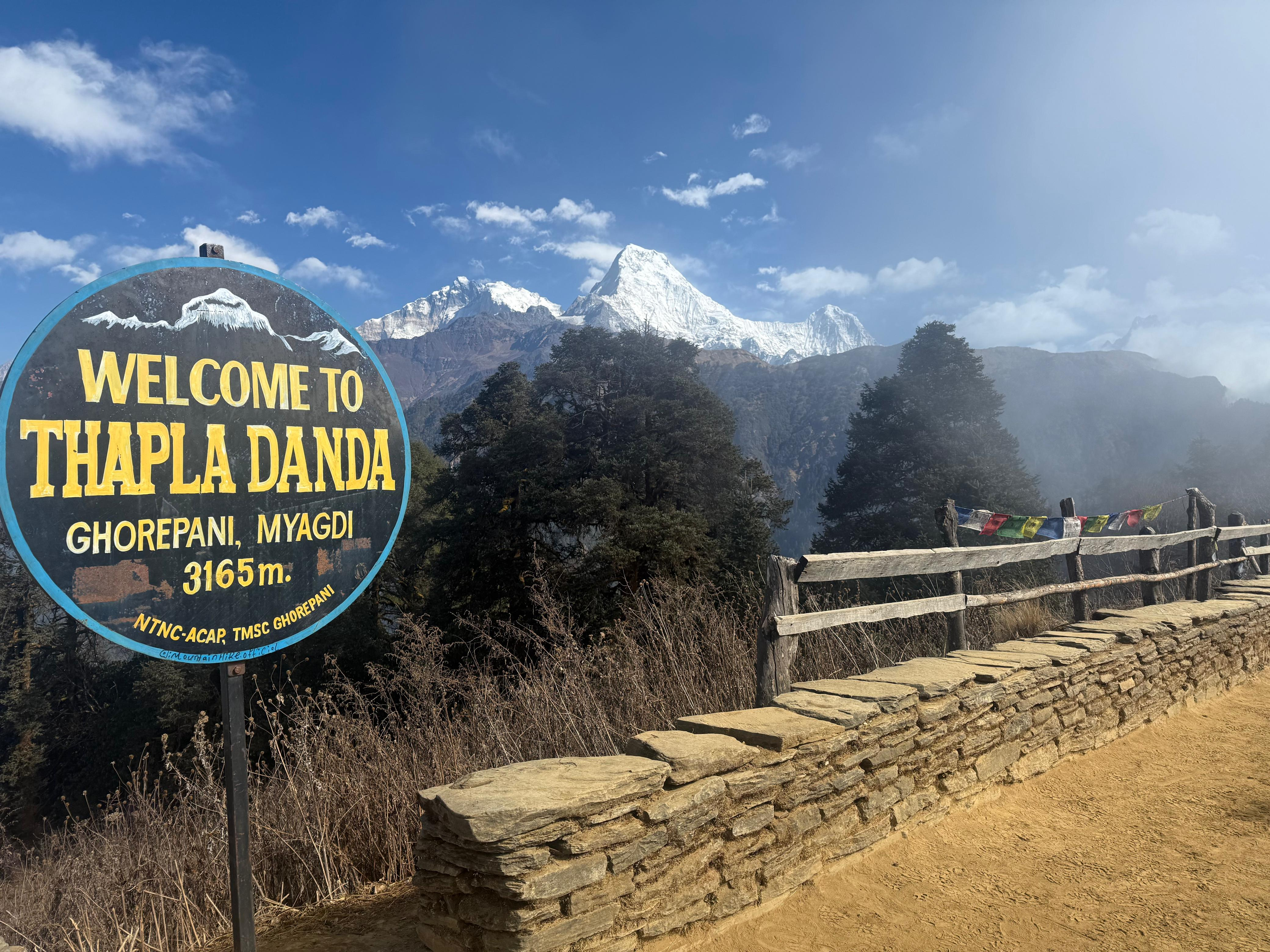
View of Annarpurna and Dhaulagiri ranges from Thapla Danda, Myagdi

Myagdi District (Nepali: म्याग्दी जिल्ला), a part of Gandaki Province, is one of the seventy-seven districts of Nepal. The district, with Beni as its district headquarters, covers an area of 2,297 km^{2} (887 sq mi), had a population of 114,447 in 2001 and 113,641 in 2011. Magar people especially Pun Magar or simply Pun are the largest population in Myagdi district.

In Myagdi district, there are many Pun villages, such as Doba (the third-largest Pun village), Narchyang, Gatpar (Gadpar), Paudwar, Pakhapani, Dana, Bega, Ghorepani, Chimkhola, Dagnam, Shikha, Baduk, Darmija, Kot Gau, Owlo, Bima (Rima), Histhan, Dachale gau, Khibang, Kuye Pani, Muna, Dang, Darwang (Darbang), Ramche, Jhi/Jhin, Patlekhet, Begkhola, Mudi, Bhurung, BireThati, Tibilang, Nangi. Pun have many sub-clans but in this area Pun sub-clans are mostly Chochangi, Purja, Garbuja, Paija, Ramjali, Sinjali, Thajali, Tilija, Dut, Pun, Phagami, Buduja, Rantija, Armaja, Thane/Thanh, Sherpunja/Serpuja, Khoroja, Pahare, Sut-Pahare.

Many Gorkha soldiers are recruited from here and have been serving in British Gorkha, in Gurkha Contingent Singapore Police, in Gurkha Reserve Unit Brunie and in Gorkha Rifles (India). Many Pun from here have also served in Hong Kong as British Gurkha soldiers. Victoria Cross Honorary Lieutenant Tul Bahadur Pun (VC), British Gurkha Sergeant Dipprasad Pun (CGC)—the only Gurkha who received the Conspicuous Gallantry Cross for an act of bravery—and Lieutenant Colonel Lalbahadur Pun (OBE, MC)—the first Gurkha Lieutenant Colonel in the British Army who received the Military Cross, and former Hong Kong Brigade of Gurkhas Training Depot Commander—having each been awarded prestigious combat medals for their outstanding bravery, all hail from Myagdi.

The most popular tourist spots in Myagdi are: Poon Hill (also spelled Pun Hill), Ghorepani, Poon Hill Trek, Karbakeli Footpath, Beni Bazaar, Maharani Than, Dhaulagiri Himal, Todke, Jagannath Temple, Galeshwor Dham, Malika Dhuri, Singa Tatopani Kunda, the Kaligandaki River, Rupse Jharna, and the highly revered Khayer Barahi Temple.

Myagdi District is a mountainous region and to reach these places, the easiest and nearest route is from the neighboring tourism hub of Pokhara to Beni, which serves as the district headquarters and a primary gateway to the area.

== Geography and climate ==
This district can experience 7 types of climates

Climate Zone i	Elevation Range	% of Area
Upper Tropical	300 to 1,000 meters 1,000 to 3,300 ft.	0.1%
Subtropical	1,000 to 2,000 meters 3,300 to 6,600 ft.	17.5%
Temperate	2,000 to 3,000 meters 6,400 to 9,800 ft.	28.0%
Subalpine	3,000 to 4,000 meters 9,800 to 13,100 ft.	21.1%
Alpine	4,000 to 5,000 meters 13,100 to 16,400 ft.	17.8%
Nival	above 5,000 meters	13.9%
Trans-Himalayan	3,000 to 6,400 meters 9,800 to 21,000 ft.	1.6%

== Demographics ==
Historical population
Census year	Pop.	±% p.a.
1981	96,904	—
1991	100,552	+0.37%
2001	114,447	+1.30%
2011	113,641	−0.07%
2021	107,372	−0.57%
Source: Citypopulation

At the time of the 2021 Nepal census, Myagdi District had a population of 107,033. 7.48% of the population is under 5 years of age. It has a literacy rate of 79.70% and a sex ratio of 1052 females per 1000 males. 32,697 (30.55%) lived in municipalities.

Castes/ethnic groups in Myagdi district (2021)
1. Magar (35.5%)
2. Chhetri (17.5%)
3. Kami (15.2%)
4. Bahun (7.41%)
5. Damai (6.83%)
6. Sarki (4.03%)
7. Pun (3.52%)
8. Chhantyal (2.75%)
9. Thakuri (1.94%)
10. Newar (1.26%)
11. Gurung (0.94%)
12. Other Hill Janjati (1.41%)
13. Others (1.62%)

Khas people make up 53% of the population, of which Khas Dalits are 26% of the population. Hill Janjati are 44% of the population. Magars are the single largest ethnicity, making up 39% of the population.

Languages of Myagdi district (2021)
1. Nepali (92.7%)
2. Magar (3.72%)
3. Chhantyal (0.96%)
4. Others (2.62%)

At the time of the 2021 census, 92.70% of the population spoke Nepali, 3.72% Magar and 0.96% Chhantyal as their first language. In 2011, 94.4% of the population spoke Nepali as their first language.

Religion in Myagdi District (2021)
Religion	Percent
Hinduism	87.55%
Buddhism	8.20%
Prakriti	2.12%
Christianity	1.52%
Other or not stated	0.61%

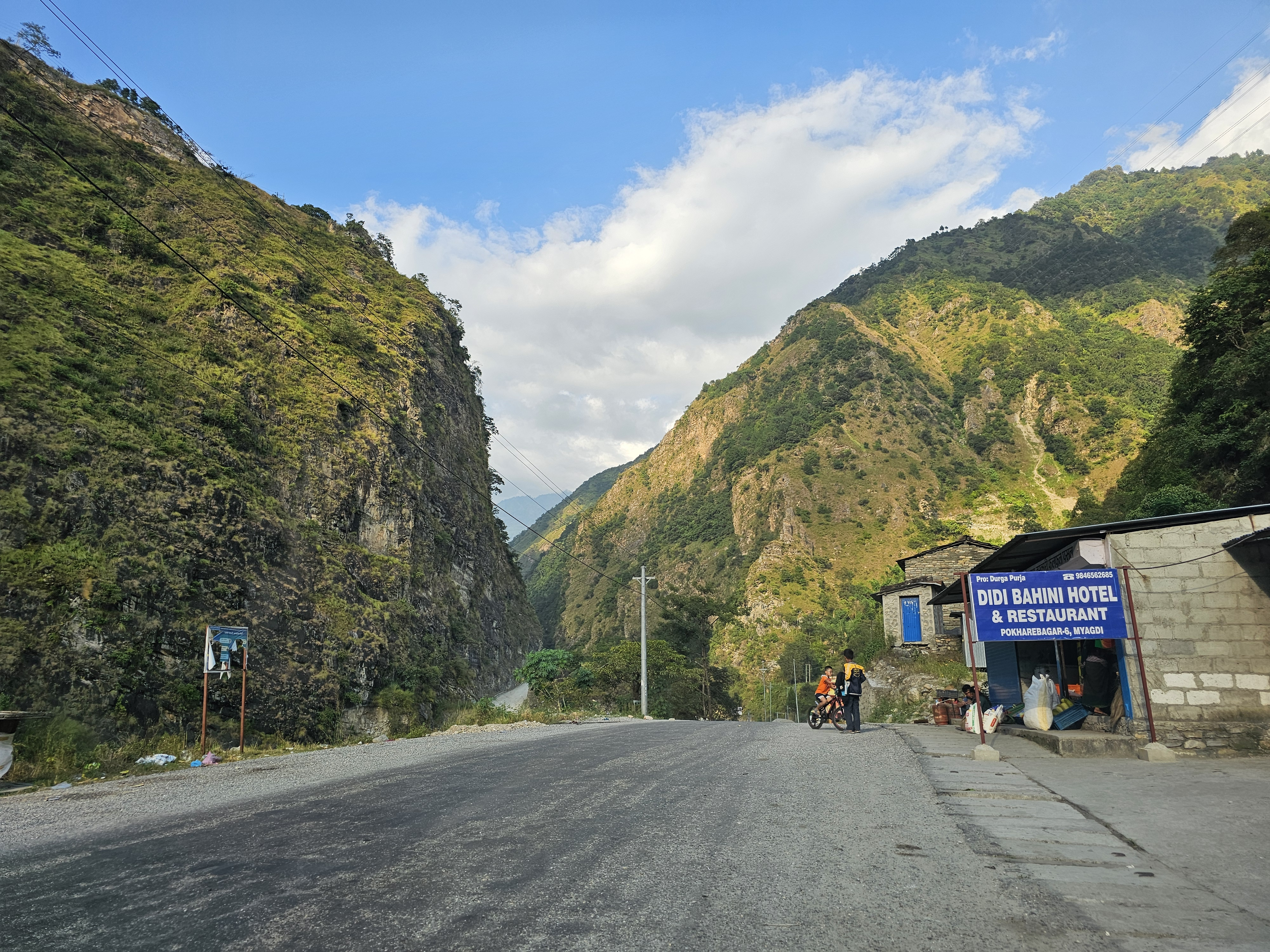
Pokharebagar, Myagdi

== Administration ==
The district consists of 6 Municipalities, out of which one is an urban municipality and five are rural municipalities. These are as follows:

- Beni Municipality
- Annapurna Rural Municipality
- Dhaulagiri Rural Municipality
- Mangala Rural Municipality
- Malika Rural Municipality
- Raghuganga Rural Municipality

=== Former Village Development Committees ===
Prior to the restructuring of the district, Myagdi District consisted of the following municipalities and Village development committees:

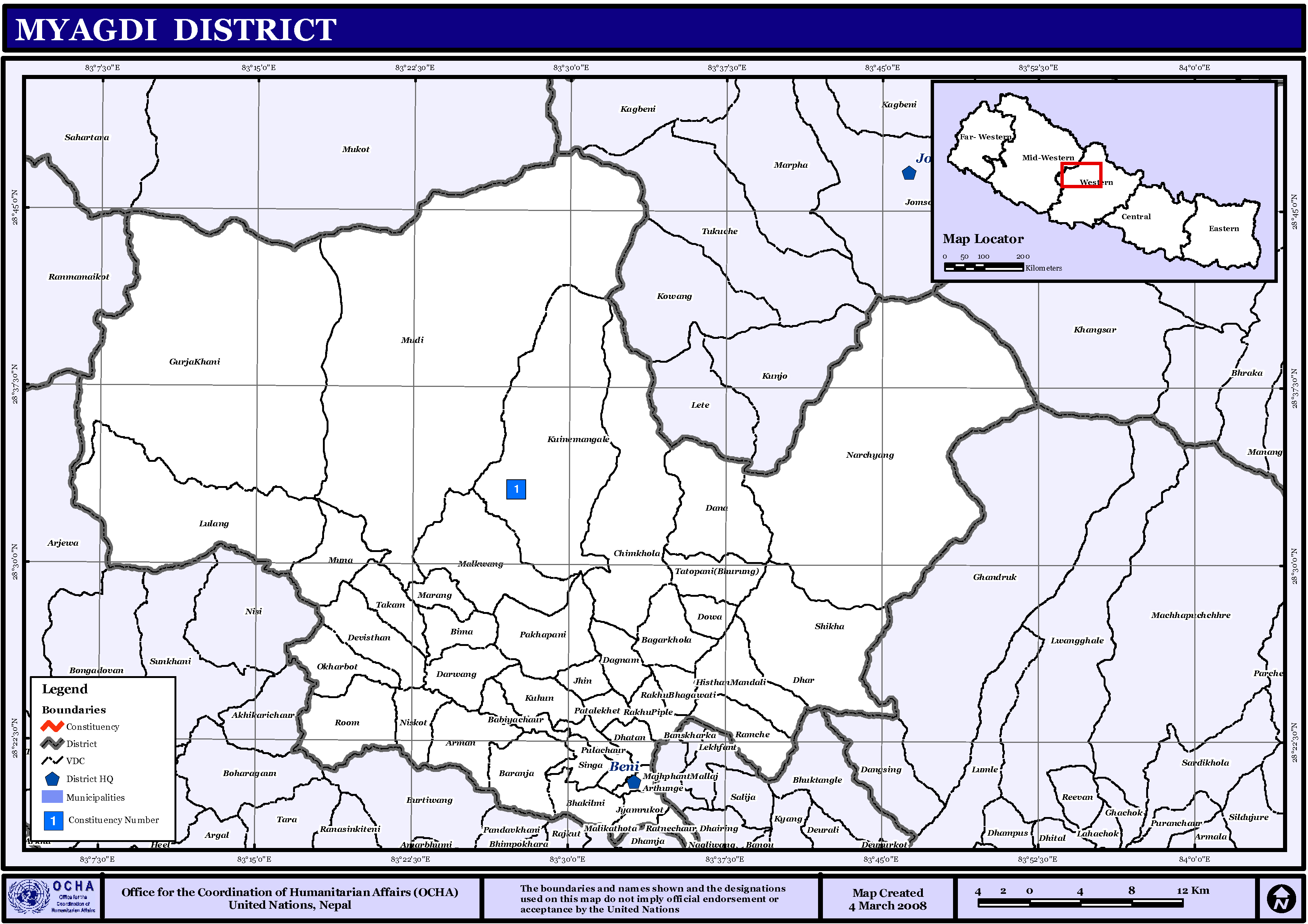
Map of the VDCs in Myagdi District

- Arman
- Arthunge
- Baadook
- Babiyachaur
- Baranja
- Begkhola
- Beni Municipality
- Bhakilmi
- Bhanbare
- Bima
- Chimkhola
- Dagnam
- Dana
- Darwang
- Devisthan
- Doba
- Ghar
- Ghatan
- Gurja Khani
- Histhan Mandali
- Jhin
- Jyamrukot
- Khibang
- Kuhunkot
- Kuinemangale
- Lulang
- Malkwang
- Marang
- Mudi
- Muna
- Nangi
- Narchyang
- Niskot
- Okharbot
- Pakhapani
- Patlekhet
- Pulachaur
- Rakhu Bhagawati
- Rakhupiple
- Ramche
- Ratnechaur
- Shikha
- Singa
- Takam
- Tatopani
- Ruma

== Notable people ==
- Lalbahadur Pun OBE, MC, first Gurkha to achieve the rank of Lieutenant-Colonel in the British Army, Commandant of the Training Depot Brigade of Gurkhas in Hong Kong, and recipient of the Military Cross.
- Narayan Singh Pun, politician, a prominent political figure and Cabinet Minister in Nepal, a former King's trusted Minister and government's chief negotiator, a pilot, chief training officer, (helicopter wing commander) a Lieutenant Colonel in the Royal Nepal Army and the founding President of Nepal Samata Party
- Min Bahadur Sherchan, who was the oldest man to summit Mount Everest for about 5 years, was born in Myagdi district of Nepal was born here.
- Nirmal Purja, (MBE), a famous mountaineer and former Gurkha British Army and Special Boat Service (SBS) soldier. He is known for the Netflix documentary "14 Peaks: Nothing Is Impossible"
- Mahabir Pun, Minister, social entrepreneur who brought wireless internet to over 175 remote villages using modified TV antennas, founder of the National Innovation Center, recipient of the Ramon Magsaysay Award (Asian Nobel Prize) in 2007, and 2014 Internet Hall of Fame inductee.

== Infrastructures ==
- Tatopani Hydropower Station (2 MW)

== See also ==
- Zones of Nepal
