= Pun (surname) =

- Language: Chinese, English, Magar or Magar Kham

Other names
- Variant forms: Chinese: Pan, Poon

Pun is a surname. It may be:

- A surname of the Magar people in Nepal
- An English surname of unexplained origin
- A Cantonese spelling of the Chinese surname transcribed as Pān in Hanyu Pinyin (潘). This surname has deep historical roots, dating back to the noble family Pan Chong of Chu, from a cadet branch of the ruling House of Mi, and Ji Sun, a descendant of King Wen of Zhou.

According to statistics cited by Patrick Hanks, there were 783 people with this surname on the island of Great Britain and six on the island of Ireland as of 2011. However, community estimates suggest the actual number of Pun in the UK is likely between 5,000 and 10,000—and potentially much higher—due to many Pun Gurkha families using only sub-clan names instead of 'Pun' and the arrival of many Pun—both HK-Chinese and HK-Nepalese—British National (Overseas) / BNO passport holders from Hong Kong. The 2010 United States census found 1,197 people with the surname Pun, making it the 21,736th-most-common name in the country. This represented an increase from 861 people (26,614th-most-common) in the 2000 census. In both censuses, more than four-fifths of the bearers of the surname identified as Asian.

== Notable people with this surname include: ==
- Kabir Pun, IOM, Nepali, Gorkha Havildar (British Indian Army) received the Indian Order of Merit (1st class) —equivalent to the Victoria Cross as native soldier were not eligible for VC until the World War 1— during the British expedition to Tibet (1903–4), Pun and Grant broke the wall of Gyantse Dzong and captured Gyantse Fortress. (Pun and Grant's actions are described in Grant's VC citation - Treaty of Lhasa 1904)
- Tul Bahadur Pun, VC (1923–2011), Nepali, Gurkha Honorary Lieutenant in the British Army and recipient of the Victoria Cross and Burma Star. Born in Myagdi district, Nepal.
- Lalbahadur Pun, OBE, MC (1937–2026), Nepalese—First Gurkha Lieutenant-Colonel in the British Army—Commander of the Gurkha Brigade Training Depot in Hong Kong, and recipient of the Military Cross and OBE. He was from Myagdi.
- Ranjit Pun, VrC, Nepalese Gorkha Subedar in the Indian Army and Vir Chakra recipient during the Indo-Pakistani War of 1947–1948. He was from Pyuthan, Nepal
- Bir Bahadur Pun, MVC, Nepalese (from Pyuthan District), Gorkha Honorary Captain in the Indian Army and recipient of the Maha Vir Chakra (India's second-highest wartime bravery award)
- Om Prasad Pun (born 1942), Nepali boxer
- Narayan Singh Pun (1949–2008), Nepal's former cabinet minister, King's trusted minister, and royal chief negotiator during the civil war; Royal Nepal Army Lieutenant Colonel, pilot and helicopter wing commander, and founding President of the Nepal Samata Party. He was from Myagdi.
- Serge Pun (潘繼澤; born 1953), Burmese billionaire of Chinese descent—a prominent multi-national real estate tycoon, former chairman and founder of Yoma Bank (one of Burma's largest private banks) and Serge Pun & Associates (SPA Group) in Hong Kong and Myanmar.
- Dr Mahabir Pun (born 1955), Nepal's Independent MP, Cabinet Minister, scientist, teacher, activist and social entrepreneur; Ramon Magsaysay Award (Asia's Nobel Prize) winner and "Internet Hall of Fame inductee" for bringing wireless technologies to rural parts of Nepal, internet pioneer and Founder of the National Innovation Center (NIC). He is from Myagdi district.
- Pun Kwok-shan (潘國山; born 1961), Hong Kong politician.
- Nanda Kishor Pun (born 1966), First Vice President of Nepal—under the 2015 Constitution—and former Chief Commander of the People's Liberation Army (PLA)
- Barsaman Pun (born 1971), Nepal's two-time Finance Minister, a key Deputy Commander of the PLA during the Nepal Civil War, and a CPN (Maoist Centre) senior leader from Rolpa—the Maoist-Magar heartland
- Ganesh Man Pun 'Rashmi', of Rukum, Nepal's former Minister for Commerce and Supplies, founding YCL chairman, and Maoist rebel political commissar and commander of PLA 4th Division during the civil war
- Dipendra Pun Magar 'Sijal', from Rolpa, Nepal's Minister for Health of Lumbini Province, a high-ranking Maoist Politburo Member, and a PLA Brigade Commissioner and Commander during the Civil War
- Amar Singh Pun, Nepal's former Minister of State for Irrigation, key figure from Rolpa District, and President of the Nepali Congress, Lumbini Province.
- Dipprasad Pun, CGC (born 1980), Nepali sergeant of the Royal Gurkha Rifles (British Army) and the first Gurkha to be awarded the Conspicuous Gallantry Cross for bravery in the 21st century. He is from Myagdi, Nepal.
- Sagar Pun (born 1993), Nepali cricketer
- Pun Wai-yan (潘慧欣; born 1995), Hong Kong rugby union player
- Raymond Pun (潘宏), American research librarian
- Pun Ngai, Hong Kong sociologist and professor, and the first Asian scholar to receive the C. Wright Mills Award in 2005 for her book Made in China: Women Factory Workers in a Global Workplace.
- Pun Sing-lui (潘星磊), Hong Kong performance artist
- Suzie Pun, American bioengineer
- Anthony Pun, Hong Kong film-maker, Pun won Best Cinematography at the 42nd Golden Horse Awards for Divergence (2005). He also won the Hong Kong Film Award for Best Cinematography twice, for The Silent War (2012) and The Goldfinger (2003)

== See also ==
- Zein Pun (1295–1330), King of Martaban (Burma) for one week in 1330 (Note: Burmese names do not have surnames)

== Mythology ==
- Pun Tao Kong (or Pun Tao Ma), a tutelary Deity or Goddess in Chinese folk religion, is highly regarded by overseas Chinese, and his shrines exist in many countries such as Thailand, Malaysia, Vietnam, Cambodia, and Singapore. As Pun Tao Ma, this Goddess acts as a tutelary protector.
