= Chhantyal =

Indigenous people of Nepal

The Chhantyal (Nepali: छन्त्याल जाति) are an indigenous people of Nepal. Chhantyals are considered an indigenous group by the Government of Nepal. Most of the Chhantyal dwellings are concentrated in the western part of the country. Baglung and Myagdi are two districts in the Dhaulagiri Zone where most of the Chhantyals are living. Other districts with Chhantyal habitation include Mustang, Gulmi, Rukum, and Parbat. Nowadays, owing to the migration trend there is a notable population of the Chhantyals in Kathmandu Valley, Pokhara, Rupandehi, Kaski, Dang and Chitwan districts. According to a survey conducted by its sole organization, Nepal Chhantyal Organization, the total population is 16,093 and 1,602 households. Traditionally Chhantyals have been living with other castes in harmony. In some villages Chhantyals are a major group whereas in other villages they are a minority. Chhantyals have their own culture, tradition, rituals, language, and religion.

Most of the Chhantyal’s major occupation is farming. Foreign remittance also plays a vital role. British and Indian Gurkha army, gulf countries, Malaysia, Japan, US, Australia and Europe have been some of the destination for foreign employment in recent years.

As a matter of faith, Chhantyals worship nature and their ancestor's spirits. They give animal sacrifices on trees, hills, sources of water and other special places like farms and at the altar inside a house etc. Some of the gods include Barah, Kuldebata, Sime Bhume, Mandali etc. Because of Hinduism's overwhelming pressure in the 19th century, Chhantyals have adopted a mixed worshiping style. Maghe-Sankranti and Saune-Sankranti are two major festivals. These two festivals have special importance on nature and ancestor's spirit worship. Dashain and Tihar, Hindu's major festivals, are also celebrated as special occasions.

Chhantyals are formed of twelve different clans which are as follow: Bhalanja [भलंजा], Budhathoki [बुढाथोकी, Dandamare [डांडामारे], Gharabja [घरब्जा], Gharti [घर्ती], Ghyapchan [घ्याप्चन], Jhingraja [झिङराजा], Khadka [खड्का], Potlange [पोट्लाङ्गे], Purane [पुराने], Singe [सिङे] and Tathapja [तथप्जा].Traditionally they marry inside their twelve clans. One of the major distinct characteristics of the community is the marriage tradition. Cousin marriage is allowed but has to be outside one's own clan.

== Geographic distribution ==
The 2011 Nepal census classifies the Chhantyal as a subgroup within the broader social group of Mountain/Hill Janajati. At the time of the Nepal census of 2011, 11,810 people (0.0% of the population of Nepal) were Chhantyal. The frequency of Chhantyal people by province was as follows:

- Gandaki Province (0.4%)
- Bagmati Province (0.0%)
- Karnali Province (0.0%)
- Lumbini Province (0.0%)
- Madhesh Province (0.0%)
- Koshi Province (0.0%)
- Sudurpashchim Province (0.0%)

The frequency of Chhantyal people was higher than national average (0.0%) in the following districts:

- Myagdi (3.5%)
- Baglung (1.5%)
- Mustang (0.7%)
- Eastern Rukum (0.2%)
- Kaski (0.2%)
- Gulmi (0.1%)
- Parbat (0.1%)
- Rupandehi (0.1%)
- Surkhet (0.1%)

== Language ==
The Chhantyals’ language known as Chhantyal Kham (छन्त्याल खाम) is moribund. Most of the Chhantyals in Baglung have ceased to speak Chhantyal Kham many years ago. Some efforts have been made but the goal to preserve it is somewhat far from current efforts. The main problem with Chhantyal Kham is that there is no written alphabet. Some words and expressions are akin to the (Tamu) Gurung Kham language, but these two are separate Khams with distinct identity and history.

The Chhantyal language is spoken by approximately 5,000 of the about 15,000 ethnic Chantyals. The villages where the Chantyal language is spoken are all located in the eastern portion of the Myagdi District and include the villages of Mangale Khani, Dwari, Ghyas Kharka‚, Chaura Khani, Kuine Khani, Thada Khani, Patle Kharka‚ Malhampar, and Malkabang. There is relatively little linguistic variation among these villages. The Chhantyal language is a member of the Tamangic group (along with Gurung, Thakali, Nar-Phu and Tamang) Within the group, it is lexically and grammatically closest to Thakali.
