= Katuwa Chaupari =

Katuwa Chaupari कटुवा चौपारी
- Municipality
- Location in Nepal Katuwa Chaupari (Nepal)
- Coordinates: 28.205°N 83.692°E
- Country: Nepal
- Zone: Dhawalagiri Zone
- District: Parbat District

Population (1991)
  - Total: 1,838
- Time zone: UTC+5:45 (Nepal Time)
- Postal Code/Pin Code: 33400 (D.P.O)
- Area code: 067
- Website: katuwachaupari.com

Katuwa Chaupari (Nepali: कटुवा चौपारी) is a market center in Kushma Municipality in Gyandi of Parbat District in the Dhawalagiri Zone of central Nepal. The formerly Village Development committee was annexed to form the municipality since 18 May 2014. At the time of the 1991 Nepal census it had a population of 1838 people living in 361 individual households.

== Meaning and origination ==
Katuwa Chaupari is composed of two words 'Katuwa' and 'Chaupari'. Literally, 'Katuwa' means 'Cut-off' and 'Chaupari' means 'Forum'. There used to be a Chaupari (चौपरी)/Chautari(चौतारी) having two trees: Bar (वर) Peepal(पिपल) and between those two trees local people made a pathway for travelers dividing (cut-off) the Chaupri into two. From then and there the name of the place was originated. The exact place exists now also known as "Katuwa" only.

The Chaupari was made for people especially porters to let them rest their heavy loads. There were seats made up of stones on the lower base of the Chaupari. People from different places, while visiting this place, used to rest there and share their feelings with each other. The Chaupari was even used for selling goods in the past.

In one of the tree (right side) there used to be "Vitte Patro" (Nepali: भित्ते पात्रो) the first newspaper of Katuwa Chaupari. It was more like Wall Paper than a newspaper whose title used to be "Sital Chautari" (Nepali: सितल चौतारी) that means "Refreshing Forum" or "Cool Forum". The handwritten newspaper used to be locked inside a wooden frame with a web-wired in-front. It was done so as to protect the newspaper. It was made like that you can see & read but couldn't touch and damage it. Every month person like Sudip Lamichhane used to prepare and change it. They used to have a lock of that wooden frame.

This place still exists near/next to Sri Sarbajanik Madhyamik Vidhyalaya (Old High School of Katuwa Chaupari). And from that place, the name "Katuwa Chaupari" was originated. At present the exact location is called "Katuwa" which is a part of "Katuwa Chaupari" itself. Katuwa Chaupari lies in Gyandi in the Kushma Municipality (not to be confused with Kusma.

== Hills and mountains ==
Katuwa Chaupari is a plain land in the mountainous range of Western Nepal surrounded by hills. In the eastern side, there are hills of Nuwar and Karkineta and Balewa Hill lies in the west of Katuwa Chaupari. Annapurna, Machhapuchhre and ranges can be seen in the Northern side whereas Dhaulagiri lies in the North-East direction.

Sunrise can be observed from the various Eastern hills like Malami Hill whereas sunset in the Balewa Hill (west) in the evening is one of the best view for naked eyes. There lies an Airport at Balewa.

== Rivers ==
Sarangde River flows from East-West and gets mixed into Modi River and the Chinne River flowing in the East-North direction passing through Alapeshwor Cave merges into Modi Khola flowing from West to South. At Modi Beni (informally:Modi Muni), the Modi River merges to the Kali Gandaki River, the only river in the World where Saligram Stone (a holy black stone) are found and also has deepest gorge in the world. Sarangde Khola has pools like Bulbule, Sarangde, Pahare, Lamhe, Talpale and others.

Many local and international tourists go rafting in the Kali Gandaki River. For the people of Katuwa Chaupari, Gyandi and nearby places, Modibeni/Modimuni in the lap of Kali Gandaki river is considered a religious place.
