= Tricity, Nepal =

The Tricity is an area of Nepal that comprises the cities of Baglung, Beni and Kushma as core market centers. The three cities are headquarters of Baglung, Myagdi, and Parbat Districts respectively. Baglung was previously the headquarters of Dhaulagiri zone. The Tricity area is a major center of population and economic activity in West-central Nepal. As three district headquarters and the zonal headquarter are located in the valley there is a large concentration of governmental and nongovernmental offices, banks, educational institutes, cottage industries and healthcare centers. Geographically, 50 km long, region of Kali Gandaki valley stretching from Galeshwor to the north to Phalewas to the south can be considered the Tricity region.
