= Paudhur =

Paudur पाउँदुर Paundur
- Village in Nepal
- Location in Nepal Paudur (Nepal)
- Coordinates: 28.278230°N 83.833222°E
- Country: Nepal
- Province: Gandaki Province
- District: Kaski District
- Village in: Paudhur

Population (2068 BS)
  - Total: 3,099
- Time zone: UTC+5:45 (Nepal Time)
- Area code: 061

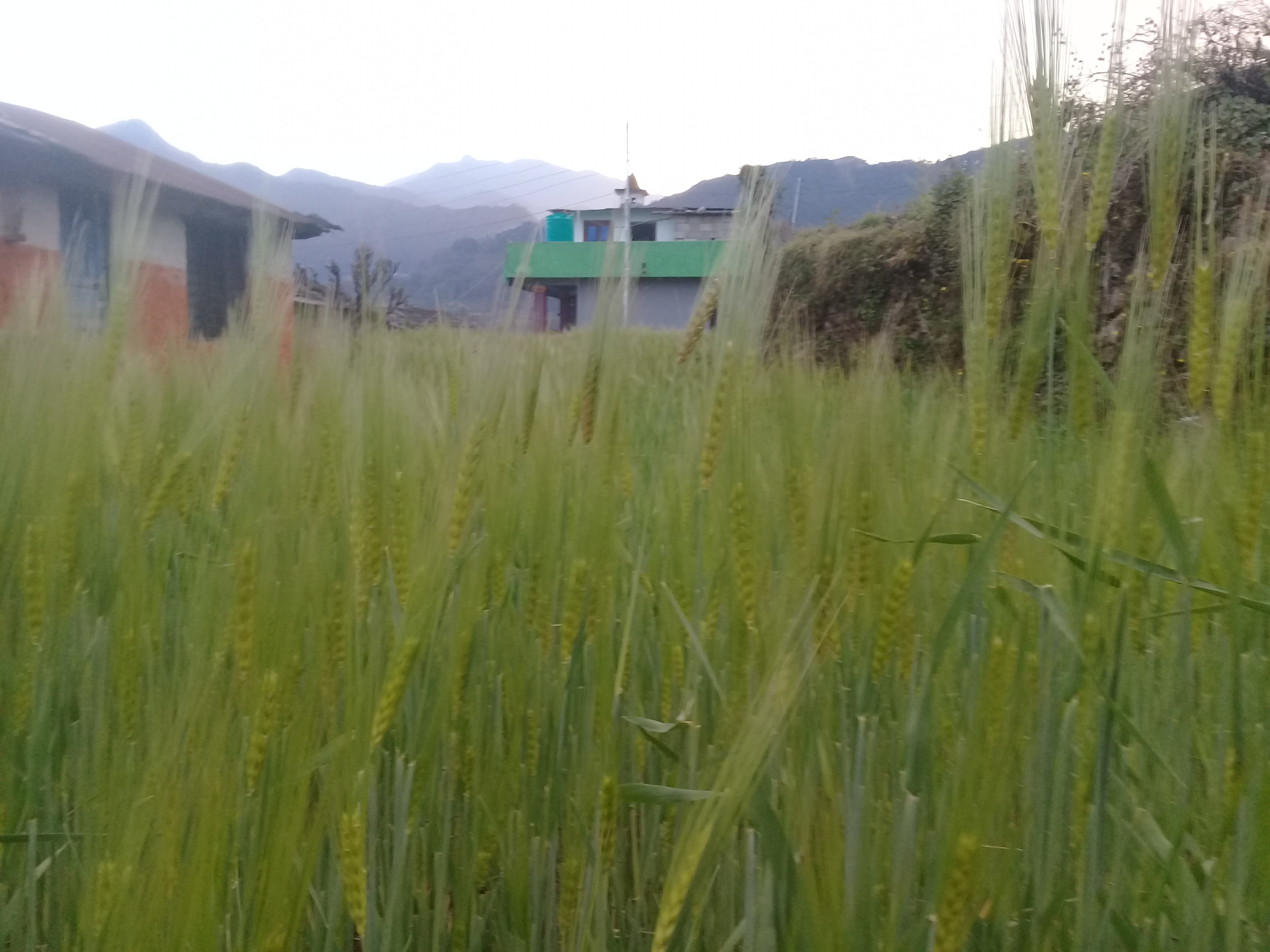
Wheat Farming in Paudhur.

Paundur (पाउँदुर) is a central village in Kaski district of Gandaki Province of Nepal. It lies about 28 km west of the Pokhara valley and 38 km east of Kushma, Parbat. It is a part of ward no. 3 of Annapurna Gaupalika of Gandaki Province of Nepal, and was the ward no.5 and 8 of the former Dhikurpokhari VDC.It lies west of Nagdanda; nearest sub urban area. There are more than 100 houses in this village.

== Geography ==
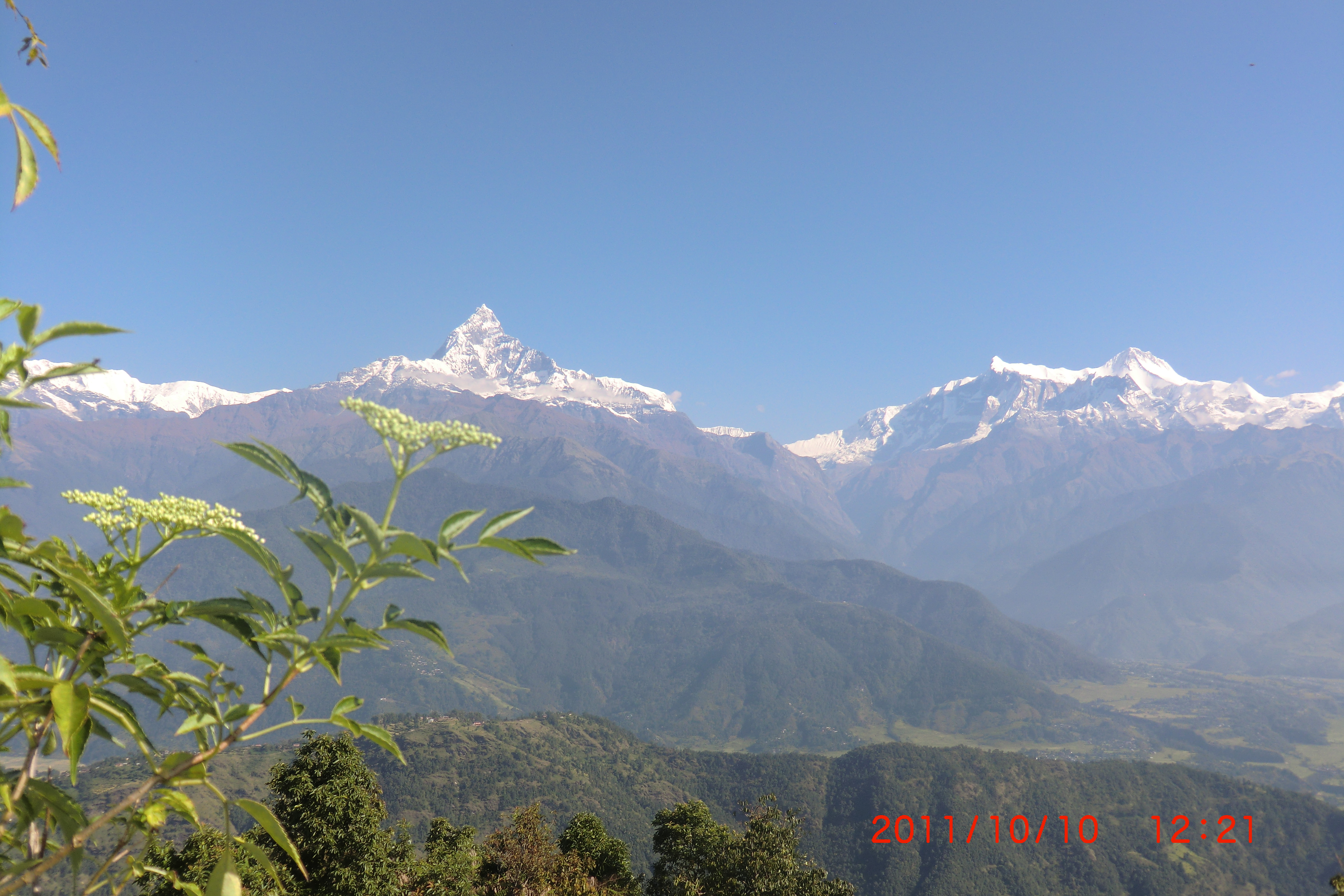
Annapurna Range visible from Paundur

It is located in Annapurna Massif, north of Phewa Tal at a distance of 28 kilometers west of Pokhara by Pokhara Baglung Highway after Sarangkot and Dhikurpokhari. It is on the mountainside ridge at an altitude of 1,678 meters, It equally provides panoramic Hilly views. On the northern side of Paundur, Dhawalagiri Mountain can be seen in the far North-East. The Annapurna mountain range is clearly visible on the same side. To the east, the village overlooks the city of Pokhara across Phewa Tal. Panchase can clearly be seen at west from Paundur.

Paundur shares its territories with other villages of former Dhikurpokhari VDC like Rayale, Paundurkot, Kande, and Sera as well.

== Sub villages ==
As Paundur, a part of ward no. 3 of the Annapurna Gaupalika. There are sub villages or toles. Some of them are:

1. Masthok
2. Maidan
3. Ranithok
4. Paundurkot
5. Dharapani
6. Rayale
7. Deurali
8. Bhakaridanda
9. Patthar
10. Bhiramuni
11. Ghumti
12. Dhungamuni
13. Sera

== Literacy ==
Paundur is a literate village in Annapurna Gaupalika. About 90% of the people from each family are educated. There is One Secondary school named Shree Dharapani Secondary School and one Primary School named Shree Laxmi Basic School. After completing secondary level education some students go to Machhapuchhre Higher Secondary School and some students go to Pokhara for higher education.

== Places to visit ==
In this village, the mix culture of modern and typical village culture creates a unique experience for an individual who is from a solely modern society and who is from a undeveloped community. There are many streams, rivers, jungles, and cliffs nearby as well. There are many temples in this village such as;

1. Harihar Temple
2. Dharapani Shivalaya
