= Serachaur =

Coordinates: 28°16′33″N 83°51′24″E

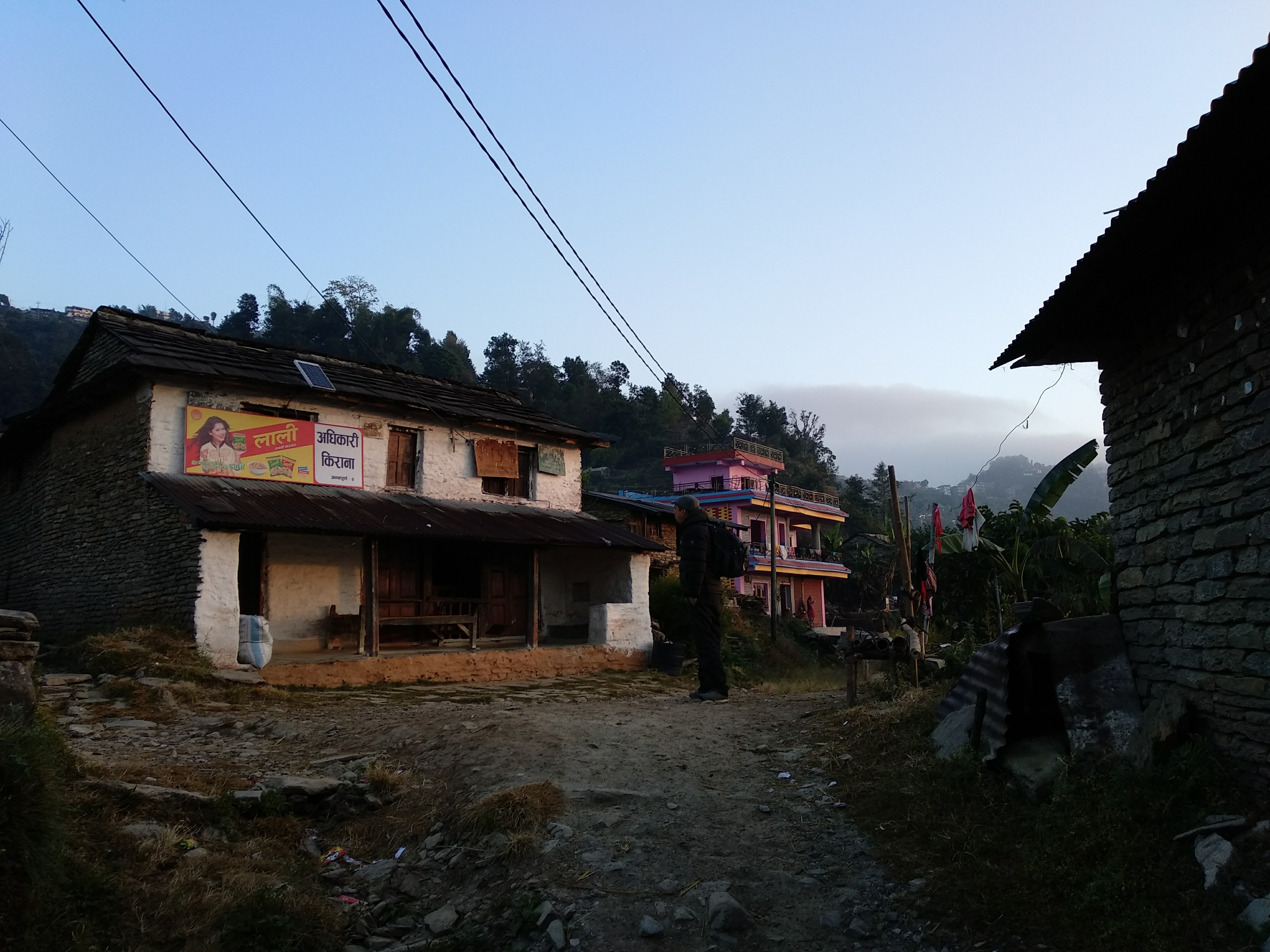
Main junction of the village. This house is replaced with a concrete one in 2024. DACS Basic School buildings (for teaching class 1 to 8). Serachaur viewed from Krishi-Sadak

Serachaur (Nep. सेराचौर) is a village in Kaski District, Gandaki Province, Nepal. The word Sera refers to a flat (farm)land, normally used to grow rice to supply food to a royal court and Chaur means a grassy land. First settlers of this village were Adhikari families. The village is located in the Annapurna Gaunpalika Ward Number- 2, Kaski, Nepal. It used to be a part of the erstwhile Dhikurpokhari Village Development Committee (VDC) which later, with the adoption of federalism in Nepal in 2015, the Government of Nepal dissolved tand replaced with the new structure. This village lies on the southern flank of the Dhikurpokhari ridge, on the Pokhara-Baglung Highway. A concrete narrow motorable access road to the village starts at the Zero point in the town of Nagdanda (Nagdanda), which is located in the old tourist trail to Annapurna and Mustang. It takes about 15 minutes to walk to Serachaur from this point. There are more road connections being built to the village, including the Krishi Sadak starting from the town of Pokhara. This village was originally under the Kaskikot Kingdom.

== Literacy ==
Until access to formal education started around 1960s, people in the village relied on the traditional form learning literacy, through informal home schools (pidhi pathshala). Subsequently, with the arrival of modern formal educational institutions, children from the village started making progress. The first school in the village, Shree Durgabhawani Primary School was established in 1973. With access to a school close to home, the literary rate rose substantially, enabling a large number people to access higher qualification. As the government allowed the opening of the privately run English-medium schools in the 1990s, people started to be attracted to newly opened schools in nearby town, resulting in the dwindling student numbers in public schools. In order to mitigate this problem but also to offer affordable access to all, a new community-based school, Aadarsha Samudayik Vidhyala was opened in 1999 (2056 BS) and formally registered in 2000. The idea to offer English-medium education to all, irrespective of their affordability, through community-based cooperative model was itself a pioneering initiative. However, running two schools in one village proved impracticable over time, and they were merged in 2005, into Durga-Bhawani Adarsha Samudayik School. Overall, the village is known for its relative educational success in the region. A good number of graduates from the village have succeeded entering in civil service and academia.

There are major buildings located at the lower part of village (Deuthape) housing basic (unto class 8) classes and administrative office, and one is located at the centre of the village, which offers pre-primary (early-learning) education. After completing the basic level (class 8), students go to secondary schools, located elsewhere, but main destination is Machhapuchchhre Secondary School located in Dhikuarpokhari. The school has received support from the government, local community and international charities, such as Maya Foundation.

== Geography ==
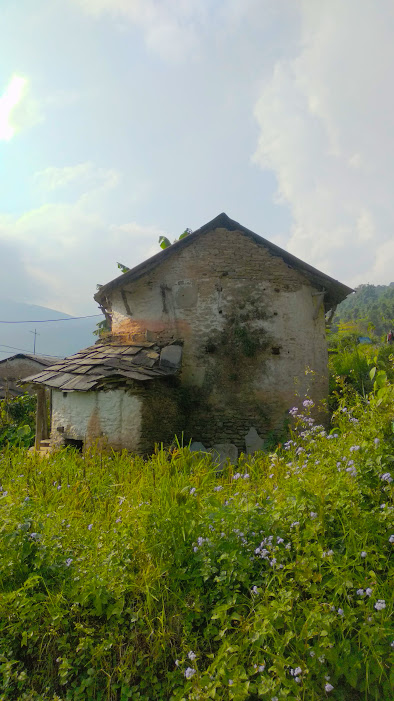
Old house at Serachaur ( In the past houses looked somehow like this except the roofs, which were made out of thatch )

Serachaur is located at an altitude of about 1350 metres, on the western ridge of the valley surrounding the city of Pokhara. The village is joined by other small villages, Saurini and Thulachaur. Adheri Khola, which is located at the southern base of the village, and Harpan Khola, make up two major river systems feeding into Phewa Lake.

== Houses ==
Serachaur village is dense with houses situated close to each other. There has been rapid and significant changes in the housing structure of the village in the past 75 years. When Tony Hagen took very popular picture of the village in the 1950s, all the houses, except one, were round shaped with thatched roof. These houses were built with mud, stone and wood. Tony Hagen, though wrongly labels the name of the village, describes the housing in a beautiful way: "The picturesque habitations detach themselves from the landscape like mushrooms in relief. The walls are snow-white with a big red border at the base. The pin-shaped roofs are covered with straw, sometimes also with slate" (Hagen 1961: Plate 36). This picture of the village has been reproduced in many publications promoting Nepal. Then came rectangular houses with stone (large thick slates) roofs. Over time, many of these houses underwent the replacement of the stone roofs with corrugated metal roofing sheets. In the past 10 years, there is a new trend to demolish these stone-mud houses and build concrete buildings. Not a single round house originally seen in the picture taken by Hagen exists by 2025.

== Agriculture ==
The village is originally subsistence agriculture-based. Main crops grown in the area are rice, paddy, wheat, maize and millet. People primarily rely on the local produces for their source of food. Because there are no irrigation systems, the agriculture is rain-fed. Rice is the most important cereal crop, which is cultivated during the monsoon season. Locals also produce and supply fresh grains, (organic) vegetables, and meat products There is growing involvement in livestock keeping (mainly cow and buffalo) and milk production, which is sold to local dairy cooperative and eventually supplied in the town of Pokhara, is one of the main sources of local economy. There is very limited modernisation in agriculture and, due to rise in foreign and urban migration, farm lands are increasingly going barren. There are also a few poultry farms in the village.

== Caste/Ethnic Groups ==
The majority of people living in Serachaur are Brahman (Bahun) and a few are Dalits (Pariyars and Bishwakarma). Among Brahamans, Adhikaris are in the large numbers. Others include Bhandaris and Dahals.

== Tourism ==
The village facing south and east, Phewa Lake and part of the Pokhara city, are clearly visible. Because of its southern face, only small part of the Annapurna Himalaya is visible. However, with a 15-20 minutes walk to Naudada or Dhikurpokhari, the whole range of Annapurna will be appear to the north. As for now there are no any hotels or lodges in the village proper, but there are opportunities to live with families as a paying guest. The recently built (under improvement) Krishi Sadat (agricultural access road) passes through the villages and reaches up to Paudurkot. Serachaur could also serve as a alternate trek route for Panchase. Thos with their own means of transport (motorbike, car) can arrive in the village in about 30-40 minutes from Pokhara.
