= Shivalaya =

Shivalaya means any temple of the Hindu deity Shiva, especially one with a Shivalinga. It may also refer to:

- Shivalaya, Parbat, a former Village Development Committee in Parbat District, Gandaki Province, Nepal
- Shivalaya Rural Municipality, a Rural municipality in Jajarkot District, Karnali Province, Nepal
- Shivalaya Upazila, a sub-district in Manikganj District, Dhaka Division, Bangladesh
