= Shalgram =

Sacred place in Hinduism

Shalgam शालग्राम Salgram
- Named for: Shaligram
- Hindu site dedicated to Vishnu

Shalgram (Sanskrit: शालग्राम) also known as Salgram is considered a sacred place in the tradition of the Vaishnava sect in Hinduism. It is on a bank of the Gandaki River in Nepal.
