= Rahughat Khola =

Rāhughāt Kholā राहुघाट खोला

Location
- Country: Nepal

Physical characteristics
- Source
  - location: Glaciers, snowfields on S. face of Dhaulagiri I
  - coordinates: 28°40′N 83°31′E
- Mouth
  - location: Krishna Gandaki above Beni
  - coordinates: 28°22′28″N 83°34′10″E
  - elevation: 880 m (2,890 ft)

Basin features
- River system: Narayani River

The Rahughat Khola is a tributary of the Kali Khola and Myagdi Khola in Nepal.

== Course ==
The Rahughat Khola (stream) originates from several glaciers and snowfields on the southwest face of Dhaulagiri and flows southwest in its open glacial valley among old moraines, alpine pastures and sub-alpine forests. Then the stream drops into a narrow canyon, heading southeast through temperate and then sub-tropical forests, past scattered villages such as Chimkhola, Darmija, Dagnam, Pakhapani, Kotgaun, Jhin, Wakhet, Rakhu etc. The Rahughat khola joins the Kali Gandaki river at Galeshwor area, above Beni bajaar.

This is a beautiful river. People still call it names such as Raghu Ganga, Rabar khola, Rahughat khola, Sunsari khola etc.

== Related organisation ==
"Rahughat Khola Sero-Fero UK" is an organisation in the UK which was established on 23 August 2008 in London in relation to this river. It helps people who migrated to the UK from surrounding area such as Dana, Bhurung Tatopani, Doba, Baduk, Begakhola, Rakhu, Dagnam, Darmija, Chimkhola, Mangale, Kuhine Mangale, Raikhor, Kotgaun, Pakhapani, Jhin, Wakhet, Purnagaun, Kuhun etc.
