= Modi Khola Hydroelectric Power Plant =

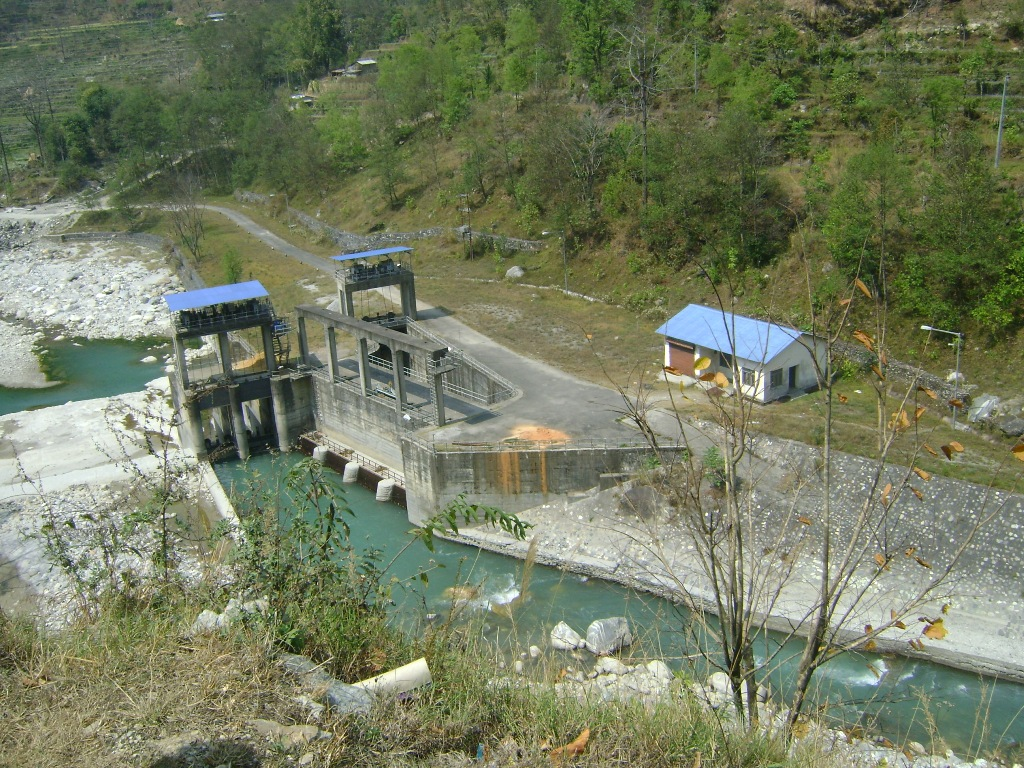

- Location within Nepal
- Official name: Modi Khola Hydroelectric Power Plant
- Country: Nepal
- Coordinates: 28.2199°N 83.6991°E
- Purpose: Power
- Status: Operational
- Owner: Nepal Electricity Authority

Dam and spillways
- Type of dam: Gravity
- Impounds: Modi River

Modi Khola Hydroelectric Power Plant
- Coordinates: 28.2199°N 83.6991°E
- Commission date: 2059-04-31 BS
- Type: Run-of-the-river
- Hydraulic head: 67 m (220 ft)
- Turbines: 2 Francis-type turbines
- Installed capacity: 14.8 MW

Modi Khola Hydroelectric Power Plant (Nepali: मोदी खोला जलविद्युत आयोजना, Modi Khola Jalbidyut Ayojana) is a run-of-river hydro-electric plant located in Parbat district of Nepal. The flow from Modi River is used to generate 14.8 MW electricity. Annual energy generation capacity is 92.5 GWh. This power plant began operating in 2000 and is owned by the Nepal Electricity Authority (NEA).

The plant was constructed in assistance from Economic Development Cooperation Fund (EDCF) (Korea), Government of Nepal and NEA at a cost of US$30 million.

== Plant Performance ==
The plant's performance is considered poor during monsoon due to high volume of abrasive sediments. The sediment handling facilities are considered insufficient causing abrasive of turbines, butterfly valves, and wicket gates.

== See also ==
- Lower Modi-1 Hydroelectric Power Plant
- List of power stations in Nepal
