= Shivalaya, Parbat =

Shivalaya
- Location in Nepal Shivalaya (Nepal)
- Coordinates: 28.23°N 83.69°E
- Country: Nepal
- Zone: Dhawalagiri Zone
- District: Parbat District

Population (1991)
  - Total: 5,234
- Time zone: UTC+5:45 (Nepal Time)

Shivalaya (शिवालय) is a place and the older name of Kushma Municipality in Parbat District in the Dhawalagiri Zone of central Nepal. At the time of the 1991 Nepal census, it had a population of 5234 people living in 1076 individual households.

The Shivalaya Village Development Committee consists of the headquarters of Parbat district, Kushma, which is also known as Kusumpuri. The area provides access to two giant rivers: Kaligandaki, a location for river rafting, and Madi Khola, which has been identified for its hydroelectric potential. The region is also home to Gupteshwor Cave, a geological site that takes about two hours fully navigate. Additionally, the area features a high-altitude suspension bridge that serves as a tourist attraction.
