= Ratnechaur =

Ratnechaur रत्नेचौर
- Location in Nepal Ratnechaur (Nepal)
- Coordinates: 28.32°N 83.59°E
- Country: Nepal
- Zone: Dhaulagiri Zone
- District: Myagdi District

Population (1991)
  - Total: 2,369
- Time zone: UTC+5:45 (Nepal Time)

Ratnechaur is a market center in Beni Municipality in Myagdi District in the Dhaulagiri Zone of western-central Nepal. The former village development committee was annexed to form the new municipality on May 18, 2014. At the time of the 1991 Nepal census it had a population of 2369 people living in 434 individual households.
