= Pang, Parbat =

Pang, Nepal Birthplace of Goddess Parbati
- Location in Nepal Pang, Nepal (Nepal)
- Coordinates: 28.26°N 83.63°E
- Country: Nepal
- Zone: Dhawalagiri Zone
- District: Parbat District

Population (1991)
  - Total: 4,091
- Time zone: UTC+5:45 (Nepal Time)

Pang, Nepal is a market center in Kushma Municipality in Parbat District in the Dhawalagiri Zone of central Nepal. The former Village Development committee was annexed to form the municipality since 18 May 2014. At the time of the 1991 Nepal census it had a population of 4091 people residing in 791 individual households. Pang is believed to be the birthplace of Goddess Parbati. The world's second longest suspension bridge named as Gandaki Golden Bridge is situated in Pang. It is one of the major historical places of Parbat District.

It is mainly famous for Parbati cave, Gandaki Golden Bridge, sahasradhara water fall etc

Pang, Parbat is believed to be the birthplace of Goddess Parbati. Pang is more famous now due to the longest Suspension bridge of Nepal- Gandaki Golden Bridge connecting Pang, Parbat and Ramrekha, Baglung. It is located near to the Baglung Kalika Bhagawati Temple.
