= Modi River =

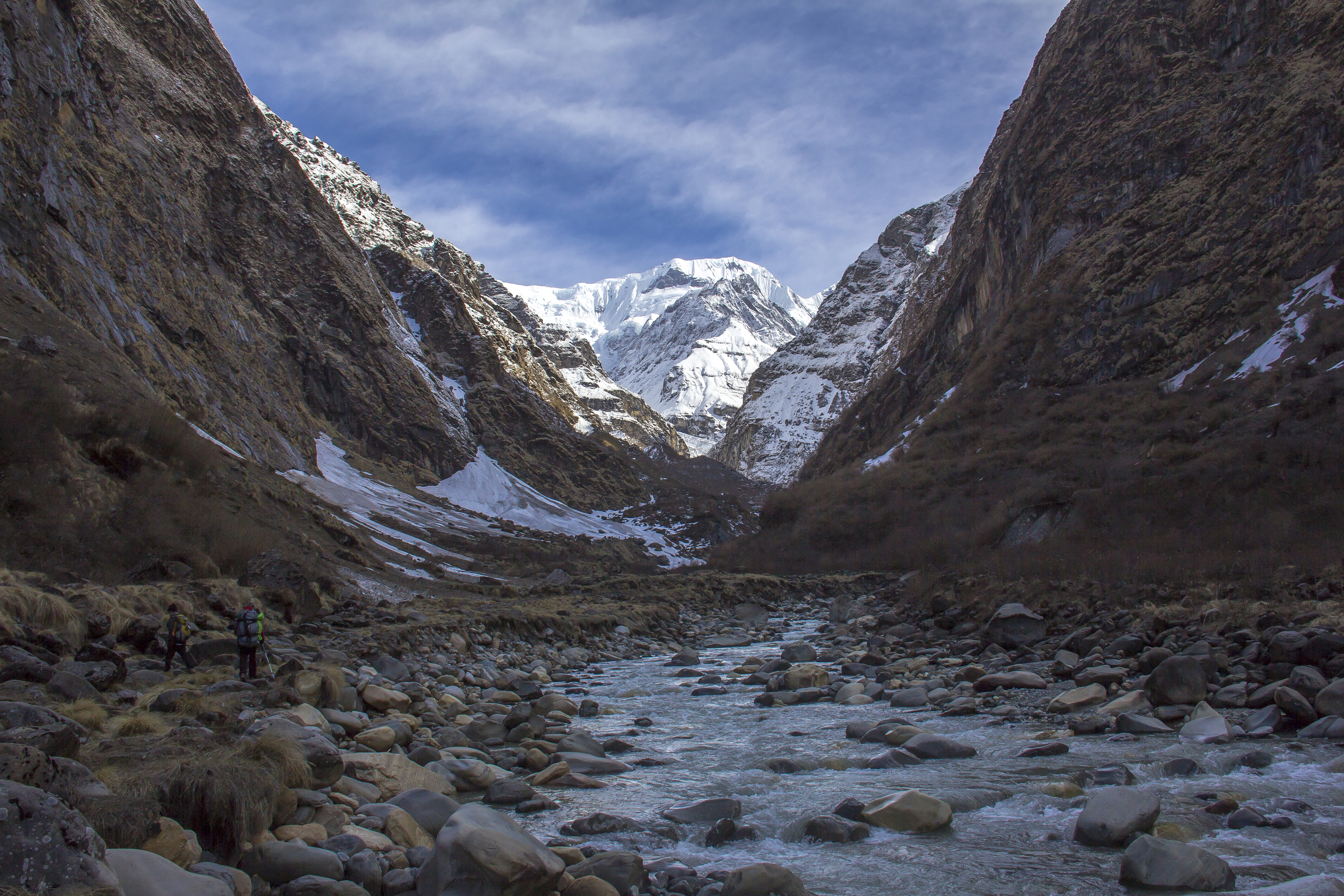
- Native name: मोदी खोला (Nepali)

Physical characteristics
- Source: Annapurna Mountains
- Mouth
  - coordinates: 28°12′09″N 83°40′12″E
- Basin size: 675 sq. km.

Basin features
- River system: Gandaki River

Modi River or Modi Khola is a tributary of Gandaki River in Parbat district of Nepal. It is a snow-fed perennial river originating from Annapurna Mountains and has a catchment area of 675 km². It meets the Kali Gandaki River at Modi Beni of Parbat District. The total length (from head to the confluence) of the river is approximately 50km. The main tributaries of the Modi river are Bhurangdi Khola, Rati Khola, Pati Khola, Malyangdi Khola, Ghandruk Khola and Ambote Khola. The mean annual precipitation in the basin is approximately 2,700mm and 80% of the total annual rainfall occurs during the monsoon.

== Water Use ==
The river banks Modi Khola consists of forest area and few agricultural and cultivated land. It is argued that the water of the Modi Khola is not suitable for irrigation purpose as the water in the Khola mainly comes from the melting glaciers and is too cold for crops.

Land use in Modi River basin
Land use	Area (km2)
Cultivation	132.9
Forest and bush	273.5
Grassland/Pasture	68.2
Glacier	34.3
Others	165.8

=== Fisheries ===
Commercial or traditional fish farms/ponds are not present in the Modi river. However, the river has various fish species (mainly Asala or Snow trout) naturally. Other fish species are carps (Schizothorax plagiostomus, Schizothorax richardsonii, Schizothoraichthys progastus, Garra gotyla and Garra annandalei) and catfish (Glyptothorax pectinopterus and Pseudecheneis sulcata).

=== Drinking water ===
The water from Modi Khola is not used for drinking purpose.

=== Hydropowers ===
Following hydropower projects are either constructed, under-construction or under planning in this river, all of them are run-of-river types.

- Upper Modi A Hydroelectric Power Plant (42MW)
- Upper Modi Hydroelectric Power Plant(14MW)
- Landruk Modi Hydroelectric Power Plant (86.59MW)
- Middle Modi Khola Hydroelectric Power Plant(15.1MW) - under construction
- Modi Khola Hydroelectric Power Plant(14.8MW) - operating
- Lower Modi Khola Hydroelectric Power Plant(20MW) - under construction
- Lower Modi-1 Hydroelectric Power Plant(10MW) - operating
- Lower Modi-2 Hydropower Project(10.5MW)

== Gallery ==
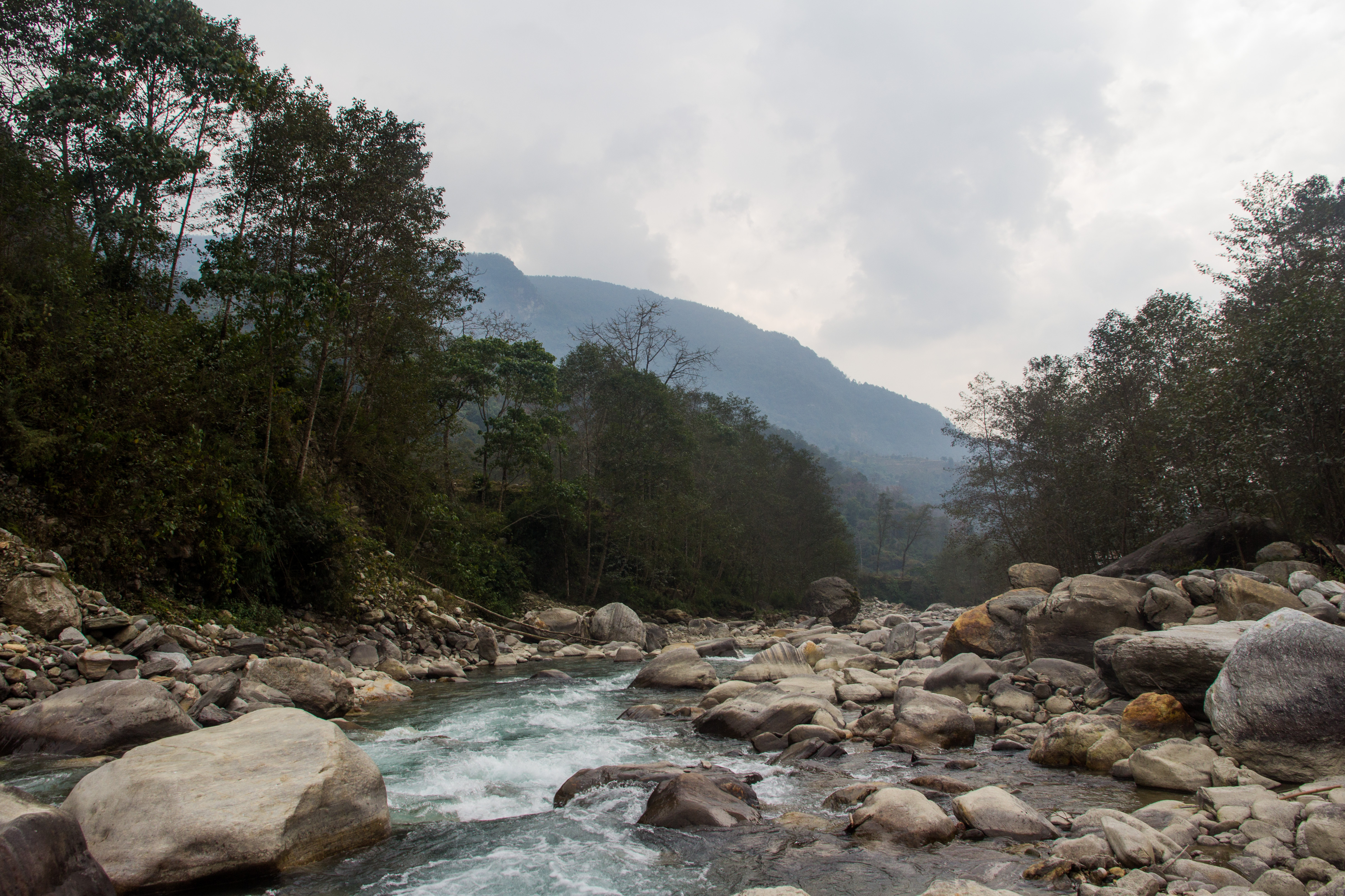
River view

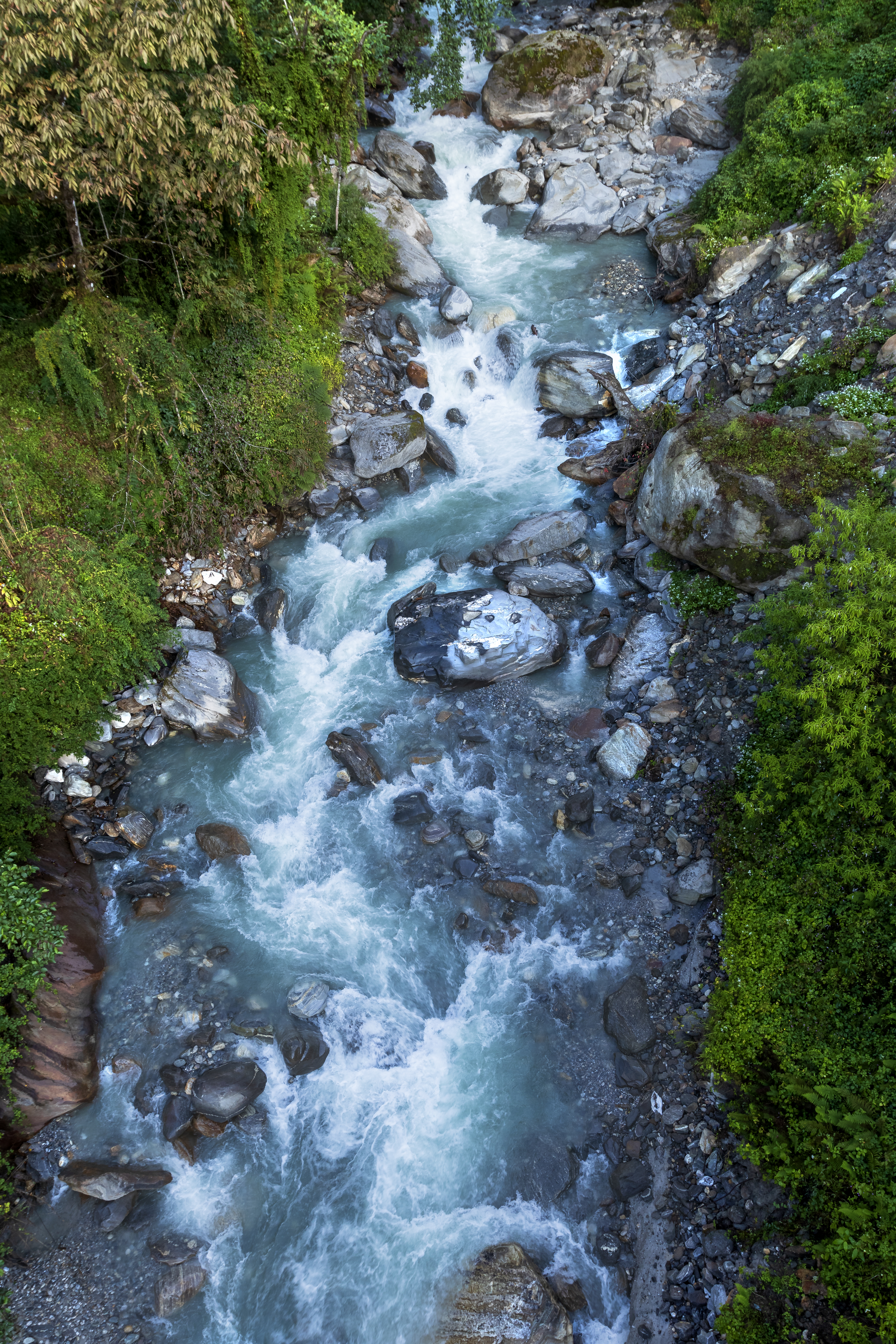
At Sinuwa village

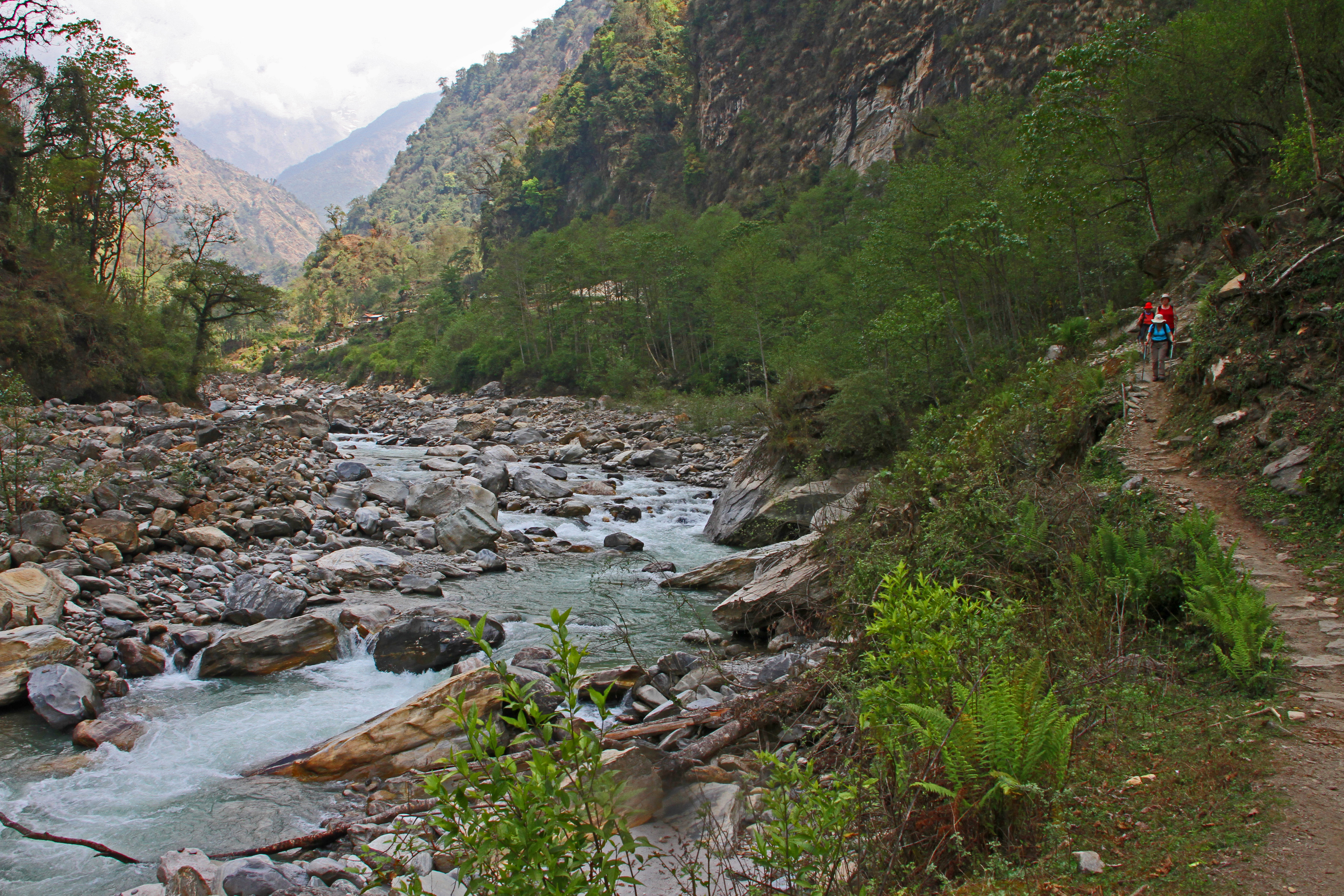
Jhinudanda-Landruk

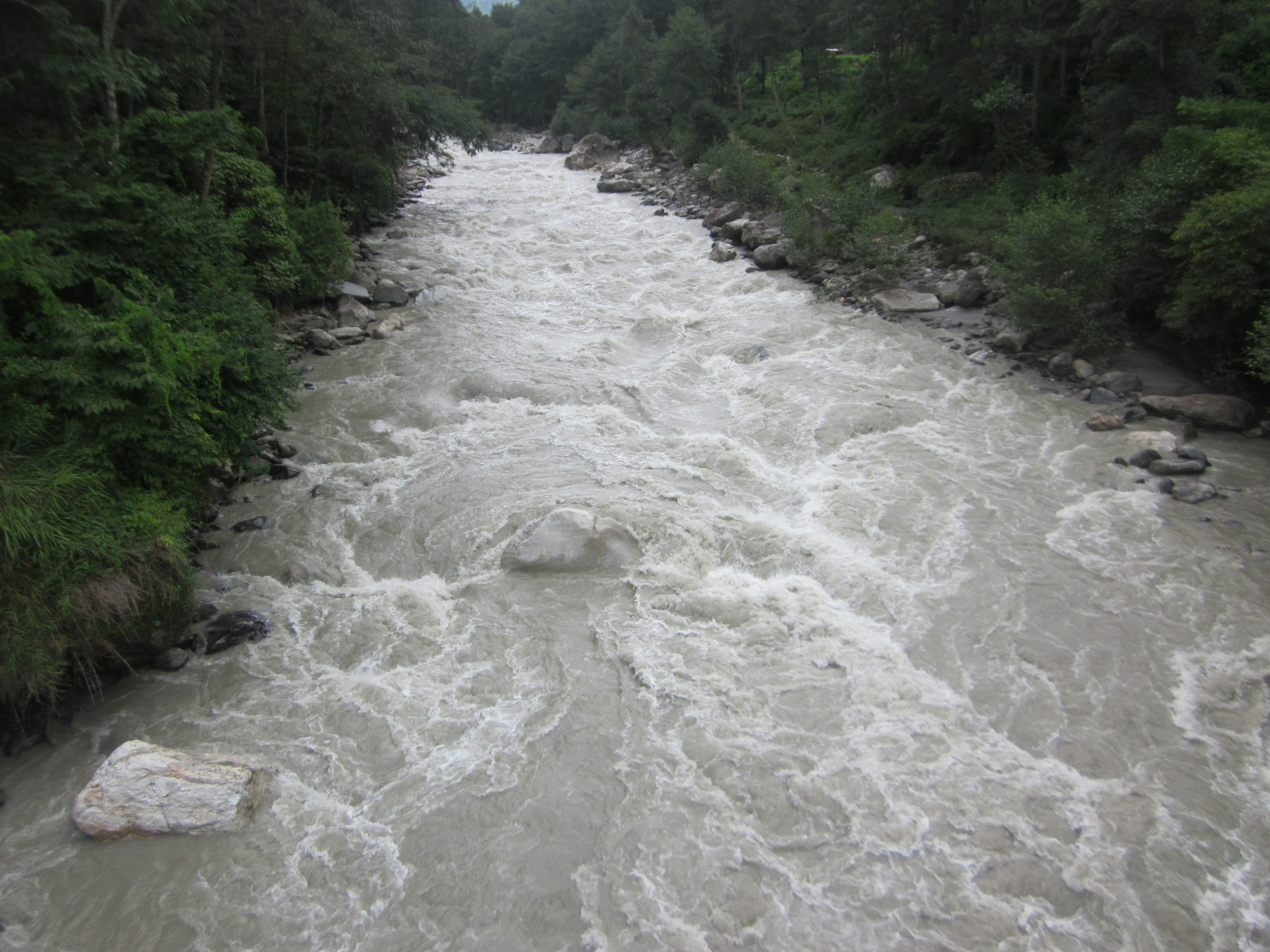
Flooded view

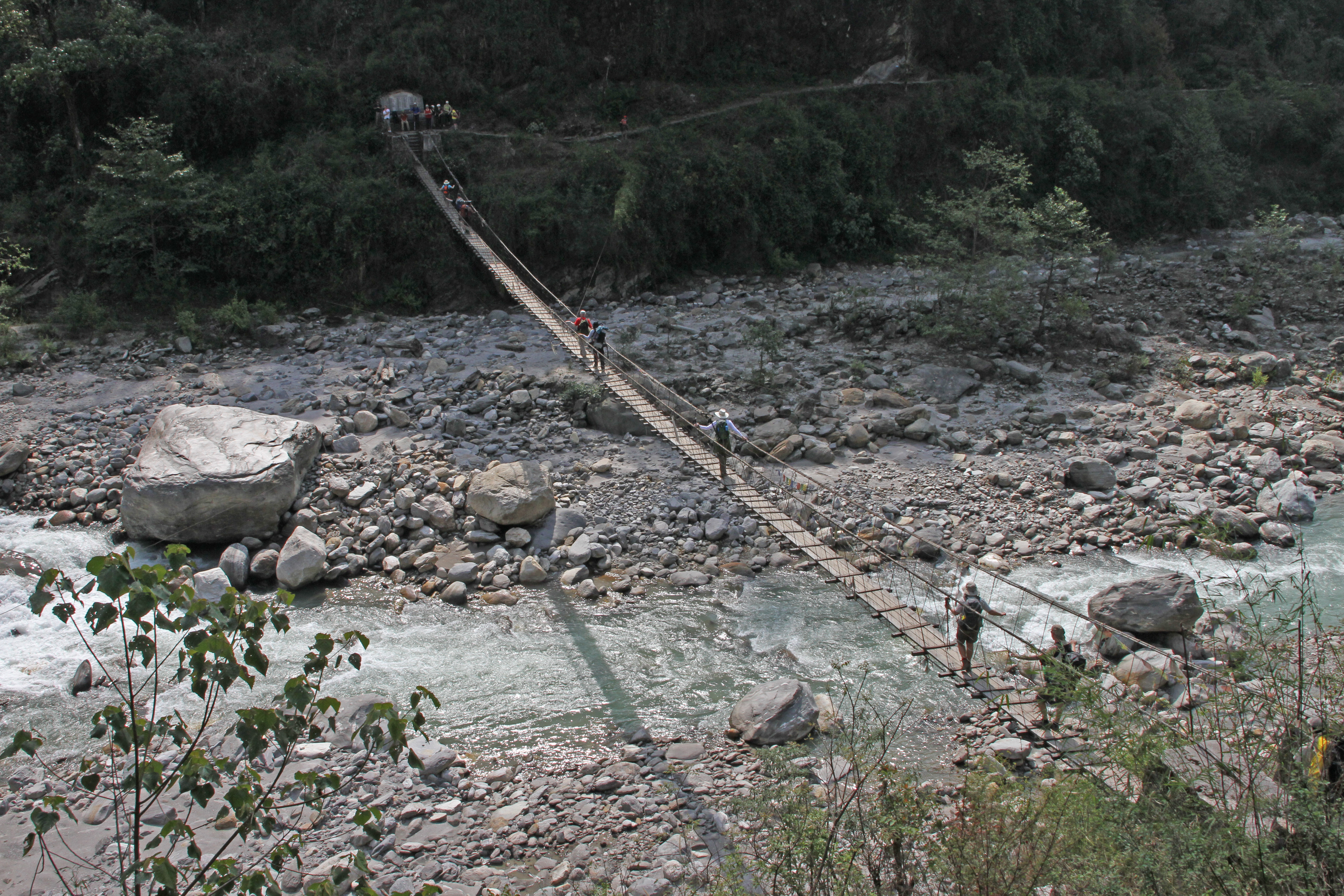
At Landruk

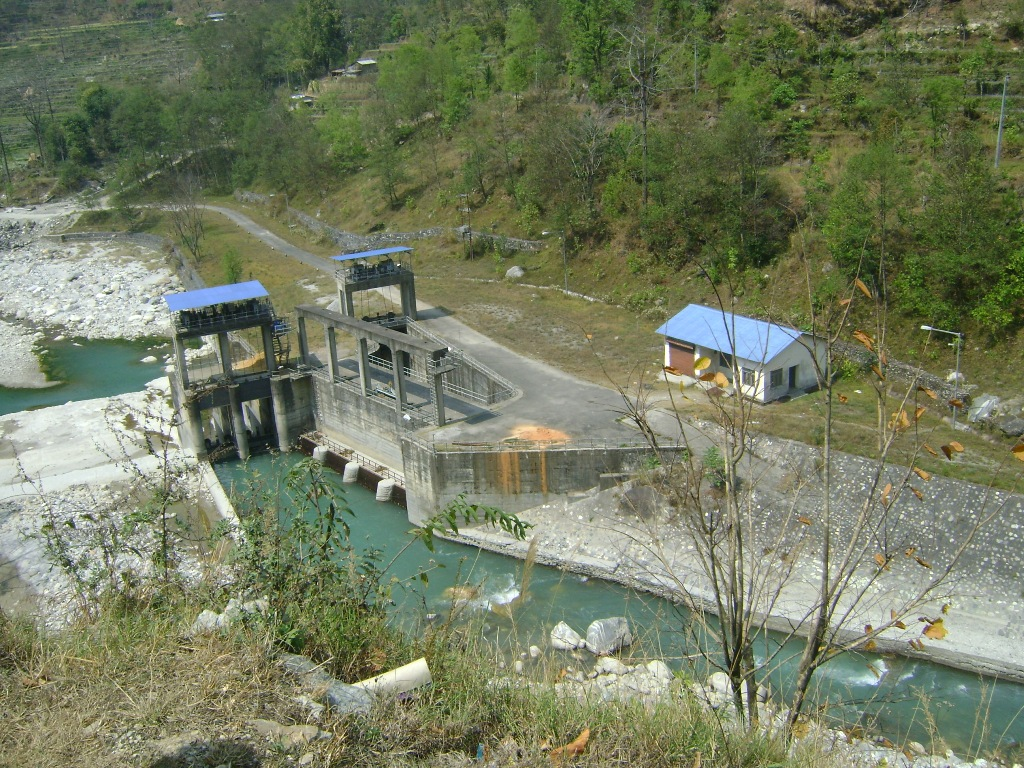
A Hydropower Intake

== See also ==
- Gandaki River
