= Lower Modi-1 Hydroelectric Power Plant =

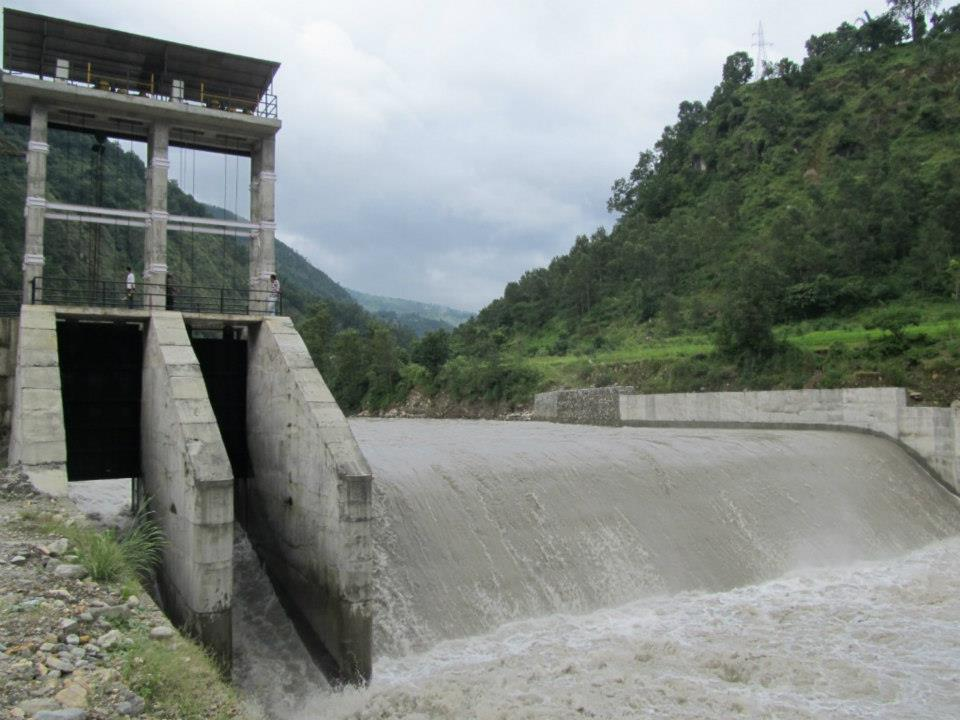

- Location within Nepal
- Official name: Lower Modi-1 Hydroelectric Power Plant
- Country: Nepal
- Location: Kusma, Parbat district
- Coordinates: 28.2199°N 83.6969°E
- Purpose: Power
- Status: Operational
- Owner: United Modi Hydropower Pvt. Ltd.

Dam and spillways
- Type of dam: Gravity
- Impounds: Modi River

Lower Modi-1 Hydroelectric Power Plant
- Coordinates: 28.2199°N 83.6969°E
- Commission date: 2069-08-09 BS
- Type: Run-of-the-river
- Hydraulic head: 50 m (160 ft)
- Turbines: 2 Francis-type turbines, Horizontal axis
- Installed capacity: 10 MW

Lower Modi-1 Hydroelectric Power Plant (Nepali: तल्लो मोदी १ जलविद्युत आयोजना, Tallo Modi-1 Jalbidyut Ayojana) is a run-of-river hydro-electric plant located in Parbat district of Nepal. The flow from Modi River is used to generate 10 MW electricity. The design flow is 26 m^{3}/s, gross head is 50 m and annual energy generation capacity is 61.01 GWh.

The plant was constructed by United Modi Hydropower Pvt. Ltd., an IPP of Nepal.

== See also ==
- Modi Khola Hydroelectric Power Plant, operated by Nepal Electricity Authority
- List of power stations in Nepal
