= Dhikur Pokhari =

Dhikurpokhari ढिकुरपोखरी Anna
- Former Village Development Committee
- Location in Nepal Dhikurpokhari (Nepal)
- Coordinates: 28.28°N 83.85°E
- Country: Nepal
- Zone: Gandaki Zone
- District: Kaski District

Population (1991)
  - Total: 7,392
- Time zone: UTC+5:45 (Nepal Time)

Dhikurpokhari is a suburb and former Village Development Committee in Kaski District in the Gandaki Province of northern-central Nepal. At the 1991 Nepal census, it had a population of 7,392 persons in 1,427 individual households.

Dhikurpokhari is surrounded by Machhapuchchhre Rural Municipality on the East, Myagdi district on the West, Manang District on the North and Parbat district, and Pokhara Metropolitan City on the South. It has a total area of 417.74 km2 (161.29 sq mi) and a population of 23,565 individuals, according to Nepal census 2011 (2068 BS). The population density of this Rural Municipality is 56.411/km2 (146.103/sq mi). This Rural Municipality is divided into 8 wards. This rural municipality lies 4528 feet above sea level. The Mid-Hill Highway(Pokhara-Baglung Segment) goes through the Dhikurpokhari.

There are views of the Annapurna range. It is the birthplace of current Prime Minister of Nepal, Prachanda.

== Wards ==
Ward number 8 of this VDC includes the village of Paudhur. It has more than hundred households.

Ward number 9 of Dhikur Pokhari includes the villages Serachaur, Thulachour and Saureni. This ward has more than 200 households, among which 100 households are located in Serachaur in a dense cluster of houses. Serachaur is one of the most educated villages of this VDC.
