= Beni, Myagdi =

Beni Municipality बेनी नगरपालिका Beni Bazaar
- Municipality
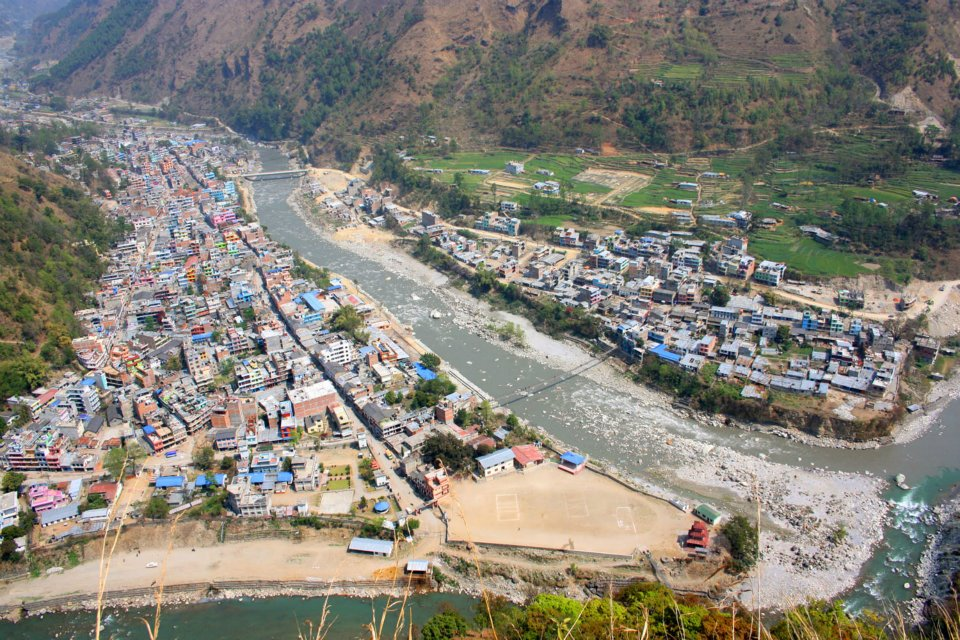
- Aerial view of Beni, 2012
- Motto(s): दुई खोलाको संगम (lit. Confluence of two rivers)
- Location in Nepal Beni Municipality (Nepal)
- Coordinates: 28°21′0″N 83°34′0″E
- Country: Nepal
- Province: Gandaki Province
- District: Myagdi District

Government
  - Mayor: Surat K.C. (CPN (UML))
  - Deputy Mayor: Jyoti Lamichhane (CPN (MC))

Area
  - Total: 52.77 km^{2} (20.37 sq mi)

Population (2011)
  - Total: 32,697 (census 2,021)
  - Density: 619.6/km^{2} (1,605/sq mi)
- Time zone: UTC+5:45 (NST)
- Postal code: 33200
- Area code: 069
- Website: http://benimun.gov.np/

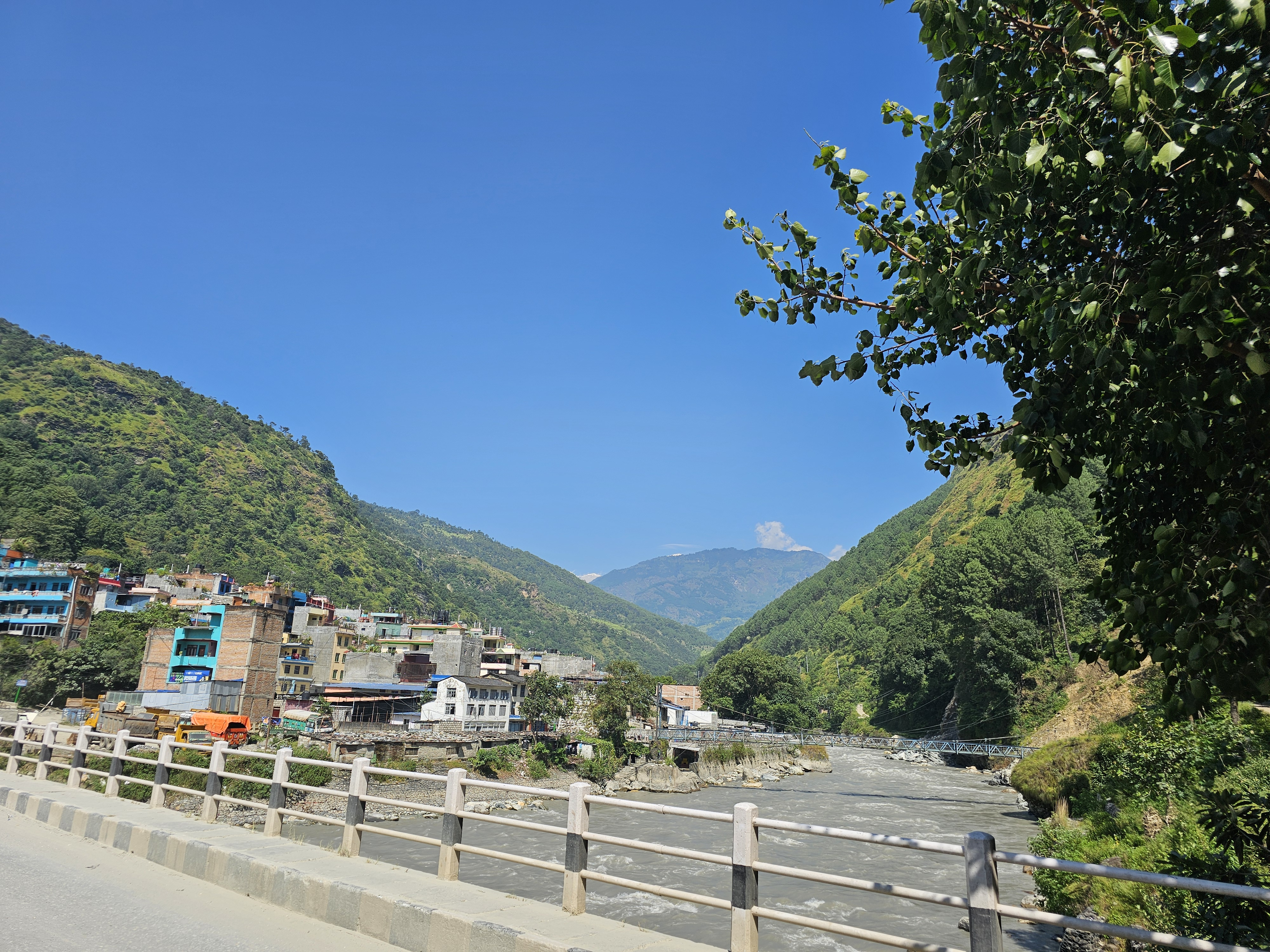
Kali Gandaki River. Bridge in Beni, Myagdi,

Beni is a municipality and the district headquarter of Myagdi District in Gandaki Province, Nepal. Municipality was announced by merging the then Ratnechaur, Jyamrukot, Arthunge, Pulachaur, Singa village development committees since 18 May 2014.

Beni is located at the confluence of the Kali Gandaki River and Myagdi River at an altitude of 899 meters. Being the northernmost of the Tri-cities area of Nepal, it is located 12 km to the north of Zonal headquarters Baglung. It is mainly divided into two parts by the Kali Gandaki River. The Western Part lies in Myagdi District and the main offices lie there. The other part lies in Parbat District and is relatively small.

== Demographics ==
As per the Census 2021, Beni Municipality has a population of 32,697. Of these, 95.9% speak Nepali, 1.06% Nepalbhasha (Newari), 0.7% Magar Dhut, 0.4% Bhojpuri, 0.4% Gurung, 0.4% Chhantyal, 0.3% Hindi, 0.2% Magar kham, 0.1% Maithili out of major ten mother tongues.

In terms of ethnicity/caste, 30% Chhetri, 22% Magar, 12.2% Hill Brahmin, 8.8% Pariyar, 7.9% Bishwokarma, 7.3% Mijar, 3.4% Newar, 2.2% Thakuri, 1.9% Chhantyal, 0.9% Gurung out of major ten caste/ethnic groups.

In terms of religion, 93.9% are Hindu, 3% Buddhist, 0.5% Muslim,0.9% Christian, 1.02% Prakriti, and 0.6% others.

Overall literacy rate is 83.2% where literacy rate of male is 91.1% and female is 76.4%.

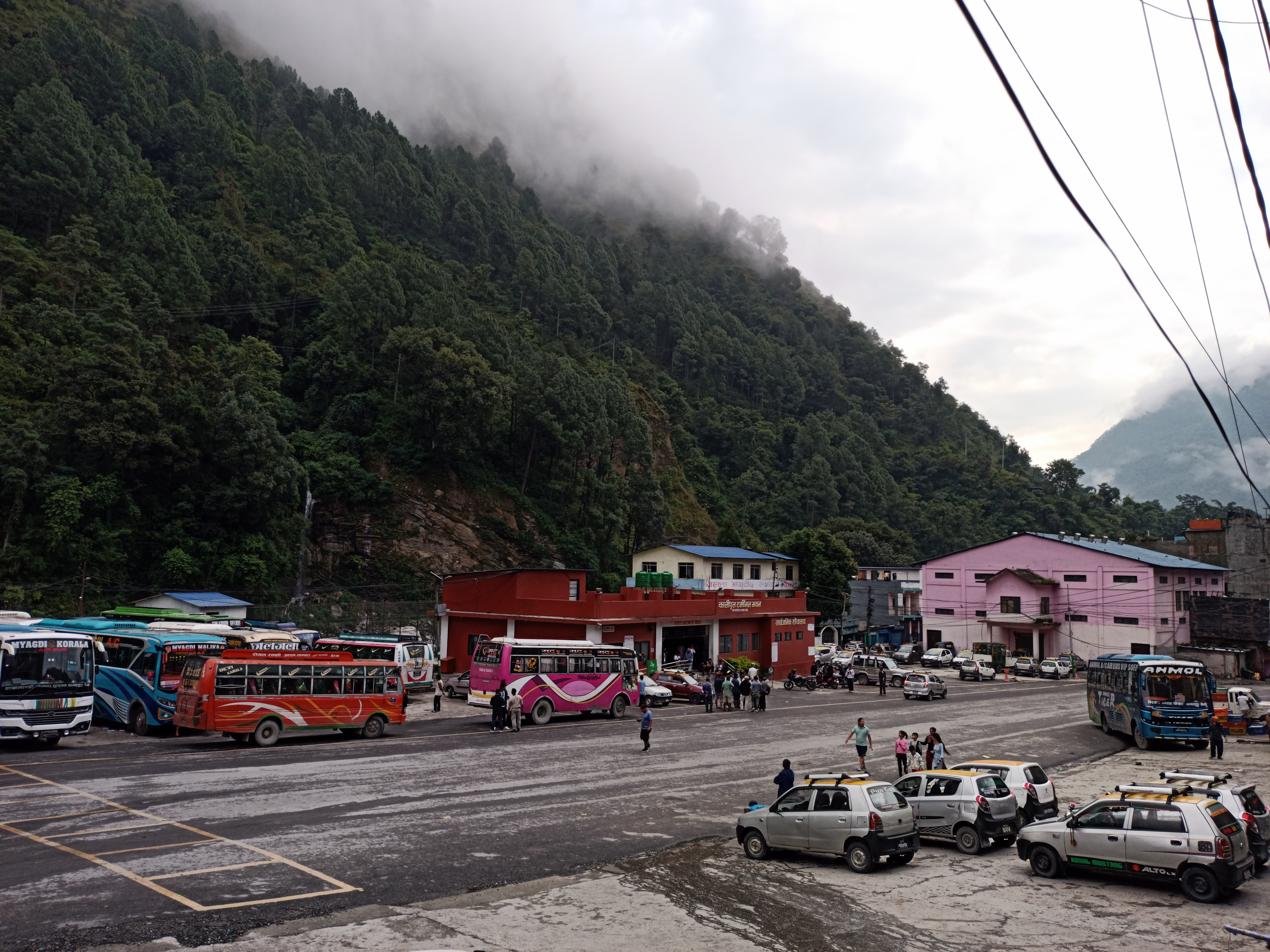
Beni Bus Park

== Pictures ==
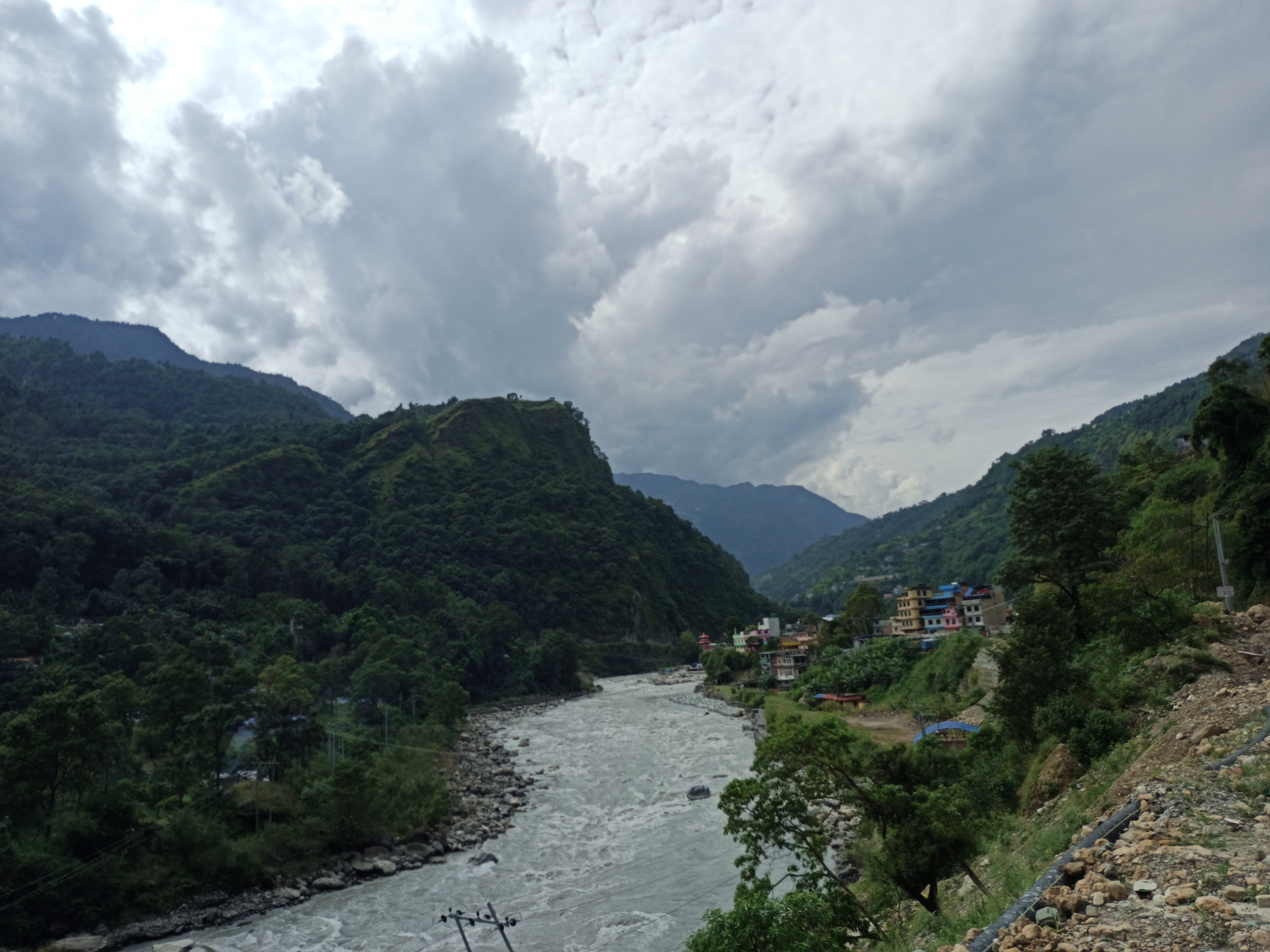
Beni in 2025

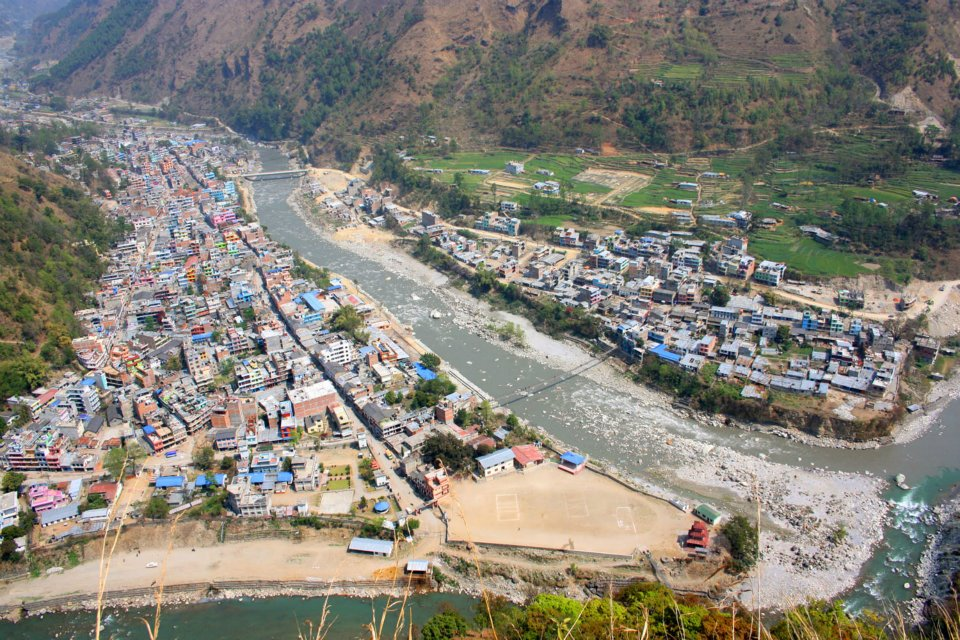

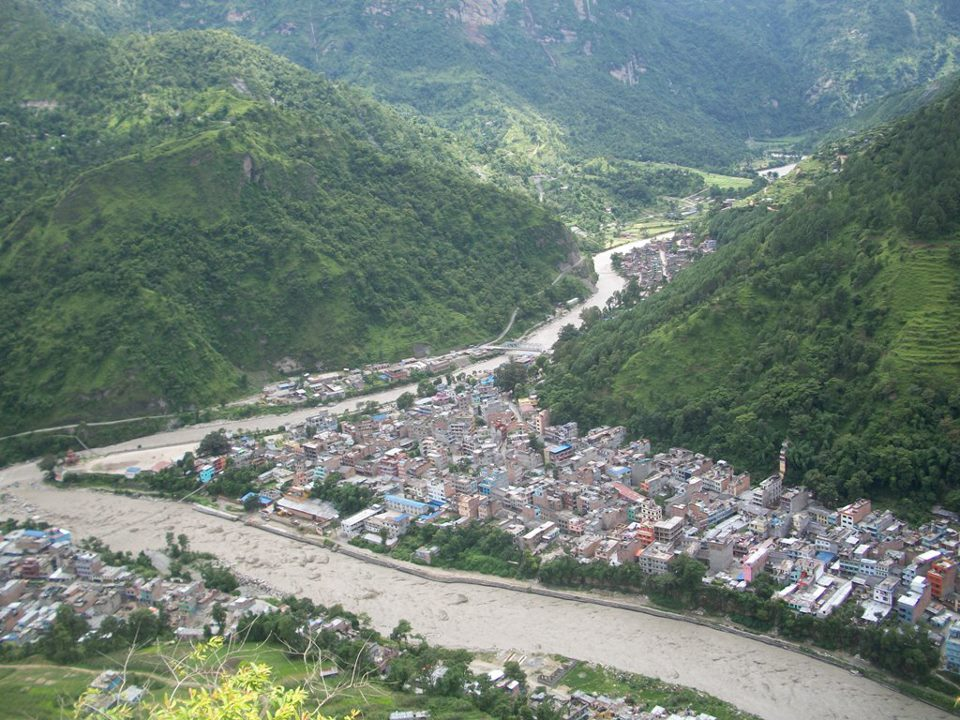

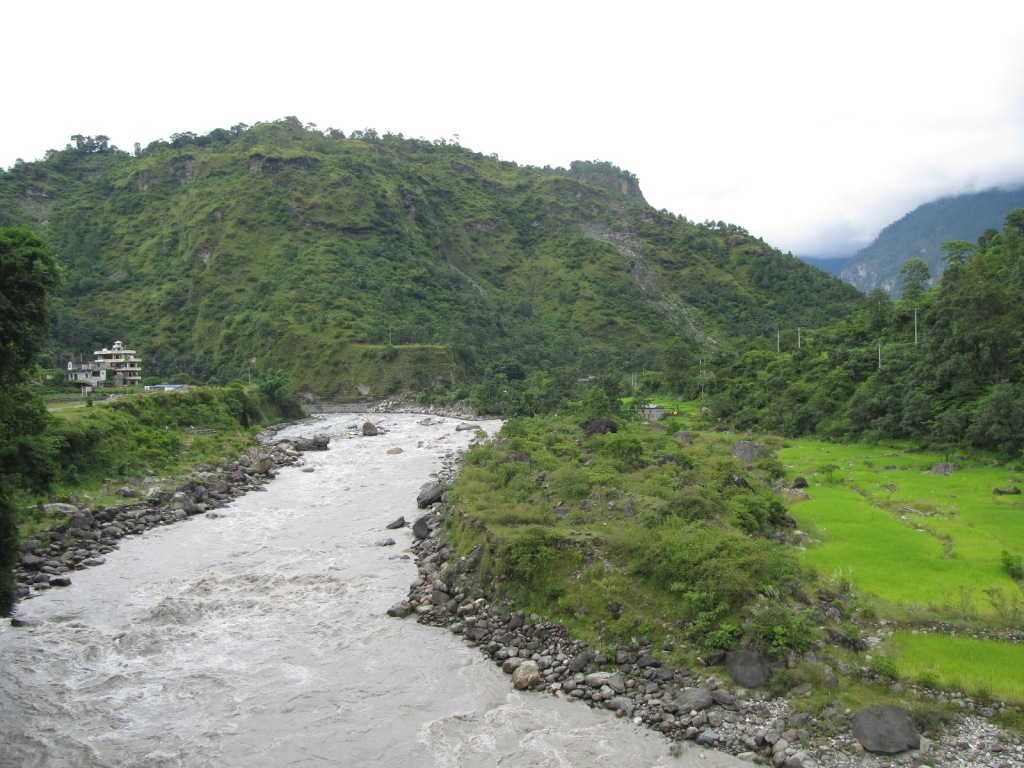
Upstream of Galeshwor temple

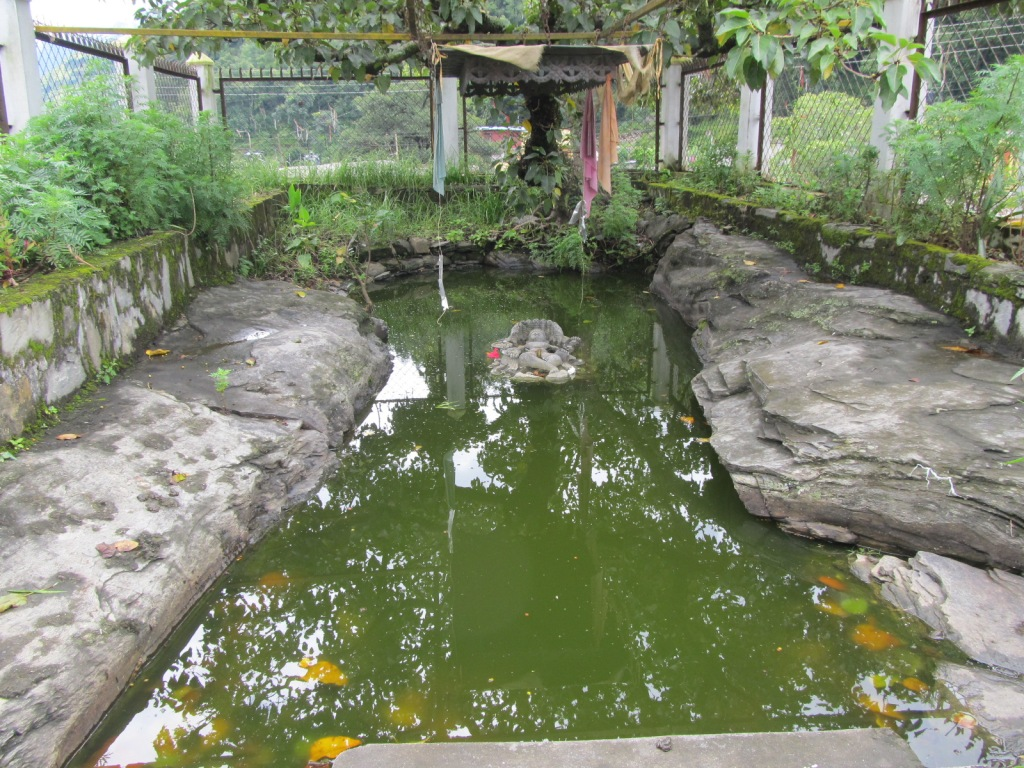
Vishnu in Galeshwor temple

== See also ==
- 2004 Beni attack
