= Patichaur =

Town in Parbat District, Nepal

Patichaur is the second biggest town of Parbat District, Nepal. It is a famous destination for delicious fish of Modi river, Modi Beni and hydro power stations visit.
