= Kushma =

Municipality in Gandaki Province, Nepal

KUSHMA Municipality कुश्मा नगरपालिका
- Municipality
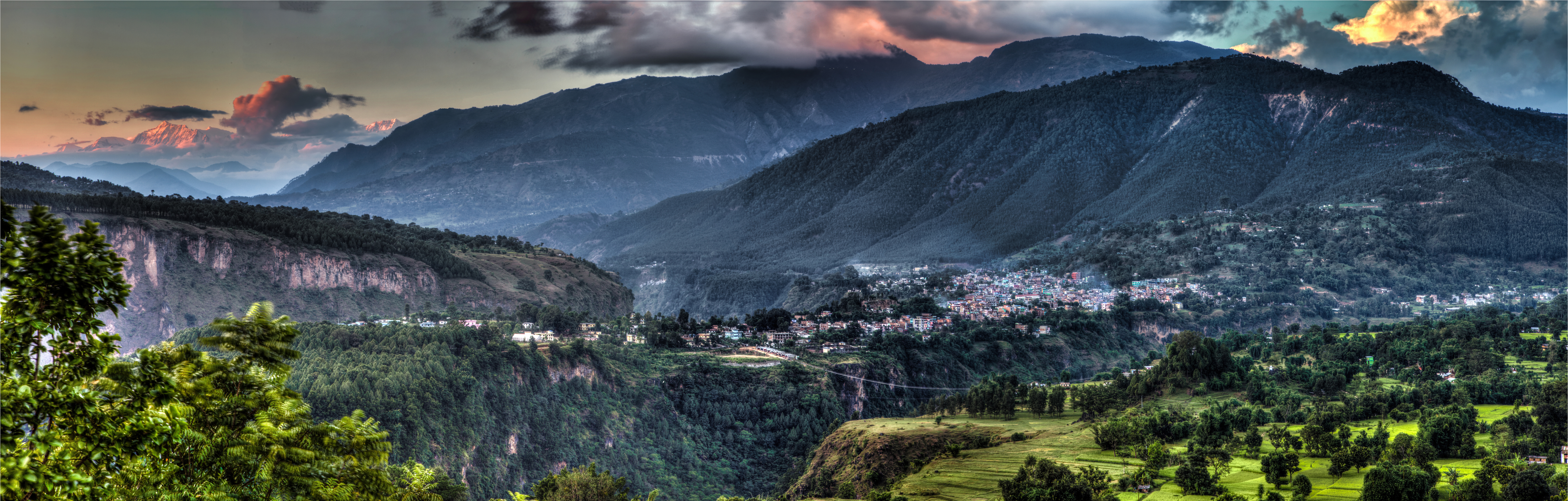

- Location in Nepal KUSHMA Municipality (Nepal)
- Coordinates: 28.23°N 83.69°E
- Country: Nepal
- Province: Gandaki Province
- District: Parbat District
- Settled: 18 May 2014

Government
  - Mayor: Ram Chandra Joshi (NC)
  - Deputy Mayor: Swasthani Rijal

Population (2011)
  - Total: 6,758
- Time zone: UTC+5:45 (NST)
- Website: http://kushmamun.gov.np
- Kushma and various other sources in the mountain terrains of Nepal.

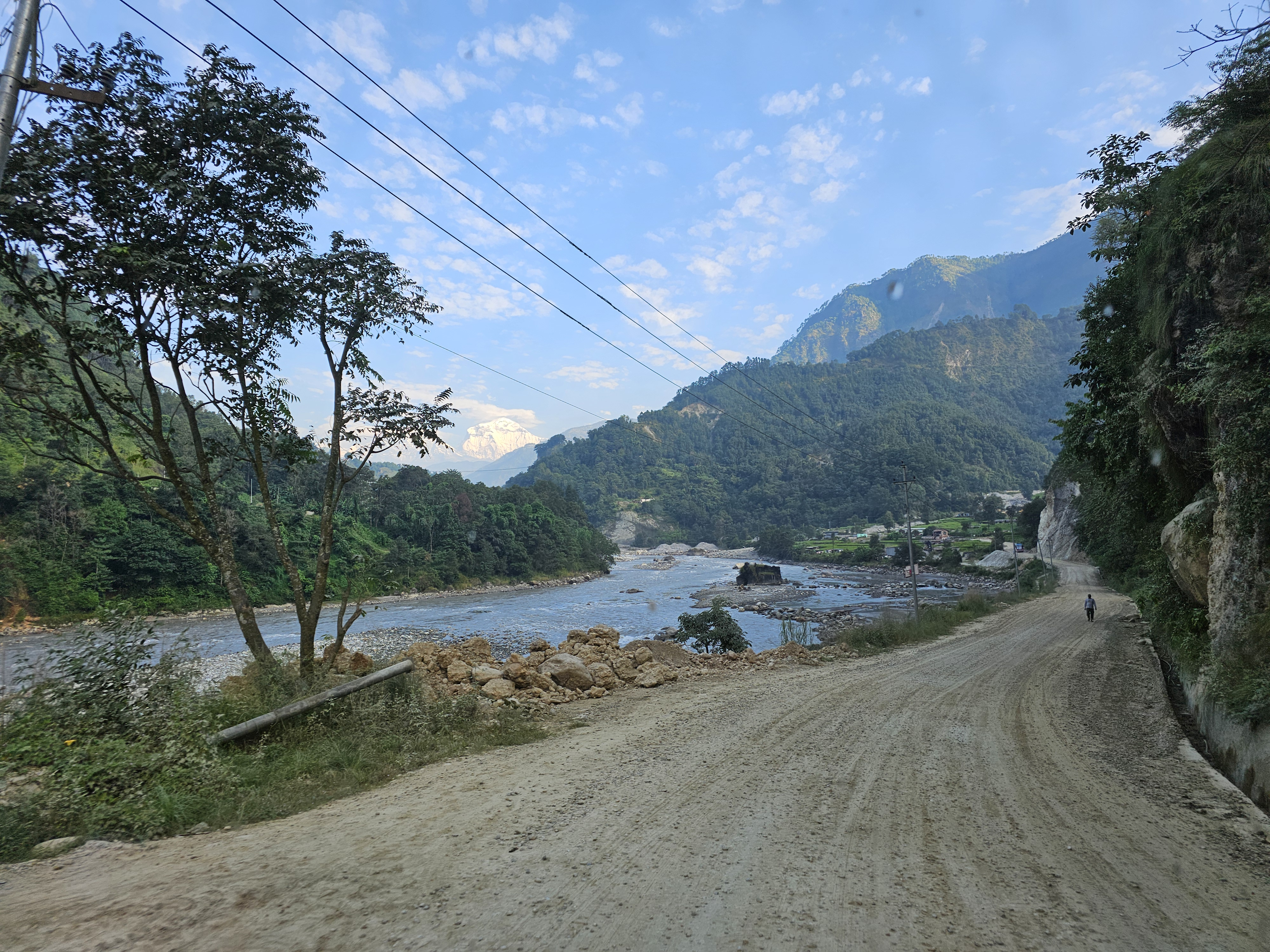
Kali Gandaki River near Kushma Nepal

Kushma is a small city and the headquarter of Parbat District in Nepal. Kushma municipality was formed by merging eight (8) village development committees Pang, Khurkot, Durlung, Shivalaya, Chuwa, Katuwa Chaupari, Pipaltari and Pakuwa on 18 May 2014.

This city lies in the western part of Nepal just about 57 km from Pokhara and 12 km from Baglung. Kushma falls under Western Development Region and Dhaulagiri Zone of Nepal. It is located at 28°13'06N 83°40'45E at an altitude of 1290 meters. Kusma Bazaar straddling a narrow and high strip of land between the banks of Kaligandaki and Modi is the main market centre of the municipality. A bridge joins Kushma with Gyadichour located on the other side of the deep Modi river canyon.

== History ==
From early times Kusma has been an important stop for travellers from Baglung on their way to Pokhara, Palpa and Butwal. Businesses catering to these travelers started to spring up leading to the establishment of a small market. As more settlers arrived Kusma was declared the headquarters of Parbat district.

== Demographics ==
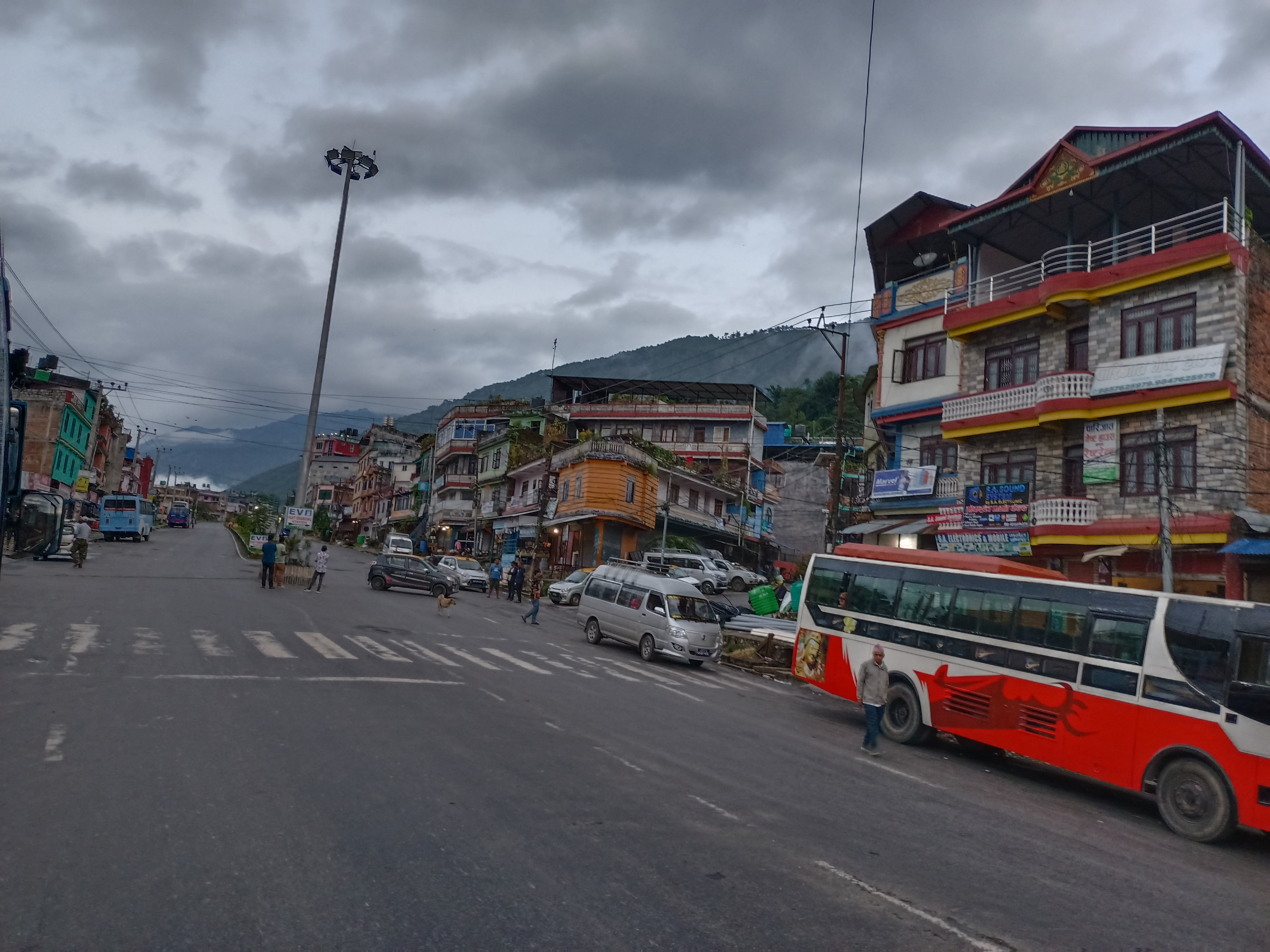
Kushma Bazar

At the time of the 2011 Nepal census, Kushma Municipality had a population of 40,374. Of these, 94.9% spoke Nepali, 2.8% Gurung, 1.1% Newar, 0.3% Magar, 0.2% Maithili, 0.2% Bhojpuri, 0.1% Hindi, 0.1% Tamang and 0.3% other languages as their first language.

In terms of ethnicity/caste, 42.0% were Hill Brahmin, 13.9% Chhetri, 9.1% Sarki, 8.6% Kami, 7.6% Damai/Dholi, 4.2% Magar, 3.7% Gurung, 3.6% Newar, 2.9% Sanyasi/Dasnami and 4.4% others.

In terms of religion, 93.9% were Hindu, 4.8% Buddhist, 0.7% Muslim, 0.4% Christian and 0.2% others.

== Transportation ==
Kushma Bazaar is linked with the national road network by Pokhara Baglung Highway. Buses are the primary means of transportation in Kushma. Small size automobiles and jeeps are used for cab services within Kushma Bazar and surrounding settlements. Motorbikes are popular among the youth. Ownership of private cars in Kushma has increased in recent years. The Baglung Airport located across the Kaligandaki river in Balewa of Baglung provided air travel before its closing. Now re-opening of the airport is under consideration. Recently a cable car bridge has come into operation connecting Kushma Bazar and Balewa reducing two long hours of walking to a five-minute ride.

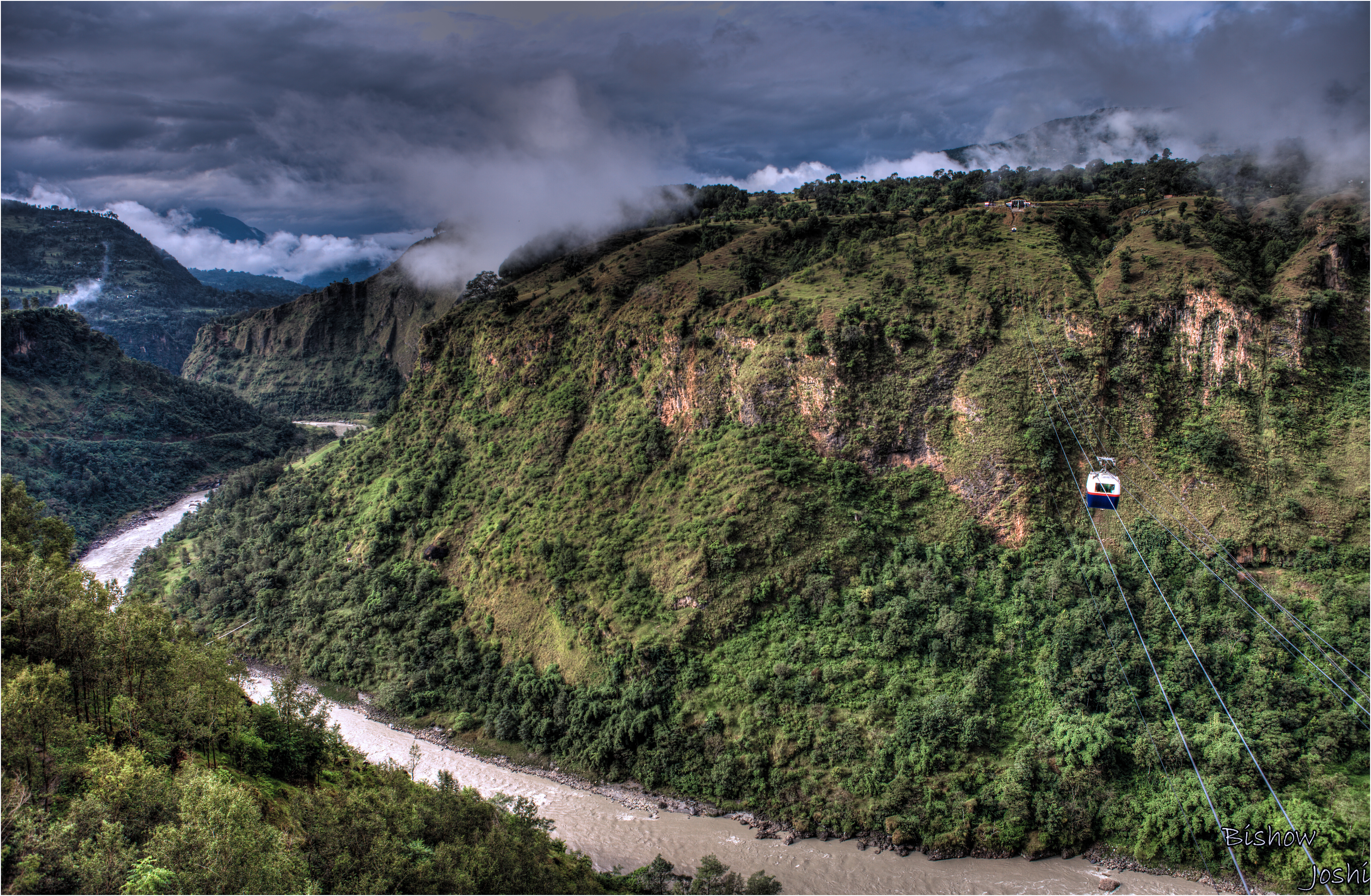
The mechanized bridge connecting Kushma to Balewa.

== Climate ==
Climate data for Kushma, elevation 900 m (3,000 ft), (1991–2020 normals)
Month	Jan	Feb	Mar	Apr	May	Jun	Jul	Aug	Sep	Oct	Nov	Dec	Year
Mean daily maximum °C (°F)	21.5 (70.7)	24.0 (75.2)	28.3 (82.9)	31.6 (88.9)	31.9 (89.4)	32.2 (90.0)	31.2 (88.2)	31.3 (88.3)	31.2 (88.2)	30.1 (86.2)	26.8 (80.2)	23.1 (73.6)	28.6 (83.5)
Daily mean °C (°F)	13.9 (57.0)	16.6 (61.9)	20.5 (68.9)	23.8 (74.8)	25.2 (77.4)	26.6 (79.9)	26.5 (79.7)	26.6 (79.9)	25.9 (78.6)	23.2 (73.8)	21.4 (70.5)	15.3 (59.5)	22.1 (71.8)
Mean daily minimum °C (°F)	6.3 (43.3)	9.1 (48.4)	12.7 (54.9)	16.0 (60.8)	18.4 (65.1)	21.0 (69.8)	21.8 (71.2)	21.9 (71.4)	20.6 (69.1)	16.2 (61.2)	11.4 (52.5)	7.5 (45.5)	15.2 (59.4)
Average precipitation mm (inches)	22.1 (0.87)	27.2 (1.07)	34.8 (1.37)	71.0 (2.80)	167.6 (6.60)	412.4 (16.24)	677.9 (26.69)	580.7 (22.86)	351.5 (13.84)	84.7 (3.33)	8.7 (0.34)	15.5 (0.61)	2,454.1 (96.62)
Source 1: Department of Hydrology and Meteorology
Source 2: JICA (precipitation)

== See also ==
- Katuwa Chaupari
- Parbat District
- Nepal
- Patichaur
- Gupteswor Cave, Parbat
- Khurkot
