= Sonpur, Nepal =

Sonpur, Nepal सोनपुर
- Village Development Committee
- Location in Nepal
- Coordinates: 27.88°N 82.60°E
- Country: Nepal
- Province: Lumbini Province
- District: Dang Deokhuri District

Population (1991)
  - Total: 8,650
- Time zone: UTC+5:45 (Nepal Time)

Sonpur is a town and Village Development Committee in Dang Deokhuri District in Lumbini Province of south-western Nepal. At the time of the 1991 Nepal census it had a population of 8,650 persons living in 1129 individual households.

Since September 2015 Sonpur has been part of Lamahi Municipality.
