= Pokhara Baglung Highway =

Road in Nepal

National Highway 15
- राष्ट्रिय राजमार्ग १५
- Pokhara–Baglung Highway (Bhupi Sherchan Highway)
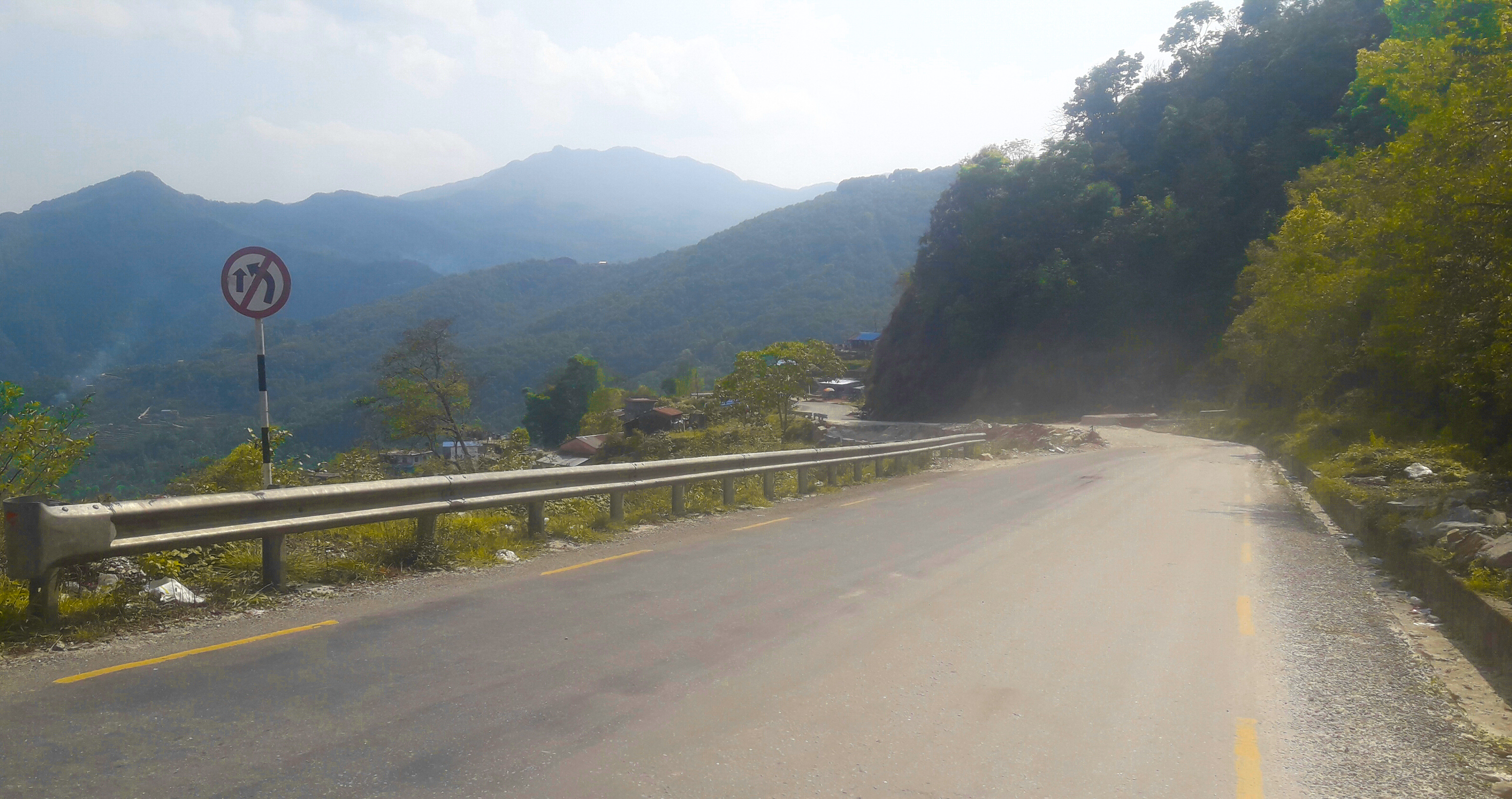

Route information
- Maintained by MoPIT (Department of Roads)
- Length: 72 km (45 mi)

Major junctions
- From: Zero Kilometer, Pokhara
- Kushma; Nayapul (Kaski); Dimuwa; Maldhunga (Parbat); Puranozar; Armadi; Chhamarke
- To: Baglung

Location
- Country: Nepal

Highway system
- Roads in Nepal

The Pokhara–Baglung Highway (also known as the Bhupi Sherchan Highway) is a 72-kilometre (45 mi) short highway that begins at Zero Kilometer in Pokhara and terminates at Baglung Municipality. It forms a vital section of the larger, 1,756-kilometre (1,091 mi) national pride road network in Nepal.
