= Gandaki River =

River in Nepal and India

Gandaki River Narayani
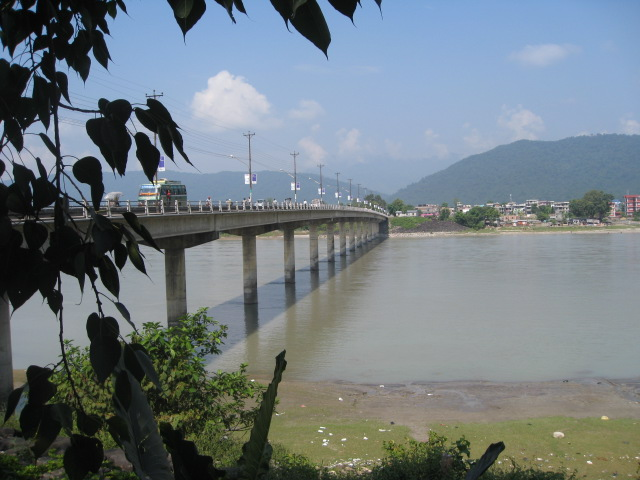
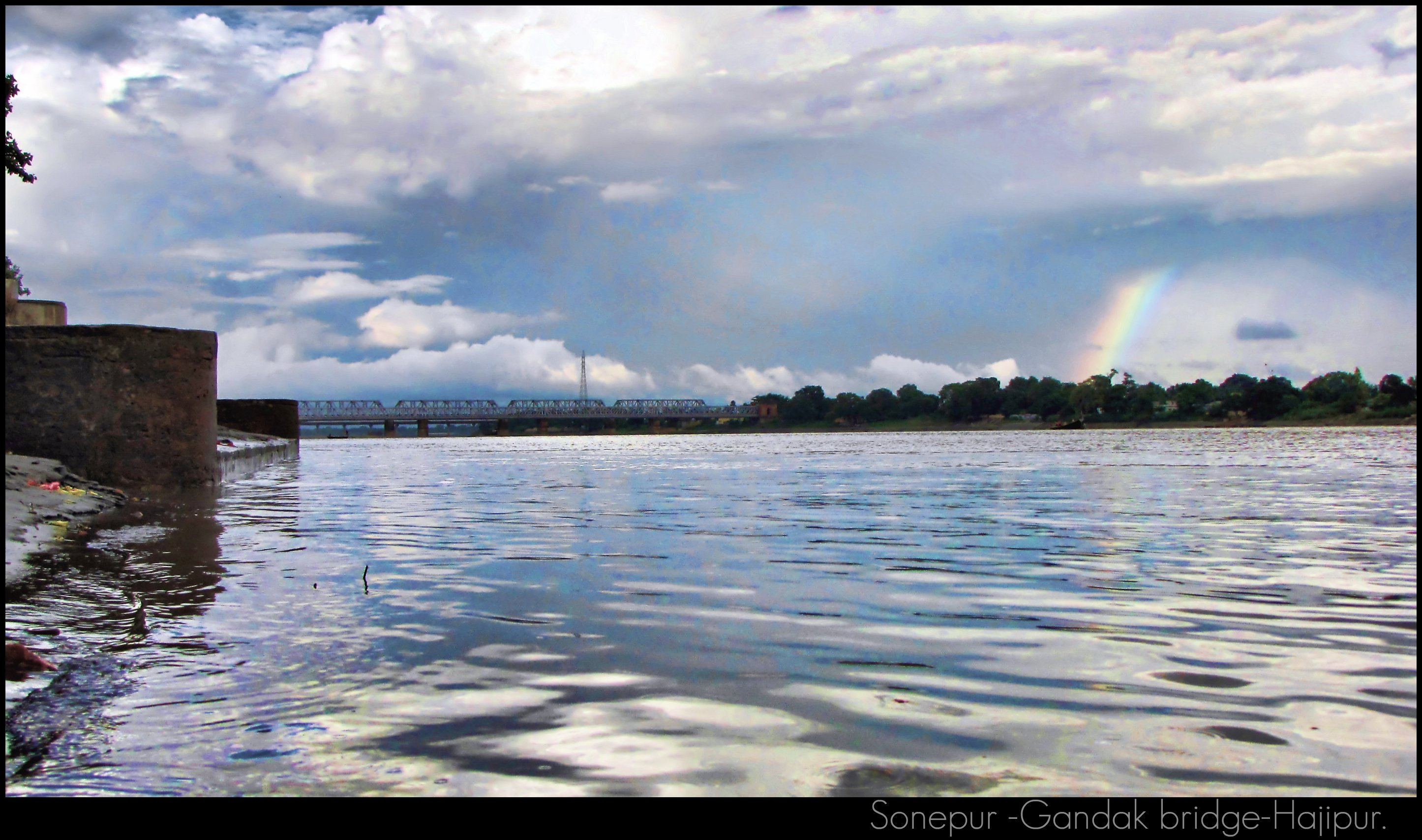
- From top: Narayani River in Chitwan, Gandak River in Hajipur, Gandak River in Nepal, The Gandak River Barrage in West Champaran Bihar. Anoma River in Buddhist Era

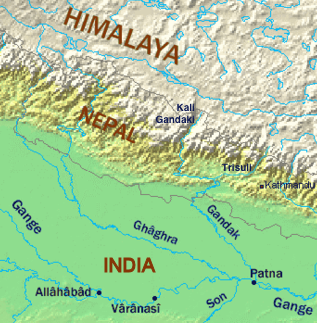
- Map showing the Ghaghara and Gandaki tributaries of the Ganges

Location
- Country: Nepal, India
- Cities: Lo Manthang, Jomsom, Beni, Baglung, Kusma, Pokhara, Gorkha, Ridi, Devghat, Narayangarh, Valmikinagar, Triveni, Nepal, Hajipur, Sonpur, Muzaffarpur, Bagaha

Physical characteristics
- Source: Nhubine Himal Glacier
  - location: Mustang District, Nepal
  - coordinates: 29°17′19″N 83°52′39″E
  - elevation: 6,268 m (20,564 ft)
- Mouth: Ganges
  - location: Sonpur, India
  - coordinates: 25°39′9″N 85°11′4″E
  - elevation: 44 m (144 ft)
- Length: 814 km (506 mi)
- Basin size: 46,300 km^{2} (17,900 sq mi)
- Discharge
  - average: 2,025 m^{3}/s (71,500 cu ft/s)
  - minimum: 500 m^{3}/s (18,000 cu ft/s)
  - maximum: 30,000 m^{3}/s (1,100,000 cu ft/s)

Basin features
- Tributaries
  - left: Trishuli
  - right: Kali Gandaki

The Gandaki River, also known as the Narayani and Gandak, is one of the major rivers in Nepal and a left-bank tributary of the Ganges in India. In the Vedic text Shatapatha Brahmana, it is mentioned as Sadanira. Its total catchment area is 46,300 km^{2} (17,900 sq mi), most of it in Nepal. In the Nepal Himalayas, the Gandaki is notable for its deep canyon. The basin also contains three mountains over 8,000 m (26,000 ft), namely Dhaulagiri, Manaslu and Annapurna Massif. Dhaulagiri is the highest point of the Gandaki basin. In its upper reaches, the river is known as Kali Gandaki (or Gandaki) as it flows through the Mustang District and the famous Kali Gandaki Gorge in Nepal. When the river reaches the Terai plains of Nepal, it is referred to as the Narayani River. This name change typically occurs near the confluence with the Trishuli River at Devghat in Chitwan. Upon entering India, the river is known as the Gandak River.

== River course ==
=== Nepal ===
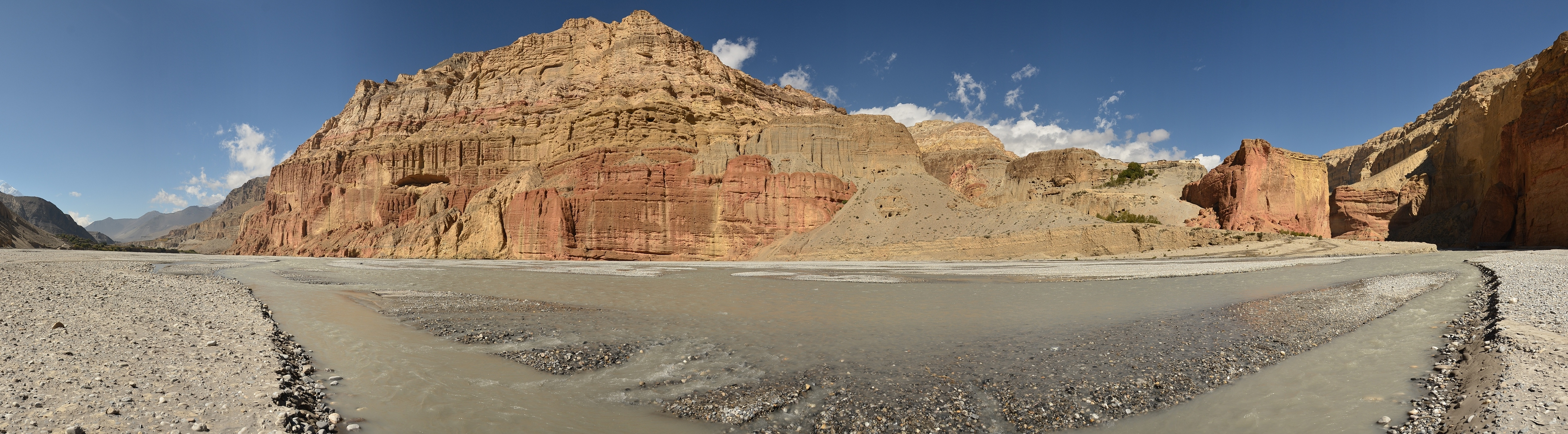
Panorama of the Kali Gandaki gorge in Upper Mustang

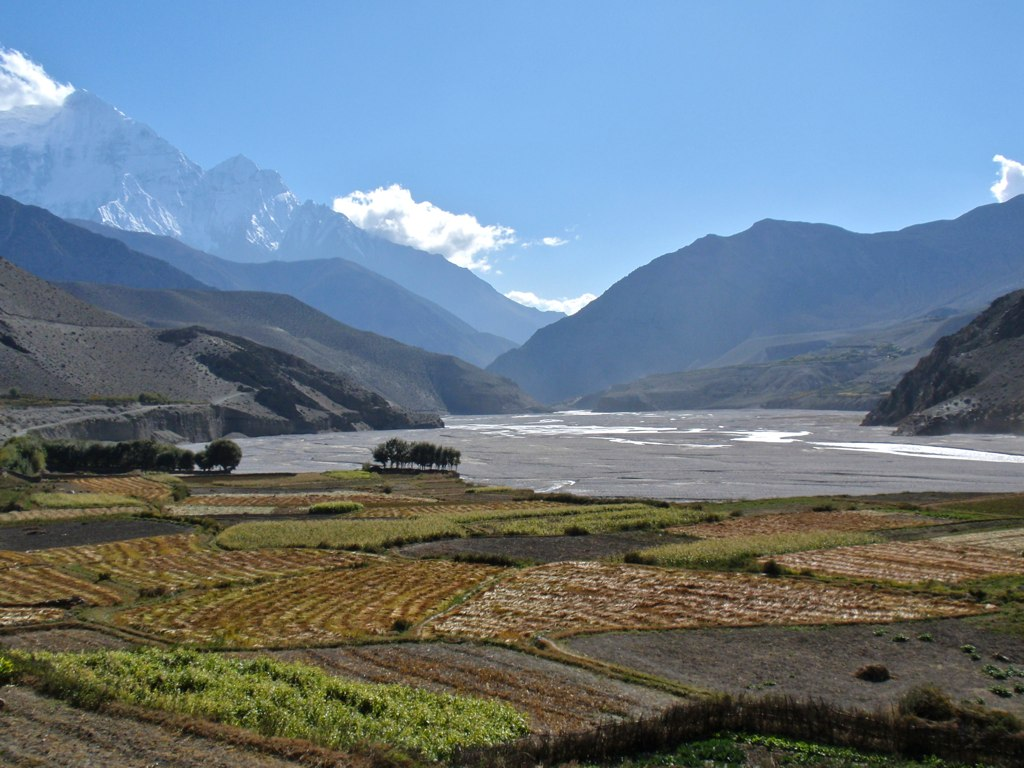
River Gandaki in Kagbeni, Nepal

The Kali Gandaki river source is at the border with Tibet at an elevation of 6,268 m (20,564 ft) at the Nhubine Himal Glacier in the Mustang region of Nepal.

The headwater stream on some maps is named the Chhuama Khola and then, nearing Lo Manthang, the Nhichung Khola or Choro Khola. The Kali Gandaki then flows southwest (with the name of Mustang Khola on old, outdated maps) through a sheer-sided, deep canyon before widening at the steel footbridge at Chele, where part of its flow funnels through a rock tunnel, and from this point the now wide river is called the Kali Gandaki on all maps. In Kagbeni a major tributary named Johng Khola, Kak Khola or Krishnaa descends from Muktinath.

The river then flows southward through a steep gorge known as the Kali Gandaki Gorge, or Andha Galchi, between the mountains Dhaulagiri, elevation 8,167 m (26,795 ft) to the west and Annapurna, elevation 8,091 m (26,545 ft) to the east. If one measures the depth of a canyon by the difference between the river height and the heights of the highest peaks on either side, this gorge is the world's second deepest after the Yarlung Tsangpo Grand Canyon (ca. 6000 m). The portion of the river directly between Dhaulagiri and Annapurna I, 7 km (4.3 mi) downstream from Tukuche), is at an elevation of 2,520 m (8,270 ft), which is 5,571 m (18,278 ft) lower than Annapurna I. The river is older than the Himalayas. As tectonic activity forces the mountains higher, the river has cut through the uplift. South of the gorge, the river is joined by Rahughat Khola at Galeshwor, Myagdi Khola at Beni, Modi Khola near Kushma and Badigaad at Rudrabeni above Ridi Bazaar. The river then turns east to run along the northern edge of the Mahabharat Range. One of the largest hydroelectricity project in Nepal is located along this stretch of the river. Turning south again and breaking through the Mahabharats, Kali Gandaki is then joined by a major tributary, the Trishuli, at Devghat, which is larger than the Kali Gandaki. Gandaki is then joined by the East Rapti River draining the Inner Terai valley known as Chitwan. The Gandaki then crosses the Sivalik Hills into the Terai plains of Nepal. From Devghat, the river flows southwest of Gaindakot town. The river later curves back towards the southeast as it enters India where it is called the Gandak.

Below Gaindakot the river is known as the Narayani or Sapt Gandaki (Seven Gandakis), for seven tributaries rising in the Himalaya or further north along the main Ganges-Brahmaputra divide. These are the Kali Gandaki, the Trishuli River, and the five main tributaries of the Trishuli known as the Daraudi, Seti, Madi, Marshyangdi and Budhi Gandaki.

=== India ===
The entry point of the river at the Indo–Nepal border is also the confluence called Triveni with the rivers Pachnad and Sonha descending from Nepal. Pandai river flows into Bihar from Nepal in the eastern end of the Valmiki Sanctuary and meets Masan. The Gandak enters India at first in Maharajganj District of Uttar Pradesh for around 25 km (16 mi); it also passes through Kushinagar District before entering Bihar. The Gandak flows southeast 300 km (190 mi) across the Gangetic plain of Bihar state through West Champaran, Gopalganj, East Champaran, Saran, Muzaffarpur and Vaishali districts.

From its exit from the outermost Siwaliks foothills to the Ganga, the Gandak has built an immense megafan comprising Eastern Uttar Pradesh and North Western Bihar in the Middle Gangetic Plains.

== Glaciers, glacial lakes and glacial lake outburst floods ==
Glacier lakes, among the most hazardous features of high mountains, are usually formed behind dams of moraine debris left behind by retreating glaciers, a trend that is observed all over the world. Even though glacial lake outburst flood (GLOF) events have been occurring in Nepal for many decades, the Dig Tsho glacier outburst, which took place in 1985, has triggered detailed study of this phenomenon. In 1996, the Water and Energy Commission Secretariat (WECS) of Nepal reported that five lakes were potentially dangerous, namely, Dig Tsho, Imja, Lower Barun, Tsho Rolpa, and Thulagi, all lying above 4,100 m (13,500 ft). A recent study done by ICIMOD and UNEP (UNEP, 2001) reported 27 potentially dangerous lakes in Nepal. In ten of them GLOF events have occurred in the past few years and some have been regenerating after the event.

The Thulagi glacier, located in the Upper Marsyangdi River basin, is one out of the two moraine-dammed lakes that was identified as a potentially dangerous lake as it may outburst.

== Important towns ==
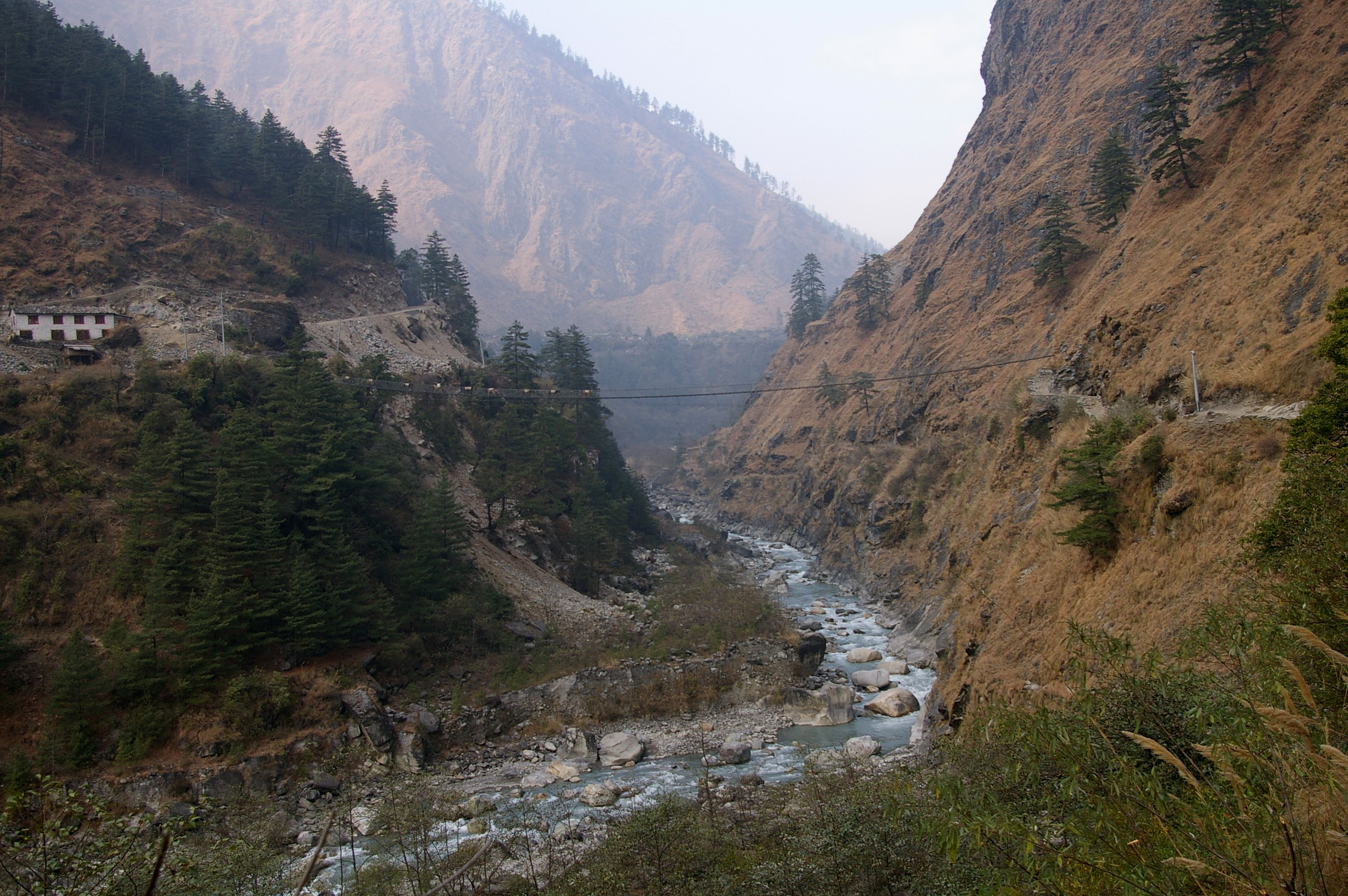
Kali Gandaki River near Ghasa, between Annapurna and Dhaulagiri

The important towns in the Indian part of the Gandak river are Valmikinagar (Bhainsalotan) - location of Gandak Barrage, Bagaha, Bettiah (district headquarters & field directorate of Valmiki Tiger Project), Harinagar (Ramnagar), Hajipur (across the Ganges 10 km from Patna) and Sonepur (also Known as Harihar Kshetra), near Patna.

== National Parks ==
Chitwan National Park of Nepal and Valmiki National Park of India are adjacent to each other in the vicinity of Valmikinagar around the Gandak Barrage.

=== Chitwan National Park ===
Chitwan National Park
- IUCN category II (national park)
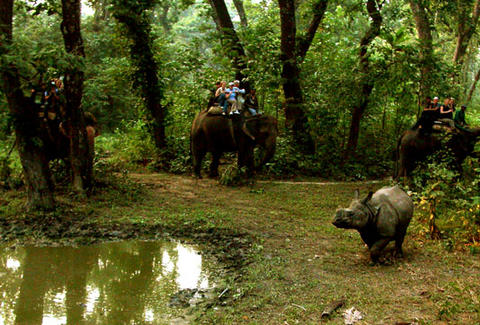
- Tourists on elephants observing Indian rhinoceros
- Interactive map of Chitwan National Park

Chitwan National Park covers an area of 932 square kilometres (360 mi^{2}). Established in 1973, it is the oldest national park of Nepal. It was granted the status of a World Heritage Site in 1984. It is located in Chitwan, one of the Inner Terai Valleys of Nepal. The park is rich in flora and fauna, including Bengal Tigers and one of the last populations of single-horned Indian rhinoceros (Rhinoceros unicornis). The area used to be known as the Chitwan Valley. It was a place for big game hunting and until 1951 it was a hunting reserve. At the park there is canoeing, elephant rides, and guided jungle walks.

=== Valmiki National Park ===
Valmiki Sanctuary covers about 800 square kilometres (310 mi^{2}) of forest and was the 18th tiger reserve established in India. It is ranked fourth in terms density of tiger population. Valmikinagar is located nearly 100 kilometres (62 mi) from Bettiah in the northernmost part of the West Champaran district, Bihar, bordering Nepal. Valmikinagar is a small town with scattered habitation, mostly within the forest area and has a railroad station in the district of West Champaran, close to the railhead of Bagaha. It has diverse landscapes, sheltering rich wildlife habitats and floral and faunal composition with the prime protected carnivores and was included in the National Conservation Programme of the Project Tiger in the year 1994. According to a 1998 report by the Zoological Survey of India, the sanctuary has 53 mammals, 145 birds, 26 reptile and 13 amphibians and a Tiger Reserve.

The notable species of wild fauna include: tiger, leopard, wild dog, wild boar, bison, bear, peacock, partridge, hornbill, hill mynah, woolly-necked stork, python, crocodile, deer, sambar, blue bull, barking deer, hog deer.

As per the Botanical Survey of India report of 1998 there are seven types of vegetation consisting of seven classes of forests; home to 84 species of trees (subtropical trees such as sal, sagwan, bamboo, and cane), 32 shrubs and climbers and 81 herbs and grasses.

== Religious significance ==
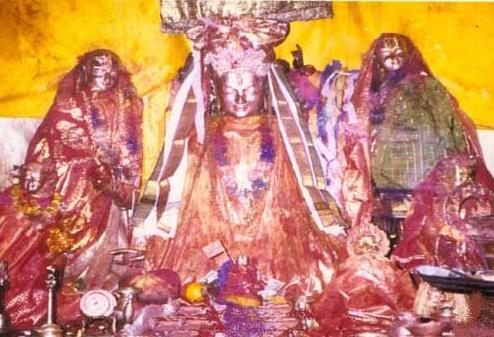
Muktinath Vaishnava temple idols, Nepal

Between the Dhaulagiri and Annapurna mountain ranges, the Gandaki River flows through the village of Muktinath and by the Ashram of Pulaha. In ancient times, the mountain range surrounding Pulaha was called Salagiris due to the vast forests of sal trees. The stones found in this region are therefore called Saligrama – Silas. It has great significance to Hindus, particularly to Brahmins. Smarthas uses this as the replica of lord Narayana. Srivaisnavas, and Madhvacharya sects who consider the place where one can find saligrama silas in the river bed of the Gandaki River, and the Mukthinath temple as one of the 108 Divyakshetrams.

== Places of archaeological significance ==
Gandaki River in Marpha, Mustang District, Nepal

Archaeologically important places around Valmikinagar are Lauriya-Nandangarh and Someshwar Fort. In Lauria block, about 1 km east of Nandan Garh, a lion pillar of Ashoka, made out of a single block of polished sandstone, measuring 35 feet (11 m) in height with a diameter of 35" at the base and 22" at the top, which is believed to be over 2,300 years old, is in an excellent condition. Its massiveness and exquisite finish furnish striking proof of the skill and resources of the masons of Ashokan age. Two more such pillars with their capitals removed have been discovered in Rampurwa village, close to Gandhi's Bhitiharawa Ashram in Gaunaha block. One of their capitals, the bull is now in the National Museum at New Delhi and the other, the lion, is at Calcutta Museum.

At Nandan Garh there are also Baudh (Buddha) stupas made out of bricks and about 80 feet (24 m) high which according to the authoritative source are Ashoka Stupas, in which ashes of Lord Buddha's funeral pyre are enshrined.

Someshwar Fort is situated in Narkatiaganj sub-division, near Nepal border, on top of Someshwar Hill at 2,884 ft (879 m) elevation. It is in a ruined state but its remains are well defined.

The Bhitiharawa Ashram of Mahatma Gandhi near Gaunaha in the eastern end of the Valmiki reserve. It is a village in Gaunaha block in Bihar from where Gandhiji started his freedom movement that came to be known as 'Champaran Satyagraha' in India history. The village houses the hut which is called Ashram and has become a place of Gandhian pilgrimage.

=== Mustang Caves ===
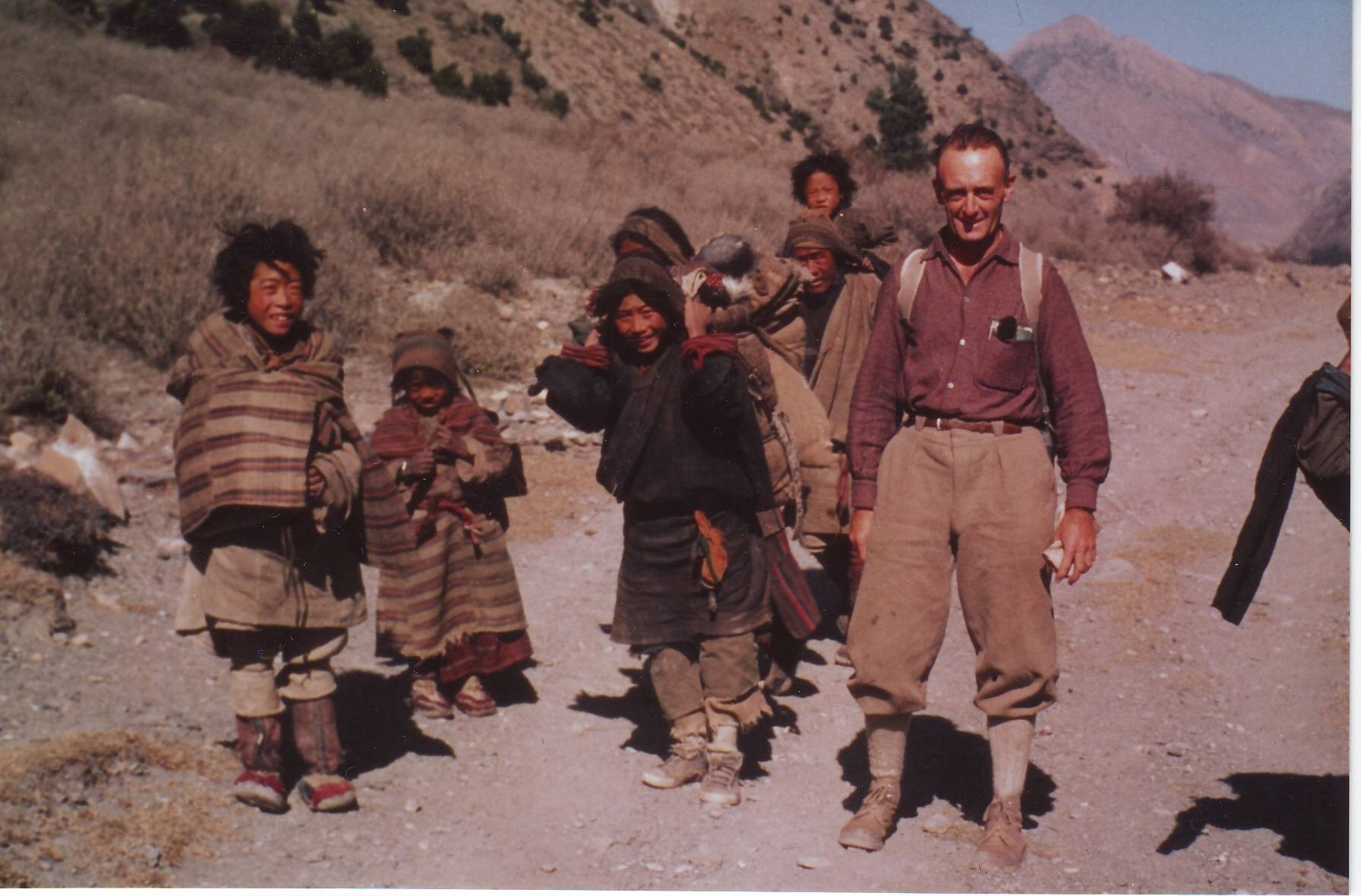
Gandaki Valley near Jomsom Nepal in October 1966

Mustang caves are a collection of some 10,000 human-made caves dug into the sides of valleys in the Mustang District of Nepal. The caves lie on the steep valley walls near the Kali Gandaki River in Upper Mustang. Several groups of archaeologists and researchers have explored these stacked caves and found partially mummified human bodies and skeletons that are at least 2,000-3,000 years old. Explorations of these caves by conservators and archaeologists have also led to the discovery of valuable religious paintings, sculptures, manuscripts and numerous artifacts belonging to the 12th to 14th century.

== Development scenario ==
=== Hydropower development ===
==== Nepal ====
In Nepal, Sapta Gandaki alone has a huge hydropower potential of 20,650 MW (economic exploitable potential is 5,270 MW) out of a total estimated potential of 83,290 MW (economically exploitable potential is 42,140 MW). The country has so far been able to generate only around 600 MW of hydropower out of which the Gandak basin projects contribute more than 266 MW, about 44%. The hydropower projects built are the Trisuli at Nuwakot (21 MW), Devighat at Nuwakot (14 MW), Pokhra (1 MW) and Western Gandak HEP, at Nawalparasi (15 MW), Marsyangdi at Tanahu (69 MW), Kali Gandaki at Syanja (144 MW), and Syange (2 MW). Middle Marsyangdi HE Project (70 MW) at Lamjung is under final stage of construction. Several major projects are on the anvil for implementation in the near future. With Government of Nepal now according priority to private-sector participation in a multi-pronged approach, the pace of hydropower development will get accelerated.

A major Indian firm has entered into a share purchase and joint venture agreement with a Nepalese firm to acquire 80 per cent stake of Nepalese Company for development of the Upper Marsyangdi HEP (250MW). Achieving the economically exploitable potential need would no more be a mirage.

Reportedly there are several other major projects being pursued by the Government of Nepal for private sector participation on IPP basis.

=== Irrigation ===
The Gandak Project at Valmikinagar (Bhainsaloton) intercepts water of a catchment area of 37,410 km (23,250 mi), which is mostly in Nepal and partly in India. An agreement was signed on 4 December 1959 between the governments of Nepal and of India on the Gandak Irrigation and Power Project. It encompassed the construction of a barrage, canal head regulators and other appurtenant works about 33 m (108 ft) below the existing Triveni Canal Head Regulator. The agreement was modified in 1964 for the protection of Nepal's riparian rights. Basically there is an agreed share of water for ‘western canal system including a power station in Nepal and eastern canal system. As a part of this bilateral agreement, the Gandak Barrage, a part of Gandak Project, was built in 1968–69 over the Gandak river for providing irrigation to Nepal, Uttar Pradesh and Bihar. The irrigation potential of this project is 11,510 km^{2} (4,440 sq mi), spread in the district of West Champaran, East Champaran, Muzaffarpur, Samastipur, Saran, Siwan and Gopalganj. The Eastern Gandak Canal Project was taken up in 1960 and Main Canal system was completed in 1975 for flow irrigation in Nepal for the gross commanded area estimated to be 103,500 acres (419 km^{2}).

A Gandak Hydropower Station with an installed capacity of 15 MW has also been constructed and commissioned on the bypass to Eastern Gandak Canal.

=== Flood management ===
Flood management does not aim at total elimination or control of floods or providing total immunity from the effects of all magnitudes of floods, which is neither practicable from economic considerations nor even necessary, keeping in view other realities that are faced in the Indian context. Thus, a multi-pronged strategy ranging from modifying the floods by means of structural measures to learning to live with the floods by means of other non-structural measures is the goal of flood management. Measures for protection against extreme floods of low frequency are seldom economically feasible. The term "flood management" refers to the provision of a reasonable degree of protection against floods by measures to mitigate the recurring havoc caused by floods. This is what is being done in flood plains of Gandak River in Bihar and Uttar Pradesh which are affected by floods.

== Navigation on the river ==
Nepal has carried out studies on the feasibility of having navigational use of the Gandaki river. Studies indicate that (a) it is feasible only in the lower reaches, (b) link it with India's number 1 highway from Allahabad to Haldia, and (c) cognizance has to be taken of the adverse situation which could arise due to increased irrigation use in dry seasons which could restrict the river level for maintaining possible navigation.

== In traditional and popular culture ==
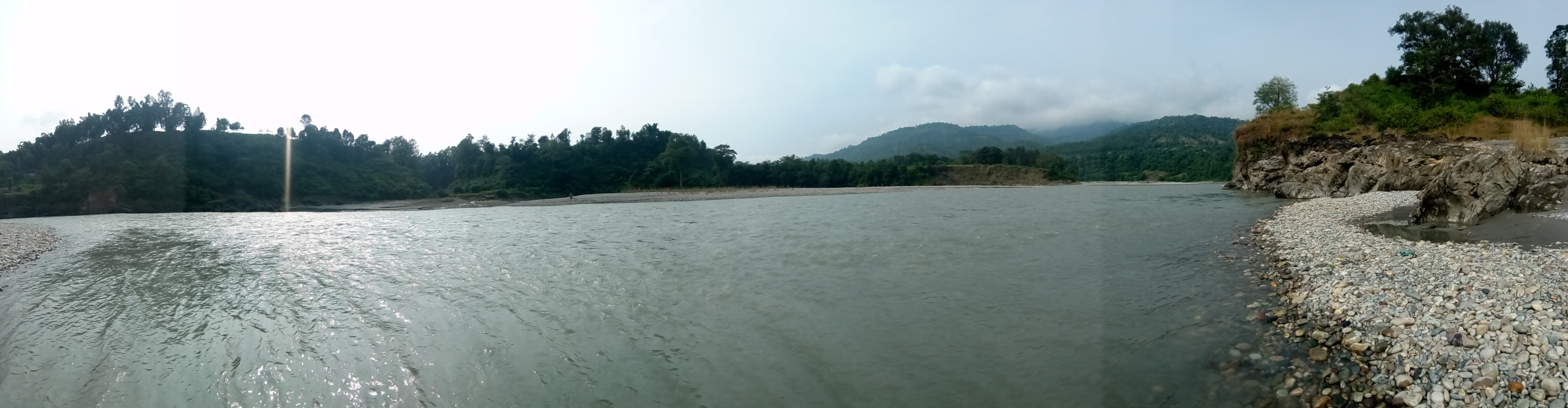
The Gandaki river divides Syangja District and Palpa District in Ramghat

The Gandaki river is mentioned in the ancient Sanskrit epic Mahabharata. Its evolution is described in Shiva Purana, Kumarakhand, in the chapter of the killing of Shankhachuda. A part of episode 1 of the documentary series "The Living Planet" was filmed in the Kali Gandaki Gorge.

== See also ==
- Kali Gandaki Gorge
