= Phalewas Municipality =

Phalewas Municipality फलेवास नगरपालिका
- Municipality
- Location of the municipality in Province Phalewas Municipality (Nepal)
- Coordinates: 28.17°N 83.67°E
- Country: Nepal
- Province: Gandaki Province
- District: Parbat District
- No. of wards: 11
- Established: 10 March 2017
- Incorporated (VDC): Karkineta, Thapathana, Shankar Pokhari, Mudikuwa, Phalebas Khanigaun, Devisthan, Limithana, Thana Maulo, Bhangara, Kurgha and Pangrang
- Admin HQ.: Phalebas Khanigaun

Government
  - Type: Mayor–council
  - Body: Phalewas Municipality Municipality
  - Mayor: Mr. Gangadhar Tiwari
  - Deputy Mayor: Mrs. Shova Kumari Chhetri

Area
  - Total: 85.70 km^{2} (33.09 sq mi)

Population (2011)
  - Total: 24,687
- Time zone: UTC+05:45 (NPT)
- Website: phalewasmun.gov.np

Phalewas (Nepali: फलेवास) is a municipality located in Parbat District of Gandaki Province of Nepal. The municipality was established on 10 March 2017 merging the former VDCs: Karkineta, Thapathana, Shankar Pokhari, Mudikuwa, Phalebas Khanigaun, Devisthan, Limithana, Thana Maulo, Bhangara, Kurgha and Pangrang The municipality is divided into 11 wards and the headquarter (admin centre) of the municipality declared at Phalebas Khanigaun. The municipality spans 85.70 square kilometres (33.09 sq mi) of area, with a total population of 24,688 individuals according to a 2011 Nepal census.

== Demographics ==
At the time of the 2011 Nepal census, Phalewas Municipality had a population of 24,729. Of these, 96.0% spoke Nepali, 1.3% Newar, 1.2% Gurung, 1.2% Magar, 0.1% Urdu and 0.2% other languages as their first language.

In terms of ethnicity/caste, 42.7% were Hill Brahmin, 26.8% Chhetri, 8.8% Kami, 7.1% Sarki, 5.0% Damai/Dholi, 4.1% Newar, 1.9% Magar, 1.4% Gurung, 0.5% Gharti/Bhujel and 1.7% others.

In terms of religion, 96.8% were Hindu, 2.6% Buddhist, 0.3% Muslim, 0.1% Christian and 0.2% others.
