= Modi Rural Municipality =

Modi (RM) मोदी गाउँपालिका
- Rural Municipality
- Location Modi (RM) (Nepal)
- Coordinates: 28.29°N 83.75°E
- Country: Nepal
- Province: Gandaki
- District: Parbat
- Wards: 8
- Established: 10 March 2017

Government
  - Type: Rural Council
  - Chairperson: Mr. Prem Sharma Paudel
  - Vice-chairperson: Mrs. Seti Mahat
  - Term of office: (2017 - 2022)

Area
  - Total: 143.6 km^{2} (55.4 sq mi)

Population (2011)
  - Total: 21,284
  - Density: 148.2/km^{2} (383.9/sq mi)
- Time zone: UTC+5:45 (Nepal Standard Time)
- Headquarter: Deupurkot
- Website: modimun.gov.np

Modi is a Rural municipality located within the Parbat District of the Gandaki Province of Nepal. The rural municipality spans 143.6 square kilometres (55.4 sq mi) of area, with a total population of 21,284 according to a 2011 Nepal census.

On March 10, 2017, the Government of Nepal restructured the local level bodies into 753 new local level structures. The previous Deupurkot, Bhuktangle, Deurali, Kyang, Bajung, Tilahar, Ramja Deurali and Chitre VDCs were merged to form Modi Rural Municipality. Modi is divided into 8 wards, with Deupurkot declared the administrative center of the rural municipality.The highest point of Modi Rural Municipality, and also of Parbat district is Kokhe Danda.

== Demographics ==
At the time of the 2011 Nepal census, Modi Rural Municipality had a population of 21,312. Of these, 87.5% spoke Nepali, 8.3% Magar, 3.4% Gurung, 0.1% Kham, 0.1% Rai, 0.1% Tamang, 0.1% Newar and 0.4% other languages as their first language.

In terms of ethnicity/caste, 24.3% were Hill Brahmin, 23.5% Chhetri, 14.2% Magar, 13.0% Kami, 6.3% Sarki, 6.2% Damai/Dholi, 5.4% Thakuri, 4.4% Gurung, 0.9% Sanyasi/Dasnami and 1.8% others.

In terms of religion, 83.0% were Hindu, 16.1% Buddhist, 0.6% Christian, 0.1% Muslim, 0.1% Kirati and 0.1% others.
