= Jaljala Rural Municipality =

Rural Municipality in Gandaki Province, Nepal

Jaljala Rural Municipality जलजला गाउँपालिका
- Rural Municipality
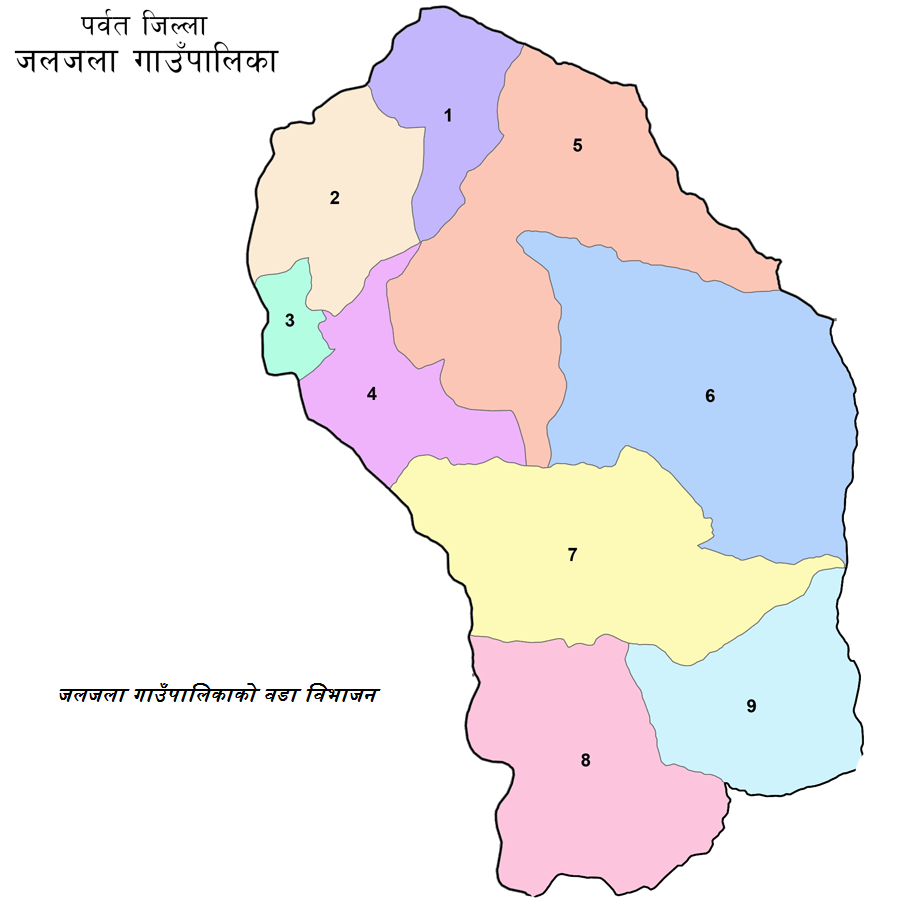
- जलजला गाउँपालिकाको वडा विभाजन

- नेपालको नक्शामा जलजला गाउँपालिका Jaljala Rural Municipality (Nepal)
- Coordinates (Mallaj): 28.34°N 83.58°E
- Country: Nepal
- Province: Gandaki Province
- District: Parbat District
- Established: २७ Phalguna २०७३

Government
  - Type: Local government
  - Body: Village Executive
  - Chairperson: Raju Prasad Acharya (Nepali Congress)
  - Vice-chairperson: Dipak Acharya (mawobadi)
  - Chief Administrative officer: Phanindra Prasad Acharya

Area
  - Total: 82.26 km^{2} (31.76 sq mi)

Population (2011 census)
  - Total: 21,454
  - Density: 260.8/km^{2} (675.5/sq mi)
- Time zone: UTC+05:45 (Nepal Standard Time)
- Area code: +९७७-६७
- Center: साविकको माझफाँट गाविसको कार्यालय

Jaljala (Nepali: जलजला गाउँपालिका) is a rural municipality in Parbat District of Gandaki Province, of Nepal. It was mapped by merging the pre-existing rural development committees of Parbat District including Baskharka, Mallaj Majhphant, Lekhphant, Dhairing, Nagliwang, Banau and Salija.

The total population of this rural municipality is 21,454. Its area is 82.26 km square. The main office is located at the pre-existing head office of Mallaj Majhphant. The rural municipality is divided into 9 wards. The neighboring local authorities includes Modi rural municipality in the east, Myagdi and Parbat districts in the west, Myagdi District in the north and Kusma municipality and Baglung District in the south.

== Demographics ==
At the time of the 2011 Nepal census, Jaljala Rural Municipality had a population of 21,527. Of these, 94.3% spoke Nepali, 4.0% Magar, 0.3% Bhojpuri, 0.3% Gurung, 0.3% Newar, 0.2%Hindi, 0.2% Tamang and 0.4% other languages as their first language.

In terms of ethnicity/caste, 23.9% were Magar, 22.8% Hill Brahmin, 20.5% Chhetri, 16.8% Damai/Dholi, 5.5% Kami, 2.5% Sarki, 2.3% Thakuri, 1.4% Newar, 0.9% Sanyasi/Dasnami and 3.4% others.

In terms of religion, 81.6% were Hindu, 15.9% Buddhist, 1.4% Christian, 0.8% Muslim and 0.3% others.
