= Bihadi Rural Municipality =

Bihadi Rural Municipality विहादी गाउँपालिका
- Rural Municipality
- Bihadi Rural Municipality, Office of the Rural Municipal Executive
- Location Bihadi Rural Municipality (Nepal)
- Coordinates: 28°02′44″N 83°35′32″E
- Country: Nepal
- Province: Gandaki
- District: Parbat
- Wards: 6
- Established: 10 March 2017

Government
  - Type: Rural Council
  - Chairperson: Mr. Parbin Gurung
  - Vice-chairperson: Mrs. Mina Sharma Tiwari
  - Term of office: (2022 - 2027)

Area
  - Total: 44.80 km^{2} (17.30 sq mi)

Population (2021)
  - Total: 10,828
  - Density: 241.7/km^{2} (626.0/sq mi)
- Time zone: UTC+5:45 (Nepal Standard Time)
- Headquarter: Bahaki Thanti
- Website: bihadimun.gov.np

Bihadi is a Rural municipality located within the Parbat District of the Gandaki Province of Nepal. The rural municipality spans 44.80 square kilometres (17.30 sq mi) of area, with a total population of 10828 according to a 2021 Nepal census.

On March 10, 2017, the Government of Nepal restructured the local level bodies into 753 new local level structures. The previous Bahaki Thanti, Bachchha, Barachaur, Ranipani, Urampokhara and Saligram VDCs were merged to form Bihadi Rural Municipality. Bihadi is divided into 6 wards, with Bahaki Thanti declared the administrative center of the rural municipality.

== Demographics ==
At the time of the 2011 Nepal census, Bihadi Rural Municipality had a population of 13,409. Of these, 90.0% spoke Nepali, 6.3% Magar, 3.3% Gurung, 0.3% Newar and 0.1% other languages as their first language.

Bihadi Rural Municipality is located in the southern part of Parbat District in Gandaki Province. This rural municipality was established by the decision of the Government of Nepal dated 2073/11/27. This rural municipality is bordered by Mahashila Rural Municipality and Paiyu Rural Municipality in the east, Gulmi District and Baglung District in the west, Baglung District and Phalebas Municipality in the north, and Syangja District and Gulmi District in the south. The total area of this rural municipality is 44.8 sq km. According to the National Census 2078, this rural municipality has a total population of 10,828 including 5,715 females and 5,113 males and a total number of 2,723 families. According to the National Census 2078, the total literacy rate of this rural municipality is 79.7 percent. This rural municipality is made up of 6 former villages. V. S. Bachha, Barrachaur, Ranipani, Bahakithanti, Urampokhara, Shaligram. The center of this rural municipality is located in Bahakithanti, Ward No. 4 of Bihadi Rural Municipality.

Important tourist attractions in this rural municipality include Shaligram Rock, Bacheshwor Temple, Shivpuri Dham, Chapakot Temple, Luringkot Temple, Sheetal Cave, Ranipani Cave, Bhanjyang Devi Temple, etc.

In terms of ethnicity/caste, 42.3% were Hill Brahmin, 10.4% Chhetri, 10.4% Magar, 9.7% Sarki, 6.7% Kami, 5.7% Damai/Dholi, 3.6% Gurung, 3.3% Sanyasi/Dasnami 2.7% Newar and 5.2% others.

In terms of religion, 90.8% were Hindu, 8.8% Buddhist, 0.2% Muslim, 0.1% Christian and 0.1% others.
