= Paiyun Rural Municipality =

Paiyun (RM) पैयुँ गाउँपालिका
- Rural Municipality
- Location Paiyun (RM) (Nepal)
- Coordinates: 28°02′34″N 83°39′59″E
- Country: Nepal
- Province: Gandaki
- District: Parbat
- Wards: 7
- Established: 10 March 2017

Government
  - Type: Rural Council
  - Chairperson: Mr. Raj Malla thakuri
  - Vice-chairperson: Mrs. Yam Kumari Rana
  - Term of office: (2017 - 2022)

Area
  - Total: 42.65 km^{2} (16.47 sq mi)

Population (2011)
  - Total: 15,381
  - Density: 360.6/km^{2} (934.0/sq mi)
- Time zone: UTC+5:45 (Nepal Standard Time)
- Headquarter: Huwas
- Website: paiyunmun.gov.np

Paiyun is a Rural municipality located within the Parbat District of the Gandaki Province of Nepal. The rural municipality spans 42.65 square kilometres (16.47 sq mi) of area, with a total population of 15,381 according to a 2011 Nepal census.

On March 10, 2017, the Government of Nepal restructured the local level bodies into 753 new local level structures. The previous Huwas, Taklak, Tribeni, Behulibans, Saraukhola and Bhorle VDCs were merged to form Paiyun Rural Municipality. Paiyun is divided into 7 wards, with Huwas declared the administrative center of the rural municipality.

== Demographics ==
At the time of the 2011 Nepal census, Paiyun Rural Municipality had a population of 15,381. Of these, 88.3% spoke Nepali, 9.1% Magar, 2.3% Gurung, 0.2% Newar and 0.1% other languages as their first language.

In terms of ethnicity/caste, 45.8% were Hill Brahmin, 22.1% Magar, 9.7% Kami, 4.5% Damai/Dholi, 4.4% Chhetri, 3.9% Gurung, 3.9% Thakuri, 2.8% Sarki, 1.6% Newar and 1.3% others.

In terms of religion, 91.2% were Hindu, 8.3% Buddhist, 0.3% Muslim, 0.1% Christian and 0.1% others.
