= Bajung =

Bajung बाजुङ
- Village development committee
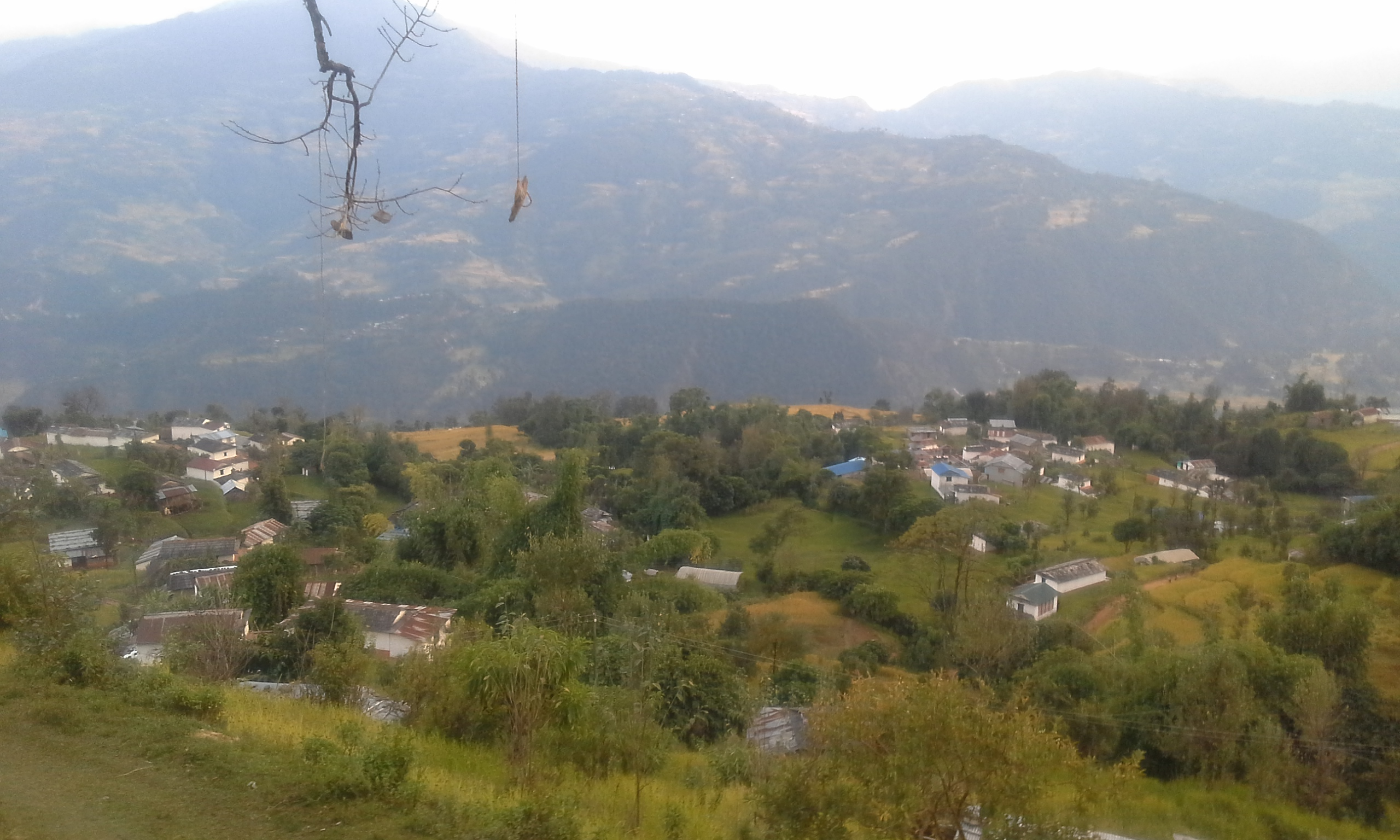
- A view of Bajung from Bajung Kot

- Location in Nepal Bajung (Nepal)
- Coordinates: 28.28°N 83.71°E
- Country: Nepal
- Zone: Dhawalagiri Zone
- District: Parbat District

Population (2011)
  - Total: 4,228 (Male−1,806 & Female−2,422)
- Time zone: UTC+5:45 (Nepal Time)
- Postal code: 33400
- Area code: 067

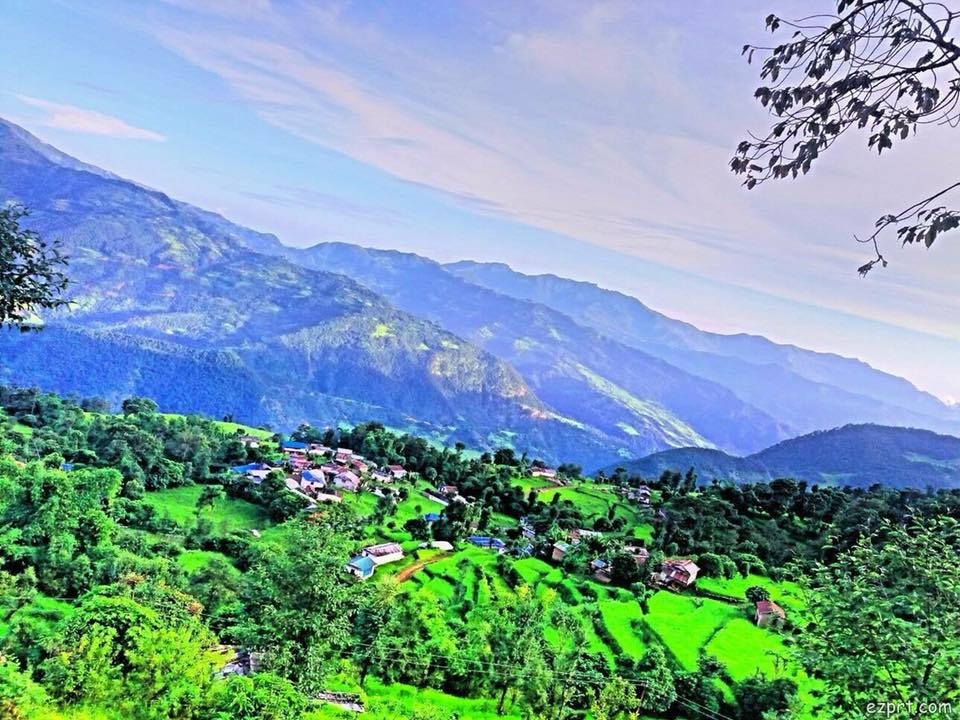
A View of Bajung

Bajung is a village development committee in Parbat District in the Dhawalagiri Zone of Western Development Region, Nepal. It is surrounded by Deupurkot to the north-east, Tilahar to the south-east, Durlung to the south-west and Kyang to the north-west. It is popularly said to be extended from the top of Maidan, a hill-top with historical identity to the basin of Modi River. At the time of the 2011 Nepal census it had a population of 4228 people living in 1,076 individual households.

Like all VDCs of Nepal, it comprises nine wards:

- Ward 1: Patichaur (पातीचौर),
- Ward 2: Bause (बाऊसे),
- Ward 3: Sanopakha (सानोपाखा),
- Ward 4: Shivalaya (शिवालय),
- Ward 5: Bhaththar (भत्थर),
- Ward 6: Bardeghar (बर्देघर),
- Ward 7: Falhalne (फलहाल्ने),
- Ward 8: Laampaat (लाम्पट),
- Ward 9: Kalimati (कालीमाटी)
