= Tanglekot =

Tanglekot ताङ्लेकोट
- Village development committee
- Country: Nepal
- Zone: Dhawalagiri Zone
- District: Parbat District

Population (1991)
  - Total: 1,281
- Time zone: UTC+5:45 (Nepal Time)

Tanglekot is a village development committee in Parbat District in the Dhawalagiri Zone of central Nepal. At the time of the 1991 Nepal census it had a population of 1281 people living in 277 individual households.
