= Chuwa =

Place in District of Parbat, Nepal

Kushma Municipality- 12, Chuwa, Parbat कुश्मा नगरपालिका १२, चुवा, पर्वत
- Location in Nepal Kushma Municipality- 12, Chuwa, Parbat (Nepal)
- Coordinates: 28.24°N 83.70°E
- Country: Nepal
- Zone: Dhawalagiri Zone
- District: Parbat District

Population (1991)
  - Total: 1,319
- Time zone: UTC+5:45 (Nepal Time)

Chuwa is a market center in Kushma Municipality in Parbat District in the Gandaki Province of central Nepal. The formerly Village Development committee was annexed to form the municipality since 18 May 2014. At the time of the 1991 Nepal census it had a population of 1319 people living in 299 individual households.
