= Pakhapani, Parbat =

Pakhapani पाखापानी
- Village Development Committee
- Location in Nepal Pakhapani (Nepal)
- Coordinates: 28.10°N 83.70°E
- Country: Nepal
- Zone: Dhawalagiri Zone
- District: Parbat District

Population (1991)
  - Total: 2,969
- Time zone: UTC+5:45 (Nepal Time)

Pakhapani is a Village Development Committee in Parbat District in the Dhawalagiri Zone of central Nepal. At the time of the 1991 Nepal census it had a population of 2969 people residing in 556 individual households. This village has three high schools located at; Pakhapani, Simley and Lamtun. It has nine wards and has a health post centre in each ward. The majority of the people have gone abroad for employment and remittance from them represents the economy. There are also numerous people who work in the British Army and Indian Army. Now this village has roads connecting all localities. Major village inside it are Kokhe(Chhetri community), Simle and Sarthan ( Thakuri villages) and Lamtun (Gurung village) and many smaller villages.
