= Phalebas Devisthan =

Phalebas Divisthan, Nepal Phalebas Divisthan
- Village development committee
- Location in Nepal Phalebas Divisthan, Nepal (Nepal)
- Coordinates: 28.16°N 83.65°E
- Country: Nepal
- Zone: Dhaulagiri Zone
- District: Parbat District

Population (1991)
  - Total: 3,308
- Time zone: UTC+5:45 (Nepal Time)

Phalebas city is a village development committee in Parbat District in the Dhaulagiri Zone of central Nepal. At the time of the 1991 Nepal census it had a population of 3308.
