= Dhawalagiri =

Dhawalagiri may refer to:

- Mount Dhawalagiri
- Dhawalagiri Zone
