= Bitalawa Pipaltari =

Pipaltari पीपलटारी
- Village development committee
- Location in Nepal Pipaltari (Nepal)
- Coordinates: 28.21°N 83.71°E
- Country: Nepal
- Zone: Dhawalagiri Zone
- District: Parbat District

Government

Population (1991)
  - Total: 2,428
- Time zone: UTC+5:45 (Nepal Time)

Pipaltari is a village development committee in Parbat District in the Dhawalagiri Zone of central Nepal. At the time of the 1991 Nepal census it had a population of 2428 people living in 494 individual households.
