= Thapathana =

Thapathana थापाठाना
- Village development committee
- Location in Nepal Thapathana (Nepal)
- Coordinates: 28.17°N 83.73°E
- Country: Nepal
- Zone: Dhawalagiri Zone
- District: Parbat District

Population (1991)
  - Total: 3,263
- Time zone: UTC+5:45 (Nepal Time)

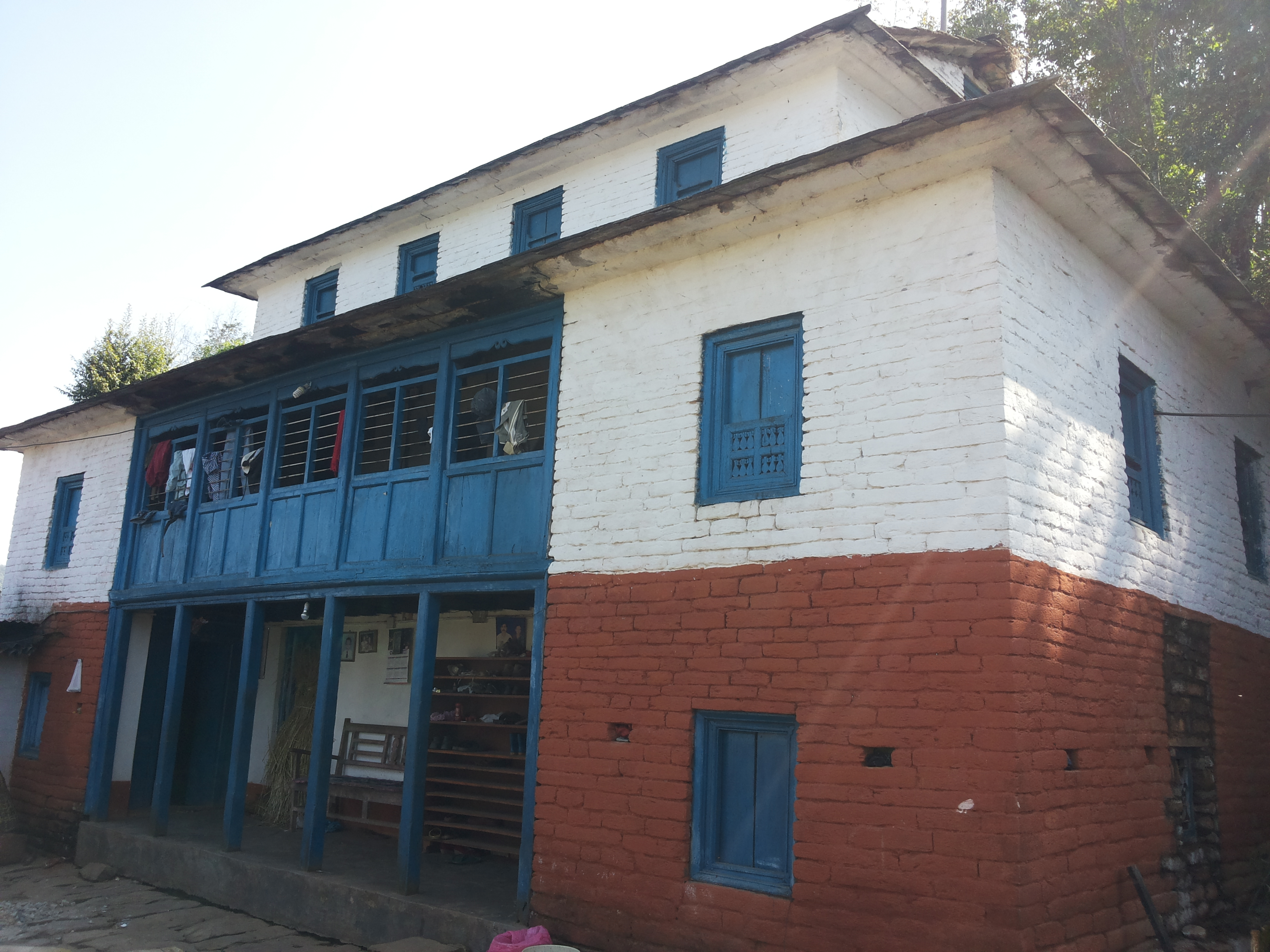
Typical houses in Thapathana, Parbat

Thapathana (28°10′N 83°44′E) (Nepali: थापाठाना) is one of the Ward of Phalewas Municipality of Gandaki Province established by the current constitution of Nepal which was promulgated on 20 September 2015. It was renamed as ward no. 2 of Phalewas Municipality. At the time of the 1991 Nepal census, it had a population of 3263 people living in 639 individual households. This ward of Nepal is well known for some high elevated hills and natural sceneries. This place consists of locals speaking the Nepali language as their primary language and Hinduism is followed by the majority of the locals.

Attractions of Thapathana, Parbat

Dahare Deurali:

Perched atop a mountain at 2,266 meters, Dahare Deurali is a renowned Hindu religious site lying between the border of Parbat and Syangja district. A one-hour trek from the entrance base leads pilgrims and visitors to this sacred place. Believed to be a haven for divine saints, Dahare Deurali attracts a surge in visitors during the Dashain festival.

The panoramic views of Annapurna and Dhaulagiri mountains are enveloped by greenery.

Images:

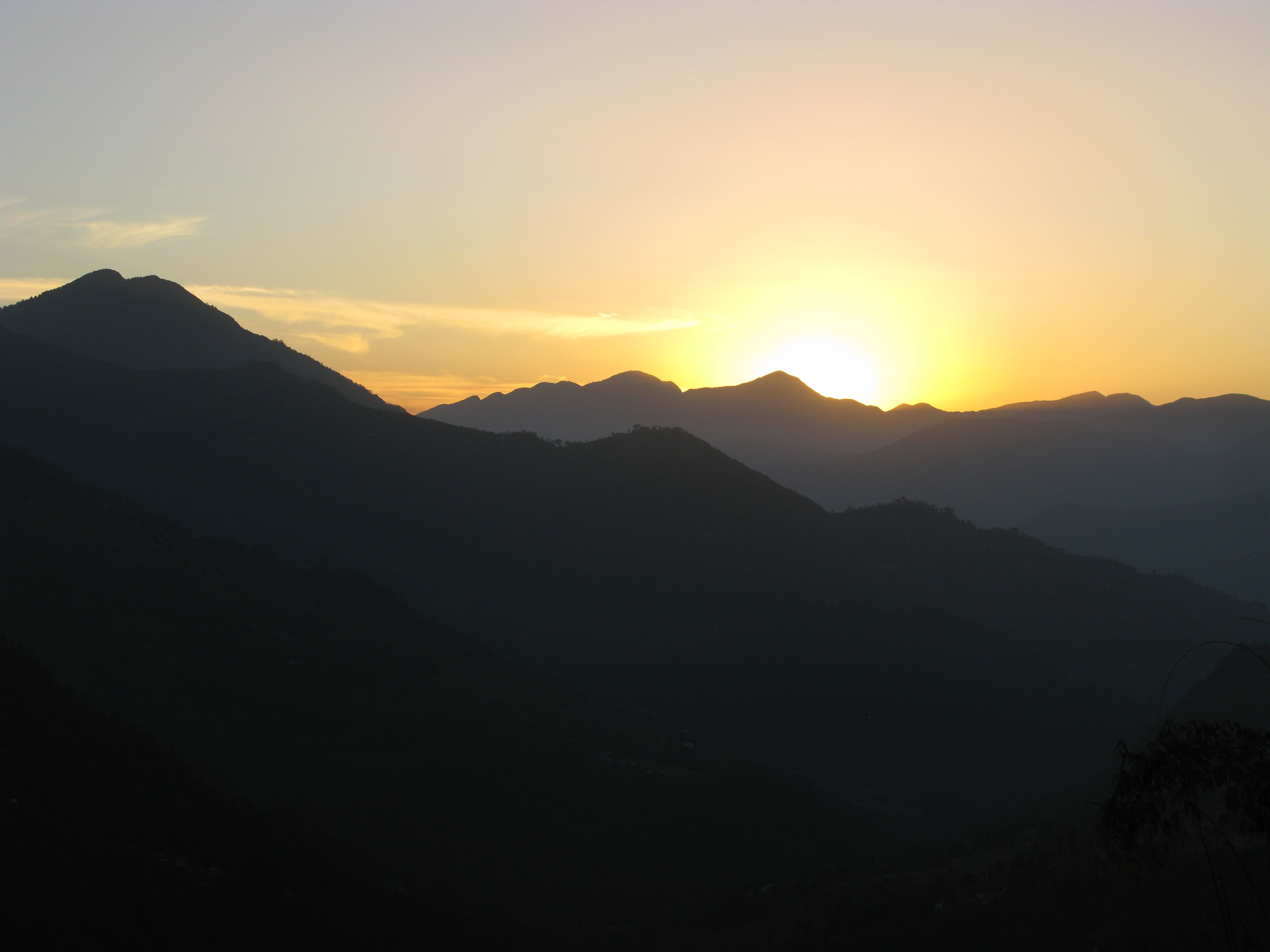
A sunset from thapathana
