= Durlung, Parbat =

Durlung, Dhawalagiri Durlung
- Location in Nepal Durlung, Dhawalagiri (Nepal)
- Coordinates: 28.26°N 83.70°E
- Country: Nepal
- Zone: Dhawalagiri Zone
- District: Parbat District

Population (1991)
  - Total: 3,202
- Time zone: UTC+5:45 (Nepal Time)

Durlung is a market center in Kushma Municipality in Parbat District in the Dhawalagiri Zone of central Nepal. The formerly Village Development committee was annexed to form the municipality since 18 May 2014. At the time of the 1991 Nepal census it had a population of 3202 people living in 659 individual households.
