= Bhangra =

Bhangra may refer to:

- Bhangra (music), a genre of Punjabi music
- Bhangra (dance), a folk dance of Punjab region
- Bhangra (film), a 1959 Indian Punjabi-language film

== See also ==
- Bhangara, Nepal, a village development committee
- Banghra, Spanish music band
