= Behulibans =

Behulibans बेहुलीबाँस
- Village development committee
- Location in Nepal Behulibans (Nepal)
- Coordinates: 28.05°N 83.65°E
- Country: Nepal
- Zone: Dhawalagiri Zone
- District: Parbat District

Population (1991)
  - Total: 2,940
- Time zone: UTC+5:45 (Nepal Time)

Behulibans is a village development committee in Parbat District in the Dhawalagiri Zone of central Nepal. At the time of the 1991 Nepal census it had a population of 2940.
