= Khaula Lakuri =

Khaula Lakuri खाउला लाँकुरी
- Village development committee
- Location in Nepal Khaula Lakuri (Nepal)
- Coordinates: 28.19°N 83.73°E
- Country: Nepal
- Zone: Dhawalagiri Zone
- District: Parbat District

Population (1991)
  - Total: 2,461
- Time zone: UTC+5:45 (Nepal Time)

KKhaula Lakuri is a village development committee in Parbat District in the Dhawalagiri Zone of central Nepal. At the time of the 1991 Nepal census it had a population of 2461 people living in 465 individual households.
