= Balakot, Nepal =

Balakot, Nepal बलाकोट
- Village development committee
- Location in Nepal Balakot, Nepal (Nepal)
- Coordinates: 28.09°N 83.68°E
- Country: Nepal
- Zone: Dhawalagiri Zone
- District: Parbat District

Population (1991)
  - Total: 1,566
- Time zone: UTC+5:45 (Nepal Time)

Balakot, Nepal is a village development committee in Parbat District in the Dhawalagiri Zone of central Nepal. At the time of the 1991 Nepal census it had a population of 1566 people living in 293 individual households.
