= Pakuwa =

- Location in Nepal Pakuwa (Nepal)
- Coordinates: 28.23°N 83.73°E
- Country: Nepal
- Zone: Dhawalagiri Zone
- District: Parbat District

Population (1991)
  - Total: 2,343
- Time zone: UTC+5:45 (Nepal Time)

Pakuwa is a market center in Kushma Municipality in Parbat District in the Dhawalagiri Zone of central Nepal. The formerly Village Development committee was annexed to form the municipality since 18 May 2014. At the time of the 1991 Nepal census it had a population of 2343 people living in 481 individual households.
