= Khurkot, Parbat =

Khurkot
- Location in Nepal Khurkot (Nepal)
- Coordinates: 28.26°N 83.66°E
- Country: Nepal
- Zone: Dhawalagiri Zone
- District: Parbat District

Population (1991)
  - Total: 3,809
- Time zone: UTC+5:45 (Nepal Time)

Khurkot is a market center in Kushma Municipality in Parbat District in the Dhawalagiri Zone of central Nepal. The formerly Village Development committee was annexed to form the municipality since 18 May 2014. At the time of the 1991 AD Nepal census it had a population of 3809 people living in 738 individual households. In the northern part of this village there is KOTA- Durga temple and just half of a mile distance leading south, There is a large stone bearing the clear signs of hoofs of cow where a temple is built on 2053 BS (1996) named Kamadhenu Mandir. Including these two symbols people called it as Khurkot. Later on, the entire region covering 20 ropani and 200 acres of it came to be known as Khurkot village. It borders with Banau and Kyang in the north, Durlung in the west, Shivalaya in the south and Pang at West.
