= Phalamkhani =

Phalamkhani फलामखानी
- Village development committee
- Location in Nepal Phalamkhani (Nepal)
- Coordinates: 28.12°N 83.70°E
- Country: Nepal
- Zone: Dhawalagiri Zone
- District: Parbat District

Population (1991)
  - Total: 978
- Time zone: UTC+5:45 (Nepal Time)

Phalamkhani is a village development committee in Parbat District in the Dhawalagiri Zone of central Nepal. At the time of the 1991 Nepal census it had a population of 978 people living in 178 individual households.
