= Bhuk Deurali =

Bhuk Deurali भुक देउराली
- Village development committee
- Country: Nepal
- Zone: Dhawalagiri Zone
- District: Parbat District
- Time zone: UTC+5:45 (Nepal Time)

Bhuk Deurali is a village development committee in Parbat District in the Dhawalagiri Zone of central Nepal.
