= Thuli Pokhari =

Thulipokhari
- Village development committee
- Location in Nepal Thulipokhari (Nepal)
- Coordinates: 28.20°N 83.72°E
- Country: Nepal
- Zone: Dhawalagiri Zone
- District: Parbat District

Population (1991)
  - Total: 2,753
- Time zone: UTC+5:45 (Nepal Time)

Thulipokhari is a village development committee in Parbat District in the Dhawalagiri Zone of central Nepal. At the time of the 1991 Nepal census it had a population of 2753 people living in 557 individual households. Thulipokhari is one of the academic center of Parbat District. Janata Sudarshan Secondary School and Janata Sudarshan multiple campus are the major education foundation of the region. Janata Sudarshan School situated at Thulipokhari served as a major educational institution for the people of Thulipokhari and surrounding villages for years. Alumni of this school are now around the globe working as Engineers, Doctors and are successful entrepreneurs.
