= Lunkhu Deurali =

Lunkhu Deurali लुङ्खु देउराली Mahashila 5
- Ward
- Location in Nepal Lunkhu Deurali (Nepal)
- Coordinates: 28.11°N 83.68°E
- Country: Nepal
- Province: Gandaki
- District: Parbat District
- Local Level: Mahashila Rural Municipality

Government
  - Ward President: Chandra Bahadur Malla
  - Female Member: Radha padhya
  - Dalit Female Member: Kamala Kushmeli Nepali
  - Member: Surya Bahadur Gurung
  - Member: Tilak Jaisi

Population (2021)
  - Total: 2,276
- Time zone: UTC+5:45 (Nepal Time)

Lunkhu Deurali was a Village Development Committee in Parbat District in the Gandaki Province Nepal. At the time of the 2021 Nepal census it had a population of 2276 people living in 503 individual households.

Lunkhu Deurali is one of the few VDCs in Parbat District that fully enjoys basic facilities such as electricity, drinkable water, road connection, education, communication and others. It has direct road connection with Pokhara and Kusma the later being the district headquarters. Vendors transport goods from Pokhara and Kathmandu. The majority in Lunkhu are Bramhin, followed by Dalit, Chhetri, Thakuri, Gurung and Others.

Notable Feature: The Mahashila Stone Lunkhu Deurali is known for being home to the “Mahashila”, a massive rock formation considered by locals to be among the world's largest single stone formations. This natural landmark is not only geologically significant but also holds cultural and spiritual value for the local community. It is believed to have inspired the name of the current Mahashila Rural Municipality. The stone attracts visitors for its sheer size and has the potential to become a major geo-tourism attraction if properly promoted.

Following are the Educational Institutes in Lunkhu

- Shree Mahendra Jyoti Secondary School,
- Shree Chanaute Prathameek Bidhyalaya
