= Devisthan, Parbat =

Devisthan देवीस्थान
- Village development committee
- Location in Nepal Devisthan (Nepal)
- Coordinates: 28.19°N 83.72°E
- Country: Nepal
- Zone: Dhawalagiri Zone
- District: Parbat District

Population (2008)
  - Total: 2,729
- Time zone: UTC+5:45 (Nepal Time)

Devisthan, Parbat is a village development committee in Parbat District in the Dhawalagiri Zone of central Nepal. At the time of the 1991 Nepal census it had a population of 2729 people living in 479 individual households.
