= Urampokhara =

Urampokhara उराम पोखरा
- Village development committee
- Location in Nepal Urampokhara (Nepal)
- Coordinates: 28.06°N 83.62°E
- Country: Nepal
- Zone: Dhawalagiri Zone
- District: Parbat District

Population (1991)
  - Total: 2,605
- Time zone: UTC+5:45 (Nepal Time)

Urampokhara is a village development committee in Parbat District in the Dhawalagiri Zone of central Nepal. At the time of the 1991 Nepal census, the village had a population of 2,605 people, living in a total of 483 individual households.
