= Salija =

Village development committee in Dhawalagiri Zone, Nepal

Salija सालिजा शैलाज
- Village development committee
- Location in Nepal Salija (Nepal)
- Coordinates: 28.34°N 83.64°E
- Country: Nepal
- Zone: Dhawalagiri Zone
- District: Parbat District

Population (1991)
  - Total: 2,690
- Time zone: UTC+5:45 (Nepal Time)
- Postal code: 33400

Salija is a village development committee in Parbat District in the Dhawalagiri Zone of central Nepal. At the time of the 1991 Nepal census it had a population of 2690 people living in 535 individual households.
