= Bhorle, Parbat =

Bhorle भोर्ले
- Village development committee
- Location in Nepal Bhorle (Nepal)
- Coordinates: 28.07°N 83.70°E
- Country: Nepal
- Zone: Dhawalagiri Zone
- District: Parbat District

Population (1991)
  - Total: 2,496
- Time zone: UTC+5:45 (Nepal Time)

Bhorle is a village development committee in Parbat District in the Dhaulagiri Zone of central Nepal. At the time of the 1991 Nepal census it had a population of 2496 people living in 458 individual households.
