= Bihadi Ranipani =

Bihadi Ranipani बिहादी रानीपानी
- Village development committee
- Location in Nepal Bihadi Ranipani (Nepal)
- Coordinates: 28.04°N 83.58°E
- Country: Nepal
- Zone: Dhawalagiri Zone
- District: Parbat District

Population (1991)
  - Total: 2,712
- Time zone: UTC+5:45 (Nepal Time)

Bihadi Ranipani is a village development committee in Parbat District in the Dhawalagiri Zone of central Nepal. At the time of the 1991 Nepal census it had a population of 2712 people living in 516 individual households.
