= Taklak =

Taklak टकलाक
- Village development committee
- Location in Nepal Taklak (Nepal)
- Coordinates: 28°01′55″N 083°37′49″E
- Country: Nepal
- Zone: Dhawalagiri Zone
- District: Parbat District

Population (1991)
  - Total: 1,515
- Time zone: UTC+5:45 (Nepal Time)

Taklak (Talak) is a village development committee in Parbat District in the Dhawalagiri Zone of central Nepal. At the time of the 1991 Nepal census it had a population of 1,515 people living in 270 individual households.
