= Bahaki Thanti =

wahaki thati वाहकी ठाँटी
- Village development committee
- Location in Nepal wahaki thati (Nepal)
- Coordinates: 28.02°N 83.35°E
- Country: Nepal
- Zone: Dhawalagiri Zone
- District: Parbat District

Population (1991)
  - Total: 4,397
- Time zone: UTC+5:45 (Nepal Time)

Bahaki Thanti is a village development committee in Parbat District in the Dhawalagiri Zone of central Nepal. At the time of the 1991 Nepal census it had a population of 4397 people living in 823 individual households.
