= Lekhphant =

Lekhfant लेखफाँट
- Village development committee
- Location in Nepal Lekhfant (Nepal)
- Coordinates: 28.37°N 83.62°E
- Country: Nepal
- Zone: Dhaulagiri Zone
- District: Parbat District

Population (1991)
  - Total: 3,017
- Time zone: UTC+5:45 (Nepal Time)

Lekhphant is a village development committee in Parbat District in the Dhaulagiri Zone of central Nepal. At the time of the 1991 Nepal census it had a population of 3017 people living in 581 individual households.
