= Kamadhenu Mandir =

- Kamadhenu Mandir in Nepal

Religion
- Affiliation: Hinduism
- District: Parbat
- Deity: Kamadhenu
- Festival: Krishna Janmashtami Lakshmi puja

Location
- Location: Khurkot, Khurkot The goddess Radhakrishna
- State: Gandaki Province
- Country: Nepal
- Coordinates: 28.26°N 83.66°E

Kamadhenu Mandir (Nepali: कामधेनु मन्दिर) is a Hindu temple temple in Khurkot village, Kushma municipality, Parbat, in the Dhawalagiri Zone of western Nepal.
