= Thana Maulo =

ThanaMaula ठानामौला
- Village development committee
- Nickname: फलेवास नगरपालिका 8
- Location in Nepal ThanaMaula (Nepal)
- Coordinates: 28.15°N 83.68°E
- Country: Nepal
- Zone: Dhawalagiri Zone
- District: Parbat District

Population (1991)
  - Total: 4,000
- Time zone: UTC+5:45 (Nepal Time)

ThanaMaula is a village development committee in Parbat District in the Dhawalagiri Zone of central Nepal. At the time of the 1991 Nepal census it had a population of 1700 people living in 331 individual households.
