= Bhuktangle =

- Village development committee
- Location in Nepal Bhuktangle (Nepal)
- Coordinates: 28.35°N 83.70°E
- Country: Nepal
- Zone: Dhawalagiri Zone
- District: Parbat District

Population (1991)
  - Total: 2,880
- Time zone: UTC+5:45 (Nepal Time)

Bhuktangle is a village development committee in Parbat District in the Dhawalagiri Zone of central Nepal. At the time of the 1991 Nepal census it had a population of 2880.
