= Baskharka =

Lapchung Baskharka
- Village development committee
- Location in Nepal Lapchung Baskharka (Nepal)
- Coordinates: 28.37°N 83.59°E
- Country: Nepal
- Zone: Dhawalagiri Zone
- District: Parbat District

Population (1991)
  - Total: 893
- Time zone: UTC+5:45 (Nepal Time)

Lapchung Baskharka is a village development committee in Parbat District in the Dhawalagiri Zone of central Nepal. At the time of the 1991 Nepal census it had a population of 893 people living in 195 individual households.
