= Shankar Pokhari =

Shankar Pokhari शंकर पोखरी
- Village development committee
- Location in Nepal Shankar Pokhari (Nepal)
- Coordinates: 28.18°N 83.69°E
- Country: Nepal
- Zone: Dhawalagiri Zone
- District: Parbat District

Population (1991)
  - Total: 2,547
- Time zone: UTC+5:45 (Nepal Time)

Shankar Pokhari is a village development committee in Parbat District in the Dhawalagiri Zone of central Nepal. At the time of the 1991 Nepal census it had a population of 2547 people living in 830 individual households.
