= Bihadi Barachaur =

Bihadi Barachaur बिहादी बर्राचौर
- Village development committee
- Location in Nepal Bihadi Barachaur (Nepal)
- Coordinates: 28.06°N 83.58°E
- Country: Nepal
- Zone: Dhawalagiri Zone
- District: Parbat District

Population (1991)
  - Total: 2,215
- Time zone: UTC+5:45 (Nepal Time)

Bihadi Barachaur is a village development committee in Parbat District in the Dhawalagiri Zone of central Nepal. At the time of the 1991 Nepal census it had a population of 2215 people living in 424 individual households.
