= Chitre =

Chitre चित्रे
- Village development committee
- Location in Nepal Chitre (Nepal)
- Coordinates: 28.25°N 83.79°E
- Country: Nepal
- Zone: Dhawalagiri Zone
- District: Parbat District

Population (1991)
  - Total: 2,229
- Time zone: UTC+5:45 (Nepal Time)

Chitre is a village development committee in Parbat District in the Dhawalagiri Zone of central Nepal. At the time of the 1991 Nepal census it had a population of 2229.
