= Nagliwang =

Nagliwang नाग्लिवाङ
- Village development committee
- Location in Nepal Nagliwang (Nepal)
- Coordinates: 28°17′11″N 83°37′08″E
- Country: Nepal
- Zone: Dhawalagiri Zone
- District: Parbat District

Population (1991)
  - Total: 2,473
- Time zone: UTC+5:45 (Nepal Time)

Nagliwang is a village development committee in Parbat District in the Dhawalagiri Zone of central Nepal. At the time of the 1991 Nepal census it had a population of 2473 people living in 493 individual households.
