= Mudikuwa =

Mudikuwa मुडीकुवा
- Village development committee
- Location in Nepal Mudikuwa (Nepal)
- Coordinates: 28.19°N 83.67°E
- Country: Nepal
- Zone: Dhawalagiri Zone
- District: Parbat District

Population (1991)
  - Total: 2,400
- Time zone: UTC+5:45 (Nepal Time)

Mudikuwa is a village development committee in Parbat District in the Dhawalagiri Zone of central Nepal. At the time of the 1991 Nepal census it had a population of 2400 people living in 443 individual households.
