= Saligram, Nepal =

Saligram, Nepal शालिग्राम
- Village development committee
- Location in Nepal Saligram, Nepal (Nepal)
- Coordinates: 28.03°N 83.60°E
- Country: Nepal
- Zone: Dhawalagiri Zone
- District: Parbat District

Population (1991)
  - Total: 3,021
- Time zone: UTC+5:45 (Nepal Time)

Saligram, Nepal is a village development committee in Parbat District in the Dhawalagiri Zone of central Nepal. At the time of the 1991 Nepal census, it had a population of 3,021.
