= Banau =

Village development committee in Dhawalagiri Zone, Nepal

Banau बनौं
- Village development committee
- Location in Nepal Banau (Nepal)
- Coordinates: 28.28°N 83.65°E
- Country: Nepal
- Zone: Dhawalagiri Zone
- District: Parbat District

Population (1991)
  - Total: 1,432
- Time zone: UTC+5:45 (Nepal Time)

Banau is a village development committee in Parbat District in the Dhawalagiri Zone of central Nepal. At the time of the 1991 Nepal census it had a population of 1432 people living in 251 individual households.

It is inhabited by Pun Magars. It is known for its export of potato products to the neighboring villages of Baglung and Myadgi, and throughout the Parbat District. There are also undiscovered caves and medicinal herbs in the area. It has a view of the Tricity of Baglung, Beni and Kushma.

== Development ==
The village has been developing in availability of communication and transportation. INGOs and NGOs have worked to develop the area and improve sanitation, and Internet service and electricity are available. There is also a developing school system.

The culture is somewhat distinct from surrounding villages. Young people have started computer teaching and are beginning to modernize the village. An influence of western culture is also apparent.
