= Ramja Deurali =

Ramja Deurali राम्जा देउराली
- Village development committee
- Location in Nepal Ramja Deurali (Nepal)
- Coordinates: 28.23°N 83.76°E
- Country: Nepal
- Zone: Dhawalagiri Zone
- District: Parbat District

Population (1991)
  - Total: 2,549
- Time zone: UTC+5:45 (Nepal Time)

Ramja Deurali is a village development committee in Parbat District in the Dhawalagiri Zone of central Nepal. At the time of the 1991 Nepal census it had a population of 2549 people living in 497 individual households.
