= Kurgha, Parbat =

Kurgha कुर्घा
- Village development committee
- Location in Nepal Kurgha (Nepal)
- Coordinates: 28.13°N 83.66°E
- Country: Nepal
- Zone: Dhaulagiri Zone
- District: Parbat District

Population (1991)
  - Total: 3,358
- Time zone: UTC+5:45 (Nepal Time)

Kurgha is a village development committee in Parbat District in the Dhaulagiri Zone of central Nepal. At the time of the 1991 Nepal census it had a population of 3358 people living in 633 individual households.

Kurgha became part of Phalewash Nagarpalika (Municipality)
