= Karkineta =

Karkineta, Nepal कार्कीनेटा, नेपाल
- Village development committee
- Location in Nepal Karkineta, Nepal (Nepal)
- Coordinates: 28.17°N 83.75°E
- Country: Nepal
- Zone: Dhawalagiri Zone
- District: Parbat District

Population (1991)
  - Total: 2,166
- Time zone: UTC+5:45 (Nepal Time)

Karkineta is a village development committee in Parbat District in the Dhawalagiri Zone of central Nepal. At the time of the 1991 Nepal census it had a population of 2166 people living in 432 individual households. Karkineta is at the height of 1609.3 meters from the sea level. The Village has one high school (Grade 1–12) and college (BS Education & BS Arts). Students from nearby villages attend the schools and college in Karkineta.

Two major highways go via Karkineta. Karkineta is ward # 1 at Phalebas district. From Karkineta you may see the panoramic view of Mount Annapurna Himalayan Range.

There are 6 major castes of people residing in the village. Brahamin, Chhetri, Newar, Damai, Kami, Sarki!

Karkineta was affected by an earthquake in 2015.. It damaged public high school in Karkineta, Nepal. Karkineta is a village in remote mountains in western Nepal. The Nepal Government does not have sustainable funds to rebuild their educational institutions. Poor Nepali communities and families experience educational, economic, and social disadvantages without these recovery efforts.

Education investments will help Karkineta improve as a society. Today, attending school children are first-generation students from upper and lower castes family, diverse social status, and classes are equal gender. I have seen first-hand how the positive impact educational programs such as adult education, community micro finance, and free education for lower caste children helps Karkineta. Good Education at the public school teaches the importance of personal hygiene, family planning, and overall higher quality of life.

Karkineta needs sustainable source of energy to improve the village economic. With energy several small businesses could be started. Local production of goods will keep local people busy and people no longer have to migrate to foreign for cheap labor or live an unhealthy life in polluted cities in Nepal.

== History ==
Karkineta is known the famous Bagh Dhunga & the world famous Karkineta Naumati panche Baja, https://www.youtube.com/watch?v=M0_DWd-xcrU

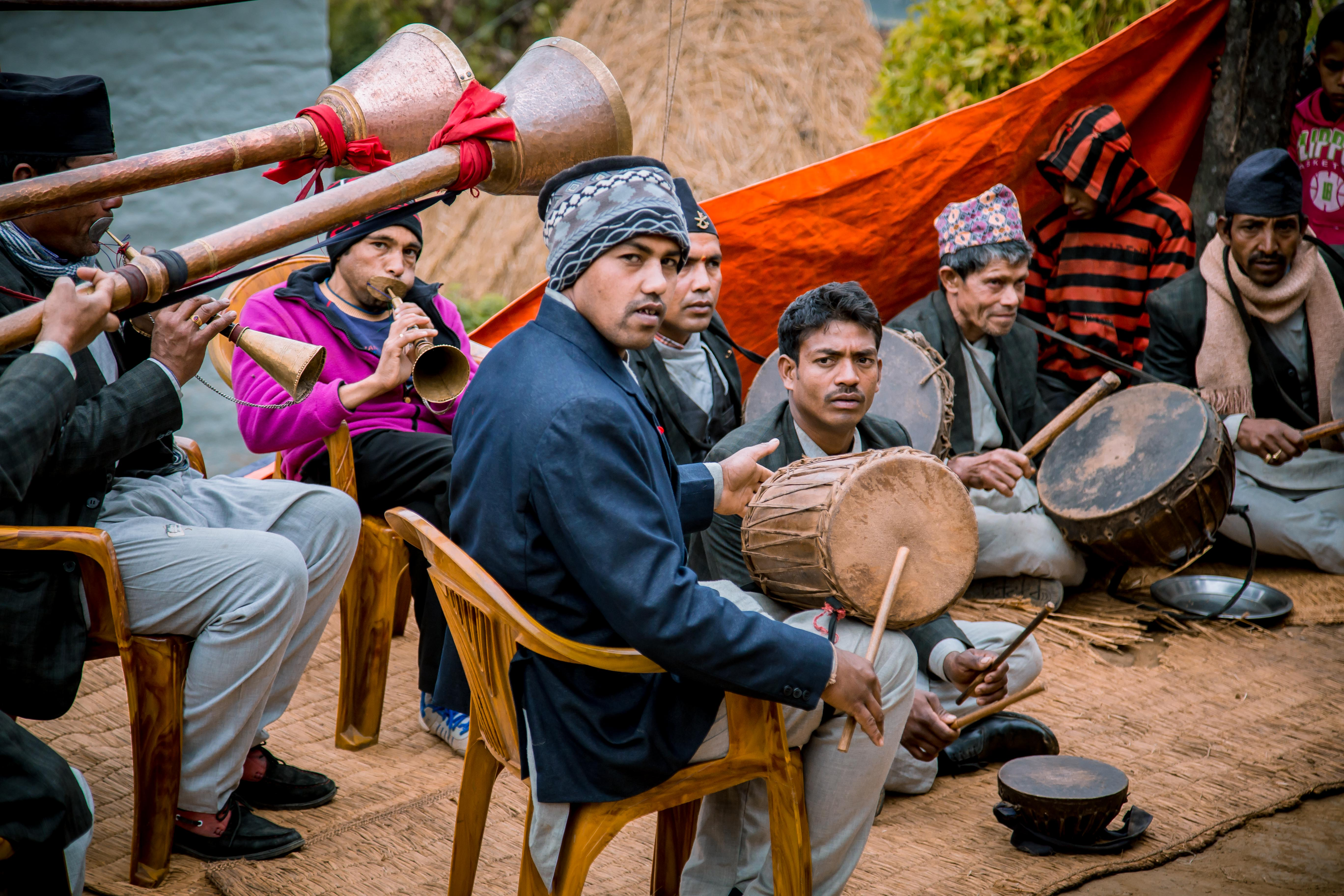
Authentic karkineta Baja

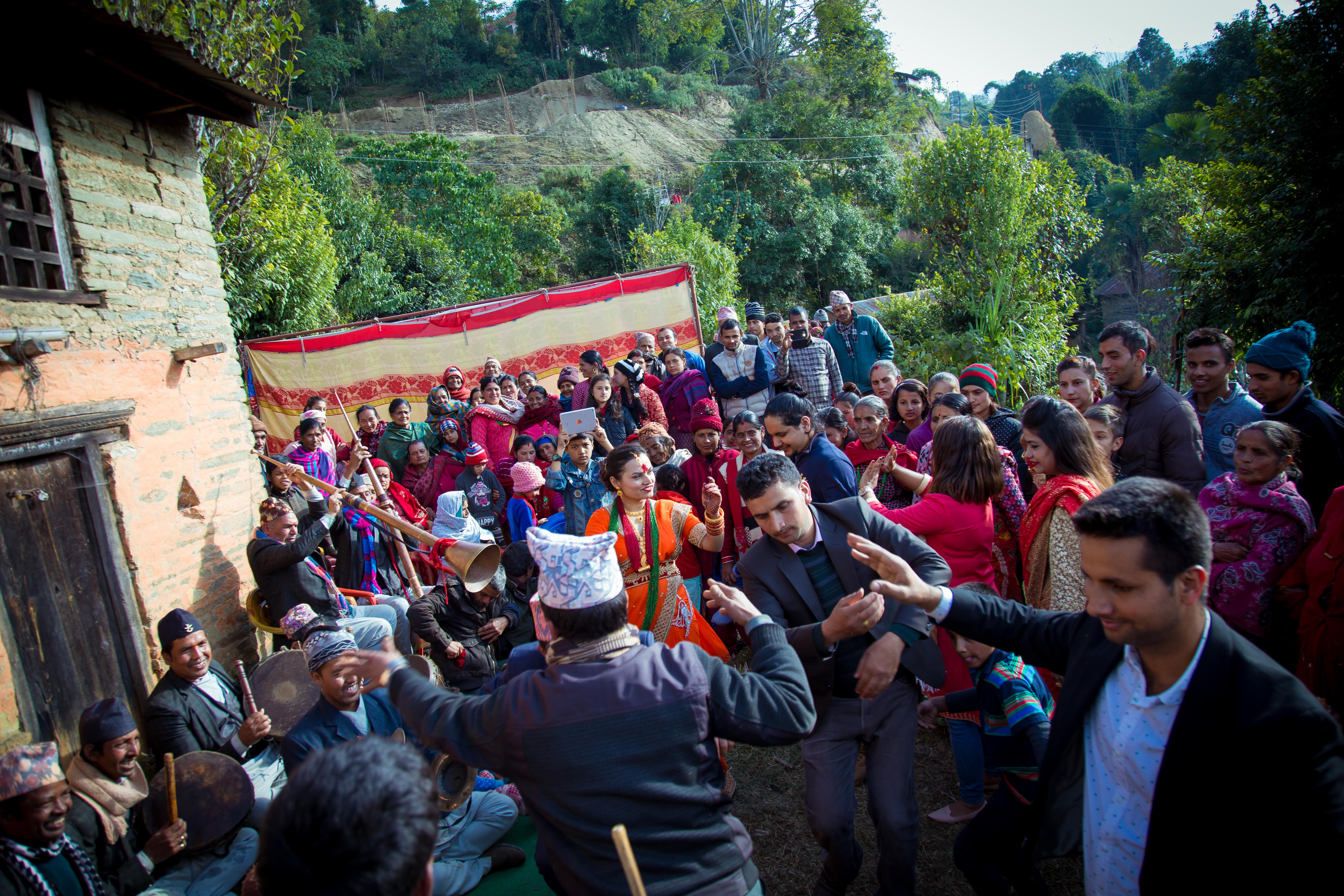
Villagers dancing on the baja

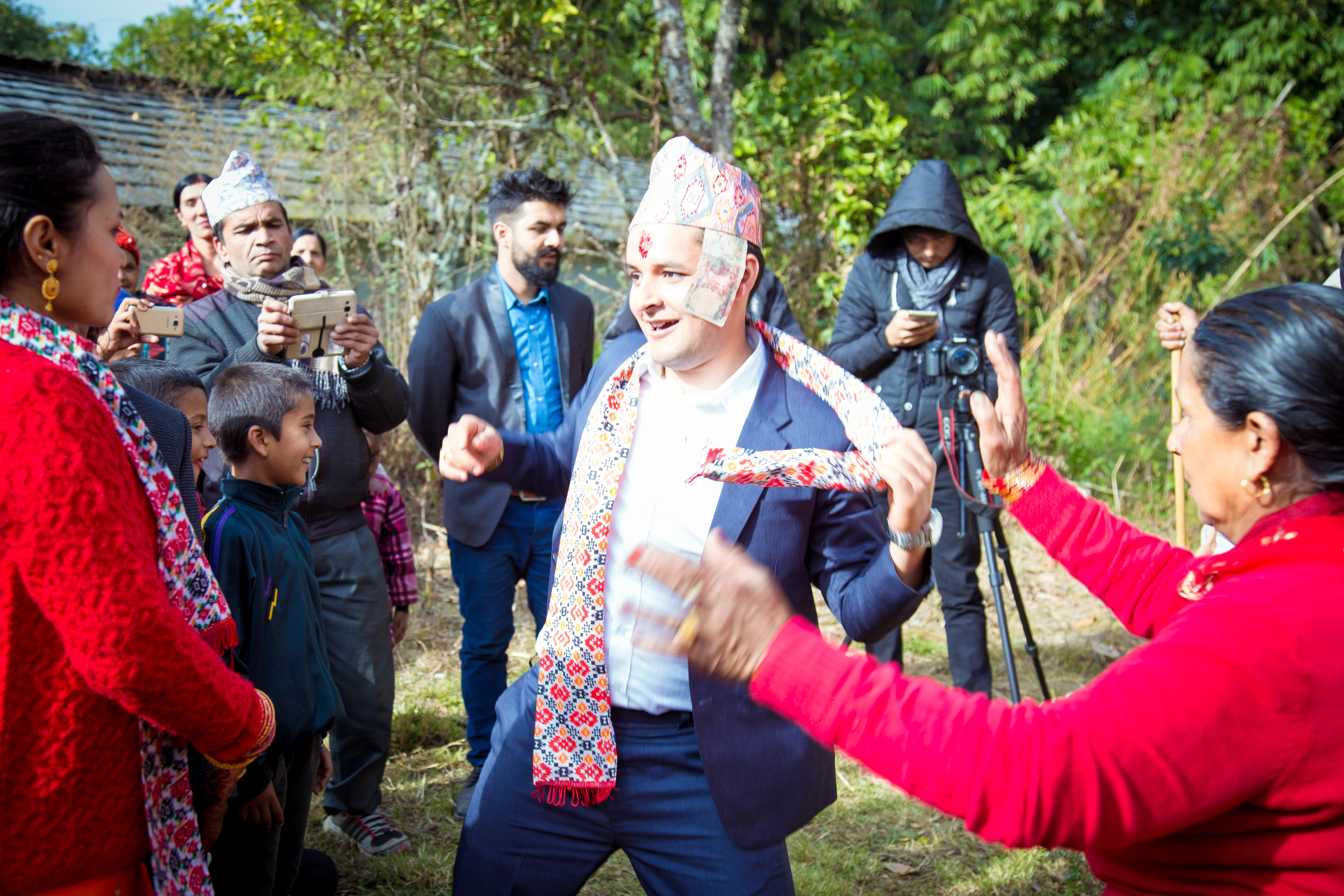
Villagers dancing on the Baja

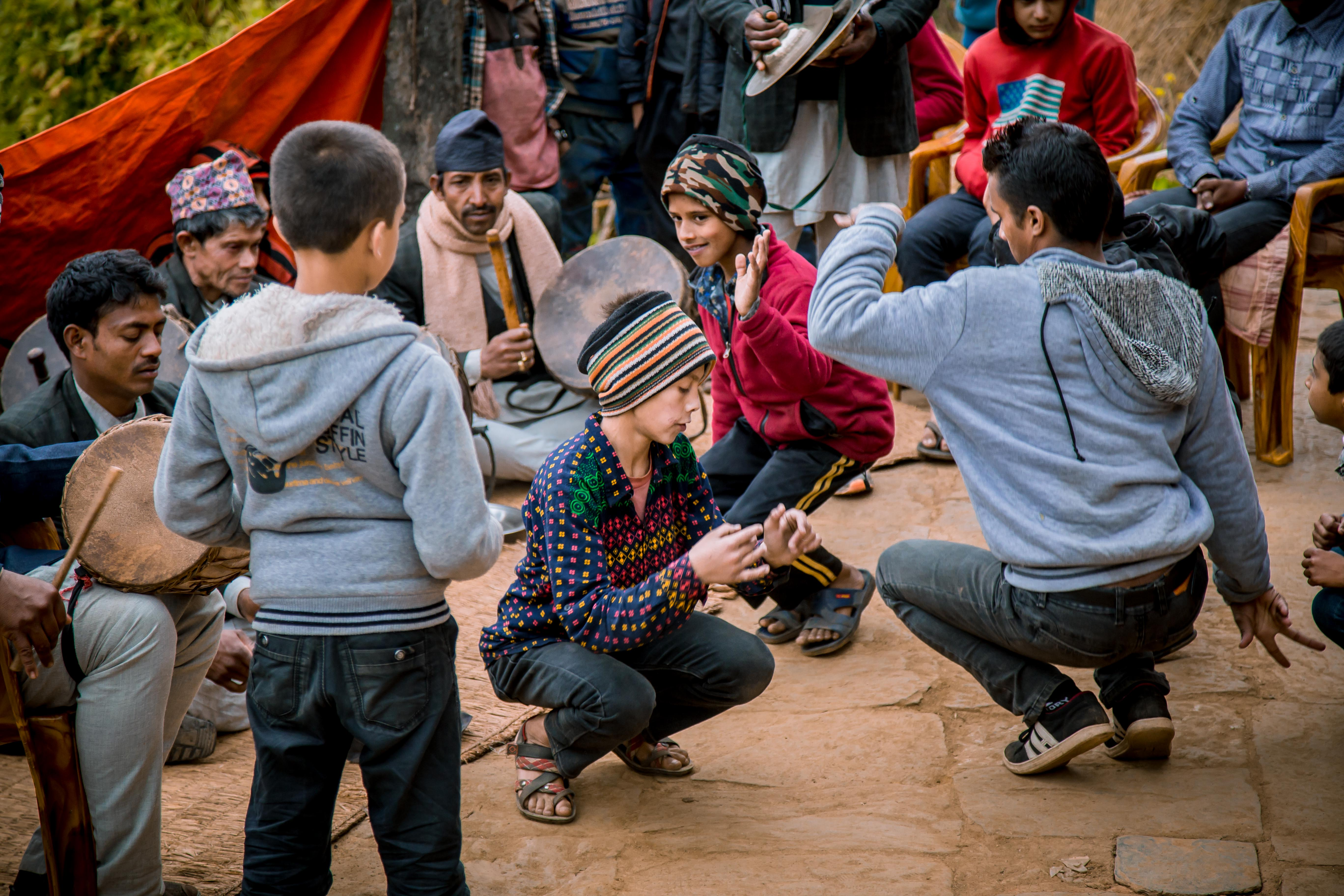
Kids enjoying the baja

Earthquake Karkineta High School was damaged in April 2015

== Geography ==
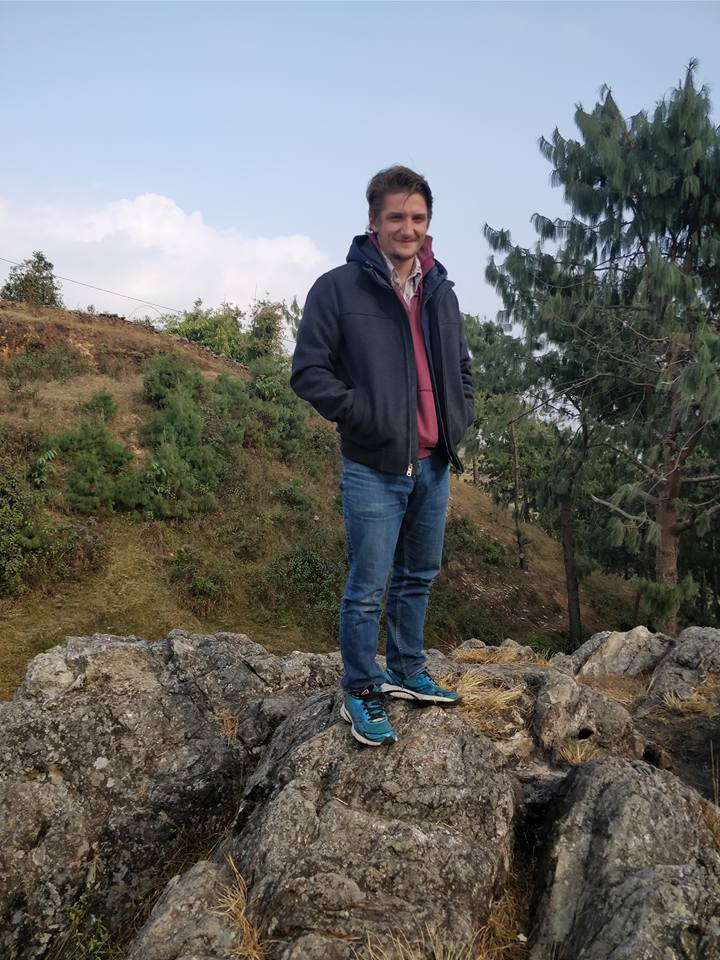
Tourist in Karkineta- Bagh Dhunga

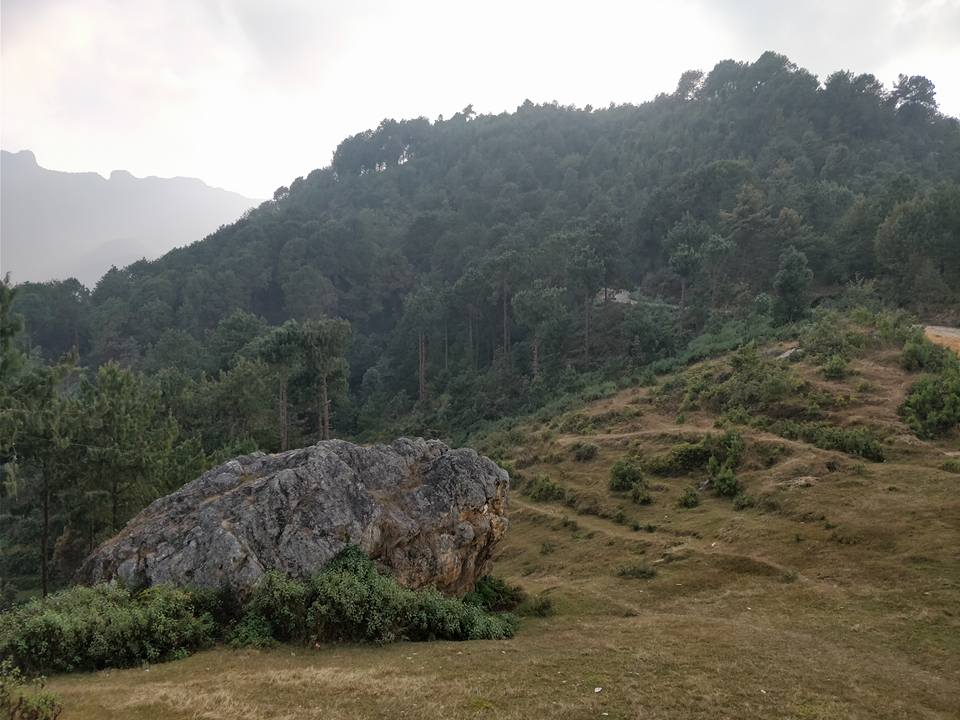
Bagh dhunga

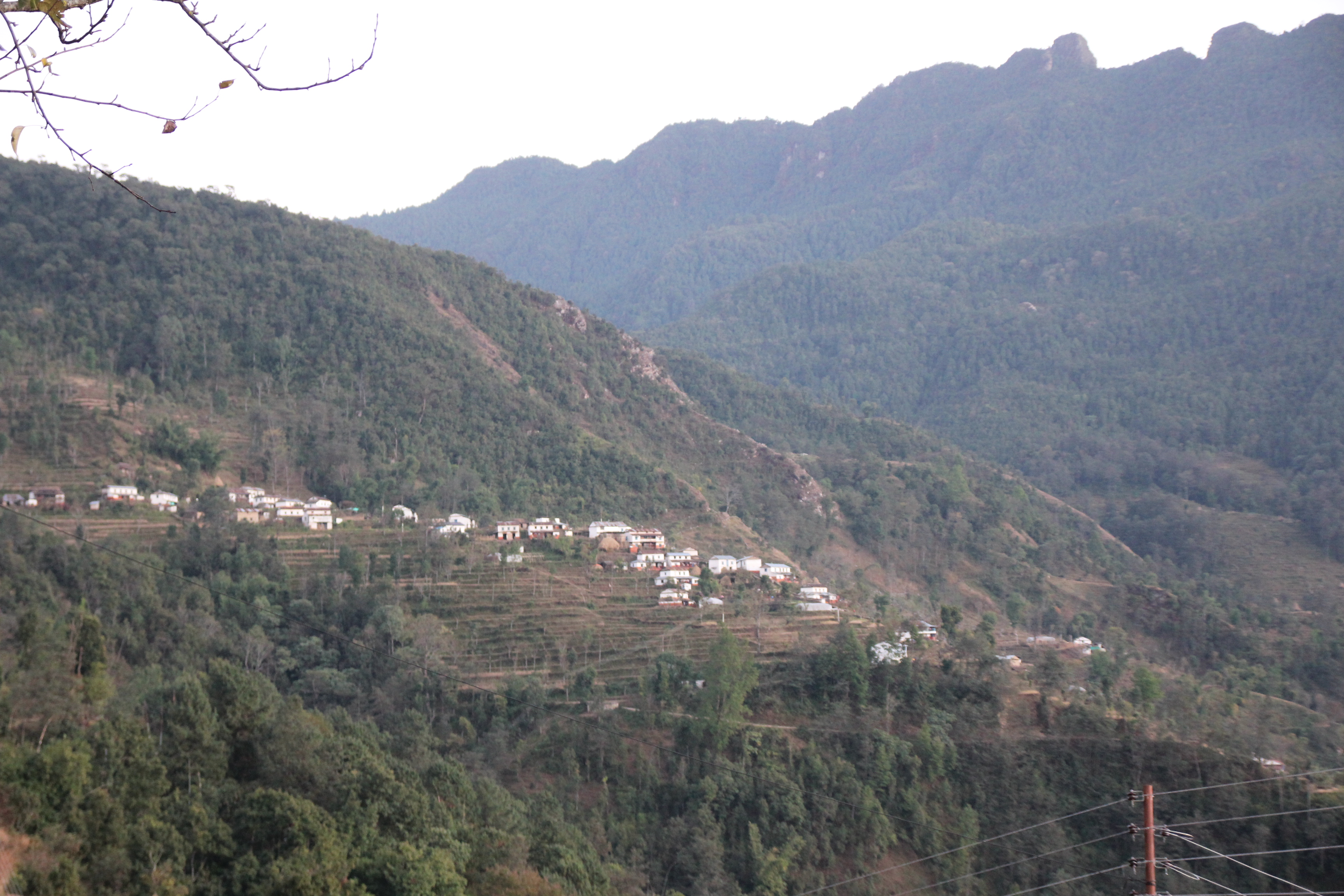
Dahare deurali PARBAT AND Khuma village

DAHARE (add info)
