= Dhairing =

Dhairing धाइरिङ Jaljala Gaupalika 7
- Village development committee
- Location in Nepal Dhairing (Nepal)
- Coordinates: 28.32°N 83.62°E
- Country: Nepal
- Zone: Dhawalagiri Zone
- District: Parbat District
- Province: Gandaki Province

Population (2011)
  - Total: 3,456
- Time zone: UTC+5:45 (Nepal Time)
- Postal code: 33401

Dhairing is a village development committee in Parbat District in the Dhawalagiri Zone of central Nepal. At the time of the 2011 Nepal census it had a population of 3456 people living in 896 individual households. Temple Bhume Thann is located here.
