= Phalebas Khanigaun =

Phalebas Khanigaun फलेबास खानीगाउँ
- Village development committee
- Location in Nepal Phalebas Khanigaun (Nepal)
- Coordinates: 28.17°N 83.67°E
- Country: Nepal
- Zone: Dhaulagiri Zone
- District: Parbat District

Population (1991)
  - Total: 1,789
- Time zone: UTC+5:45 (Nepal Time)

Phalebas Khanigaun is a village development committee in Parbat District in the Dhaulagiri Zone of central Nepal. At the time of the 1991 Nepal census it had a population of 1789 people living in 362 individual households.
