= Pangrang =

Pangrang पाङ्ग्राङ
- Village development committee
- Location in Nepal Pangrang (Nepal)
- Coordinates: 28.12°N 83.64°E
- Country: Nepal
- Zone: Dhawalagiri Zone
- District: Parbat District

Population (1991)
  - Total: 2,595
- Time zone: UTC+5:45 (Nepal Time)

Pangrang is a village development committee in Parbat District in the Dhawalagiri Zone of central Nepal. At the time of the 1991 Nepal census it had a population of 2595 people living in 482 individual households.
