= Deurali, Parbat =

Deurali देउराली
- Village development committee
- Location in Nepal Deurali (Nepal)
- Coordinates: 28.31°N 83.71°E
- Country: Nepal
- Zone: Dhaulagiri Zone
- District: Parbat District

Population (1991)
  - Total: 2,146
- Time zone: UTC+5:45 (Nepal Time)

Deurali, Dhawalagiri is a village development committee in Parbat District in the Dhaulagiri Zone of central Nepal. At the time of the 1991 Nepal census it had a population of 2146 people living in 454 individual households.
