= Bachchha =

Bachchha बाच्छा
- Village development committee
- Location in Nepal Bachchha (Nepal)
- Coordinates: 28.09°N 83.61°E
- Country: Nepal
- Zone: Dhawalagiri Zone
- District: Parbat District

Population (1991)
  - Total: 2,514
- Time zone: UTC+5:45 (Nepal Time)

Bachchha is a village development committee in Parbat District in the Dhawalagiri Zone of central Nepal. At the time of the 1991 Nepal census it had a population of 2514 people living in 518 individual households.
