= Arthar Dadakharka =

Arthar Dandakharka आर्थर डाँडाखर्क
- Village development committee
- Location in Nepal Arthar Dandakharka (Nepal)
- Coordinates: 28.21°N 83.78°E
- Country: Nepal
- Zone: Gandagi Zone
- District: Parbat District

Population (1991)
  - Total: 3,585
- Time zone: UTC+5:45 (Nepal Time)

'Arthar Dandakharka is in Gandaki province kushma municipality ward number 14 Parbat District central Nepal. At the time of the 2015 Nepal census it had a population of 3585 people living in 724 individual households.
