= Limithana =

Limithana लिमिठाना
- Village development committee
- Location in Nepal Limithana (Nepal)
- Coordinates: 28.16°N 83.67°E
- Country: Nepal
- Zone: Dhawalagiri Zone
- District: Parbat District

Population (1991)
  - Total: 1,596
- Time zone: UTC+5:45 (Nepal Time)

Limithana is a village development committee in Parbat District in the Dhawalagiri Zone of western Nepal. At the time of the 1991 Nepal census it had a population of 1596 people living in 310 individual households.
