= Tribeni, Parbat =

Binayee Triveni, Nepal त्रिबेणी
- Rural municipality
- Location in Nepal Binayee Triveni, Nepal (Nepal)
- Coordinates: 28.03°N 83.66°E
- Country: Nepal
- Province: Gandaki Province
- District: Parbat

Area
  - Total: 750 km^{2} (288 sq mi)

Population (2011)
  - Total: 33,119
  - Density: 115/km^{2} (300/sq mi)
- Time zone: UTC+5:45 (Nepal Time)
- Postal code: 33007

Tribeni, Nepal is a Binayee Triveni Rural municipality in Parbat District in Gandaki Province of central Nepal. At the time of the 2011 Nepal census it had a population of 33119.
