= Mahashila Rural Municipality =

Gaunpalika in Parbat District in Gandaki of Nepal

Mahashila Rural Municipality महाशिला गाउँपालिका
- Gaunpalika
- Location in Gandaki Province Mahashila Rural Municipality (Nepal)
- Coordinates: 28°04′59″N 83°40′26″E
- Country: Nepal
- Province: Gandaki
- District: Parbat

Government
  - Chairperson: Iswori Bhusal ( NCP-UML)
  - Deputy Chairperson: Dhan Subha BK (NCP-UML)

Area
  - Total: 50 km^{2} (19 sq mi)

Population (2011 national census)
  - Total: 9,857
  - Density: 200/km^{2} (510/sq mi)
- Time zone: UTC+5:45 (Nepal Time)
- Website: https://mahashilamun.gov.np

Mahashila Rural Municipality (Nepali : महाशिला गाउँपालिका) is a Gaunpalika in Parbat District in Gandaki of Nepal. On 12 March 2017, the government of Nepal implemented a new local administrative structure, with the implementation of the new local governance structure, Village Development Committees have been merged to form Municipalities and Gaunpalikas.

Mahashila is one of these 753 local units. It is subdivided into 6 wards. Mahashila Rural Municipality is surrounded by Syangja district on the East, Bihadi Rural Municipality on the West, Phalewas municipality on the North, and Paiyun Rural Municipality on the South. Mahashila is named after the name of Dhunwakot and Paiyun Dhunwakot. This region, which is important for a timely religious touristic view of the region, is the name of the Vishal Shila (a great stone of the world). The mountain of Golang is spread from south to south in the south side of the valley of Kaligandaki, situated in the village of Mahshshla. Hosrangdi, Bhoksing, Balakot, Pakhapani, Lunkhu Deurali, Kurgha (Ward no 7 and 8) and Phalamkhani Village development committees (VDCs) were incorporated to form Mahashila Rural Municipality. This rural municipality came into existence on 10 March 2017.

== Infrastructure ==
Administrative Building

The municipality recently completed a modern 30-room administrative building in Kafaldanda.

== History ==
The history of Mahashila Rural Municipality is deeply tied to the administrative evolution of Nepal and the cultural-geographical heritage of the Parbat region. Before the introduction of federalism, the area that now forms Mahashila consisted of several independent Village Development Committees (VDCs) — namely Hosrangdi, Bhoksing, Balakot, Pakhapani, Lunkhu Deurali, Phalamkhani, and a portion of Kurgha. These villages functioned as separate local bodies for decades, relying primarily on traditional community institutions, ward-level committees, and local councils for governance. The residents of these VDCs shared strong cultural ties, economic interdependence, and common religious and historical traditions, which later contributed to smoother administrative integration.

The most significant modern development occurred on 10 March 2017, when Nepal implemented a new federal structure following the promulgation of the Constitution of Nepal 2015. This restructuring replaced the previous VDC system with 753 new local level units, in which Mahashila Rural Municipality was formally established as one of the rural municipalities of Parbat District. The merger aimed to improve local governance, decentralize authority, enhance service delivery, and encourage planned development in previously underserved rural areas.

The name “Mahashila” originates from a massive rock formation situated in the region, known locally as Mel Dhunga ( मेल ढुंगा).” This natural structure is not only a geographical landmark but also a cultural and religious symbol. Traditionally, the rock has been associated with Lord Shiva, and the surrounding area has been a pilgrimage and gathering place for rituals, particularly during Shivaratri. This heritage made the name suitable for the newly formed municipality, symbolizing unity, identity, and historical continuity.

Following its establishment, Mahashila underwent a phase of institutional formation, including the creation of ward offices, administrative committees, and the election of the first local government representatives in 2017. One of the early milestones was the development of administrative headquarters in Balakot, which was later expanded with the construction of a large multi-room municipal complex completed in the mid-2020s. This facility marked a major step toward centralized governance, replacing the earlier system where services were scattered across temporary or rented buildings.

In recent years, Mahashila has seen significant policy changes and development initiatives. Among the most notable is the introduction of the “No Home Birth” policy, which reflects the municipality’s commitment to improving public health and reducing maternal and neonatal mortality. Road development, drinking water projects, and health infrastructure — including the construction of a 10-bed basic hospital — have also become central features of the municipality’s modern history.

== Tourism ==
Mahashila is regarded as a hidden gem of Parbat, with potential for ecotourism and geotourism.

Major Attractions • Mahashila (मेल ढुंगा): Huge rock plateau worshipped as a symbol of Shiva • Chisapani Lake • Gorakhlang Lake • Panyunkot viewpoint • Ekkanne Chaur • Dhunwakot ridge • Gangadhar Cave

== Weather and Climate ==
In Parbat district, all kinds of water is found tropical, and temperate. Most of the cold water is found in the axis such as Dhunwakot, Chisapani, Golrang, covering the Mahabharat series starting from Panchase. Although all the parts of the Mahashila are pre-cordial, the warmth of the sunrise occurs. At the lower level, heat water will be found. Paiyun River (Seti Khola) is the area with origin. Maheshshila has constructed dozens of ponds on the hill tower due to lack of production in the water source.

== Demographics ==
At the time of the 2011 Nepal census, Mahashila Rural Municipality had a population of 9,858. Of these, 79.4% spoke Nepali, 13.7% Gurung, 6.6% Magar, 0.2% Newar and 0.1% other languages as their first language.

In terms of ethnicity/caste, 22.7% were Hill Brahmin, 15.9% Kami, 15.8% Chhetri, 14.1% Gurung, 9.1% Magar, 9.0% Thakuri, 8.1% Sarki, 3.7% Damai/Dholi, 1.2% Gharti/Bhujel and 0.4% others.

In terms of religion, 79.6% were Hindu, 17.6% Buddhist and 2.8% Bon.

Looking at the population of Mahashila, Sucha as ward No. 1 in Hosrangdi 1599, Ward No.2 in Bhoksing 999, ward No.3 in Balakot 1313, Ward No. 4 in Pakhapani 239, Ward No. 5 in Lukhu 2747, Ward No. 6 in Phalamkhani 917 and the total population is 9857. In this village, the total population of Brahmin is 2302, the population of 1598 Kshetri, the population of Kami tribe is 1529, the population of the Gurung is 964, the population of Thakuri 809, the population of Sarki is 613, the population of Damai is 325 and the other population is 381.

The total area of the Mahashila Rural Municipality is 49.38 km2 (16.07 sq mi) and the total population of the rural municipality according to 2011 (2068 BS) Nepal census is 9857 1individual. The density of this rural municipality is 200/km2 (520/sq mi). This rural municipality is divided into 7 wards.

== Landmarks ==
Chasapani Lake (2266 mi), Lake (Gorakhlang), worlds biggest Mahashila, Panyukot, Dhuwakot, Ekkanne Chaur, Gangadhar cave etc. are present in this village. There are historic heritage sites such as Paiyunkot, Dhunwakot, Chisapani, Balakot, Ranipaniin this Gaunpalika. Here is the Ganges of the Ganges, Chisapani forest, Forest of Golrang, Forest of Damsing, various Patan, Various Deurali, Man-made Home Stay. Himshila, it can be reached only from 3 hours to 4 hours from Pokhara.

This Mahashila land is an outside area of 1,30,000 cubic meters. Local people also call it Maldhunga. Here, there will be regular prayers and special worship like Shivratri, Balachaturdasi, and worship of Lord Shivaji. It is said that worship is complete, good health and patience if worshiping here.
