= Bhangara, Nepal =

Bhangara, Nepal Village of Amar Gopal (Nepal)
- Village development committee
- Location in Nepal Bhangara, Nepal (Nepal)
- Coordinates: 28.15°N 83.71°E
- Country: Nepal
- Zone: Dhawalagiri Zone
- District: Parbat District

Population (1991)
  - Total: 2,242
- Time zone: UTC+5:45 (Nepal Time)

Bhangara, Nepal is a village development committee of the Parbat District of the Dhawalagiri Zone in central Nepal. It is located approximately 75 km from Pokhara City and 15 km from the district headquarters Kusma. At the time of the 1991 Nepal census, it had a population of 2242 people living in 421 households.

Bhangara has one high school, Gramodaya High School, and five secondary schools: Majktera, Ulleri, Kaule, Sirubari and Betehani.

The residents of Bhangara are of numerous castes, most notably members of the Gurung, Bahun, Chhetri, Magar, Sharki, Damai, and Kami. They are Hindu, Buddhists and Christians.
