= Kyang =

Kyang क्याङ
- Village development committee
- Location in Nepal Kyang (Nepal)
- Coordinates: 28.31°N 83.68°E
- Country: Nepal
- Zone: Dhawalagiri Zone
- District: Parbat District

Population (1991)
  - Total: 2,279
- Time zone: UTC+5:45 (Nepal Time)
- Postal code: 33400

Kyang is a village development committee in Parbat District in the Dhawalagiri Zone of central Nepal. At the time of the 1991 Nepal census it had a population of 2279 people living in 443 individual households. Kyang is one of the best touristic destination of Parbat district. The hill of Haljure situated at around 2465m altitude is one of the best view point of Parbat.
