= Tilahar =

Tilahar तिलहार
- Village development committee
- Location in Nepal Tilahar (Nepal)
- Coordinates: 28.26°N 83.75°E
- Country: Nepal
- Zone: Dhawalagiri Zone
- District: Parbat District

Government

Population (1991)
  - Total: 4,218
- Time zone: UTC+5:45 (Nepal Time)

Tilahar is a village development committee in Parbat District in the Dhawalagiri Zone of central Nepal. At the time of the 1991 Nepal census it had a population of 4218 people living in 863 individual households. Tilahar is also home to a charity funding construction of schools around remote areas of Nepal. It raises funding through donations and exporting blankets to overseas.

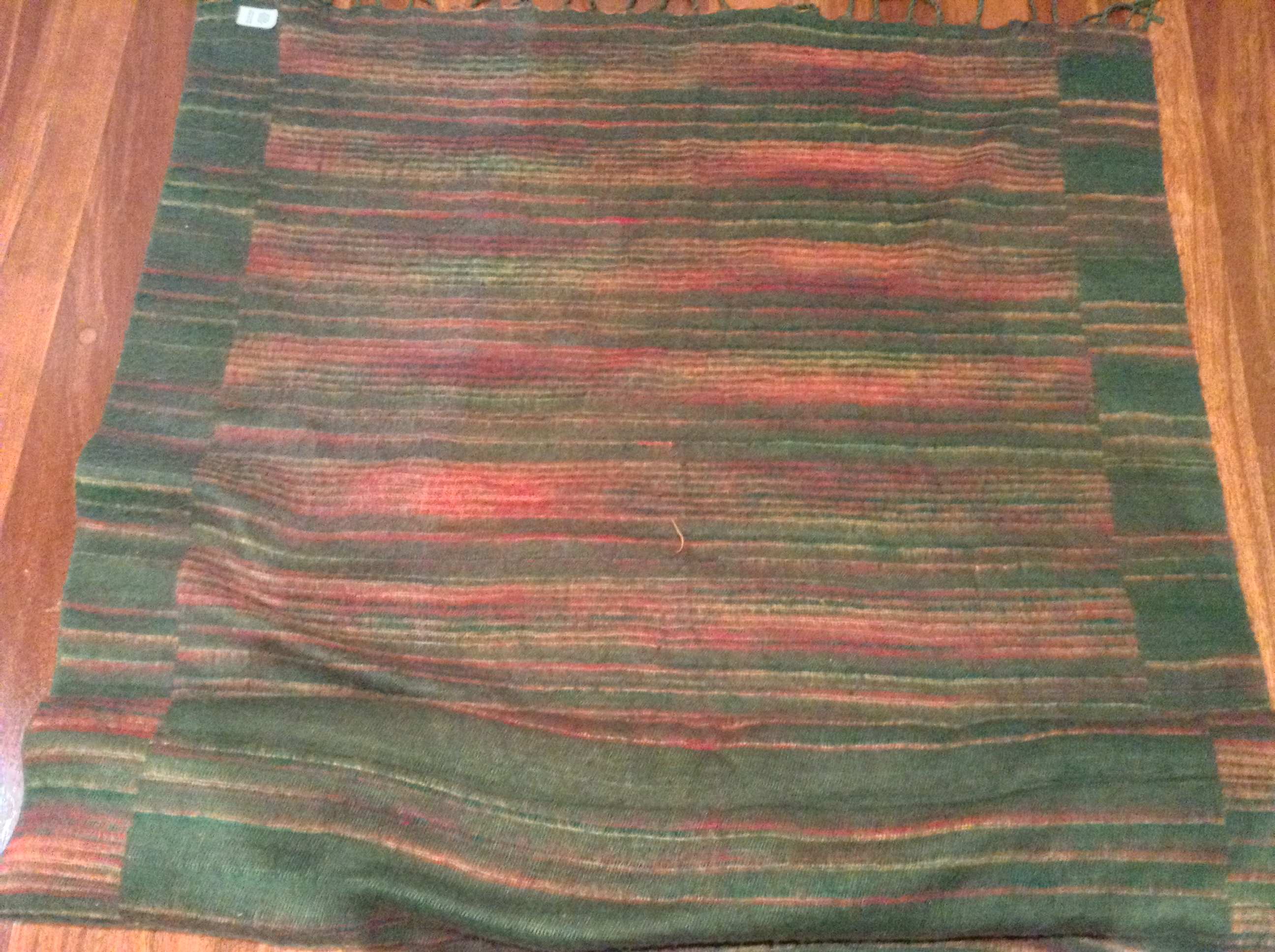
A blanket made in Tilahar
