= Deupurkot =

Deupurkot देउपुरकोट
- Village development committee
- Location in Nepal Deupurkot (Nepal)
- Coordinates: 28.29°N 83.75°E
- Country: Nepal
- Zone: Dhawalagiri Zone
- District: Parbat District

Population (1991)
  - Total: 2,232
- Time zone: UTC+5:45 (Nepal Time)

Deupurkot is a village development committee in Parbat District in the Dhawalagiri Zone of central Nepal. At the time of the 1991 Nepal census it had a population of 2232 people living in 474 individual households.
