= Mallaj Majhphant =

Coordinates: 28.3400°N 83.5800°E

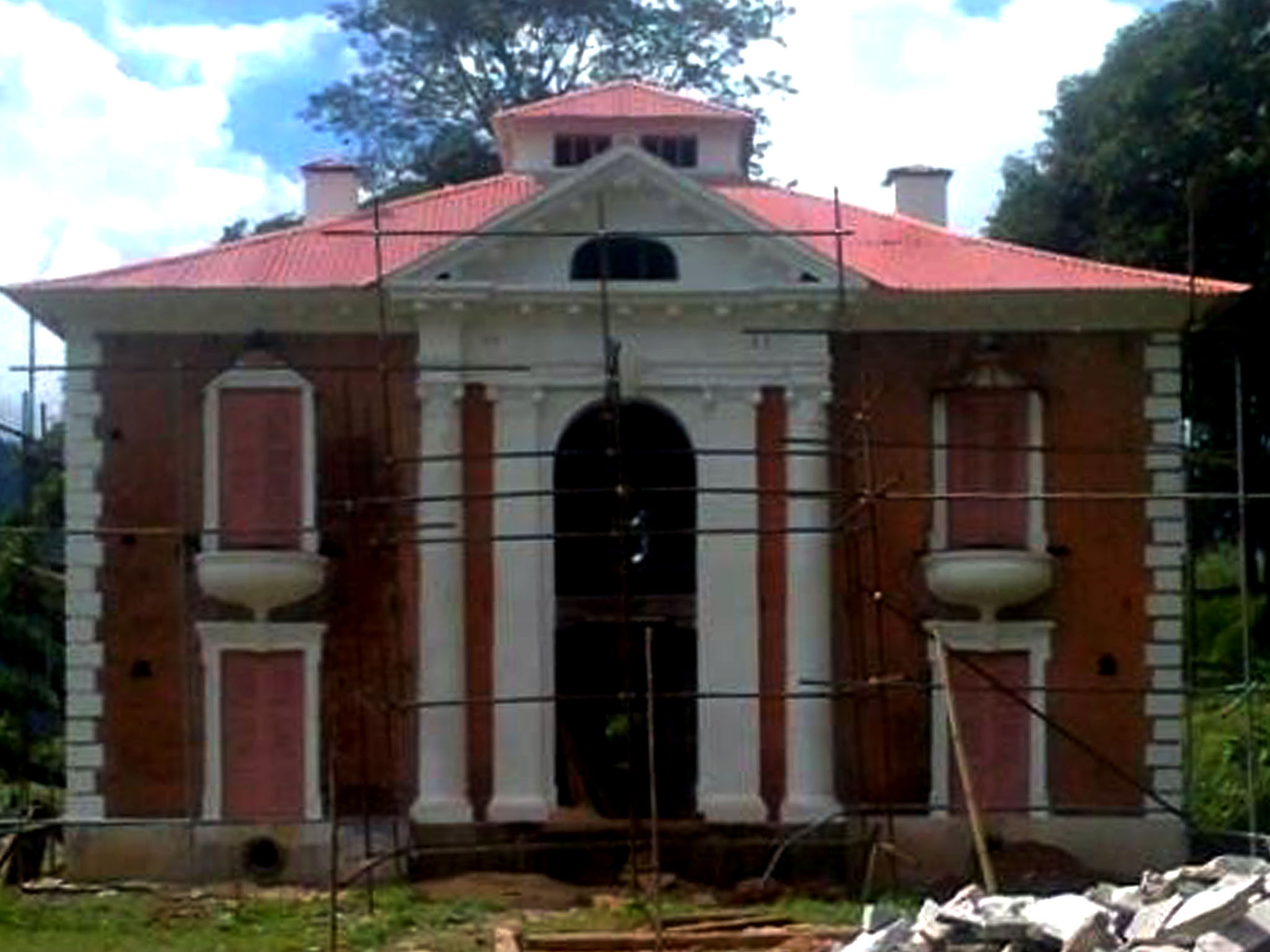
An ancient palace in Nepal.

Mallaj is situated at Majhphant VDC of western Nepal. It has high potential for tourism. Here the resort the name of Heritage of Mallaj. It is famous for pathway from Beni to Mallaj, way of Nangi, Banskharka, Dhairing, and Salija.

Mallaj has many historical places such as Purnagaun Baraha Mandir, Siwalaya Mandir, Gufa Mandir. It is touched VDC with Banskharka VDC which is famous for orange farms.
