= Parbat District =

Coordinates: 28°14′0″N 83°31′0″E

Parbat/Parvat/Parwat पर्वत जिल्ला
- District
- Parbat District
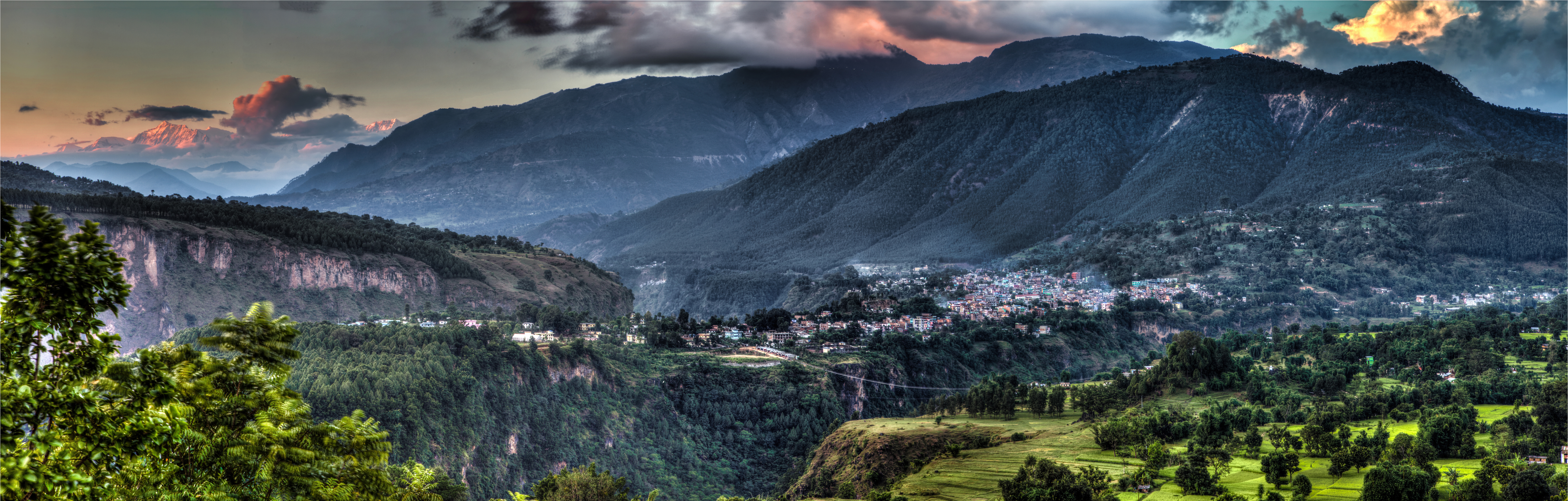
- Panoramic view of Kushma, headquarter of Parbat district
- Interactive map of Parbat/Parvat/Parwat
- Country: Nepal
- Province: Gandaki Province

Government
  - Type: Coordination committee
  - Body: DCC, Parbat

Area
  - Total: 494 km^{2} (191 sq mi)

Population (2011)
  - Total: 145,586
  - Density: 295/km^{2} (763/sq mi)
- Time zone: UTC+05:45 (NPT)
- Telephone Code: 067
- Website: dccparbat.gov.np/en/

Parbat District (Nepali: पर्वत जिल्ला [pʌɾbʌt], is a hilly area of Nepal. It is a part of Gandaki Province and one of the seventy-seven districts of Nepal. The district, with Kusma as its district headquarters, covers an area of 494 km^{2} (191 sq mi) and has a population (2001) of 157,826. It is the fourth-smallest district of Nepal with 47 village development committees (VDCs) currently (before Kushma Municipality was formed, the total VDCs were 55.).

The district is mainly known for the Gupteshwar Cave, which is visited by thousands of pilgrims during the Hindu festival of Shivaratri. Patheshwari Temple is a notable temple in Kushma located at Katuwa Chaupari in Kushma-09. Patheshwori Mandir has many sub-temples inside like Ram Janaki Mandir, Bhagwati, Devi, Hanuman, and others. Alapeshwar cave is a cave in this district. It is also noted for the Dahere Deurali Temple, which is visited by thousands of pilgrims during Bala Chaturdashi. Kamadhenu Mandir is another temple in Parbat district that is located in the Khurkot development committee. Recently the Modi hydro project of 10 M.W. has been constructed in this district. Parbat's biggest playground lies in Phalewas village named Majhi Chour and Indra Chour.

== Geography and climate ==
Parbat district has diversified geographical features. It extends from 28^{0} 00’ 19" N to 28^{0} 23’ 59" N latitude and 83^{0} 33’ 40" E to 83^{0} 49’ 30" E longitude

Climate Zone	Elevation Range	% of Area
Upper Tropical	300 to 1,000 meters 1,000 to 3,300 ft.	17.8%
Subtropical	1,000 to 2,000 meters 3,300 to 6,600 ft.	66.9%
Temperate	2,000 to 3,000 meters 6,400 to 9,800 ft.	14.0%
Subalpine	3,000 to 4,000 meters 9,800 to 13,100 ft.	1.4%

== Demographics ==
Historical population
Census year	Pop.	±% p.a.
1981	128,400	—
1991	143,547	+1.12%
2001	157,826	+0.95%
2011	146,590	−0.74%
2021	132,703	−0.99%
Source: Citypopulation

At the time of the 2021 Nepal census, Parbat District had a population of 130,887. 7.07% of the population is under 5 years of age. It has a literacy rate of 80.12% and a sex ratio of 1122 females per 1000 males. 58,569 (44.75%) lived in municipalities.

Castes/ethnic groups in Baglung district (2021)
1. Bahun (31.3%)
2. Chhetri (17.4%)
3. Magar (11.7%)
4. Kami (9.84%)
5. Damai (8.98%)
6. Sarki (7.51%)
7. Gurung (3.20%)
8. Thakuri (2.62%)
9. Newar (2.48%)
10. Dasnami (1.34%)
11. Other Hill Janjati (2.43%)
12. Others (1.19%)

Khas people make up 79% of the population, of which Bahun (31%) are the largest group. Khas Dalits are 26% of the population. Hill Janjatis (mainly Magar and Gurung) are 17% of the population.

Languages of Parbat district (2021)
1. Nepali (93.9%)
2. Gurung (2.13%)
3. Magar (1.90%)
4. Others (2.10%)

At the time of the 2021 census, 93.87% of the population spoke Nepali, 2.13% Gurung and 1.90% Magar as their first language. In 2011, 91.7% of the population spoke Nepali as their first language.

Religion in Parbat District (2021)
Religion	Percent
Hinduism	92.70%
Buddhism	5.28%
Christianity	0.59%
Prakriti	0.49%
Islam	0.47%
Bon	0.43%
Other or not stated	0.04%

== Political division ==
Entire Parbat district which had earlier 55 VDCs is now divided into 2 municipalities and 5 rural municipalities (gaunpalika) as listed below:

1. Kushma Municipality
2. Phalewas Municipality
3. Jaljala rural municipality [जलजला_गाउँपालिका]
4. Paiyun Rural Municipality
5. Mahashila Rural Municipality
6. Modi Rural Municipality
7. Bihadi Rural Municipality

== Village development committees (VDCs) and municipalities ==
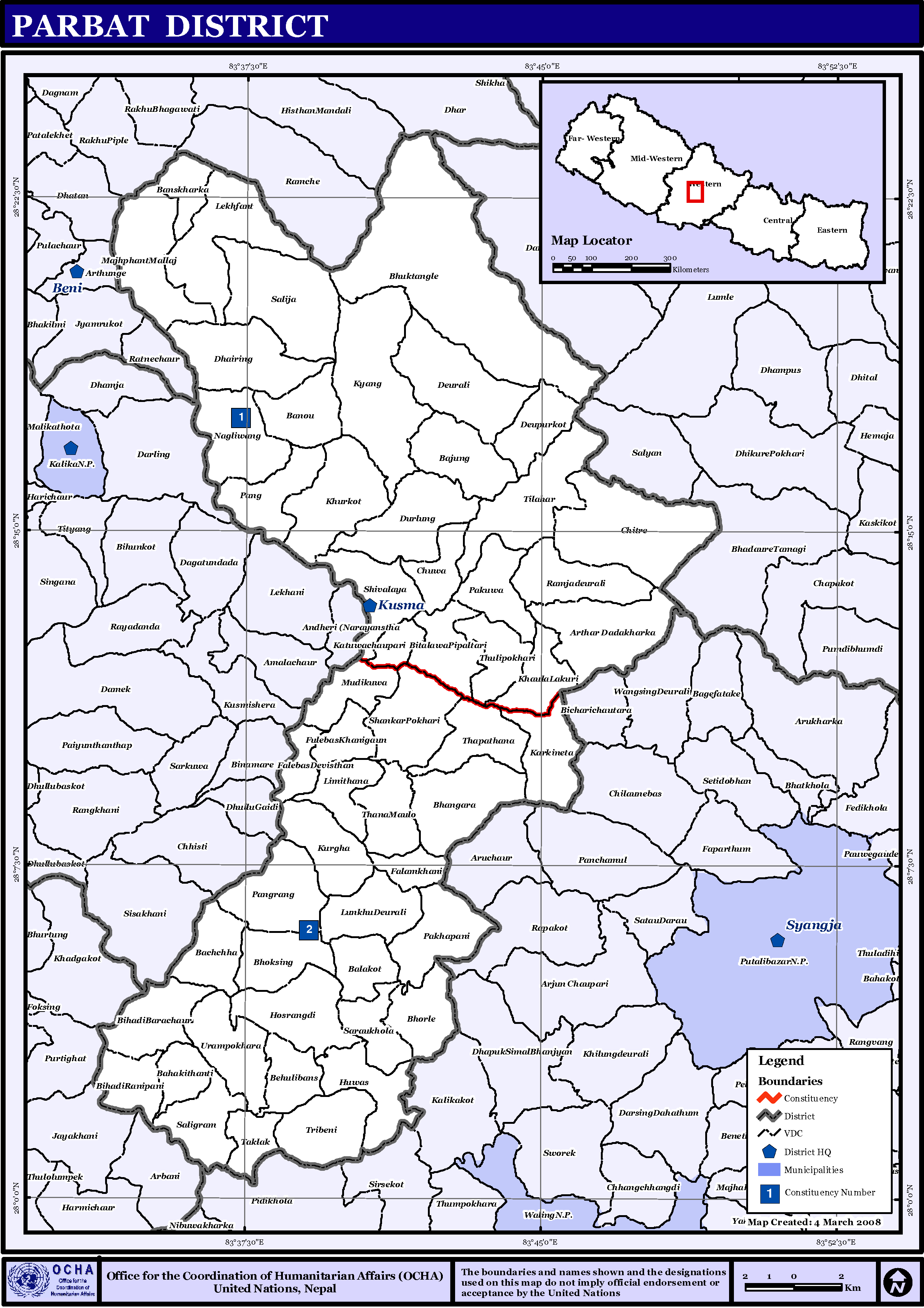
Map of the VDCs in Parbat District

- Arthar Dadakharka
- Bachchha
- Bahaki Thanti
- Bajung
- Balakot
- Banau
- Baskharka
- Behulibas
- Bhangara
- Bhoksing
- Bhorle
- Bhuk Deurali
- Bhuktangle
- Bihadi Barachaur
- Bihadi Ranipani
- Pipaltari
- Chitre
- Chuwa
- Deupurkot
- Deurali
- Devisthan
- Dhairing
- Durlung
- Hosrangdi
- Huwas
- Karkineta
- Katuwa Chaupari
- Khola Lakuri
- Khurkot
- Kurgha
- Kushma Municipality
- Kyang
- Lekhphant
- Limithana
- Lunkhu Deurali
- Mallaj Majhphant
- Mudikuwa
- Nagliwang
- Pakhapani
- Pakuwa
- Pang
- Pangrang
- Phalamkhani
- Phalebas Devisthan
- Phalebas Khanigaun
- Ramja Deurali
- Saligram
- Salija
- Saraukhola
- Shankar Pokhari
- Shivalaya
- Taklak
- Tanglekot
- Thana Maulo
- Thapathana
- Thuli Pokhari
- Tilahar
- Tribeni
- Urampokhara
- Wahakithanti
- 7 Palika

== See also ==
- Zones of Nepal
