= Dhaulagiri Zone =

Coordinates: 28°50′N 83°30′E

Dhaulagiri Zone धौलागिरी अञ्चल
- Zone
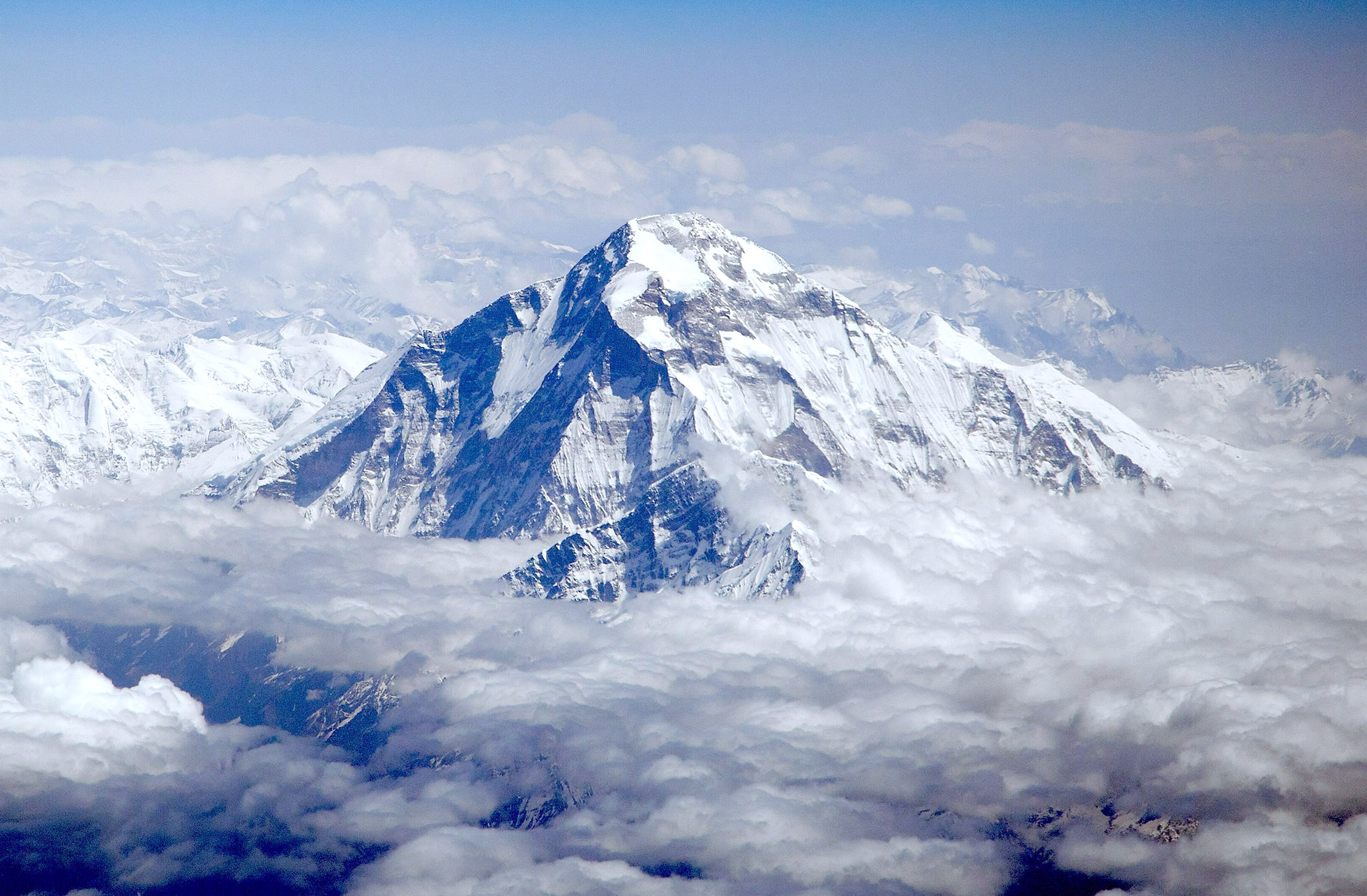
- Aerial view of Dhaulagiri I from the southwest.

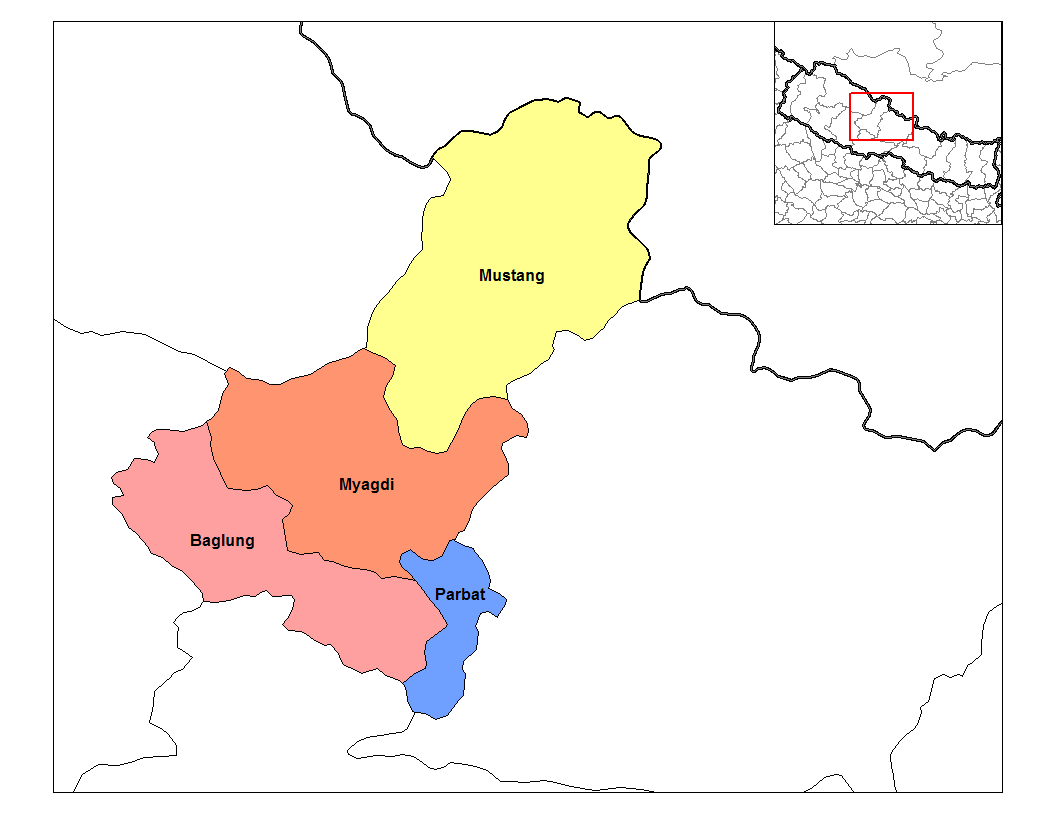
- Dhaulagiri Zone
- Country: Nepal
- Capital: Mahendranagar
- Districts: List: Mustang District; Myagdi District; Parbat District; Baglung District

Area
  - Total: 8,148 km^{2} (3,146 sq mi)

Population (2001)
  - Total: 556,191
  - Density: 68.26/km^{2} (176.8/sq mi)
- Time zone: UTC+5:45 (Nepal Time)

Dhaulagiri (Nepali: धौलागिरी अञ्चल) was one of the fourteen zones which Nepal was divided into for administrative purposes, prior to the September 10, 2015 adoption of a new Constitution, which divided the nation instead into 7 provinces. It is in the Western Development Region of Nepal and its headquarters are Baglung. Famous trekking areas like Mustang, Muktinath, Kali Gandaki valley and Mt Dhaulagiri fall in this zone. Dhorpatan Hunting Reserve, the only hunting reserve in Nepal is spread over Baglung and Myagdi Districts of this zone.

== Administrative subdivisions ==
Dhaulagiri was divided into four districts; since 2015 these districts have been redesignated as part of Gandaki Province.

District	Type	Headquarters	Since 2015 part of Province
Baglung	Hill	Baglung	Gandaki Province
Mustang	Mountain	Jomsom	Gandaki Province
Myagdi	Hill	Beni	Gandaki Province
Parbat	Hill	Kusma	Gandaki Province

== Dhaulagiri circuit ==
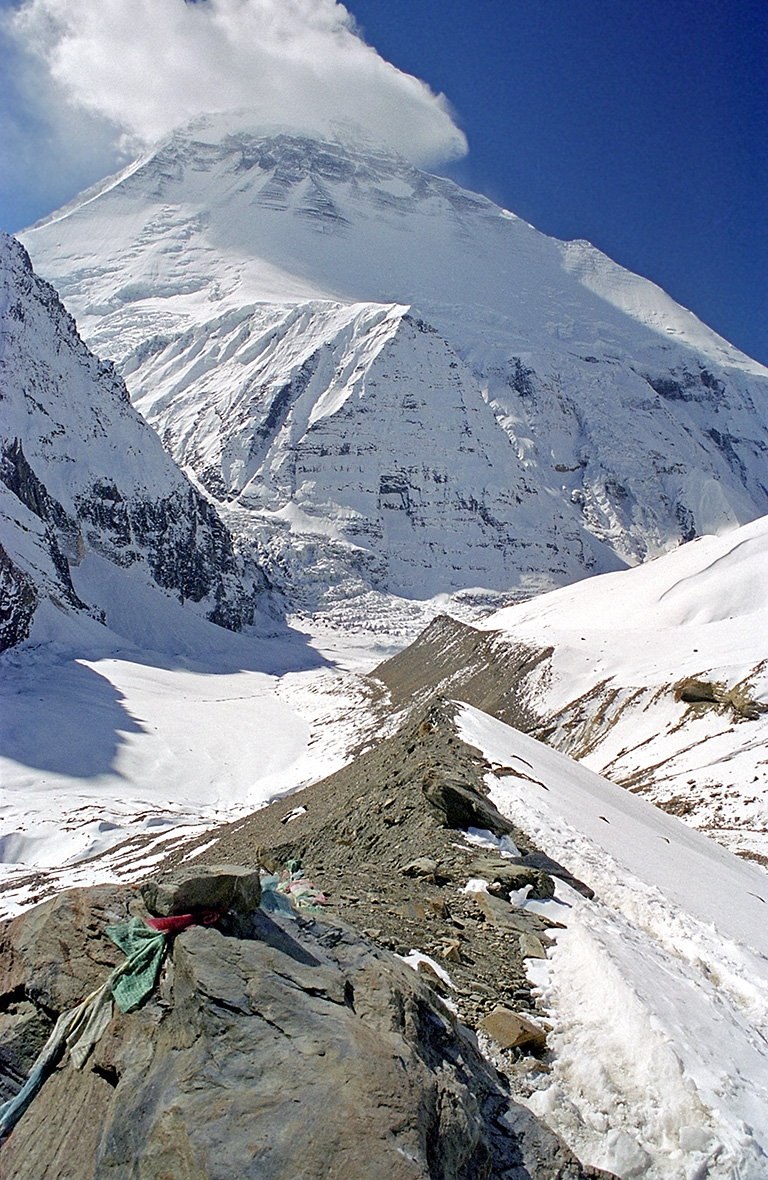
Dhaulagiri Mountain Range

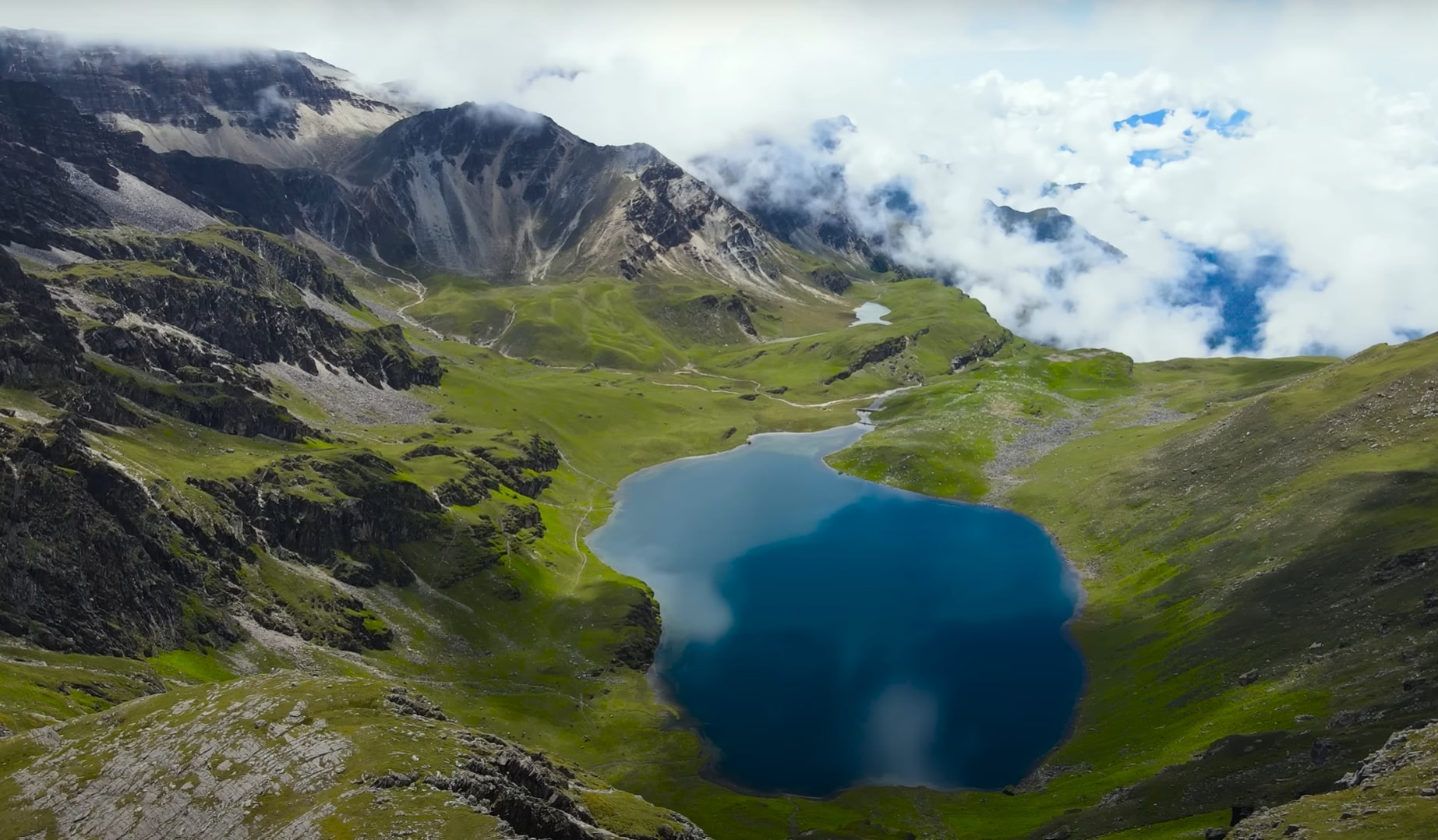
Lower Himalayan lake, known as Sun Daha, in Eastern Rukum

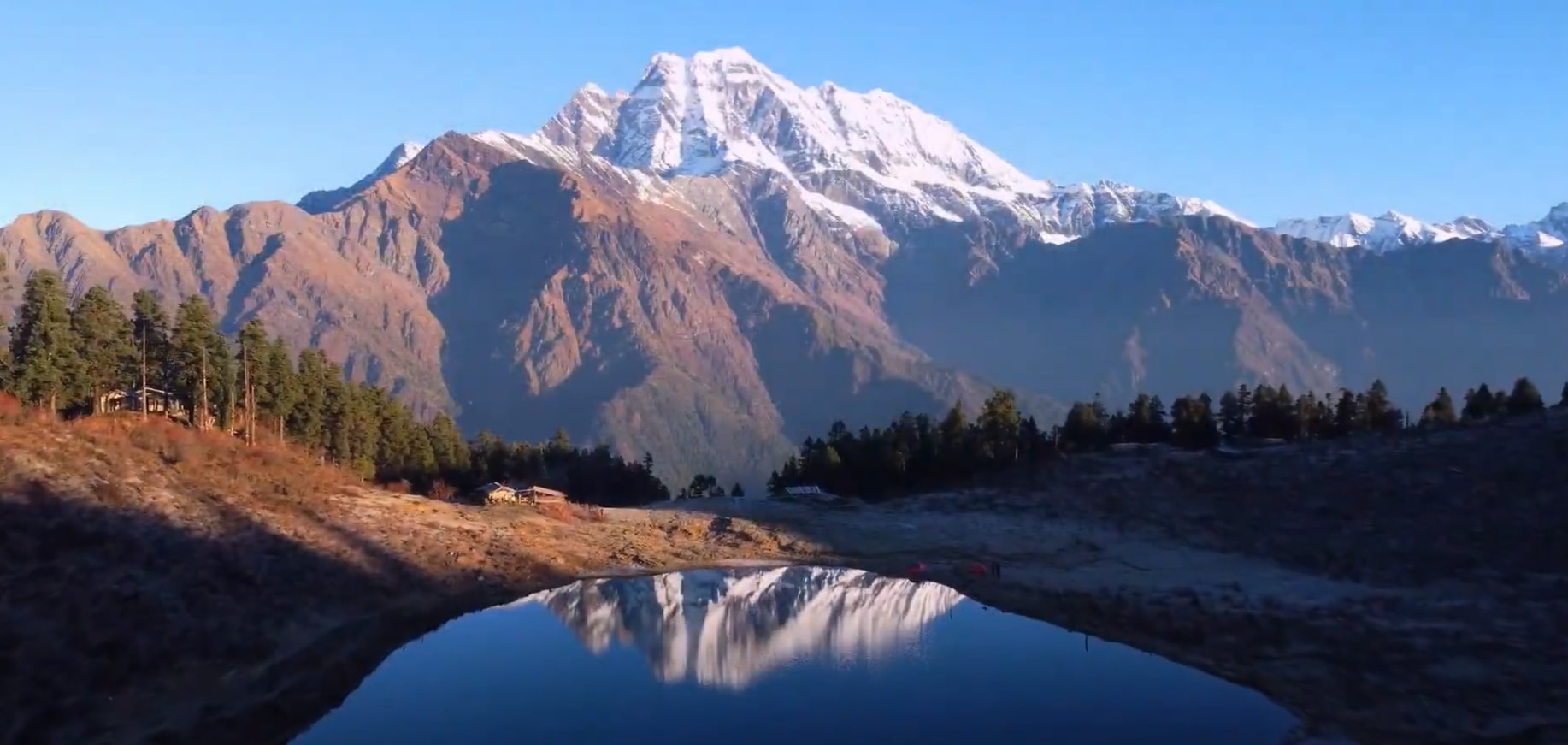
Mount Sisne (Eastern Rukum) along the mountain range

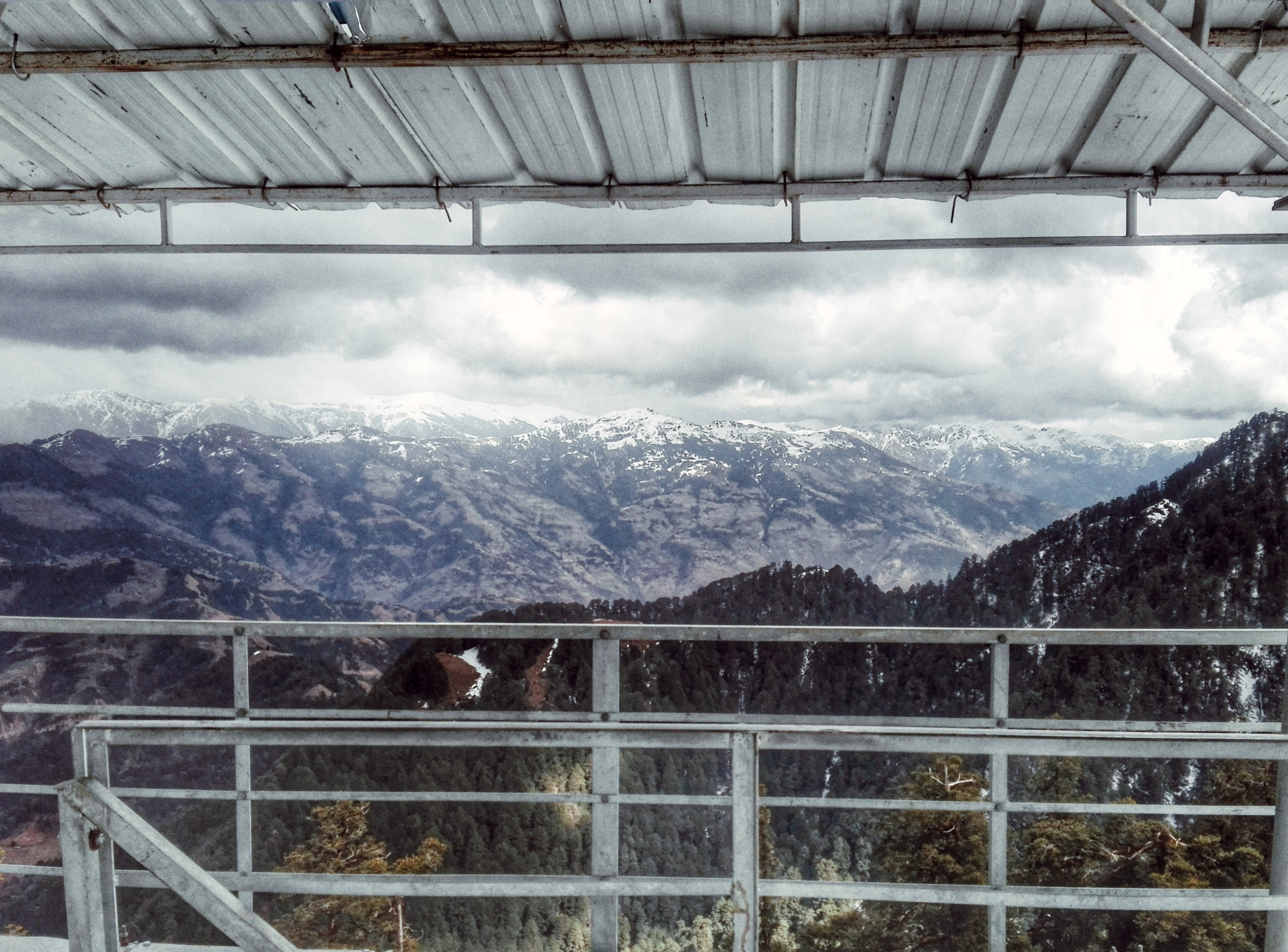
Hills and Himalayas of Northern Lumbini Province

The Dhaulagiri circuit in Eastern Rukum encompasses the Dhaulagiri mountain range of the northern Lumbini Province. The Dhaulagiri mountain range extends from the northwest to the northeast of Eastern Rukum district and then continues eastward to its tallest peak at Dhaulagiri I. Putha Hiunchuli (Dhaulagiri VII), one of the most popular 7,000-metre mountains, was first climbed by British explorer J. O. M. Roberts and Sherpa Ang Nyima in 1954.

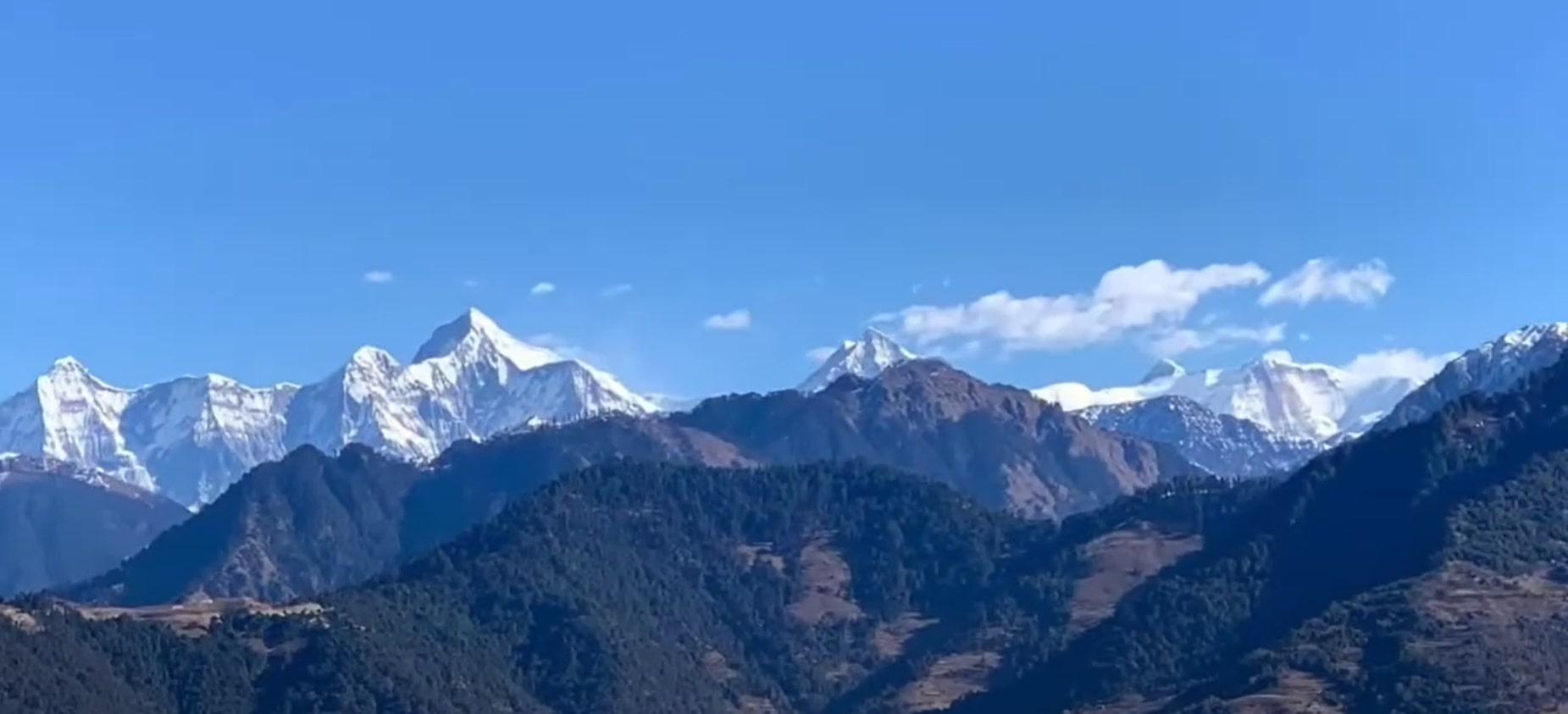
Dhaulagiri Mountain Range in Eastern Rukum features some of the most popular 7,000-meter mountains of the Himalayas

The West Dhaulagiri circuit is a tourist trekking circuit close to the Dhaulagiri mountain range and Magar-majority villages, with a distinct preserved Kham Magar culture of the northern Lumbini province.The circuit's eastern portion is situated along the Dhorpatan reserve of Eastern Rukum, which was designated to preserve high-altitude ecosystems in western Nepal in 1983. The reserve harbours alpine, sub-alpine and high temperate vegetation and 137 species of birds. Endangered animals in the reserve include the musk deer, wolf, red panda, cheer pheasant and danphe.

== See also ==
- Development Regions of Nepal (Former)
- List of zones of Nepal (Former)
- List of districts of Nepal
