= Gurung language =

Sino-Tibetan language spoken in Nepal and India

Gurung
- तमु भाषा (Tamu Bhāṣā)
- तमु क्यी (Tamu Kyi)
- The word "Gurung" (Tamu Kyi) written in Devanagari script
- Native to: Nepal, India, Bhutan
- Ethnicity: 540,000 Gurung (2021 census)
- Native speakers: 380,000 (2021 census)
- Language family: Sino-Tibetan: Tibeto-Burman; Tamangic; Gurung–Tamang; Gurung
- Writing system: Khema, Devanagari and Tibetan

Official status
- Official language in: India: Sikkim

Language codes
- ISO 639-3: gvr
- Glottolog: guru1261

Gurung (Devanagari: गुरुङ), also known as Tamu Kyi (तमु क्यी, tamu kyī; Tibetan: རྟམུ་སྐད་) or Tamu Bhāṣā (तमु भाषा, tamu bhāṣā), is a Sino-Tibetan language spoken by the Gurung people of Nepal. The total number of all Gurung speakers in Nepal was 227,918 in 1991 and 325,622 in 2011.

The official language of Nepal, Nepali, is an Indo-Aryan language, whereas Gurung is a Sino-Tibetan language. Gurung is one of the major languages of Nepal, and is also spoken in India, Bhutan, and by diaspora communities in places such as Singapore and Hong Kong.

== Geographical distribution ==
Gurung is spoken in the following districts of Nepal and India (Ethnologue):

- Gandaki Province: Kaski District, Syangja District, Lamjung District, Tanahu District, Gorkha District, Manang District and Mustang District
- Dhawalagiri Zone: Parbat district
- Sikkim: South Sikkim, West Sikkim, East Sikkim

== Classification ==
At higher levels, Gurung is a member of the Tibeto-Burman (or Trans-Himalayan) family. Robert Shafer classified Gurung within the Bodic division, sub-grouping that into Bodish and West Central Himalayish. Within the Bodish "Section", he located "Bodish" languages (including the Tibetan varieties) and also the "Gurung Branch", including Gurung, Tamang (Murmi), and Thakali (Thaksya). Based on lexical cognates established by Shafer and updated by George van Driem, Shafer constructed the Bodish sub-grouping into three sub-divisions: (1) Western, (2) Central and Southern (a.k.a. “old Bodish”, including Tibetan), and (3) Eastern (containing “archaic” languages like Mönpa) and mainstream languages. Noonan referred to the Western sub-grouping within Bodish as Manange/Nyeshangte and Nar-Phu and Gurungic (containing Gurung, Thakali and Chantyal). He noted that Chantyal is structurally deviant due to more extensive contact-induced language change from Nepali. Sten Konow classified Himalayan T-B languages into pronominalized and non-prominalized, where Gurung is located. This classification is similar to Voeglin & Voeglin (1965), but within a "Gyarung-Mishmi" sub-family within Sino-Tibetan.

== Grammar ==
Phonetically, Gurung languages are tonal.

Some miscellaneous grammatical features of the Gurung languages are:

- CV, CCV, CCCV syllables
- Maximum of three suffixes
- SOV
- Postpositions
- Grammatical case expressed with preposition
- Genitives
- Adjectives and relatives before head noun
- Numerals after head
- Rising intonation in bipolar questions
- Prefix on negative verbs
- No subject or object agreement in verbs
- Split ergativity based on tense
- Causatives
- Benefactives

== Phonology ==
=== Consonants ===
		Labial	Dental/ Alveolar	Retroflex	Post-alv./ Palatal	Velar	Glottal
Stop	voiceless	p	t	ʈ		k	(ʔ)
Stop	aspirated	pʰ	tʰ	ʈʰ		kʰ	
Stop	voiced	b	d	ɖ		ɡ	
Stop	breathy	(bʱ)	(dʱ)	(ɖʱ)		(ɡʱ)	
Affricate	voiceless		ts*		tʃ		
Affricate	aspirated		tsʰ*		tʃʰ		
Affricate	voiced		dz*		dʒ		
Affricate	breathy		(dzʱ)*		(dʒʱ)		
Fricative		(β)	s		ʃ	(x)	h
Nasal		m	n			ŋ	
Rhotic			r				
Lateral			l				
Approximant		w			j		

- *- Across dialects, palato-alveolar affricate sounds /tʃ, tʃʰ, dʒ, (dʒʱ)/ may phonemically occur as apico-alveolar sounds /ts, tsʰ, dz, (dzʱ)/, and then when preceding a /j/ they are then phonetically heard as palato-alveolar [tʃ, tʃʰ, dʒ, dʒʰ].
- Breathy-voiced sounds [bʱ, dʱ, ɖʱ, ɡʱ, dʒʱ, dzʱ*] typically are heard from Nepali loanwords.
- /pʰ/ can also be heard as [f] when followed by front vowels.
- /kʰ/ can have an allophone of [x].
- /r/ can also be heard as a tap [ɾ].
- A glottal stop [ʔ] is heard when there is no initial consonant before a vowel.
- Sounds /p, t, k/ can be heard as unreleased [p̚, t̚, k̚] when in word-final position.

=== Vowels ===
	Front	Central	Back
High	i		u
Mid	e		o
Low		a	

- /i, e, a, o/ can have short allophones of [ɪ, ɛ, ʌ, ɔ].

== Writing system ==
For indigenous languages of Nepal, including Gurung, the rise of pluralism and ethnic consciousness has resulted in movements to develop and deploy community orthographies, but it has also resulted in variation and disagreements.

As Noonan (2005) reports, in Gurung, writing primarily has been done through the medium of another language, and so community orthographies tend to be based on pre-existing models of languages of wider communication. According to Glover (2004), attempts at developing an orthography in Gurung go back to 1976, with work to compile the first dictionary of the language. Glover describes the different scripts that have been under consideration by the community, each with their own potential benefits and challenges. Four scripts have been proposed: a system based on the Tibetan script, Devanagari, a Khemaa lipi script (also known as Tamu Khema Phri or Khema Phri), which is a unique alphasyllabary adaptation of Tibetan and Devanagari, and a Romanized script. Glover reported that a plan was in place in 2002 for a forthcoming dictionary of Gurung which included both an (adapted) Devanagari script and also a Roman script, benefitting both literate Gurungs in Nepal and diaspora Gurungs (28-29).

Examples of Gurung language publications that employ orthographies include three books published by Tamu. These use a modified Devanagari orthography, which include subscript dots for nasalized vowels and other special symbols for consonant clusters and tonal and phonation distinctions that are found in Gurung, but not in Nepali. Also included is a 2000 Gurung-Nepali-English dictionary produced by the Tamu Bauddha Sewa Samiti Nepal (Gurung Culture Organization), which also uses a modified Devanagari, and which also includes numerals (e.g., मी1 /mi/ 'eye' vs. मी2 /mi/ 'name') to indicate tone category for individual words. A 2020 Gurung-English-Nepali dictionary, based on the Sikkim variety of Gurung also makes use of a modified Devanagari script, but does not indicate tone.

== See also ==
- Languages of Nepal
- Languages of Bhutan

== Bibliography ==
- J. Burton-Page. (1955). Two studies in Gurungkura: I. tone; II. Rhotacization and retroflexion. Bulletin of the Society of Oriental and African Studies 111–19.
- Viktor S.Doherty. (1974). "The Organizing Principles of Gurung Kinship." Kailash. 2.4: 273–301.
- Warren W. Glover. (1970). Gurung tone and higher levels. Occasional Papers of the Wolfenden society on Tibeto-Burman Linguistics III, Tone systems of Tibeto-Burman languages of Nepal, Pt. I, ed. by Austin Hale and Kenneth L. Pike, 52–73. Studies in tone and phonological segments. Urbana: University of Illinois.
- Warren W. Glover. (1974). Sememic and Grammatical Structures in Gurung (Nepal). Publication No. 49. Norman, OK: SIL Publications.
- Warren W. Glover and Jessie Glover. (1972). A Guide to Gurung Tone. Kathmandu: Tribhuvan University and Summer Institute of Linguistics.
- Warren W. Glover and John K. Landon. (1980). "Gurung Dialects." In Papers in Southeast Asian Languages No. 7, edited by R.L. Trail et al., 9-77. Canberra: Pacific Linguistics.
- Kristine A. Hildebrandt, D.N. Dhakal, Oliver Bond, Matt Vallejo and Andrea Fyffe. (2015). “A sociolinguistic survey of the languages of Manang, Nepal: Co-existence and endangerment.” NFDIN Journal, 14.6: 104–122.
- Pettigrew, Judith. (1999). "Parallel Landscapes: Ritual and Political Values of a Shamanic Soul Journey" in Himalayan Space: Cultural Horizons and Practices, edited by Balthasar Bickel and Martin Gaenszle, 247–271. Zürich: Völkerkundsmuseum
- Nishi 西, Yoshio 義郎 (1993c). "グルン語" [Gurung (=LSI), Gūrung; Gurungkura]. In 亀井 Kamei, 孝 Takashi; 河野 Kōno, 六郎 Rokurō; 千野 Chino, 栄一 Eichi (eds.). 三省堂言語学大辞典 The Sanseido Encyclopaedia of Linguistics (in Japanese). Vol. 5. Tokyo: 三省堂 Sanseido Press. pp. 135b–143b.
