= Manang language =

Sino-Tibetan language spoken in Nepal

Manang
- Nyishang
- [ŋyeɪˈʃɑŋ]
- Native to: Nepal
- Region: Manang District
- Ethnicity: Gurungs
- Native speakers: 390 (2011 census)
- Language family: Sino-Tibetan: Tamangic; Manang
- Dialects: Manang; Gyasumdo; Nar-Phu; Nyeshangte/'Nyishangba

Language codes
- ISO 639-3: nmm
- Glottolog: mana1288
- ELP: Manange

Manang, also called Manangba, Manange, Manang Ke, Nyishang, Nyishangte and Nyishangba, is a Sino-Tibetan language spoken in Nepal. Native speakers refer to the language as “ङिस्याङ” (devanagari) [ŋyeɪˈʃɑŋ], meaning 'our language'. Manang and its most closely related languages are often written as TGTM in literature, referring to Tamang, Gurung, Thakali, and Manangba, due to the high degree of similarity in the linguistic characteristics of the languages. The language is unwritten and almost solely spoken within the Manang District, leading it to be classified as threatened, with the number of speakers continuing to decline. Suspected reasons for the decline include parents not passing down the language to their children, in order to allow for what they see as more advanced communication with other groups of people, and thus gain more opportunities. Due to the proximity of the district to Tibet, as well as various globally widespread languages being introduced into the area, use of the native language is declining in favor of new languages, which are perceived to aid in the advancement of the people and region.

== Varieties ==
In the Manang Languages Project, Hildebrandt, et al. list four varieties of Manang.

- Manang
- Nar-Phu
- Gyasumdo
- Nyeshangte

== Classification ==
The classification system of the language often varies throughout the literature, and multiple terms are often used to describe the same language family. Although the existence of the Sino-Tibetan family is agreed upon, it is here that the breakdown can vary. In this, Sino-Tibetan (or Tibeto-Burman) is broken down into Northeastern India, Western, Southeastern, and Northeastern. The Western group further breaks down into Bodic and Himalayan, each of which has its own subgroups, with Western Bodish being one of the four Bodic subgroups.

== Phonology ==
=== Consonants ===
There are 29 consonants in Manange, which are summarized in the table below. The contrastive status of the consonants in parentheses is questionable, as they are rare idiosyncratic in distribution.

		Bilabial		Dental	Alveolar	Retroflex	Palatal	Velar		Glottal
		plain	labial	Dental	Alveolar	Retroflex	Palatal	plain	labial	Glottal
Nasal		m	mʷ		n		ɲ	ŋ	ŋʷ	
Plosive/ Affricate	unaspirated	p	pʷ	t̪	ts	ʈ	tʃ	k	kʷ	(ʔ)
Plosive/ Affricate	aspirated	pʰ	pʷʰ	t̪ʰ	tsʰ	ʈʰ	tʃʰ	kʰ	kʷʰ	
Fricative					s	ʂ	ʃ			h
Approximant					l		j		(w)	
Flap					ɾ					

As the table shows, voicing is not contrastive in Manange, although in word-medial position, consonants may be voiced intervocalically.

The retroflex stop in Manange occurs only in word-initial position, with one or two exceptions. The retroflex fricative /ʂ/ is subject to some inter-speaker variation, realized either as [ʂ] or as [ʃ] by different speakers. The retroflex is a commonly observed place of articulation in language of South Asia, but by having both a retroflex stop and fricative series, Manange represents a smaller sub-set of Tibeto-Burman languages, resembling languages like Purik, Ladakhi, Zanskari, Spiti, and a few non-Tibeto-Burman (Indo-Aryan) languages.

=== Vowels ===
There are six oral vowels and five nasalized vowels, which contrast with the oral vowels. Length is emergent and not phonemic.

	Front	Mid	Back
High	i ĩ		u ũ
Mid	e ẽ	ɜ	o õ
Low			ɑ ɑ̃

=== Tone ===
There are four distinct tones in the TGTM sub-family, each of which differs by the overall pitch, as well as how breathy the sound is. Using a rating of 1 to 5, which correlates to low to high pitch respectively, the beginning and ending sound of every monosyllabic Manang word can be rated in order to determine whether the speaker increases or decreases the pitch, as well as breathiness. Of the four tones, the first stays consistently mid-level throughout the entire word, whereas the second tonal type starts at a 4 and increases in pitch to a 5. The third and fourth types decrease from the start to finish of the word, although tone-3 is higher pitched overall. The four tone classification is used for every related language, although the exact pitch levels can vary between them. For example, tone-3 in Manang is high pitched and clear, as discussed above, while tone-3 of Gurung is low and breathy. Essentially, every one of these languages has four potential tones in their words, but the exact pitch and clarity of each varies between languages. Words can have the same basic pronunciation, with the only difference being the pitch, making it possible to misinterpret words that have drastically different meanings. It is believed that a two toned system may have created the original makeup of these languages, although the original tones used are still unclear.

=== Syllables ===
The structure of syllables is represented as (C1)(C2)V(C3), with C1-3 corresponding to three consonants, and the V representing the vowel. Native speakers tend to agree that the most emphasis is placed on the first syllable of a word. Vowels present in the first syllable of words are held slightly longer than if located later in the word. However, from the minimal field research carried out, there is often not a distinguishable difference between syllable emphasis, and exceptions are also present. Terms that are exceptions often show stress on the last syllable, have vowels held longer on the second syllable, or both. Examples of exceptions include the Manang words for 'enemy', 'insect', 'forehead', 'button', 'graveyard', and 'leg'.

== Lexicon ==
The Manange lexicon is composed largely of words that are clearly of Tibeto-Burman/Sino-Tibetan origin, as found in the glossaries published by Hildebrandt (2004), Hoshi and Nagano. However, due to more recent contact with Indo-European languages (primarily Nepali), some areas of the Manange lexicon have either been replaced with Indic (or English) forms, or else there is observed lexical switching between Manange and Indic forms in everyday Manange discourse.

Hildebrandt reports that of a Loanword Typology Meaning database (found in Haspelamth and Tadmor) of 1,127 word-forms, 133 show varying degrees of evidence for loanword status. This amounts to just under 12% of the lexicon, based on that database. However, Hildebrandt notes that loanwords are not used equally by all segments of the Manange-speaking population, and that there is a noticeable split between the vocabulary found in the daily use of Mananges who were born and raised in Nepali-speaking areas such as Kathmandu versus those born and raised in traditional Manange-speaking villages and towns in Manang District. Hildebrandt also notes that within-family borrowing is also likely, but is harder to determine because of extreme lexical similarity across Tibetic languages of the region.

Loanwords in Manange are primarily nouns, including semantic categories of clothing, food, and concepts that encode the modern world.

Manange Form	Loaned Form	Meaning
kotʃẽ	ʃilik, ɾeʃʌm	'silk'
ʂi	ɾil	'cotton'
tʌuli	tauli	'towel'
sʌpi	sop~sʌbun	'soap'
--	pʰon	'telephone'
--	ɾel	'train'

Some loan blends (blended native and loaned materials) include ^{4}tʰa ^{1}suŋkuɾ 'pig', (^{2}naka) ^{4}pʰale 'rooster/cock', and kʰapʌɾ ^{4}tʃʰe 'newspaper'.

Loaned verbs in Manange incorporate a "dummy affix" ti, and then carry the full range of aspect and modality morphology.

Form	Meaning
tiɾ ^{2}ti	'pay'
^{1}sʌɾʌp ^{1}lʌ	'curse'
kelai ^{2}ti	'thresh'
ɾok ^{2}ti	'forbid, refuse'

Manange has two classes of adjectives: verb-like adjectives and true adjectives (a smaller class), which do not host verbal morphology, but rather are morpho-syntactically distinct. There are very few observed loaned adjectives in Manange, but those that are observed are part of the true adjectives class, such as ^{3}tsok'straight.'

== Nouns ==
Nouns are the largest and most productive word class in the language. Nouns may take a definite enclitic ko, an indefinite enclitic ri, a plural enclitic tse, and may host case markers.

^{22}njukju=tse	‘dogs’
^{22}kola=tse	‘children’
^{52}ʂo=tse	‘friends’
^{22}juŋpɜ=tse	‘rocks’

The plural enclitic may occur with both animate and inanimate nouns. However, when numerals are overtly present, plural marking is optional.

Nouns do not identify gender, or whether something is inanimate or alive. Rather, there are completely separate words to identify men from women, and girls from boys. The most common way of making nouns plural is by adding tse to the end. As with English, there are some exceptions, and the entire form of the word may change rather than having an ending attached. The structure of compound nouns varies. One interesting compound structural type is where the leftmost word gives additional meaning to the word on the right. For example, the word phémwi meaning 'coin', breaks down into phe meaning 'metal' and mwi meaning 'money'. The money is being described as metallic, making it known that the currency is in coin form rather than a paper bill.

Like other related languages, Manange displays a sizable set of post-nominal locator nouns, that may or may not be followed by the locational enclitic ri~re. These nouns encode a wide range of topological relations, and the linguistic frame of reference system encoded in these forms is primarily relative (i.e. oriented on the speaker's own viewing perspective). Some of these locator nouns are listed here:

^{52}naŋ	‘inside’
^{22}pɜri	‘between’
^{22}ŋwontse	‘front’
^{44}kaŋro	‘upward’
^{44}litse	‘behind’
^{22}ti	‘nearby’
^{22}tor ~ ^{22}ja ^{22}tortse	‘left ~ left hand’
^{22}kje ~^{22}ja ^{22}kjetse	‘right ~ right hand’
^{52}tʃaŋ	‘north’
^{42}lo	‘south’
^{44}ʃer	‘east’
^{52}nu	‘west’

=== Proper Nouns ===
The set of proper nouns in Manange includes people's names, place names, names of deities, and names of the week or months, for example. These are not marked for plural, they do not take determiners, but they can be marked for case.

=== Pronouns ===
Pronouns include personal pronouns and interrogative pronouns. The first person plural pronoun shows an inclusive/exclusive distinction, while the third person pronouns do not show animacy or gender distinctions. Interrogative pronouns are used to form questions. Some of these are a single lexical item, and others are compounds or collocated word-forms.

		Singular	Plural
1st person	exclusive	^{1}ŋɜ	^{1}ŋi
1st person	inclusive	^{1}ŋɜ	^{1}ŋjaŋ
2nd person		^{3}kjɜ	^{1}kimi
3rd Person		^{1}k^{h}i	^{1}k^{h}imi
Reflexive		^{4}raŋ	

^{1}ta	'what'
^{2}hani	‘where’
^{2}su	'who'
^{2}hatsu	‘how (manner)’
^{2}hacuŋ	‘how (state)’
^{2}hajuŋ	'when'
^{2}phuŋ kɜti	‘how many’
^{1}ta ^{3}pitse	'why'

== Status ==
The status of this language is currently rated as a 6b according to the Ethnologue rating system, classifying it as threatened. While the language is able to be spoken by older generations, and continuing to be passed onto newer ones, the rate at which it is being taught is sharply declining. The Nepalese Revolution of 1990 allowed for more freedom of languages, so identifying with a native ancestral language was of great importance to many. In reality however, fewer people actually spoke the languages they claimed to, leading to exaggerated speaker numbers being listed. Despite the relatively small number of speakers, allowing the language to die out entirely will be detrimental to the world as a whole. Even the least spoken languages hold stories, traditions, and potentially useful knowledge of the world, which will be lost if the language is gone. The endangered status of Manang means that researchers should attempt to collect as much detailed documentation and audio recordings now, before the language is potentially lost.

== Bibliography ==
- Carol Genetti (2008). "Syntactic Aspects of Nominalization in Five Tibeto-Burman Languages of the Himalayan Area". Linguistics of the Tibeto-Burman Area, 31: 97–143.
- Kristine A. Hildebrandt (2005). "A Phonetic Analysis of Manange Segmental and Suprasegmental Properties". Linguistics of the Tibeto-Burman Area, 28:1-36.
- Michael Muhlich (1997). "Credit Relations in Nepal: A Preliminary Report on the Khatsara and Manange Kidu Systems". Nepalese Studies, 24: 201–215.
- Michael Noonan (2007). "Nominalizers in Tamangic Languages". Presented at the International Workshop on Nominalizers and Copulas in East Asian and Neighboring Languages, Hong Kong, China, January.
- Stan Mumford (1989). Himalayan Dialogue: Tibetan Lamas and Gurung Shamans In Nepal. Madison: The University of Wisconsin Press.
- Nareshwar Jang Gurung. 1976. "An Introduction to the Socio-Economic Structure of Manang District", Kailash. 4: 295–308.
- Nishi 西, Yoshio 義郎 (1992f). "マナン語" [Manang]. In 亀井 Kamei, 孝 Takashi; 河野 Kōno, 六郎 Rokurō; 千野 Chino, 栄一 Eichi (eds.). 三省堂言語学大辞典 The Sanseido Encyclopaedia of Linguistics (in Japanese). Vol. 4. Tokyo: 三省堂 Sanseido Press. pp. 103b–111a. ISBN 4385152128.
- Kristine A. Hildebrandt, D.N. Dhakal, Oliver Bond, Matt Vallejo and Andrea Fyffe. (2015). “A sociolinguistic survey of the languages of Manang, Nepal: Co-existence and endangerment.” NFDIN Journal, 14.6: 104–122.
- Kristine A. Hildebrandt (2004). "A Grammar and Dictionary of the Manange Language" in Tibeto-Burman Languages of Nepal: Manange and Sherpa, edited by Carol Genetti. 2–189. Canberra: Pacific Linguistics.
- Kristine A. Hildebrandt (2013). “Manange (South Asia): A Language Sketch” in How Languages Work, edited by Carol Genetti, 404–423. U.K.: Cambridge University Press.
- Kristine A. Hildebrandt (2009). “Loanwords in Manange, a Tibeto-Burman language of Nepal” in Loanwords in the World's Languages, edited by Martin Haspelmath and Uri Tadmor, 447–470. Berlin: Mouton de Gruyter.
- Kristine A. Hildebrandt (2007). “Tone in Tibeto-Burman Languages: Typological and sociolinguistic Approaches” in New Trends in Typology: Young Typologists’ Contributions to Linguistic Theory, edited by Matti Miestamo and Bernhard Wälchli, 67–90. Berlin: Mouton de Gruyter.
- Kristine A. Hildebrandt (2007). “Manange” in Grammatical Borrowing in Cross-linguistic Perspective, edited by Yaron Matras and Jeanette Sakel, 283–300. Berlin: Mouton de Gruyter.
- Carol Genetti and Kristine A. Hildebrandt (2004). “The Two Adjective Classes in Manange” in Adjective Classes, edited by R.M.W. Dixon and A. Y. Aikhenvald, 74–96. Oxford University Press.
