= Thakali =

Thakali may refer to:

- Thakali people, a people of Nepal
- Thakali language, their Sino-Tibetan language
