= Gurung Khema (Unicode block) =

- Range: U+16100..U+1613F (64 code points)
- Plane: SMP
- Scripts: Gurung Khema
- Assigned: 58 code points
- Unused: 6 reserved code points

Unicode version history
- 16.0 (2024): 58 (+58)

Unicode documentation
- Code chart ∣ Web page

Gurung Khema is a Unicode block containing characters used to write the Gurung language.

Gurung Khema^{[1]}^{[2]} Official Unicode Consortium code chart (PDF)
	0	1	2	3	4	5	6	7	8	9	A	B	C	D	E	F
U+1610x	𖄀	𖄁	𖄂	𖄃	𖄄	𖄅	𖄆	𖄇	𖄈	𖄉	𖄊	𖄋	𖄌	𖄍	𖄎	𖄏
U+1611x	𖄐	𖄑	𖄒	𖄓	𖄔	𖄕	𖄖	𖄗	𖄘	𖄙	𖄚	𖄛	𖄜	𖄝	𖄞	𖄟
U+1612x	𖄠	𖄡	𖄢	𖄣	𖄤	𖄥	𖄦	𖄧	𖄨	𖄩	𖄪	𖄫	𖄬	𖄭	𖄮	𖄯
U+1613x	𖄰	𖄱	𖄲	𖄳	𖄴	𖄵	𖄶	𖄷	𖄸	𖄹						
Notes: 1. As of Unicode version 16.0; 2. Grey areas indicate non-assigned code points

== History ==
The following Unicode-related documents record the purpose and process of defining specific characters in the Gurung Khema block:

Version	Final code points (Note: Proposed code points and characters names may differ from final code points and names)	Count	L2 ID	WG2 ID	Document
16.0	U+16100..16139	58	L2/11-047		Gurung, Man Bahadur (2010-08-08), Submission of GURUNG SCRIPT
16.0	U+16100..16139	58	L2/11-106	N4019	Pandey, Anshuman (2011-04-13), Introducing the Khema Script for Writing Gurung
16.0	U+16100..16139	58	L2/11-139		Anderson, Deborah; McGowan, Rick; Whistler, Ken (2011-04-27), "4. Khema", Review of Indic-related L2 documents and Recommendations to the UTC
16.0	U+16100..16139	58	L2/21-145		Mandal, Biswajit (2021-07-14), Proposal to Encode the Gurung Khema
16.0	U+16100..16139	58	L2/21-130		Anderson, Deborah; Whistler, Ken; Pournader, Roozbeh; Liang, Hai (2021-07-26), "8 Gurung Khema", Recommendations to UTC #168 July 2021 on Script Proposals
16.0	U+16100..16139	58	L2/22-096		Mandal, Biswajit (2022-03-11), Proposal to Encode the Gurung Khema
16.0	U+16100..16139	58	L2/22-068		Anderson, Deborah; Whistler, Ken; Pournader, Roozbeh; Constable, Peter (2022-04-15), "5 Gurung Khema", Recommendations to UTC #171 April 2022 on Script Proposals
16.0	U+16100..16139	58	L2/22-132		Silva, Eduardo Marín (2022-05-25), On the encoding model of the Gurung Khema script
16.0	U+16100..16139	58	L2/22-157		Mandal, Biswajit (2022-06-05), Proposal to Encode the Gurung Khema
16.0	U+16100..16139	58	L2/22-128		Anderson, Deborah; Whistler, Ken; Pournader, Roozbeh; Constable, Peter (2022-07-20), "5 Gurung Khema", Recommendations to UTC #172 July 2022 on Script Proposals
16.0	U+16100..16139	58	L2/22-121		Constable, Peter (2022-08-01), "Motion 172-M1", Draft Minutes of UTC Meeting 172, "UTC accepts 58 Gurung Khema characters"
