= Tamangic languages =

Sino-Tibetan branch of central-eastern Nepal

Tamangic
- Geographic distribution: Nepal, India (Sikkim)
- Linguistic classification: Sino-Tibetan: Tibeto-Burman; Tibeto-Kanauri ?; Bodish; Tamangic
- Subdivisions: Tamangic proper ("TGTM"); Ghale; Kaike

Language codes
- Glottolog: kaik1248
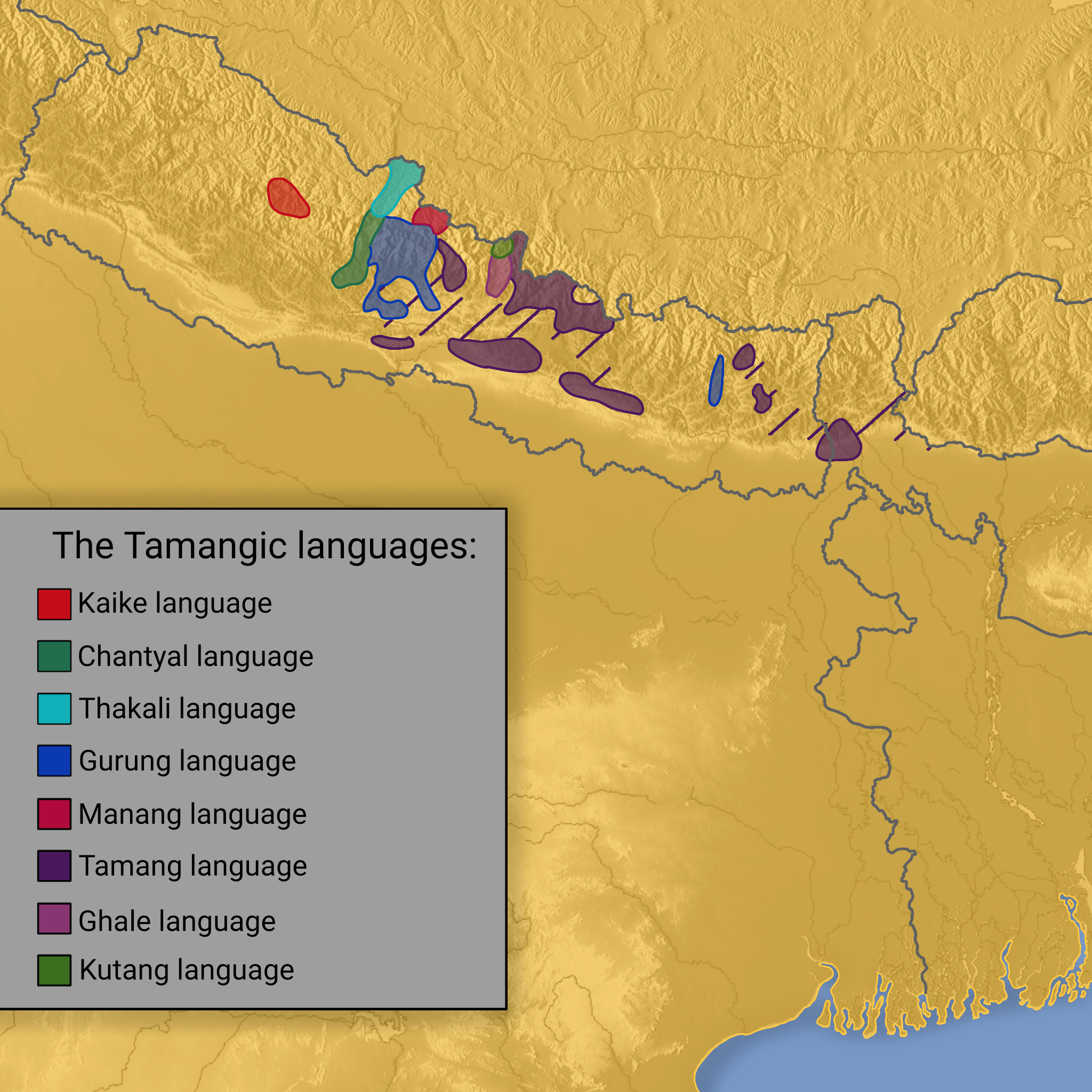

The Tamangic languages, TGTM languages, or West Bodish languages or Kaike-Ghale-Tamangic languages (Glottolog), are a family of Sino-Tibetan languages spoken in the Himalayas of Nepal. They are called "West Bodish" by Bradley (1997), from Bod, the native term for Tibet. TGTM stands for Tamang-Gurung-Thakali-Manang.

Proto-TGTM has been reconstructed in Mazaudon (1994). Tamangic is united with the Bodish and West Himalayish languages in Bradley's (1997) "Bodish" and Van Driem's (2001) Tibeto-Kanauri.

== Languages ==
The Tamangic languages are:

- Tamang (several divergent varieties, with a million speakers)
- Gurung (two varieties with low mutual intelligibility)
- Thakali (including the Seke dialect; ethnically Tamang)
- Manang language cluster: the closely related Manang, Gyasumdo, Nar Phu, and Nyeshangte languages.
- Chantyal
- Ghale languages (Ghale and Kutang): spoken by ethnic Tamang, perhaps related to Tamangic.
- Kaike (moribund): may be the most divergent.
