= Chhusang =

Chhusang छुसाङ
- Village development committee
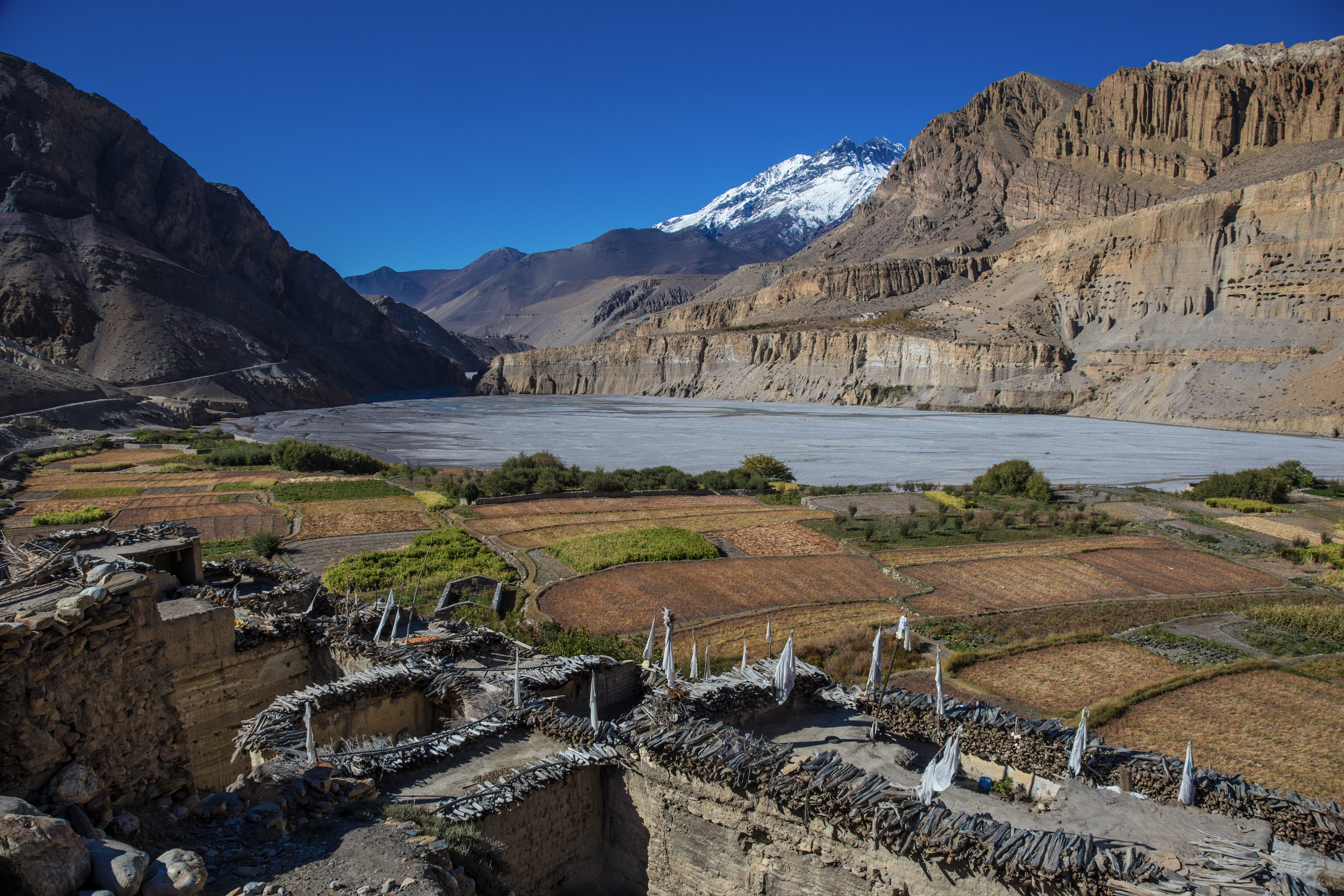
- Chhusang in the Kali Gandaki Gorge

- Location in Nepal Chhusang (Nepal)
- Coordinates: 28°55′48″N 83°54′36″E
- Country: Nepal
- Zone: Dhawalagiri Zone
- District: Mustang District
- Elevation: 2,980 m (9,780 ft)

Population (1991)
  - Total: 860
- Time zone: UTC+5:45 (Nepal Time)

Chhusang (Thsug in Tibetan) is a village development committee in Mustang District in the Dhawalagiri Zone of northern Nepal. It is located on the Upper Mustang trekking route, between Tangbe and Chele, about an hour's walk north of Tangbe. It lies at the junction of the Narshing river and the Kali Gandaki.

It is surrounded by gigantic red, orange and silver gray cliffs spotted with cave dwellings. The village consists of three different hamlets: north of the Narshing river is Tangma, to the south of it is Braga, and west of Braga, towards the Kali Gandaki, is Cikyab. It is an active farming community.

== Demography ==
At the time of the 1991 Nepal census it had a population of 860 people living in 195 individual households.

== Religion and culture ==
In the high cliffs on the west side of the Kali Gandhi river, is an extensive area of caves called Thagsing Grangma. To the south of these is an abandoned nunnery called Gompa Gang, the “Convent Ridge”.

== Galleries ==
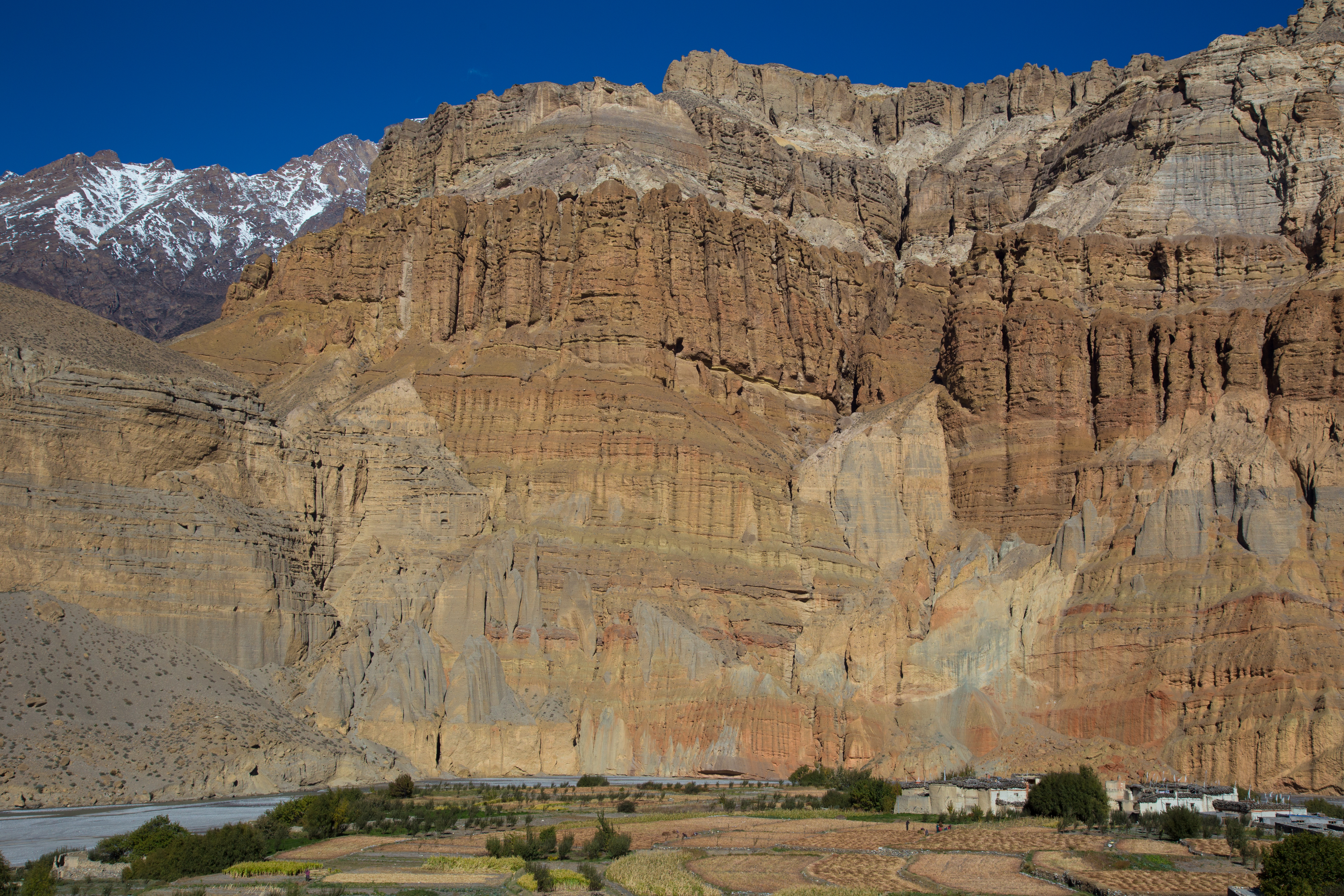
Chhusang cliffs.

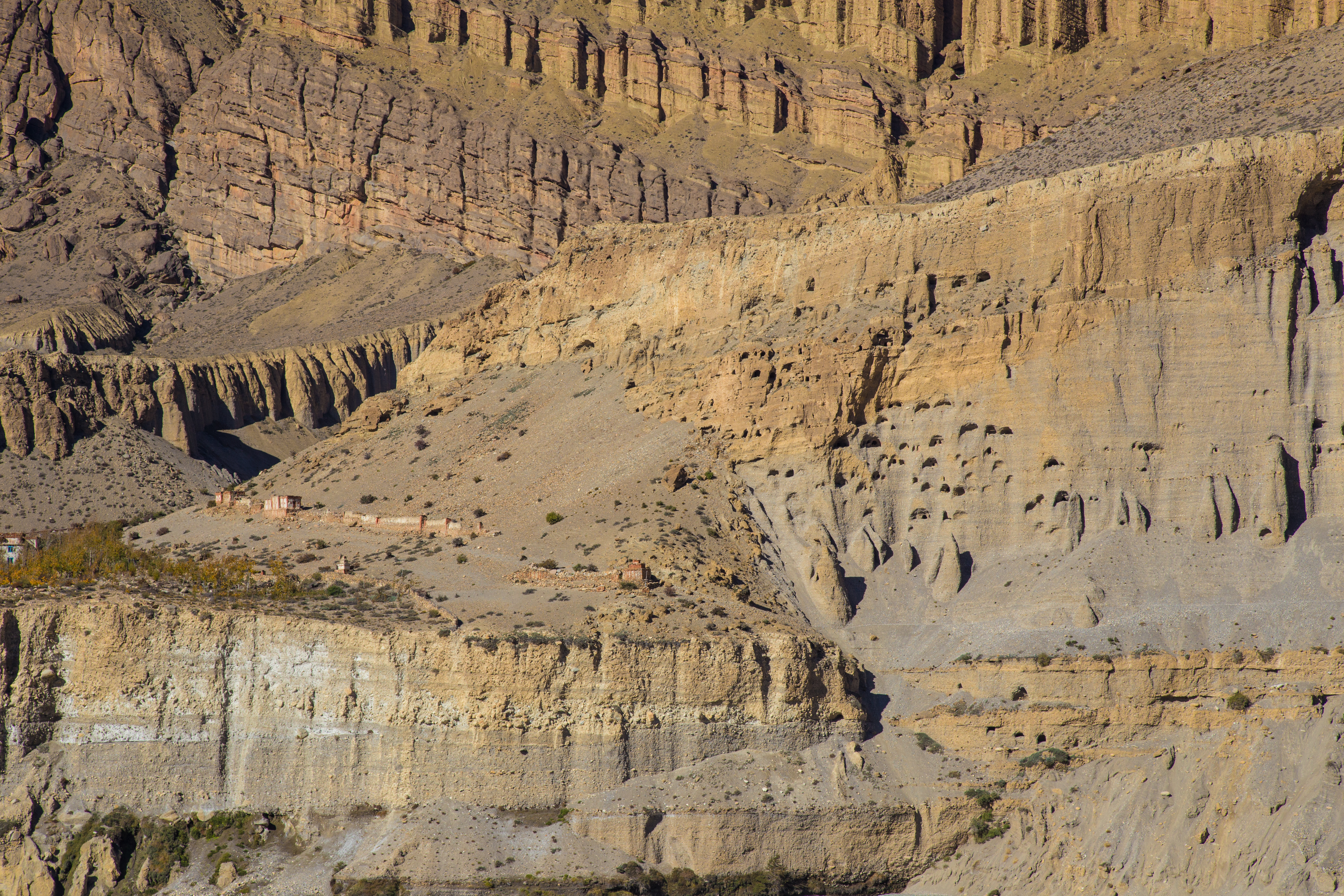
Cave dwellings in the cliffs of Chhusang.

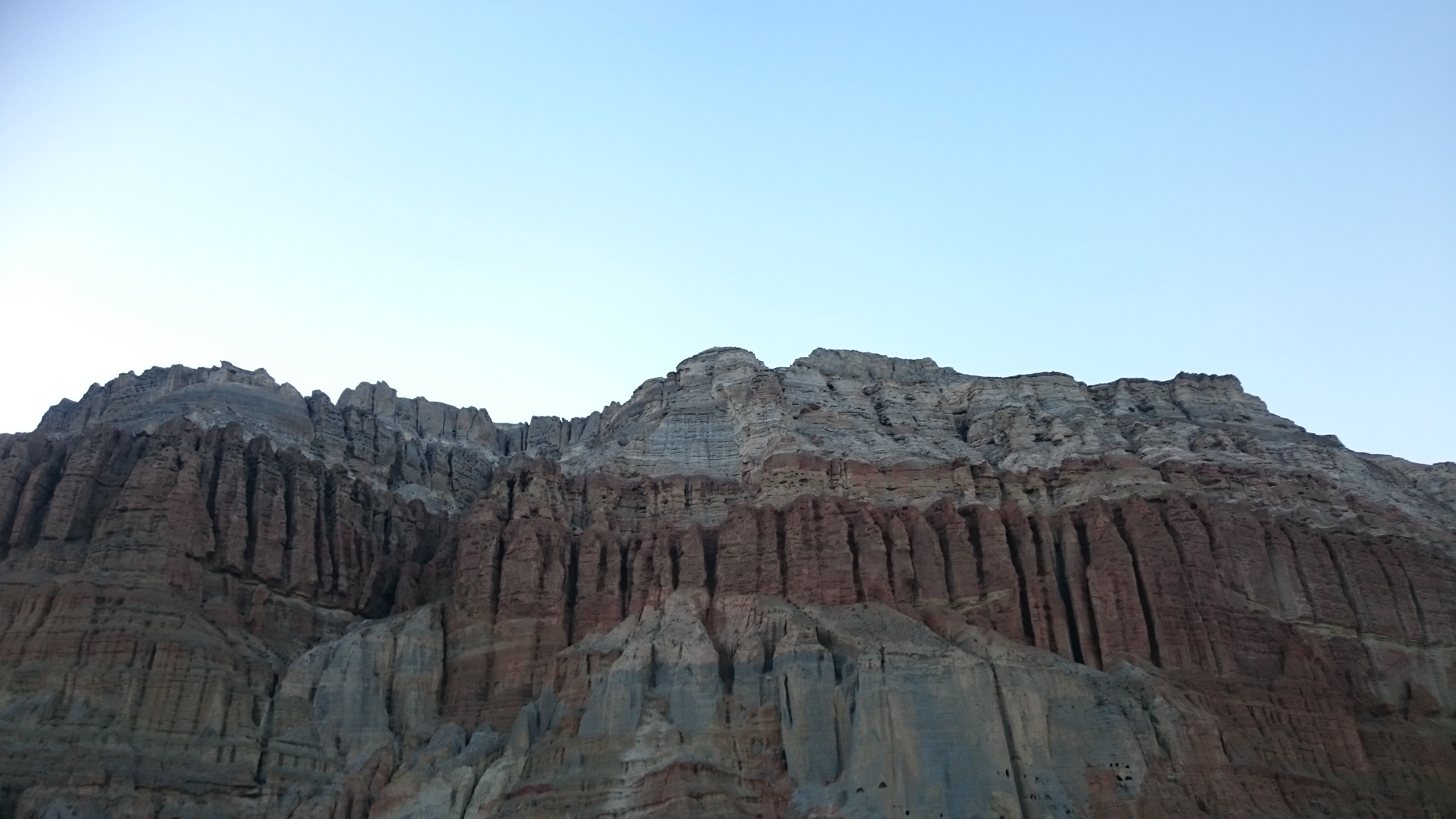
Natural caves at Chhusang.

Villages of VDC Chhusang

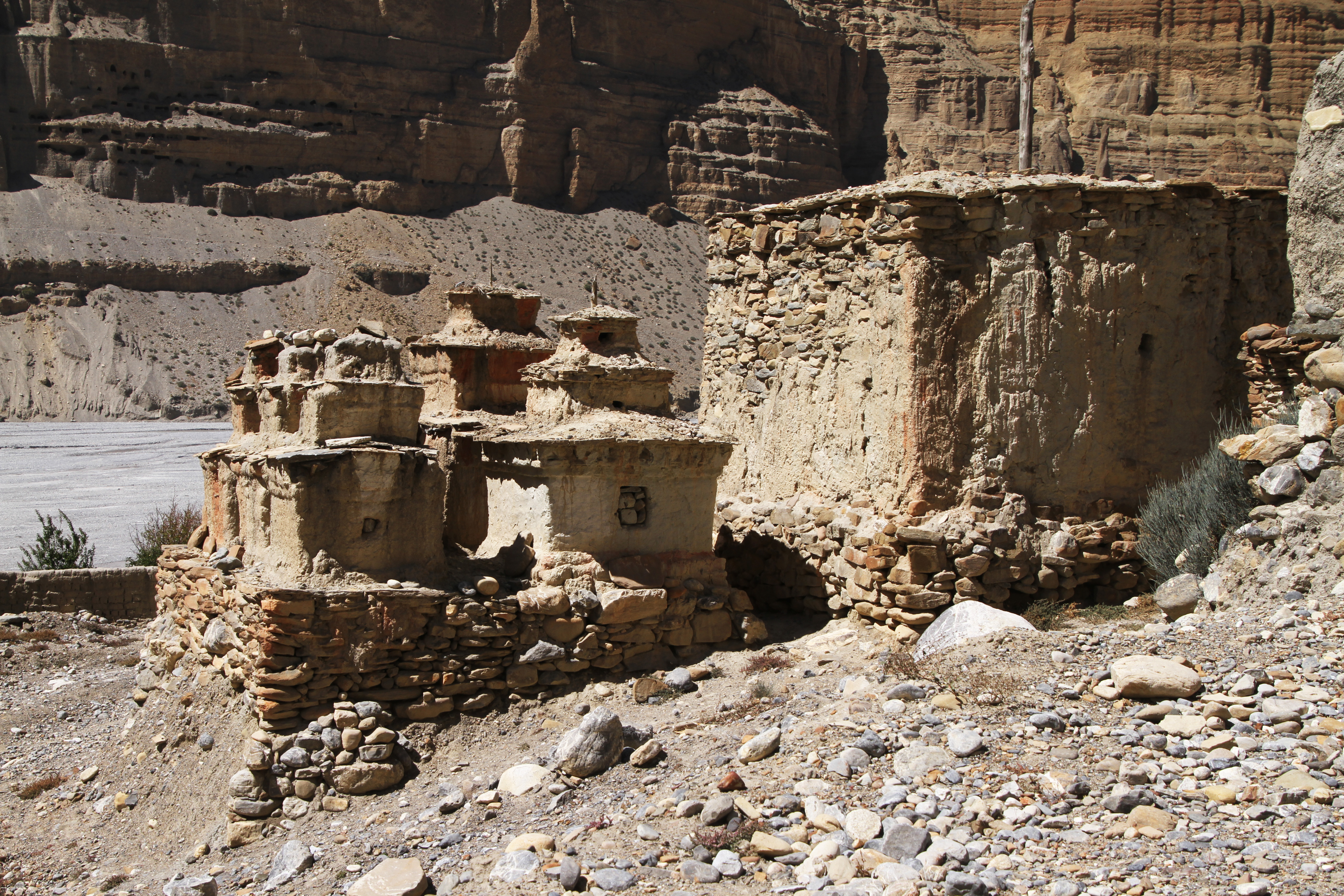
Chhusang

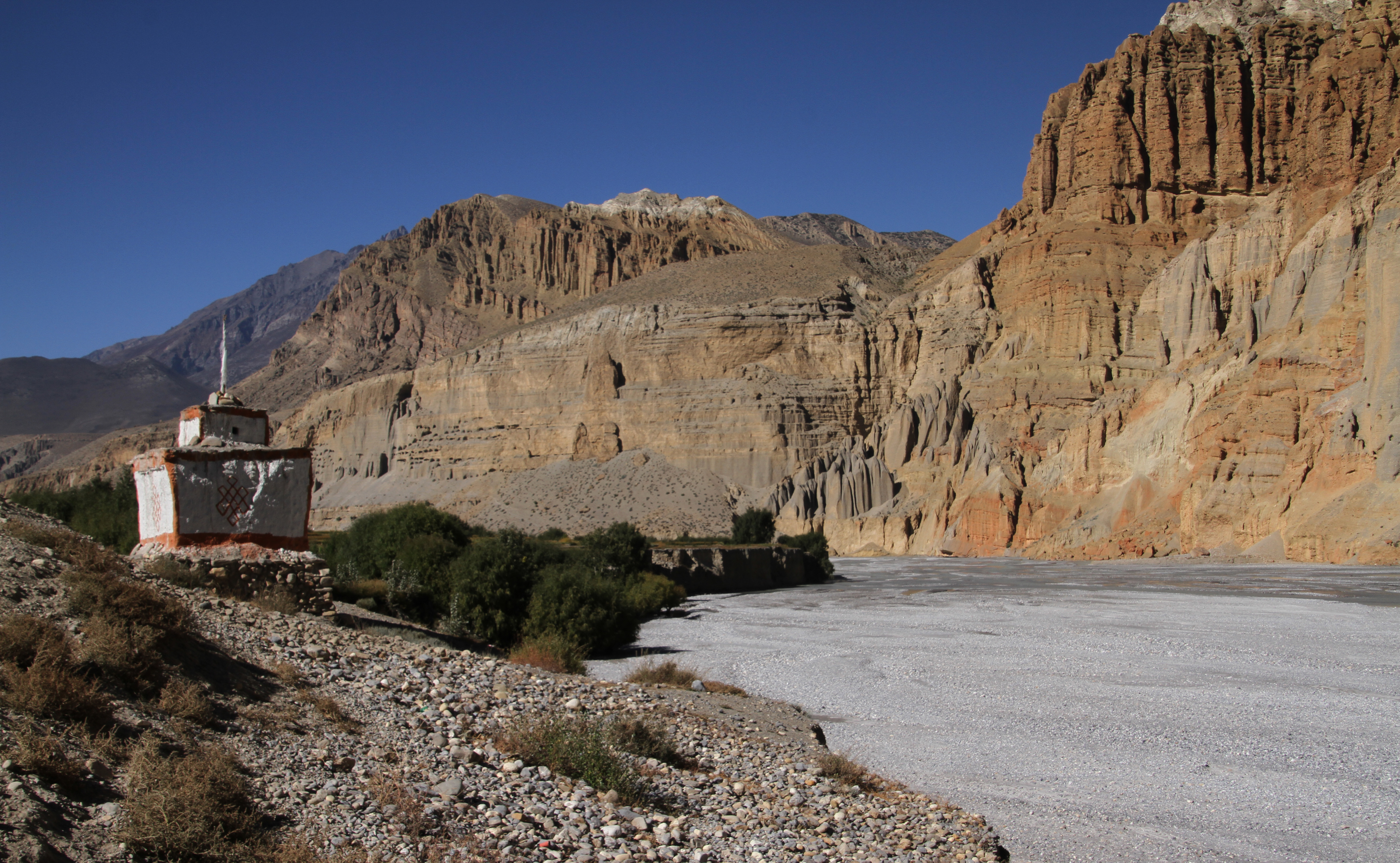
Kali Gandaki between Chhusang and Chele

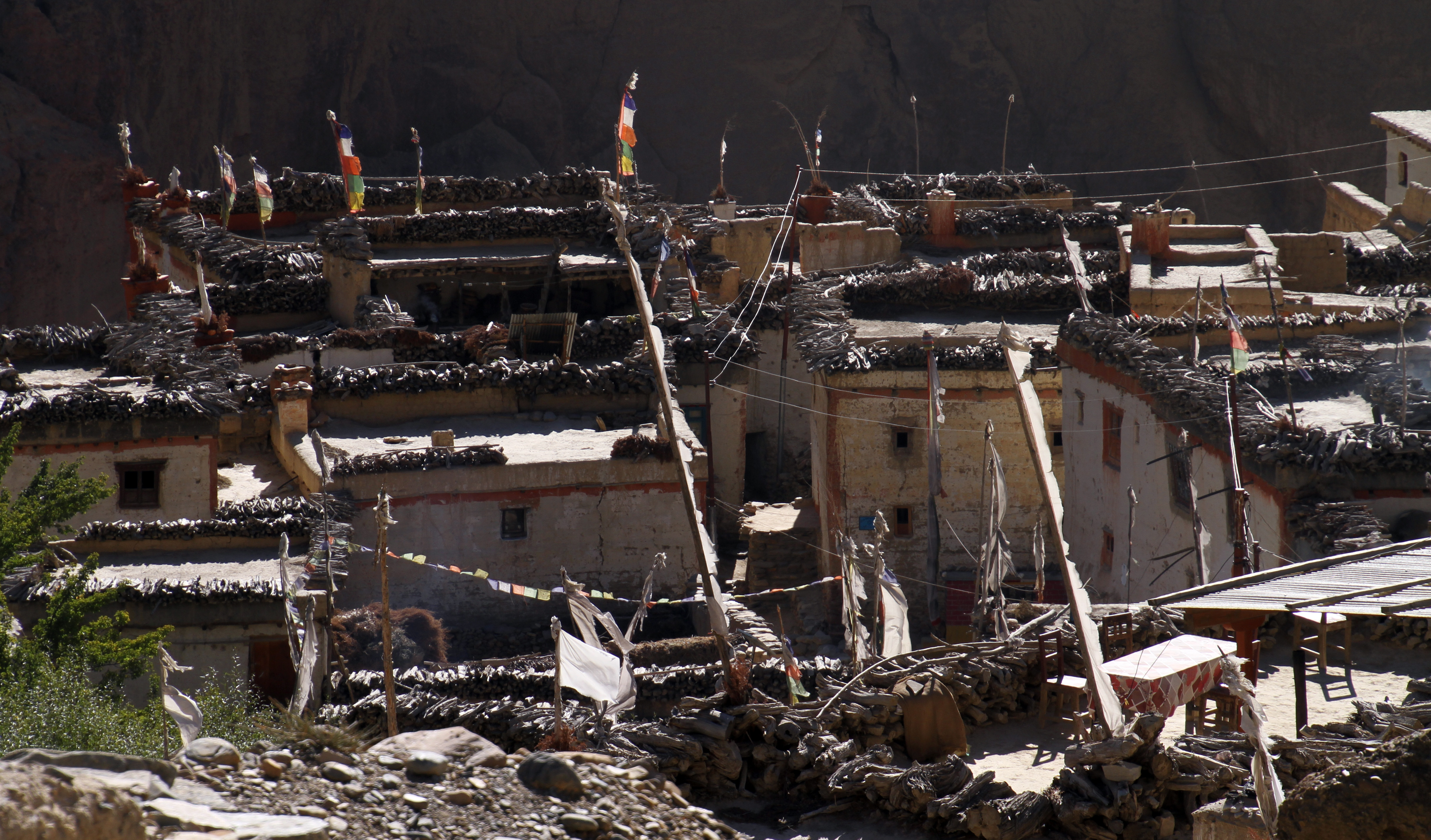
Chele

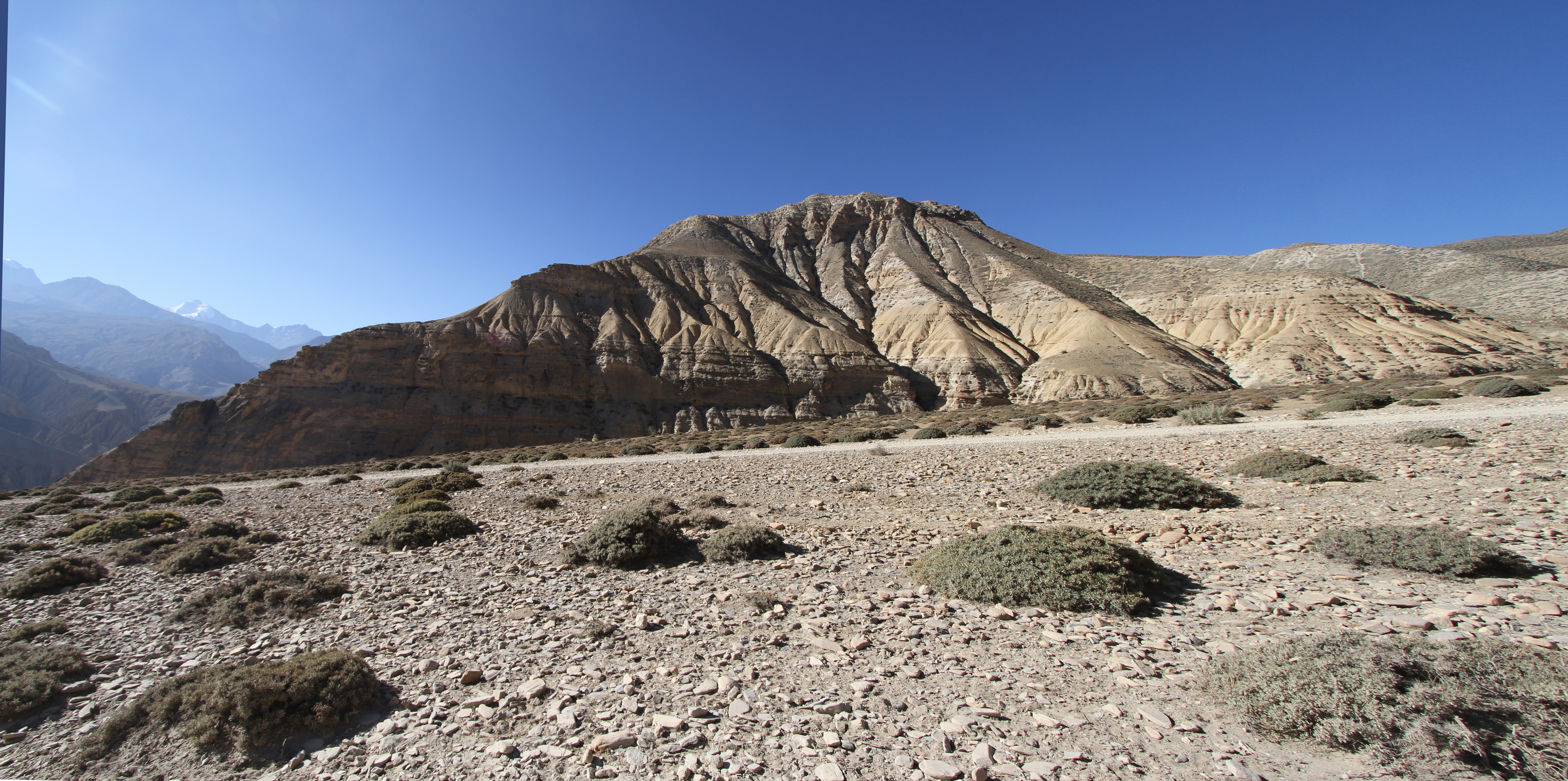
From Chele to Samar

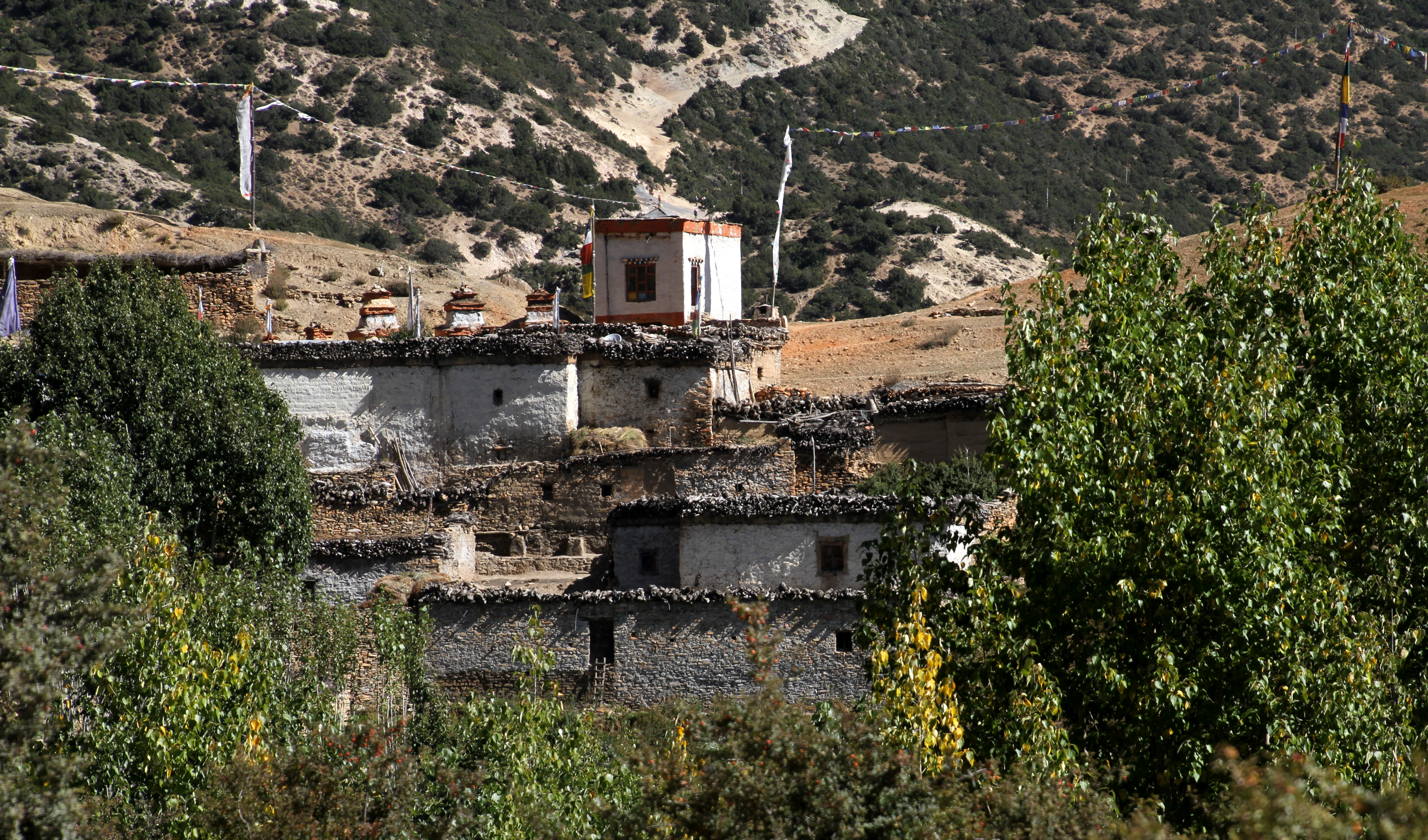
Samar

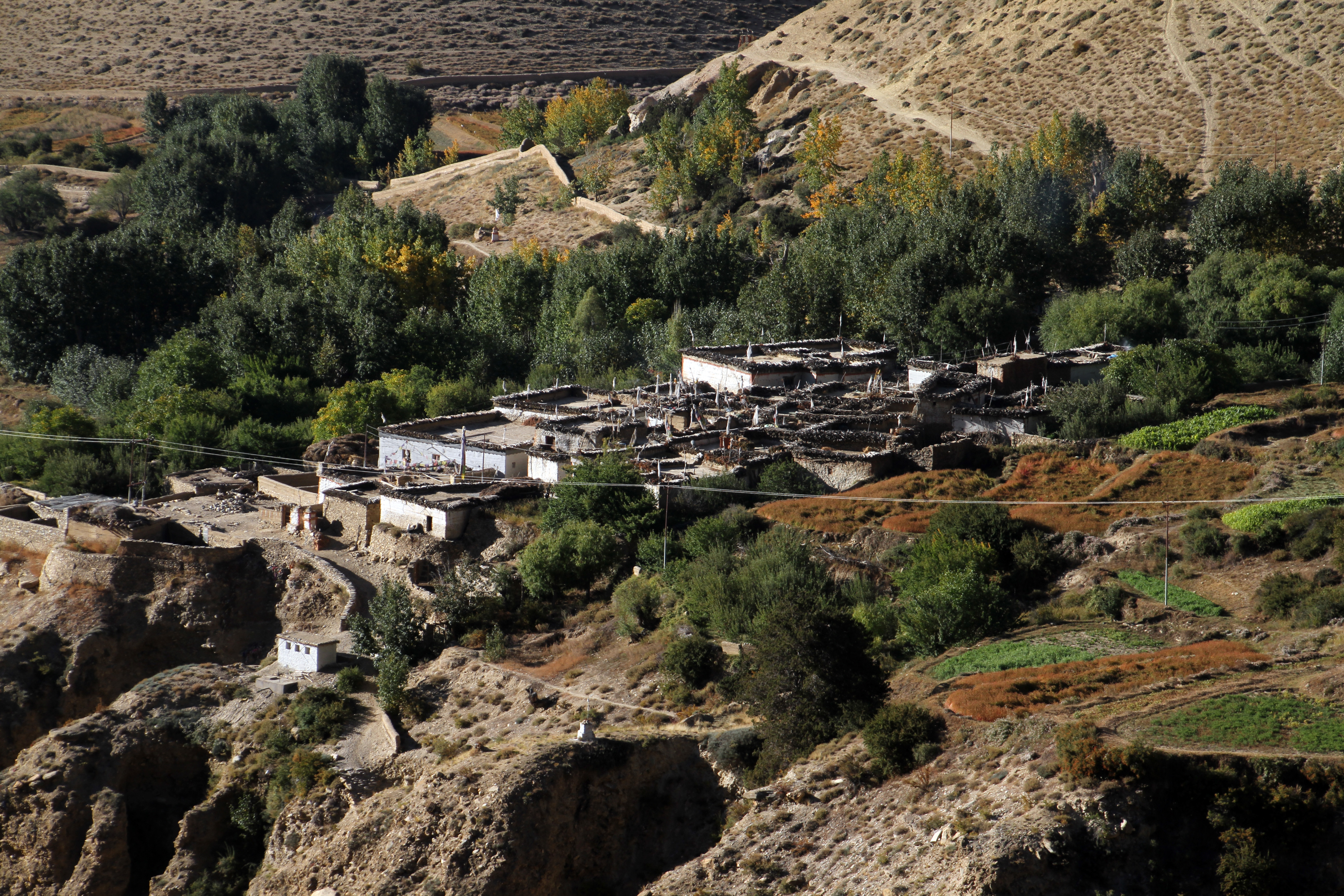
Ghyakar

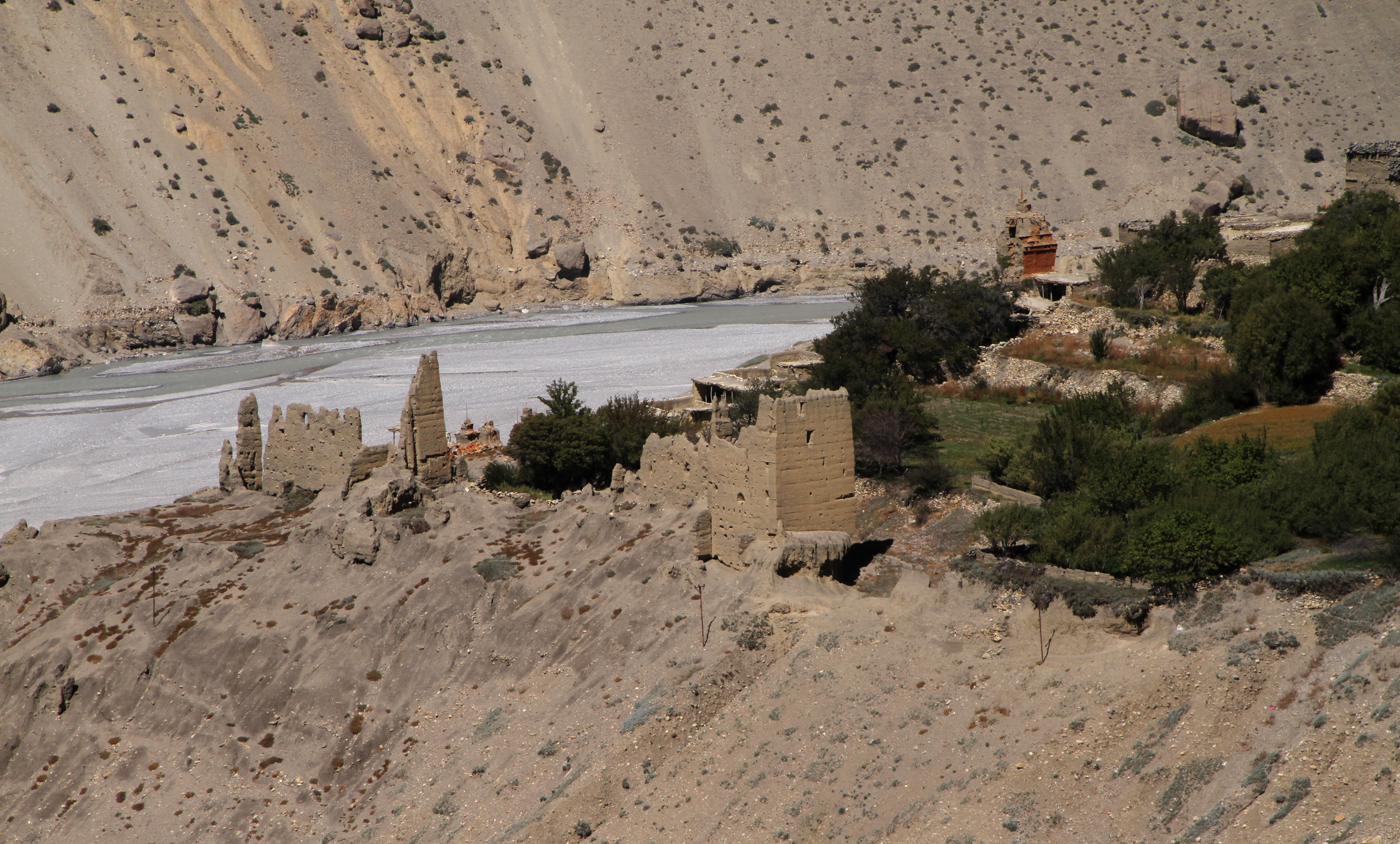
Tangbe
