= Ghale languages =

Sino-Tibetian dialect in Nepal

Ghale
- Geographic distribution: Nepal
- Linguistic classification: Sino-Tibetan: Tibeto-Kanauri ?; Tamangic ?; Ghale
- Subdivisions: Kutang; Ghale

Language codes
- ISO 639-3: –
- Glottolog: ghal1246

Ghale is a Sino-Tibetan dialect cluster of Nepal that may be part of the Tamangic family. The people who speak them are ethnically Tamang, but their languages are too poorly known to be sure. The two languages, Kutang (Bihi, Chak, Rana) and Ghale (Barpak, Kyaura, Laprak, Khorla, Uiya, Jagat, Philim, Nyak), might each be considered more than one language.
