= Khema script =

Abugida script

Khema
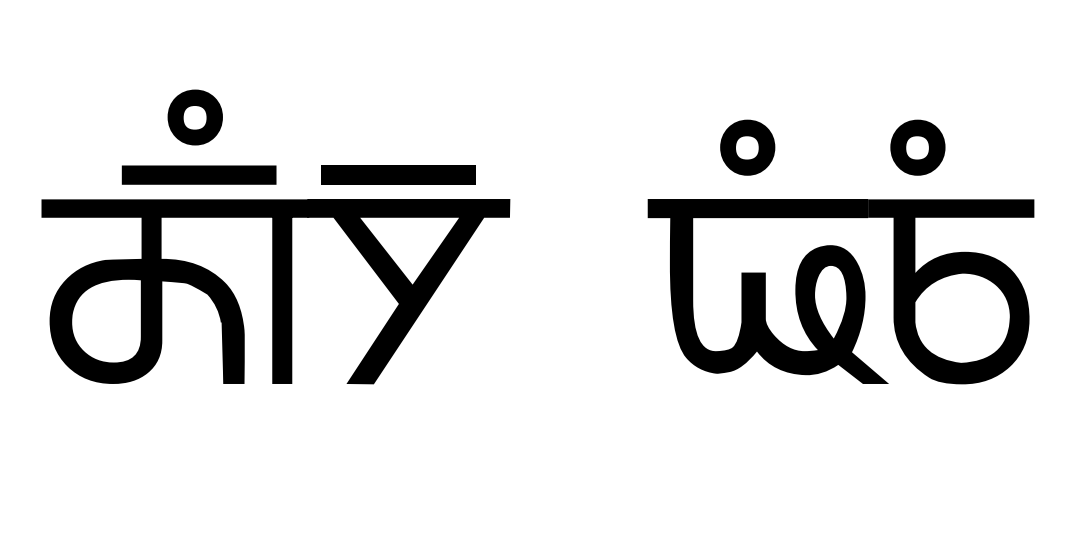
- Khema Lipi
- Script type: Abugida
- Direction: Left-to-right
- Languages: Gurung

Related scripts
- Parent systems: Egyptian: Proto-Sinaitic; Phoenician; Aramaic; Brahmi; Gupta; Tibetan; Khema
- Sister systems: Meitei, Lepcha, Phagspa, Marchen

ISO 15924
- ISO 15924: Gukh (397), Gurung Khema

Unicode
- Unicode alias: Gurung Khema
- Unicode range: U+16100–U+1613F
- The theorised Semitic origins of the Brahmi script are not universally agreed upon.

The Khema script, also known as Gurung Khema, Khema Phri, Khema Lipi, is used to write the Gurung language. The Language Commission of Nepal recognizes Khema as the official script of Gurung.

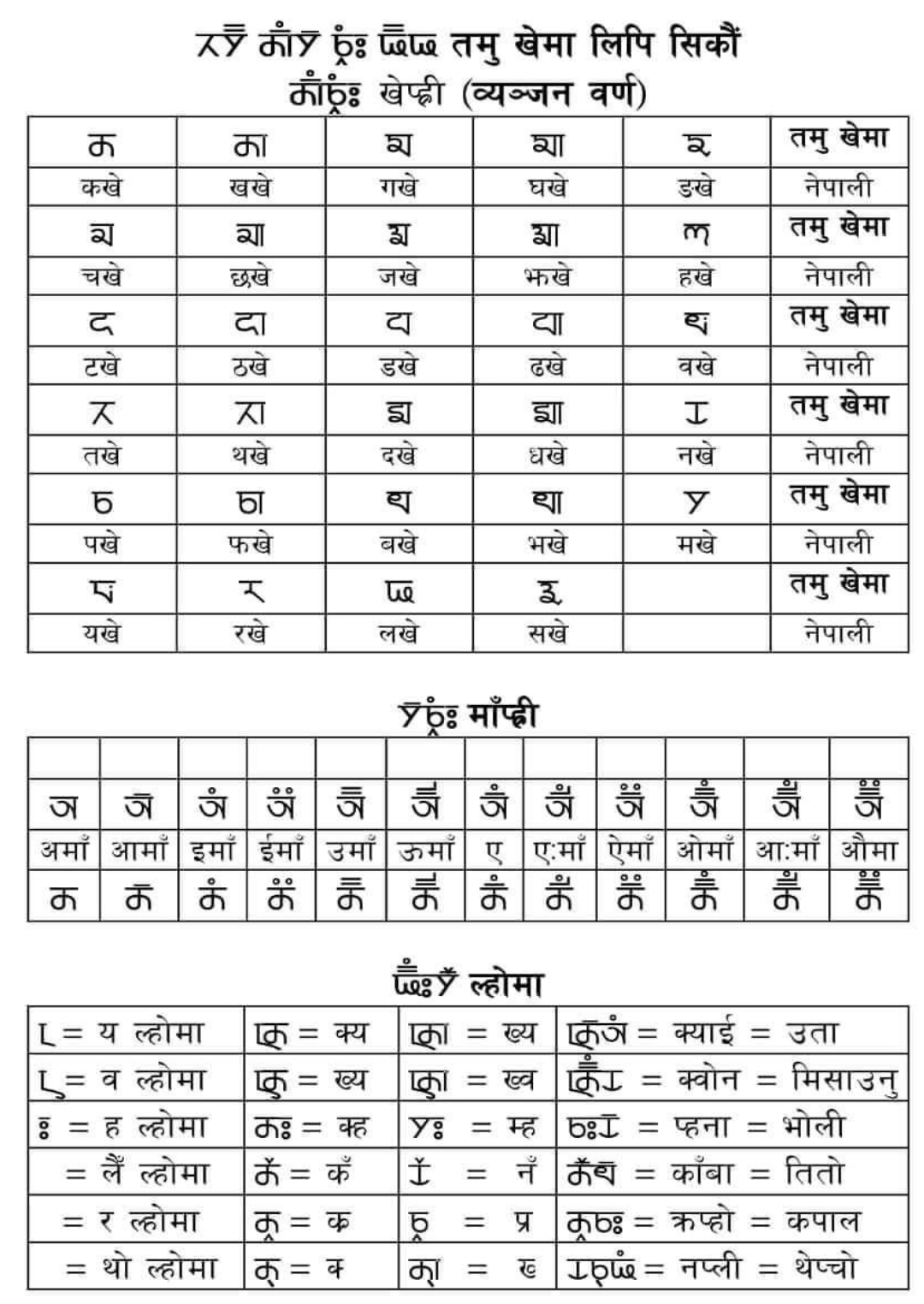
Khema Lipi full chart

== Usage ==
Devdaha Mother Tongues Academy, located in Rupandehi, teaches Gurung in the Khema script. The Khema script is used in Sikkim to officially write the Gurung language.

== Unicode ==
The Khema script was added to the Unicode Standard in September, 2024 with the release of version 16.0.

The Unicode block for Khema, called Gurung Khema, is U+16100–U+1613F:

Gurung Khema^{[1]}^{[2]} Official Unicode Consortium code chart (PDF)
	0	1	2	3	4	5	6	7	8	9	A	B	C	D	E	F
U+1610x	𖄀	𖄁	𖄂	𖄃	𖄄	𖄅	𖄆	𖄇	𖄈	𖄉	𖄊	𖄋	𖄌	𖄍	𖄎	𖄏
U+1611x	𖄐	𖄑	𖄒	𖄓	𖄔	𖄕	𖄖	𖄗	𖄘	𖄙	𖄚	𖄛	𖄜	𖄝	𖄞	𖄟
U+1612x	𖄠	𖄡	𖄢	𖄣	𖄤	𖄥	𖄦	𖄧	𖄨	𖄩	𖄪	𖄫	𖄬	𖄭	𖄮	𖄯
U+1613x	𖄰	𖄱	𖄲	𖄳	𖄴	𖄵	𖄶	𖄷	𖄸	𖄹						
Notes: 1. As of Unicode version 17.0; 2. Grey areas indicate non-assigned code points

== See also ==
- Gurung language
