= Seke language (Nepal) =

Language of Nepal

Seke
- Native to: Nepal
- Region: Mustang District, New York City
- Ethnicity: Gurung people
- Native speakers: (undated figure of 700)
- Language family: Sino-Tibetan: Tamangic; Gurung–Tamang; Gurungic; Seke
- Dialects: Tangbe; Tetang; Chuksang

Language codes
- ISO 639-3: skj
- Glottolog: seke1240
- ELP: Seke (Nepal)

Seke (Serke, Tangbe, Tetang, Chuksang) is a Tamangic language, sometimes considered a separate language from Thakali. Seke is spoken in the villages of Tangbe, Tetang, Chuksang, Chaile, and Gyakar in Mustang District, northern Nepal. Martine Mazaudon has documented the Tangbe dialect of Seke as spoken by an expatriate speaker in Paris. Honda (2002) also documented two other dialects of Seke, Tetang and Chuksang.

== Geographical distribution ==
Seke is spoken by Gurung of Chuksang, Tsaile, Tangbe, Tetang, and Gyakar villages of Mustang District, Dhawalagiri Zone. There are only 700 native speakers of this language, 100 of whom live in New York City. Reportedly, half of the New York City speakers live in the same apartment building.

== Dialects ==
Seke has the following dialects.

- Tangbe
- Tetang
- Chuksang
