= Kutang language =

Endangered Tibeto-Burman language of Nepal

Kutang
- Kuke
- Native to: Nepal
- Ethnicity: Tamangs
- Native speakers: 29 (2011 census)
- Language family: Sino-Tibetan: (Tibeto-Burman); Tamangic?; Ghale; Kutang

Language codes
- ISO 639-3: ght
- Glottolog: kuta1241

Kutang, also known as Kutang Ghale, Kuke, and Kukay, is a minor Tibeto-Burman language of Nepal. Anthropologist Geoff Childs notes that "the term Kukay literally means "Language of Kutang," but it has a double meaning in that the first syllable - ku, for Kutang - is a homonym of the first sylllbe of the Tibetan word for their, kuma. Therefore, Kukay is also interpreted to mean "stolen language," since it incorporates words and phrases from several neighboring languages, including Tibetan."

== Locations ==
Kutang is spoken in Dyang, Rana, Bihi, Ghap, Chak, Kwak, and Krak villages of Bihi VDC, Gorkha District, Gandaki Province, Nepal (Ethnologue).

== Dialects ==
There are three Kutang dialects, Bihi, Chak, and Rana, which have limited intelligibility. The varieties spoken in Chhak and Kwak villages are reportedly similar to each other, and different from the varieties spoken in all of the other villages.
