= Tangbe =

Tangbe ताङबे
- Village
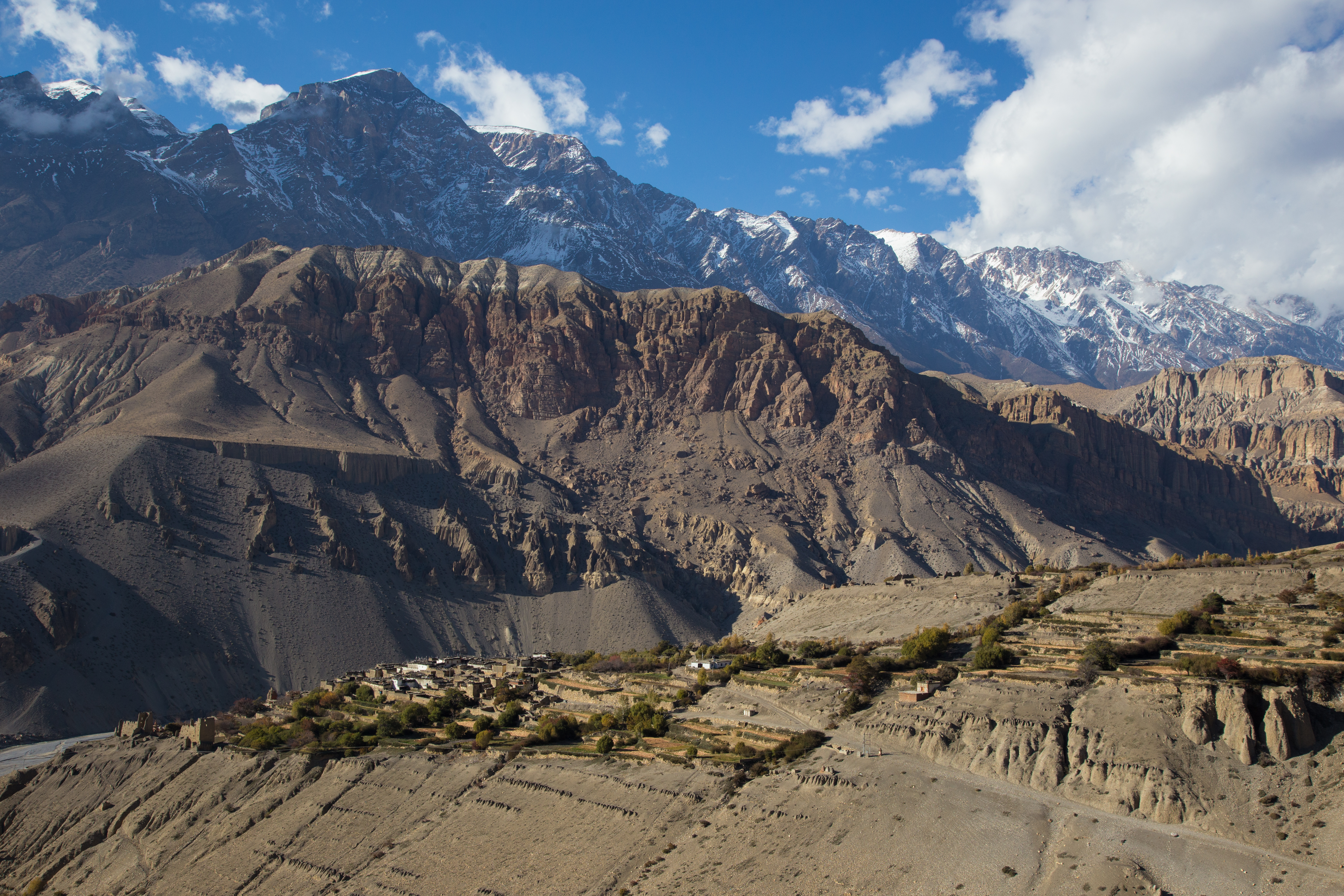
- Tangbe from above

- Location in Nepal Tangbe (Nepal)
- Coordinates: 28°53′20″N 83°48′13″E
- Country: Nepal
- Zone: Dhawalagiri Zone
- District: Mustang District
- Time zone: UTC+5:45 (Nepal Time)

Tangbe (Taye in Tibetan) is a small village in the village development committee of Chhusang in the Mustang District of Nepal. It is located on a promontory with a good view over the Kali Gandaki Gorge on the Upper Mustang trekking route, between Kagbeni and Chhusang.

== Demography ==
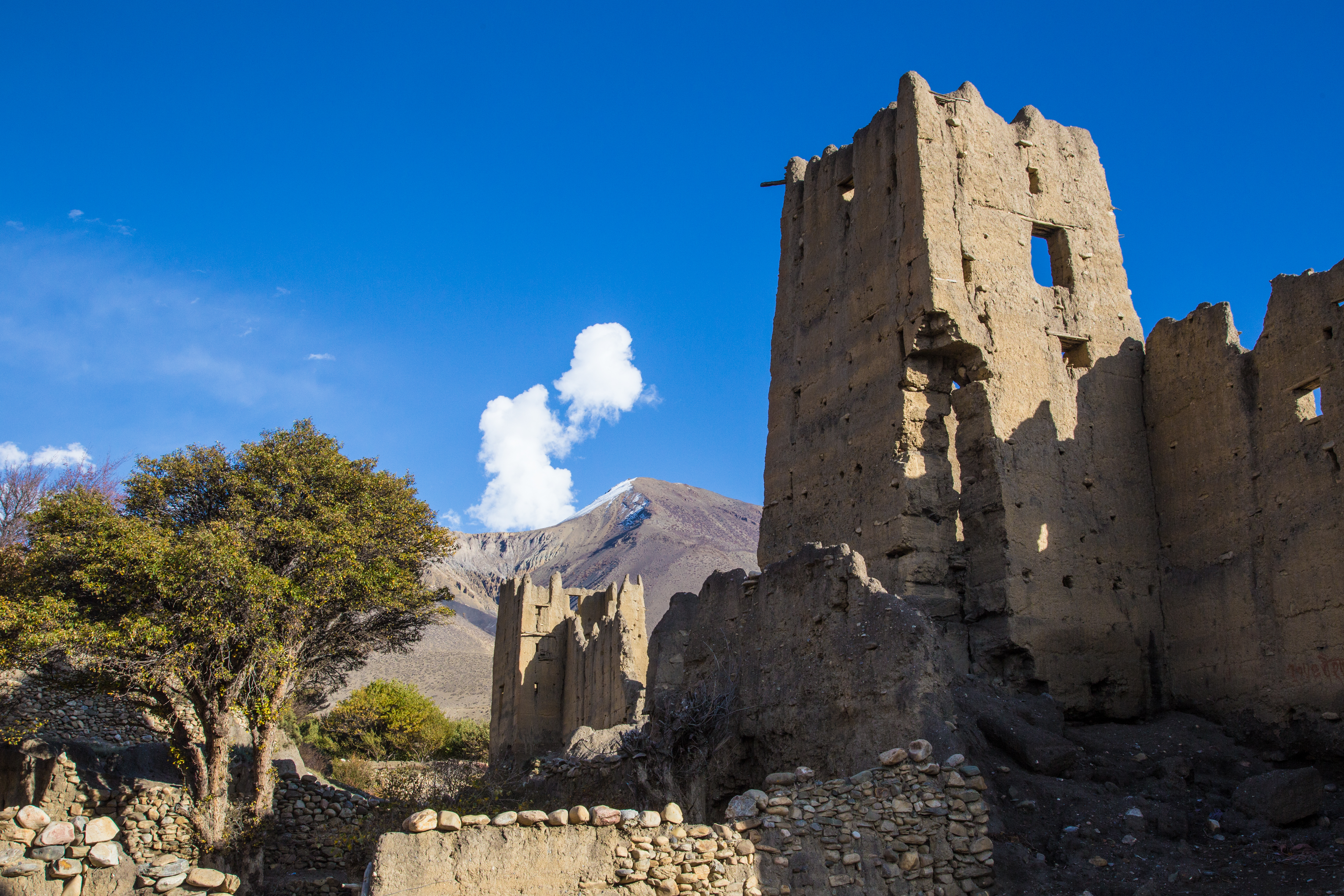
Ruins of an ancient fortress in Tangbe

The people of Tangbe village call themselves "Tangbetani". Most of Tangbetani have surname "Gurung" and some use "Tangbetani" or "Tangbe".

Tangbetanis come from the village of Tangbe, which is a part of the Bahra Gaunle (12 villages) confederation in Mustang district. According to oral history, they have come to Tangbe from Bhurcho of Manang District.

Most of the Tangbetanis have already migrated from Tangbe. A majority of the Tangbrtanis are living in Pokhara, some are living in Kathmandu and some of the Tangbetanis are living in the United States as well as in Australia. There are only 32 households in the Tangbe village. Some 85 families are found in Pokhara, around 25 families in Jomsom, around 20 families in Kathmandu and around 50 individuals in the United States and Australia.

They were traditionally salt traders. The ruins of an ancient fortress have become a silent witness of history, when Tangbe was on a major salt trade route between Tibet and India. After the decline in this trade many years ago, most Tangbetanis stated to be engaged in farming and other vocations. Nowadays a majority of Tangbetanis are owners of Fashion Wear Shops at Pokhara.

The Tangbetanis have been described as an indigenous people of Nepal, residing in the Barha gaun area of Mustang. They resemble Lhoba in physical appearance and are influenced by Tibetan Culture. They have their own unique language called the "Serke" (Tangbe language), meaning 'the golden language'. They have their own unique dress and ornaments. They also have their own traditional cultural songs, which are sung during the festivals. They also dance along with the melody of the songs they sing.

== Religion and Culture ==
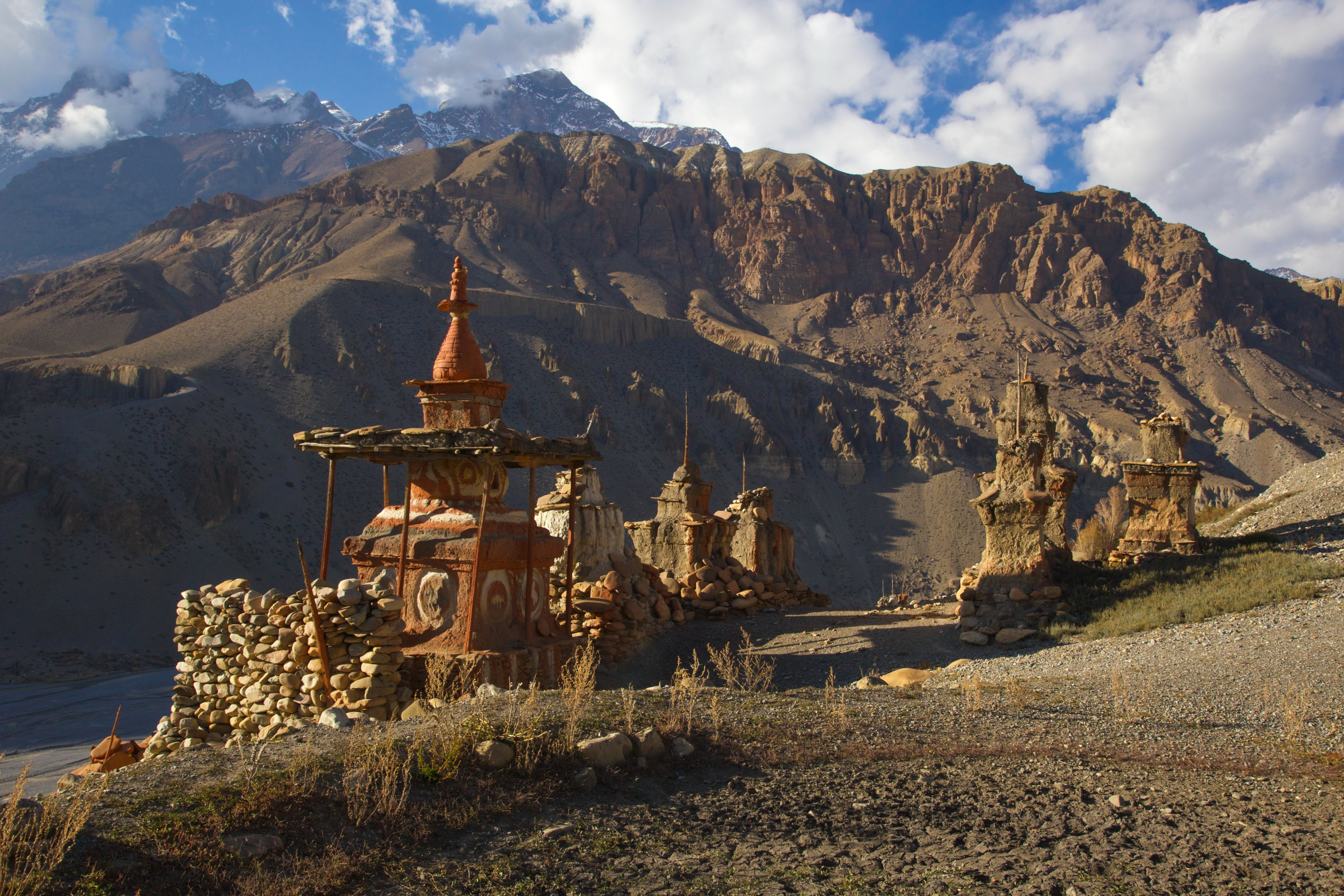
Buddhist chortens in Tangbe

All the Tangbetanis are Buddhist. They celebrate several festivals such as Chhau/ Losar (Lhochhar: New Year), Yartong (The festival of riding on a horse and going to the Muktinath) and Dhachyang (The festival for playing Bow and Arrow). According to their tradition, second son should become Dhawa (Lama: Religious Devotee, Buddhist) and second daughter a Jhuma (a Buddhist nun). Their marriage system is polyandrous by tradition, but such marriages are not practiced anymore.

== Community ==
A social association of Tangbetanis have been established in Pokhara. This association is called "Tangbe Samaj Sewa Sanjh". The office and conference hall of this association is located at Parsyang, Pokhara.

- The President; Tangbe Samaj Sewa Sanjh; Head Office:Parsyang, Pokhara-05, Kaski, Nepal.

== See also ==
- Gandaki River
- Jomsom Airport
- Kali Gandaki Gorge
- Kali Gandaki River
- Mustang District
- Upper Mustang
