= Nar Phu language =

Sino-Tibetan variety spoken in the two villages of Nar and Phu, in Nepal

Nar Phu
- Native to: Nepal
- Region: Manang district
- Native speakers: 600 (2011)
- Language family: Sino-Tibetan: Tamangic; Manang; Nar Phu
- Dialects: Nar (Lower Nar); Phu (Upper Nar)

Language codes
- ISO 639-3: npa
- Glottolog: narp1239
- ELP: Nar Phu

Nar Phu, or ’Narpa, is a Sino-Tibetan variety spoken in the two villages of Nar and Phu, in the Valley of the Nar Khola in the Manang district of Nepal. It forms a dialect continuum with Manang and may be intelligible with it; however, the Nar and Phu share a secret language to confound Gyasumdo and Manang who would otherwise understand them.

== Phonology ==
=== Vowels ===
	Front	Back
Close	i	u
Close-mid	e	o
Open-mid	ɛ	
Low	a	ɑ

The language lacks all middle vowels and the open mid vowel /ɔ/.

=== Consonants ===
		Bilabial	Dental	Retroflex	Alveolo-palatal	Velar
Plosive	unaspirated	p	t	ʈ		k
Plosive	aspirated	pʰ	tʰ	ʈʰ		kʰ
Affricate	unaspirated		ts		tɕ	
Affricate	aspirated		tsʰ		tɕʰ	
Fricative			s		ɕ	
Nasal		m	n		ɲ	ŋ
Lateral	voiced		l			
Lateral	voiceless		l̥			
Rhotic	voiced		r			
Rhotic	voiceless		r̥			
Approximant		w			j	ɰ

Comparatively to the English language, the /g/ is not in the language.

=== Tones ===
Nar Phu distinguishes four tones: high falling, high level, low rising murmured, and mid/low falling murmured.

== Language Patterns ==
Nar-Phu has a different vowel system than other Tamangic languages, due to the amount of front vowels. Nar-Phu is a four-tone language. Tones 1 and 4 are falling; tones 3 and 4 are murmured. Tone 2 is distinguished by its clear, high quality. Nar-Phu has no formal gendered language system, but some suffixes are used to describe animals, even castrated male animals. Honorific Noun phrases are used when there is not a noun in place for said words.

== Swadesh List ==
- čhipruŋ - Nar
- ŋêe min - my name is
- cɦecuke - children
- tɦosor - happy/happier/happiness
- læ̂se/yarcʌkômpʌ - Yarsagompa
- šiŋ - wood
- kɦêpɛ - eighth month
- ɦyâŋi - yaks
- momori - momo
- kɦeskʌ - gas
- læ̂pa - cup
- bɦaʈʈi - hotel
- eki - again
- mɦi - dies
- molompapɛ - religious books
- molom - worship

[1]

== Bibliography ==
- Noonan, Michael (2003). "Nar-Phu" Sino-Tibetan Languages, edited by Randy LaPolla and Graham Thurgood, 336-352. London: Routledge.
- Kristine A. Hildebrandt (2013). “Converb and aspect marking polysemy in Nar” Responses to Language Endangerment: In Honor of Mickey Noonan, edited by Elena Mihas, Bernard Perley, Gabriel Rei-Doval, and Kathleen Wheatley, 97-117. Amsterdam: John Benjamins.
- Kristine A. Hildebrandt, D.N. Dhakal, Oliver Bond, Matt Vallejo and Andrea Fyffe. (2015). “A sociolinguistic survey of the languages of Manang, Nepal: Co-existence and endangerment.” NFDIN Journal, 14.6: 104-122.
- Mandala collections. Nar-Phu | Mandala Collections - Audio-Video. (n.d.). Retrieved December 10, 2021, from https://av.mandala.library.virginia.edu/collection/nar-phu.
