= Yoshio Nishi =

Japanese tibetologist (1934–2019)

Yoshio Nishi (西 義郎 Nishi, Yoshio 1934–2019) was a Japanese scholar of Tibeto-Burman linguistics.

== Education ==
He first studied linguistics while a student at the International Christian University (Tokyo) under the leadership of Roy Andrew Miller. He did his master's coursework at the University of Tokyo and spent time studying at Rangoon University.

== Academic career ==
Nishi taught at Kyushu University (assistant professor; April 1969 - March 1972), Kagoshima University (associate professor; April 1975 - March 1980, professor; April 1980 - September 1981), Ehime University (professor; October 1981 - March 1988), and Kobe City University of Foreign Studies (professor; April 1988 - March 1998).

In 1996 when Kobe City University of Foreign Studies newly founded the linguistics doctoral course at its graduate school, he was the only D-maru-gō professor of linguistics qualified to supervise doctoral students. He is now a professor emeritus at Kobe City University of Foreign Studies, and was nominated in 1993 as a distinguished professor at Central University of Nationalities in Beijing.

== Publications ==
- Nishi Yoshio 西 義郎 (1974) "ビルマ文語の-acについて Birumabungo-no-ac-ni tsuite" [On -ac in Burmese] 東洋学報 Tōyō gakuhō. The Journal of the Research Department of the Toyo Bunko 56.1: 01–43. (Translation published as "Proto-Lolo-Burmese and Old Burmese Sources of Written Burmese -ac". Journal of the South East Asian Linguistics Society 9: 97–129.
- Nishi Yoshio 西 義郎 (1975) "哈尼語緑春方言と揚武方言 Hani and Akha: problems of the subgrouping of Proto-Lolo–Burmese initials".『アジア・アフリカ語の計数研究』 Computational Analyses of Asian and African Languages 2.
- Nishi Yoshio 西 義郎 (1975)「OB ry-について(1) OB ry- ni Tsuite (1)」鹿兒島大學史錄 Kagoshima Daigaku Shiroku 8, 1–16. (Translation published as "Old Burmese ry- a Remark on Proto-Lolo-Burmese Resonant Initials" Journal of the South East Asian Linguistic Society 10.2: 1–10.
- Nishi Yoshio 西 義郎 (1976) "Medials in Burmese" M. Hashimoto(ed.) Genetic relationship, diffusion, and typological similarities of East and Southeast Asian languages. Tokyo: Japan Society for the Promotion of Sciences. Also in Historical science reports of Kagoshima University 26 (1977), 41–52.
- Nishi 西, Yoshio 義郎 (1977). "Tamang 祖語の再構をめぐるいくつかの問題について-1-" [several issues surrounding the reconstruction of proto-Tamang]. 鹿児島大学史学科報告 Kagoshima Daigaku Shigakuka hōkoku (in Japanese). 26: 53–68.
- Nishi 西, Yoshio 義郎 (1978). "タマン諸語の声調について" [On the tones of Tamangic languages]. アジア・アフリカ語の計数研究 [Computational Analyses of Asian & African Languages] (in Japanese). 8: 1–16.
- Nishi Yoshio 西 義郎 (1978). "「カガテ語（中央チベット方言）における緊高：緩低レジスター」" [Register in Kagate (a Central Tibetan dialect)]. アジア・アフリカ語の計数研究 [Computational Analyses of Asian & African Languages]. 9. Japanese.
- Nishi Yoshio 西義郎(1983)「チベット語の歴史と方言研究の問題」 [Topics in the study of the history and dialects of the Tibetan language],『チベット文化の総合的研究』
- Nishi Yoshio 西義 (1985). 「中国国内のチベット・ビルマ語系の言語見られる方向指示の動詞接辞」Chūgoku kokunai no Chibetto Biruma-go-kei no gengo mi rareru hōkō shiji no dōshi setsuji ["Directional verb prefixes as seen in the Tibetan-Burman languages of China"] 西田龍雄 Nishida Tatsuo『チベット・ビルマの諸語の言語数型学的研究』 Chibetto Biruma no shogo no gengo-sū-gata-gaku-teki kenkyū [Computational linguistic studies of Tibeto-Burman languages] 昭和59年度科学研究費補助金研究成果報告書 Shōwa 59-nendo kagakukenkyūhihojokin kenkyū seika hōkoku-sho [Outcome report for the grant-in-aid for scientific research for the year Showa 59] pp. 26–45
- Nishi Yoshio 西 義郎 (1987). "「現代チベット語方言の分類」" [The classification of modern Tibetan dialects]. 国立民族学博物館研究報告 [Bulletin of the National Museum of Ethnology]. 11 (4). Japanese: 837–900. hdl:10502/2932.
- Nishi 西, Yoshio 義郎 (1989b). "チベット語". In 亀井 Kamei, 孝 Takashi; 河野 Kōno, 六郎 Rokurō; 千野 Chino, 栄一 Eichi (eds.). 三省堂言語学大辞典 The Sanseido Encyclopaedia of Linguistics (in Japanese). Vol. 2. Tokyo: 三省堂 Sanseido Press. pp. 783a – 788b. ISBN 4385152160.
- Nishi 西, Yoshio 義郎 (1989c). "トゥルン語" [Thulung, Thulunge, Thulungye, (LSI) Thūlung, Thulung Rai; Deusali]. In 亀井 Kamei, 孝 Takashi; 河野 Kōno, 六郎 Rokurō; 千野 Chino, 栄一 Eichi (eds.). 三省堂言語学大辞典 The Sanseido Encyclopaedia of Linguistics (in Japanese). Vol. 2. Tokyo: 三省堂 Sanseido Press. pp. 1269a – 1278b. ISBN 4385152160.
- Nishi Yoshio 西義郎(1990a) "Can fowls fly hundreds of miles over the Himalayas" Sakiyama, O. and Sato, S.(eds.) 'Asian Languages and General Linguistics', Sanseido, Tokyo.
- Nishi Yoshio 西 義郎 (1990b) 「ヒマラヤ諸語の分布と分類 (上)」 The Distribution and Classification of Himalayan Languages ( Part I ). 『国立民族学博物館研究報告』 Bulletin of the National Museum of Ethnology 15.1: 265–337.
- Nishi Yoshio 西 義郎 (1991) 「ヒマラヤ諸語の分布と分類 (中)」 The Distribution and Classification of the Himalayan Languages (Part II) 『国立民族学博物館研究報告』 Bulletin of the National Museum of Ethnology 16.1 pp. 31–158
- Nishi 西, Yoshio 義郎 (1992a). "ハユ語" [Hayu, Hai, Vayu, (LSI) Hāyu, Vāyu]. In 亀井 Kamei, 孝 Takashi; 河野 Kōno, 六郎 Rokurō; 千野 Chino, 栄一 Eichi (eds.). 三省堂言語学大辞典 The Sanseido Encyclopaedia of Linguistics (in Japanese). Vol. 3. Tokyo: 三省堂 Sanseido Press. pp. 253a – 269a. ISBN 4385152179.
- Nishi 西, Yoshio 義郎 (1992b). "バンタワ語" [Bantawa, Bantāwā, Bāntāwā, Bantava; Bontawa, Bontāwā; Buntāwā, Bāntuwā]. In 亀井 Kamei, 孝 Takashi; 河野 Kōno, 六郎 Rokurō; 千野 Chino, 栄一 Eichi (eds.). 三省堂言語学大辞典 The Sanseido Encyclopaedia of Linguistics (in Japanese). Vol. 3. Tokyo: 三省堂 Sanseido Press. pp. 380a – 391a. ISBN 4385152179.
- Nishi 西, Yoshio 義郎 (1992c). "ヒマラヤ語系" [Himalayish languages]. In 亀井 Kamei, 孝 Takashi; 河野 Kōno, 六郎 Rokurō; 千野 Chino, 栄一 Eichi (eds.). 三省堂言語学大辞典 The Sanseido Encyclopaedia of Linguistics (in Japanese). Vol. 3. Tokyo: 三省堂 Sanseido Press. pp. 495a – 505b. ISBN 4385152179.
- Nishi 西, Yoshio 義郎 (1992). "---語" [Manang]. In 亀井 Kamei, 孝 Takashi; 河野 Kōno, 六郎 Rokurō; 千野 Chino, 栄一 Eichi. 三省堂言語学大辞典 The Sanseido Encyclopaedia of Linguistics (in Japanese). 4. Tokyo: 三省堂 Sanseido Press. pp. 103b–11b. ISBN 4385152128.
- Nishi 西, Yoshio 義郎 (1992d). "ヒマラヤ諸語" [Himalayish languages]. In 亀井 Kamei, 孝 Takashi; 河野 Kōno, 六郎 Rokurō; 千野 Chino, 栄一 Eichi (eds.). 三省堂言語学大辞典 The Sanseido Encyclopaedia of Linguistics (in Japanese). Vol. 3. Tokyo: 三省堂 Sanseido Press. pp. 505b – 552a. ISBN 4385152179.
- Nishi 西, Yoshio 義郎 (1992e). "マガル語" [Magar, (LSI) Māgarī, Magar, Mangar]. In 亀井 Kamei, 孝 Takashi; 河野 Kōno, 六郎 Rokurō; 千野 Chino, 栄一 Eichi (eds.). 三省堂言語学大辞典 The Sanseido Encyclopaedia of Linguistics (in Japanese). Vol. 4. Tokyo: 三省堂 Sanseido Press. pp. 28a – 40b. ISBN 4385152128.
- Nishi 西, Yoshio 義郎 (1992g). "マンチャト語" [Manchad, Manchaṭi, (LSI) Manchāṭī]. In 亀井 Kamei, 孝 Takashi; 河野 Kōno, 六郎 Rokurō; 千野 Chino, 栄一 Eichi (eds.). 三省堂言語学大辞典 The Sanseido Encyclopaedia of Linguistics (in Japanese). Vol. 4. Tokyo: 三省堂 Sanseido Press. pp. 211a – 216b. ISBN 4385152128.
- Nishi 西, Yoshio 義郎 (1992h). "ランパ語" [Rangpa]. In 亀井 Kamei, 孝 Takashi; 河野 Kōno, 六郎 Rokurō; 千野 Chino, 栄一 Eichi (eds.). 三省堂言語学大辞典 The Sanseido Encyclopaedia of Linguistics (in Japanese). Vol. 4. Tokyo: 三省堂 Sanseido Press. pp. 722b – 730a. ISBN 4385152128.
- Nishi Yoshio 西義郎(1992i) A survey of the present state of our knowledge about the Himalayan languages. 国際漢蔵学会(University of California, Berkeley)配布論文。
- Nishi 西, Yoshio 義郎 (1993a). "カナウル語" [Kanaur, Kănaur, Kănāwăr, Kanor, Koonawur, Kunáwar, Kunawar, Kanâr, (LSI), Kanawar; Kanauri, Kănaurī, (LSI) Kanāw^{a}rī; Kanâwari, Kunawaree]. In 亀井 Kamei, 孝 Takashi; 河野 Kōno, 六郎 Rokurō; 千野 Chino, 栄一 Eichi (eds.). 三省堂言語学大辞典 The Sanseido Encyclopaedia of Linguistics (in Japanese). Vol. 5. Tokyo: 三省堂 Sanseido Press. pp. 75b – 86b. ISBN 4385152144.
- Nishi 西, Yoshio 義郎 (1993c). "グルン語" [Gurung (=LSI), Gūrung; Gurungkura]. In 亀井 Kamei, 孝 Takashi; 河野 Kōno, 六郎 Rokurō; 千野 Chino, 栄一 Eichi (eds.). 三省堂言語学大辞典 The Sanseido Encyclopaedia of Linguistics (in Japanese). Vol. 5. Tokyo: 三省堂 Sanseido Press. pp. 135b – 143b.
- Nishi 西, Yoshio 義郎 (1993c). "リンブ語" [Limbū, Limbu, Limboo]. In 亀井 Kamei, 孝 Takashi; 河野 Kōno, 六郎 Rokurō; 千野 Chino, 栄一 Eichi (eds.). 三省堂言語学大辞典 The Sanseido Encyclopaedia of Linguistics (in Japanese). Vol. 5. Tokyo: 三省堂 Sanseido Press. pp. 418a – 447b.
- Nishi Yoshio 西 義郎 (1995) "A Brief Survey of the Controversy in Verb Pronominalization in Tibeto-Burman." New Horizons in Tibeto-Burman Morphosyntax. Y. Nishi, J. A. Matisoff and Y. Nagano (eds). New horizons in Tibeto-Burman morphosyntax. (Senri ethnological studies 41), pp. 1–16. Osaka: National Museum of Ethnology. (https://hdl.handle.net/10502/767)
- Nishi Yoshio 西 義郎 (1997) "The Orthographic Standardization of Burmese: Linguistic and Sociolinguistic Speculations ビルマ語（ミャンマー語）綴字法の標準化 —言語学的，社会言語学的考察—." 『国立民族学博物館研究報告』 Bulletin of the National Museum of Ethnology 22.4: 975–999. (https://hdl.handle.net/10502/3159)
- Nishi Yoshio 西 義郎 (1998) "The Development of Voicing Rules in Standard Burmese Other Titles: 標準ビルマ語における有声化規則の発達" 『国立民族学博物館研究報告』 Bulletin of the National Museum of Ethnology 23.1: PAGES. (https://hdl.handle.net/10502/3167)
- Nishi, Yoshio (1999). Four Papers on Burmese: Toward the history of Burmese (the Myanmar language). Tokyo: Institute for the study of languages and cultures of Asia and Africa, Tokyo University of Foreign Studies.
- Nishi, Yoshio (1999). "古ビルマ語 —ビルマ語史へ向けて Old Burmese: Toward the History of Burmese." 『国立民族学博物館研究報告』 Bulletin of the National Museum of Ethnology 23.3: 659–692.
- Nishi, Yoshio (2000). ヒマラヤ地域のチベット・ビルマ系言語研究の動向 Trends in Studies of Tibeto-Burman Languages in the Himalayan Region: Past and Present 『国立民族学博物館研究報告』 Bulletin of the National Museum of Ethnology 25.2: 203–233. (https://hdl.handle.net/10502/3207)
- Nishi, Yoshio 西 義郎 (2000) and Yasuhiko Nagano. "A general review of the Zhangzhung studies" New Research on Zhangzhung and related Himalayan Languages 1-30. (https://hdl.handle.net/10502/1334)
- Nishi, Yoshio 西 義郎 (2022) "Directional verb affixes found in Tibeto-Burman languages in China." Grammatical Phenomena of Sino-Tibetan Languages 3: 237-258.
  - The bibliography above is not exhaustive.

== Translations ==
- Nishida, Tatsuo (1960). "The numerals of the Hsi-hsia language, their reconstruction and comparative study." Memoirs of the Research Department of the Toyo Bunko 19:123-167.
- Mineya, Toru (1972) "On Divisions of III and IV of the Yunching". Memoirs of the Research Department of the Toyo Bunko 30:65-85.
- Nishida, Tatsuo (1975). "On the development of tone in Tibetan." Acta Asiatica 29:43-55.
- Kitamura, Hajime (1975). "The honorifics in Tibetan." Acta Asiatica 29: 56–74.
