= Thakali language =

Sinto-Tibetan language spoken in Nepal

Thakali
- थकाली
- Native to: Nepal
- Ethnicity: 12,000 Thakali (2021 census)
- Native speakers: 4,200 (2002–2021 census)
- Language family: Sino-Tibetan: Tamangic; Gurung–Tamang; Gurungic; Thakali
- Dialects: Thakali
- Writing system: Devanagari (modern); Tibetan script (historical)

Language codes
- ISO 639-3: ths
- Glottolog: thak1245
- ELP: Thakali
- Thakali is classified as Definitely Endangered by the UNESCO Atlas of the World's Languages in Danger

Thakali is a Sino-Tibetan language of Nepal spoken by the Thakali people, mainly in the Myagdi and Mustang Districts. Its dialects have limited mutual intelligibility.

Other names and dialect names are Barhagaule, Marpha, Panchgaunle, Puntan Thakali, Syang, Tamhang Thakali, Thaksaatsaye, Thaksatsae, Thaksya, Tukuche, Yhulkasom.

== Geographical distribution ==
Thakali is spoken in the middle of the Kali Gandaki River valley and in the upper part of the Kali Gandaki Gorge (also known as Thak Khola), in Mustang District, Gandaki Province. The Thakali area is bounded by Annapurna Himal on one side and Dhawalagiri Himal on the other, with Tatopani village in the south and Jomsom in the north (Ethnologue).

The Tukuche dialect is spoken from Tukuche to Thaksatsae, in 13 villages: Tukuche, Khanti, Kobang, Larjung, Dampu, Naurikot, Bhurjungkot, Nakung, Tithi, Kunjo, Taglung, Lete, Ghansa. Many live outside the area.

== Dialects ==
Ethnologue lists the following dialects of Thakali.

- Tukuche (Tamhang Thakali, Thaksaatsaye, Thaksatsae)
- Marpha (Puntan Thakali)
- Syang (Yhulkasom)

== See also ==
- Seke language (Nepal)
