= Sarkuwa =

Sarkuwa सर्कुवा
- Village development committee
- Location in Nepal Sarkuwa (Nepal)
- Coordinates: 28.17°N 83.60°E
- Country: Nepal
- Zone: Dhaulagiri Zone
- District: Baglung District

Population (1991)
  - Total: 2,516
- Time zone: UTC+5:45 (Nepal Time)

Sarkuwa is a village development committee of the Baglung District of the Dhaulagiri Zone, situated in western Nepal. At the 1991 Nepal census it had a population of 2,516 and 495 houses.

Sarkuwa is situated in the southern part of Baglung district. It is surrounded by Kusmishera, Damek, Paiyunthantap, Rangkhani, Jaidi, Arjewa and Binamare Village Development Committees.

It has one of the oldest high schools of Baglung district. It has been a higher secondary school (Janata Higher Secondary School situated at Ward No. 6- Sarkuwa) since 2006. Sarkuwa has five elementary schools - in Maulachha, Sisnera, Tallamadi, dandamadi Gairamadi and Ganwo.

People from Brahmin, Chhetri, Thakuri, Magar, Sarki and Kami races live in Sarkuwa. All follow the Hindu religion. The population depends on rice, wheat, millet and corn production.

Four villages of Sarkuwa (Maulachha, Sisnera, Ekrate-Ratamata and Sarkuwa) have been electrified from the Theule Khola Hydro Project (25 KW), one (Tallamadi)from Tallamadi Microhydro and the rest from solar batteries. Part of Sarkuwa and Gairamadi and dandamadi are getting electricity from a hydroproject in the neighboring Damek VDC. Two branches of the motorway have been extended from Kusmishera through Sarkuwa.
