= Baglung Jaidi =

Jaidi is a development committees of Baglung District of Gandaki Province, situated in western Nepal. Jaidi is situated in the southern part of Baglung district. It is surrounded by Chisti, Kiwai, Byarthala, Sarkuwa and Arjewa Village Development Committees. According to the census of 2011. this VDC have more than 1000 households. The VDC is again divided into smaller villages called Ward, and it has 9 different Ward within VDC.

The climate of this VDC is warm summer and mild winter.

All people depends on the agriculture, this is the far remote area and there is no any industries so the one and only option is agriculture. For the job and everything people have to leave the village to the urban areas. Since there is very warm summer and good climate its easy to grow everything like rice, barley, corn and so on. Especially Chaura, Chhorelauwa, are the good places for the growing rice and everything.

== Health And Education ==
For the health purpose every VDC have small health post which are very small and is only for the primary medicine. The health condition is not good as expected. It's difficult to get doctors and medicine in case of emergency.

For the education purpose, Since the VDC is divided into smaller villages called Ward, and in every Ward there in one primary school, and within the VDC there are 6 primary schools, one lower secondary school, one secondary school and one higher secondary school. There is no option for the higher education, and the people have to move to the headquarters or capital to pursue higher education.

It has one of the oldest high schools of Baglung district and it has turned into a Higher Secondary School (Jaidi Higher Secondary School situated at Ward No.5- Jaidi) since 2010.

== Ethnic Composition ==
People from Brahmin, Chhetri, Thakuri, Sanyasi, Magar, Damai, Kami and Sarki races are living in Jaidi. All of them follow Hindu religion.

== Livelihood ==
All of the population depends on agriculture. Rice, wheat, millet, Paddy and corn are the major productions. Ten villages of Jaidi, ÁBhedikhalta, Kuidhang, Charluan, Rohote, Ahale, Bhikunthan, Bora, Baauo and Dhullu have been electrified from Central Electricity. Telecommunication is accessible in almost all villages now. Two branches of raw motorway have been extended from Kusmishera through Sarkuwa, to Byarthala and Jaidi.
