= Smart village =

Approach for off-grid communities

A smart village is a rural, often off-the-grid community that uses modern technological-based solutions to achieve an increased standard of living. The concept of smart villages represents a modern approach to revitalizing impoverished communities around the world; the objective of the concept is to assist policy makers, donors and socio-economic planners in providing essential services to rural communities worldwide. The concept has received significant attention in the context of Asian and African countries, although it has also been implemented in other parts of the world.

Smart villages typically combat barriers to energy access in rural areas through the introduction and use of renewable resources in place of fossil fuels, particularly in underdeveloped and developing countries.

== Off-grid communities ==
The term "off-grid" broadly refers to energy independence from a centralized electrical grid. Villages with off-grid systems typically have semi-autonomous or autonomous means of satisfying electricity demand through the on-site generation of renewable energy. Off-grid communities are classified as micro-grid, nano-grid and pico-grid based on size and energy generation thresholds.

Access to un-interrupted and low-cost electricity is an important requirement for the sustainable development of rural communities. In 2015, Adnan Z. Amin, director of the International Renewable Energy Agency (IRENA), estimated that 60% of the additional electricity generation needed for "universal energy access" must come from off-grid solutions, and pointed to the rapid development of solar energy systems in Bangladesh as a positive example of providing electricity access.

Roughly 80% of the world's population lives in rural areas, a majority of which do not have consistent access to electricity. Due to underemployment, residents of rural areas often migrate to urban localities, where employment opportunities are more easily available due to robust industrial infrastructure and consistent availability of electricity. Low-cost, IRENA-sponsored power generation projects based on renewable energy present an attractive option for off-grid electrification of rural areas in Asian countries.

== ICT Village Model ==
The ICT Village is a smart village concept that aims to eradicate poverty in villages through sustainable development and the introduction of information and communications technology. Replicas of the model have been launched in several developing countries.

In 2009, the United States Strategic Command's Global Innovation and Strategy Center published a framework based on the ICT Village model for manufacturing and deplopying a "Village Infrastructure in a Kit" (VIKA). The stated purpose of the kit was to provide "power, a water production and purification system, and telecommunications capabilities" for underserved populations living in isolated, medium-sized villages.

Solar Village

The first ICT village project was launched in Honduras in 1999, following the devastation caused by Hurricane Mitch. With the support of UNESCO, Infopoverty, and the Organization of American States (OEA), two independent solar villages were implemented in the communities of San Ramon and San Francisco. Each community was provided with solar panels and internet access provided by a SATNET satellite. As a result, over 30,000 people in the previously isolated communities were provided with E-learning and telemedicine services, and were able to connect to the rest of the world through e-commerce and e-government initiatives.

Borji Ettouil

In November 2003, the implementation of the ICT Village model in the Tunisian village of Borji Ettouil was proposed during the World Summit on the Information Society, with the support of the Government of Tunisia. The model was supported by the National Solidarity Fund and implemented successfully, leading to its replication in several other developing countries. The village was subsequently visited by numerous government delegations and personalities.

Meiss al-Jabal

The village of Meiss al-Jabal in southern Lebanon was proposed as the site of an ICT Village project by United Nations official Staffan de Mistura. In order to support the refugee communities living in the village, it was provided with two digitized classrooms, a dedicated satellite connection and specialized devices for remote consultation and assistance services. Rapid development of the students' professional skills was observed following the start of the project. However, the project was halted following the village's near-total destruction during the 2006 Lebanon War.

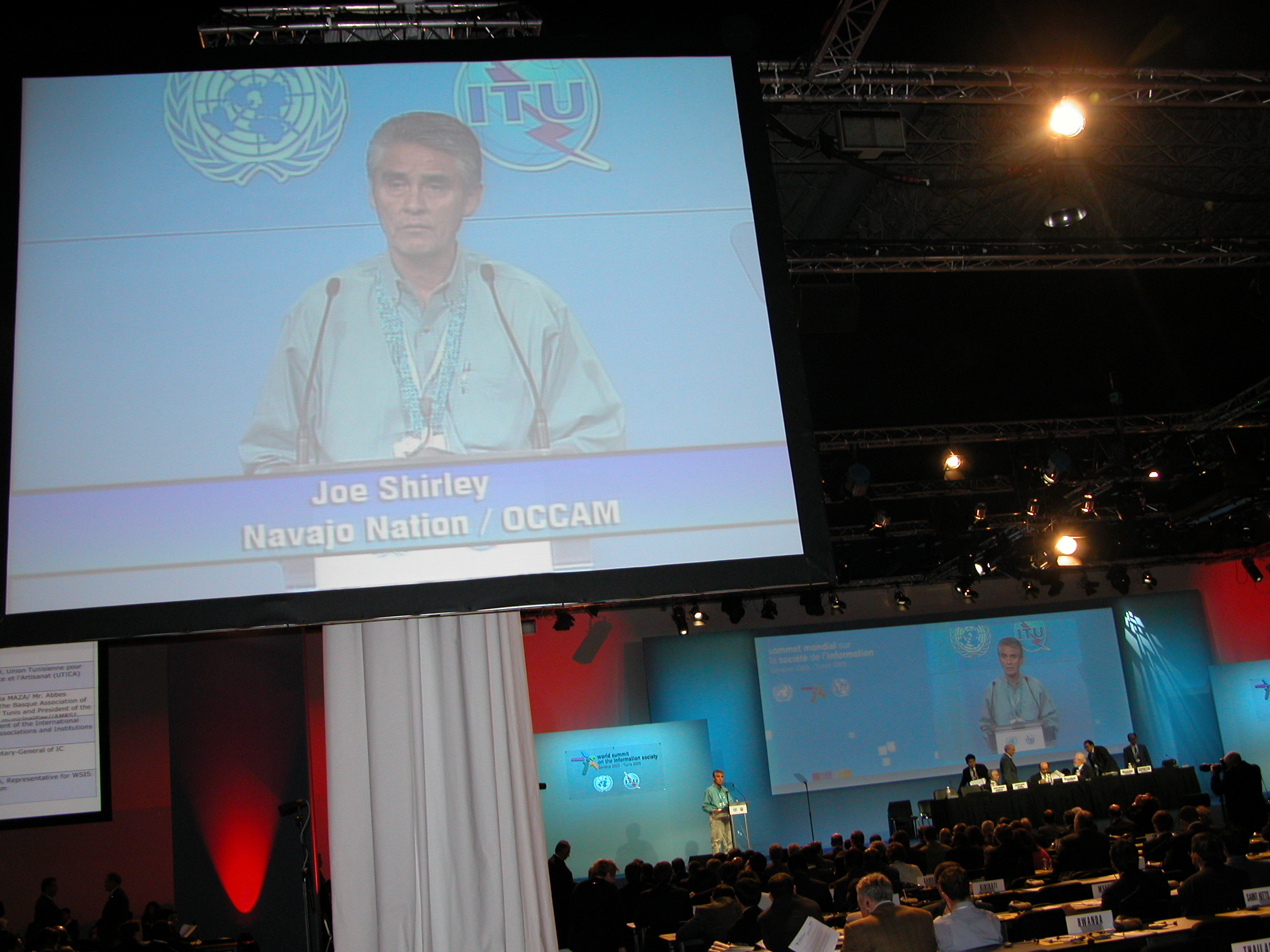
John Shirley announcing the Navajo Nation Portal at WSIS Tunis in 2005.

Navajo Nation

In 2005, John Shirley, the president of the Navajo Nation, announced the creation of the Navajo Nation Portal at the 2005 World Summit on the Information Society in Tunis. The project was launched with the aim of facilitating increased digitalization in indigenous populations, and saw the construction of several access and training centers in pueblos within the Navajo Nation reservation.

Sambaina

The "Millenium Village Project", an ICT smart village project, was launched in 2008 in the village of Sambaina, with the support of Madagascar president Marc Ravalomanana. The project introduced telemedicine to the village via the establishment of a new digitized health unit, and was able to achieve a reduction in pre-postpartum and early childhood mortality. A separate e-learning initiative saw the outfitting of classrooms with computers and other digital devices, as well as the provision of central internet access to the village population.

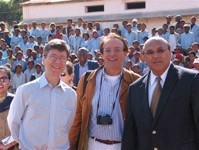
Jeffrey Sachs with Pierpaolo Saporito, president of OCCAM, at the Sambaina ICT Village.

The village of Sambaina was provided with internet access via a direct broadband connection supplied by Eutelsat, a French satellite operator. The broadband connection operated on state frequencies, allowing hospitals, schools, and other public municipalities to access the Internet free of charge.

The Millenium Village Project in Sambaina soon received international attention. In 2006, American economist Jeffrey Sachs, and United Nations secretary-general Kofi Annan visited the village and pledged additional support for the project via the United Nations Development Programme and the Millennium Challenge Corporation.

The Ville Village Project

OCCAM launched the Ville-Village Project in 2005 to encourage direct collaboration between villages in developing countries and cities in advanced countries. The project's goal was to foster mutual cultural and social enrichment, in order to optimize the use of resources provided by local authorities and NGOs to development projects.

The first Ville-Village was ratified in 2008 with an agreement signed by Jean Pierre Razafi, the Ambassador of Madagascar in Italy, and Lorenzo Guerini, the mayor of the Italian city of Lodi. The city of Lodi was selected for its technological entities, such as Padano Technology Park, the city hospital's active telemedicine sector, and the NGOs operating in its territory. Digital development service centers were created to provide services in Sambaina, including phytopathology and veterinary services.

Mahobong

In 2007, the village of Mahobong in Lesotho experimented with the Digital Services Global Platform, a tool created by OCCAM to link village communities with global experts. The tool was used to set up telemedicine visits, with phytopathology and parasitology experts offering diagnosis and treatment services to village residents. The project made use of a newly-developed ultrasound device which allowed for remote ultrasounds suitable for preventing pre- and post-natal mortality and assisting in emergency interventions. The project also allowed for the export of knowledge in the field of cultivation, limiting harvesting and food production losses within the village. The project was realized by OCCAM in collaboration with the Department of Protection of Agrifood and Urban Systems of the University of Milan.

== Smart villages in Asia ==
A 2012 report published by the International Finance Corporation (IFC) found that Asia has the largest off-grid population in the world, with 55% of the global off-grid population and a total of 798 million people lacking access to electricity. Roughly 700 million of these people are located in rural Asia. Further research studies have highlighted the difficulties South Asian and Sub-Saharan African countries have encountered in attempting to expand their electrification rate, in contrast to regions in Latin America and East Asia where electrification has progressed rapidly. In contrast, many Central Asian countries are able to produce large amounts of electricity for export to neighboring countries, due to the presence of large natural resource deposits within their borders.

Electrification is highly important in rural communities. Different international, national and local organizations use separate indicators for measuring and reporting the presence of mini-grids and stand-alone electrical systems in rural areas. Several South Asian countries, including India, Bangladesh, Sri Lanka and Nepal, have made significant progress in rural electrification through the development of off-grid communities.

=== East Asia ===
East Asia is home to 22% of the world population, and 38% of the population of Asia.

Japan: Public confidence in the safety of nuclear power was greatly damaged by the Fukushima Daiichi nuclear disaster, allowing for the quick development of off-grid electrical systems and supplies. So-called "alternative energy" technologies have become standard offerings in newly constructed homes. Japanese real estate developer Sekisui House has noted that 80% of single-family homes in Japan are constructed with alternative energy technologies, such as solar panels and fuel cells. Reflecting the broader national approach to energy production, the executive director of Sekisui has stated: "If you're going to use electricity, you might as well make it yourself".

South Korea: In June 2015, the Smart Villages Initiative conducted a workshop in Seoul to familiarize the South Korean population with the technological advances supporting off-grid communities, and their role in ensuring rural energy access.

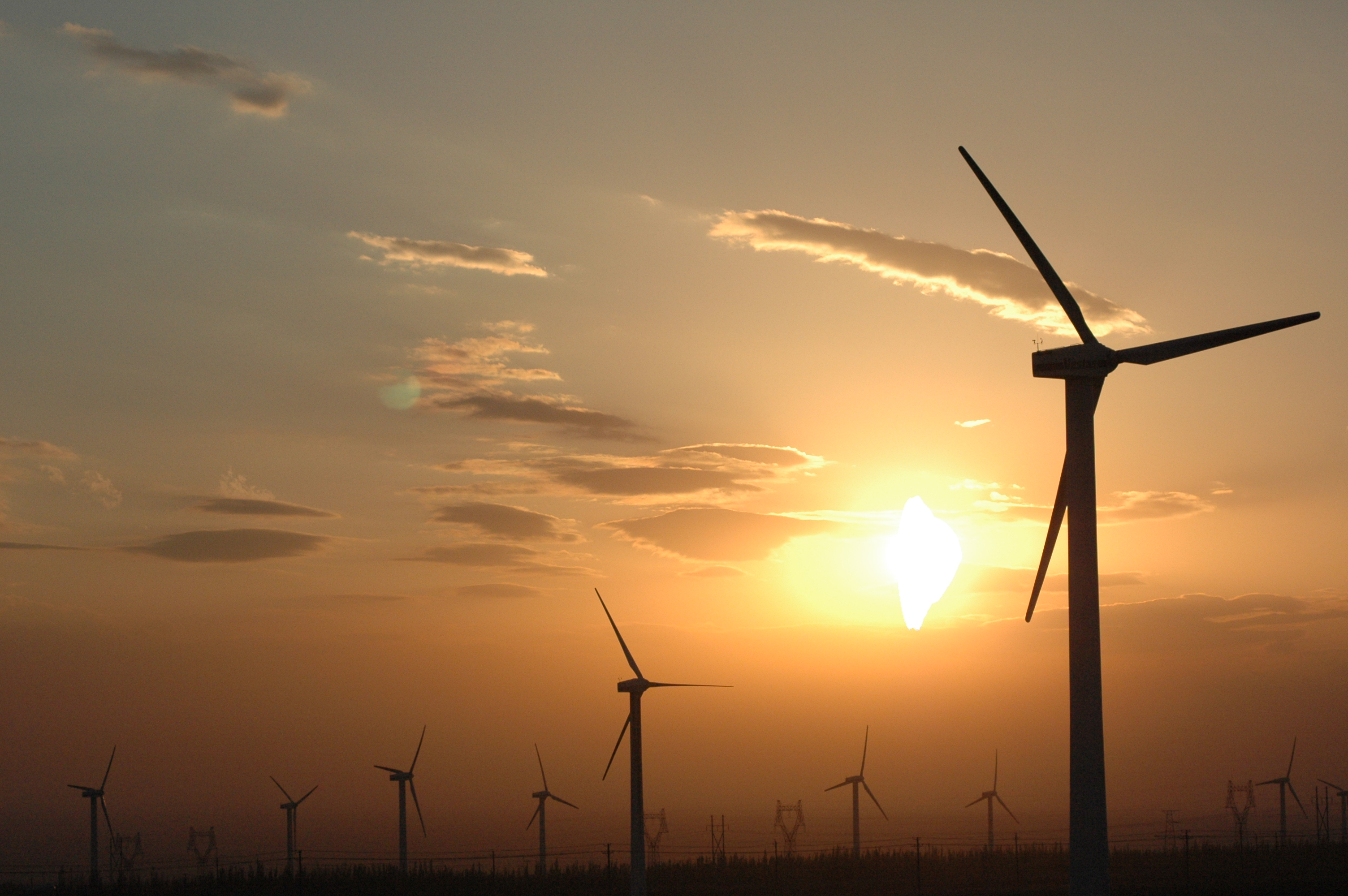
Wind farm in Xinjiang, China.

China: A 2013 report published by IRENA enumerated a total of roughly 60,000 diesel and hydro mini-grid systems in China, most of them connected to a centralized energy grid. The report further highlighted the installation of 118 GW of solar photovoltaics systems, of which 500 MW was installed in off-grid systems.

Malaysia: The Government of Malaysia has encouraged the production and use of clean energy, particularly solar power, for rural electrification, and has supported research into off-grid and alternate energy production platforms.

Indonesia: Indonesians living in rural areas often use fossil fuels for power, due to low local electrification rates. Many remote communities suffer from complete lack of electricity access, and receive no service from Perusahaan Listrik Negara, Indonesia's state-owned electricity company. The Indonesian government proposed a renewable energy plan to raise the quality of life in rural communities, in which power plants would be owned, managed and maintained by the rural communities themselves.

Philippines: With more than 2,000 inhabited islands, it is difficult to extend the Philippines' national electrical grid to communities in remote areas. Hybrid Social Solutions, a Filipino organization with the states goal of eradicating "energy poverty" in rural areas, has distributed solar panels to poor communities across the country with the goal of building an ecosystem to support standalone solar energy devices for use by villagers, along with community-based solar projects.

North Korea: North Korea has been plagued by chronic energy shortages. The use of alternative energy sources in place of fossil fuel consumption has been considered by the country's leadership in order to satisfy the basic socio-economic requirements of its people.

=== West Asia and Middle East ===
Out of 19 countries/territorial states in western Asia, five countries are classified as "financially stable" by The World Factbook and possess resources for social development.

Turkey: Turkey is Europe's leading producer of geothermal energy, and possesses substantial renewable energy resources. The country plans to further increase its production of hydropower, wind energy, and solar energy, and anticipates that 30% of its electricity production will come from renewable resources by 2023.

Iraq: Following the Iraq War, the country faced a significant energy crisis and shortfall of electricity production. In April 2013, Ministry of Electricity spokesman Musaab Mudarres announced that by the end of the year, the crisis "will be over for households with supply of electricity around the clock across the country. By the end of 2014, Iraq would have met industrial demand as well". However, political instability in the country has hampered reliable and neutral assessment of Iraq's energy needs and production capacity.

Yemen: Prior to the Saudi Arabian-led intervention in Yemen, government surveys reported that up to 93% of Yemen's rural population used gas canisters as their primary source of energy. On average, Yemen's rural residents spend 55% of their income on food, water and energy. The national power supply, where available, comes from government-run plants, the majority of which run on diesel. The addition of new capacity have been slow, and the transmission network remains weak throughout the country, leading to regular brownouts and blackouts.

=== Northern Asia ===
Russia: The largest Asian country by surface area, Russia is the world's fourth-largest electricity producer after the United States, China, and Japan. Russia exports electricity to several countries, including multiple Eastern European states such as Latvia, Lithuania and Poland. However, a recent rise in energy imports has been reported due to increasing costs of production.

=== South Asia ===
Afghanistan: Problems with insufficient power supply have continued to plague Afghanistan, which primarily covers its electricity demand through imports from electricity-exporting countries such as Uzbekistan, Tajikistan, Turkmenistan and Iran. The government has disbursed USD$4 billion in order to build additional power supply infrastructure in rural areas, but energy deficiencies in villages and cities are still significant. A large solar power project, funded at a cost of $18 million by the government of New Zealand, has begun supplying energy to 2,500 households, businesses and government buildings in the Bamyan Province of Afghanistan.

Bangladesh: According to the World Bank, roughly 62% of Bangladesh's population had access to electricity in 2013, including 90% of urban residents and 43% of rural residents. Bangladesh is ranked at 134th out of 144 countries on the quality of electricity supply. The Renewable Energy for Rural Economic Development (RERED) Project has sought to raise levels of social development and economic growth by increasing access to electricity in rural areas. Under REFED, notable improvements have been made to social and economic outcomes in rural areas by extending access to electricity via off-grid Solar Home Systems (SHS). The World Bank report envisages that further addition of off-grid systems in a cost-effective manner could accelerate benefits to populations that face uncertain waiting periods for grid-based electricity, or are unlikely to obtain grid-based electricity due to their remote or inaccessible locations. The report also highlights the role of joint public-private ownership models in providing off-grid electricity services to the population of Bangladesh.

India: India is a leading country in the installation and implementation of mini-grids and off-grid systems in impoverished areas.The National Solar Mission (NSM) is a major policy initiative to promote the production of solar energy, including off-grid power development. The International Finance Corporation and the World Bank have collaborate with private stakeholders to provide an off-grid market for reliable electricity to rural Indians with no access to national grids. The Global Off-Grid Lighting Association (GOGLA), a nonprofit organization, was formed from a joint initiative between the World Bank and a private sector consortium in 2012. The program was launched in order to provide off-grid electricity to two million rural Indians by 2015, and is designed with a series of interventions to simplify regulatory hurdles and bypass delays caused by red tape.

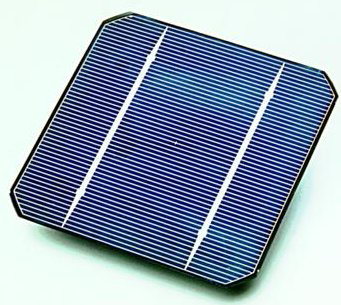
Solar cells

India's first smart village was developed by the Eco Needs Foundation (ENF) in Dhanora, a village within Rajasthan. The project was developed by Prof. Priyanand Agale and Dr. Satyapal Singh Meena. The project consists of five elements; retrofitting, redevelopment, greenfield, e-Pan and livelihood. The ENF has used the project as a framework for adopting villages and promoting sustainable development by providing sanitation services, safe drinking water, and other basic amenities.

Prior to the project's launch, Dhanora was an impoverished village with a population of roughly 2,000. The area's residents had no access to water, electrical or sanitation facilities, and would often defecate in the unpaved streets, leading to significant health issues. Other issues affecting the village included a lack of fluoridated drinking water, road encroachment, frequent brownouts and blackouts, high unemployment rates, and the lack of a centralized school system. The ENF's smart village project attempted to ameliorate these issues with the following initiatives:

1. The construction of 822 toilets with internal plumbing in the district, leading to the village's certification as an "Open Defecation Free" panchayat by the district administration.
2. The installation of a dedicated sewage line and the construction of a nearby sewage treatment plant.
3. The construction of nearly 2 km of concrete roads within the village.
4. The construction of eight percolation tanks in order to collect and conserve rainwater. All eight tanks were built with a combined groundwater recharge capacity of 97.49 million liters, and were designed to store enough water to irrigate nearby farms in the spring.
5. The construction of a 2 km highway connecting Dhanora to nearby Dhodekapura, allowing for ease of external access.
6. Other planned or ongoing initiatives include the installation of solar-powered street lights, the construction of a new library and sports complex, and the provision of Wi-Fi services for internet access.

Maldives: In 2015, Maldivian president Mohamed Nasheed launched an initiative to transform the country into a "stronghold" of solar power by providing rooftop solar panels to rural villages. Under the aegis of this project, the first solar panels was installed atop a school in the Villimale district of Male. However, the country still faces challenges with providing electrical access to residents in remote and inaccessible areas.

Nepal: Most of Nepal's current energy needs in rural reas are met with inefficient energy sources, including various forms of biomass such as firewood, agricultural residues, and animal waste. The rest is supplied by fossil fuels, including petroleum and coal. Only 12% of the country's population uses electricity derived from renewable resources. Roughly 50% of households in Nepal are connected to the national grid, primarily in urban or semi-urban areas, while 80% of the population is rural. In 2012, the government of Nepal launched a National Rural and Renewable Energy Program with the goal of using government subsidies to electrify rural and underdeveloped areas areas. According to Nepal's 2011 Living Standards Survey, 96% of urban residents and 63% of rural residents have access to electricity. Nepal's first mini-grid, built with a total capacity of 107 kW, was completed in 2012 to connect hydropower plants in the towns of Rangkhani, Paiyuthanthap, Sarkuwa and Damek.

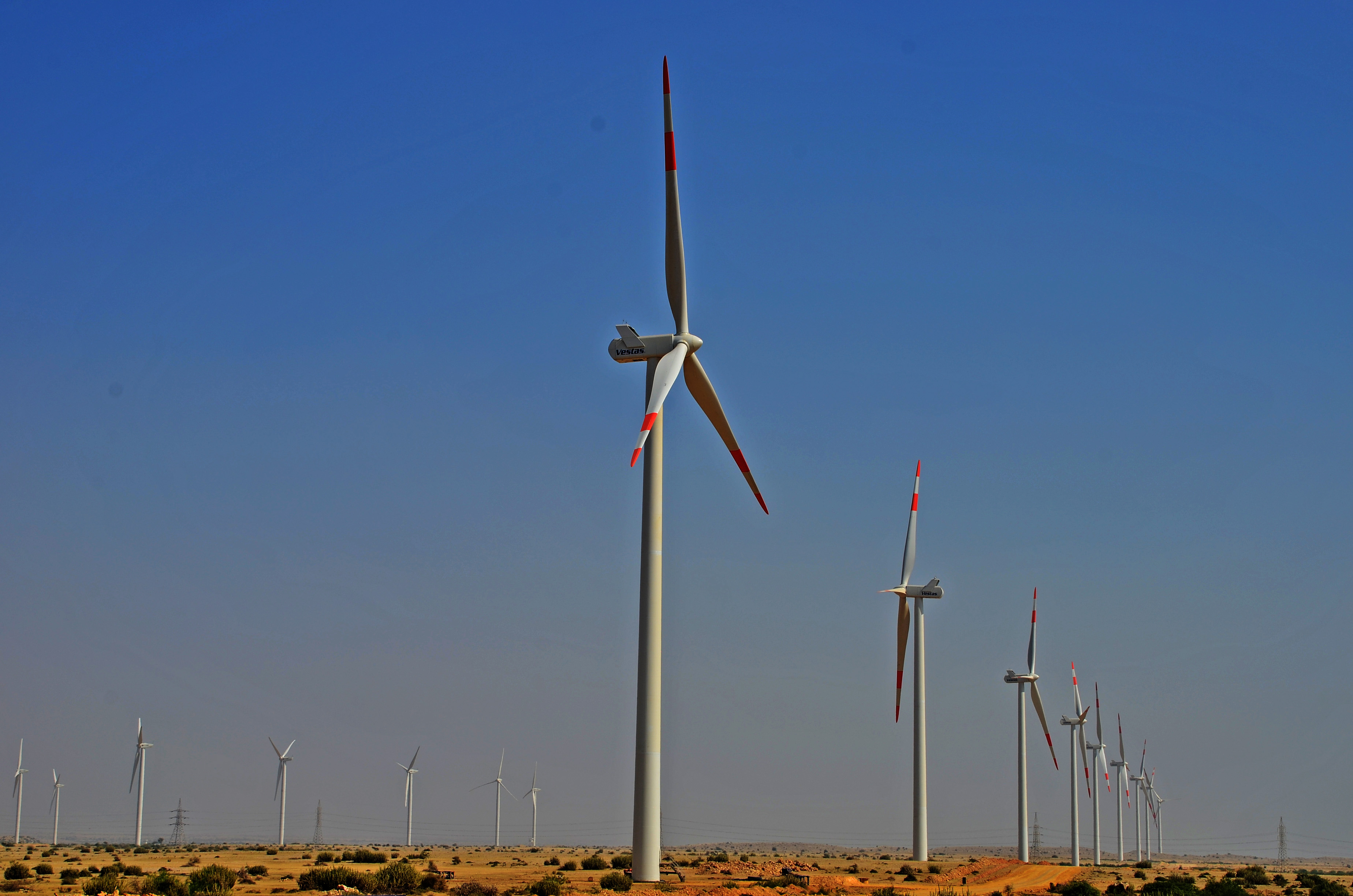
Jhimpir Wind Farm.

Pakistan: Pakistan's geographic location is conducive to the use of solar panels; the country is ranked 6th in the world in terms of total solar irradiance, and most areas enjoy 8 to 10 hours of daily uninterrupted sunshine. Remote and inaccessible areas are generally used to construct off-grid wind and solar farms, and the use of solar energy in rural villages has steadily grown. Paskistan's Rural Support Programmes Network received the Ashden Award in 2016 for its work in building and developing smart villages in the northern areas of the country. A 2015 World Bank study revealed that 44% of Pakistani households have no access to grid-based electricity, with 80% of these households residing in remote and rural areas.

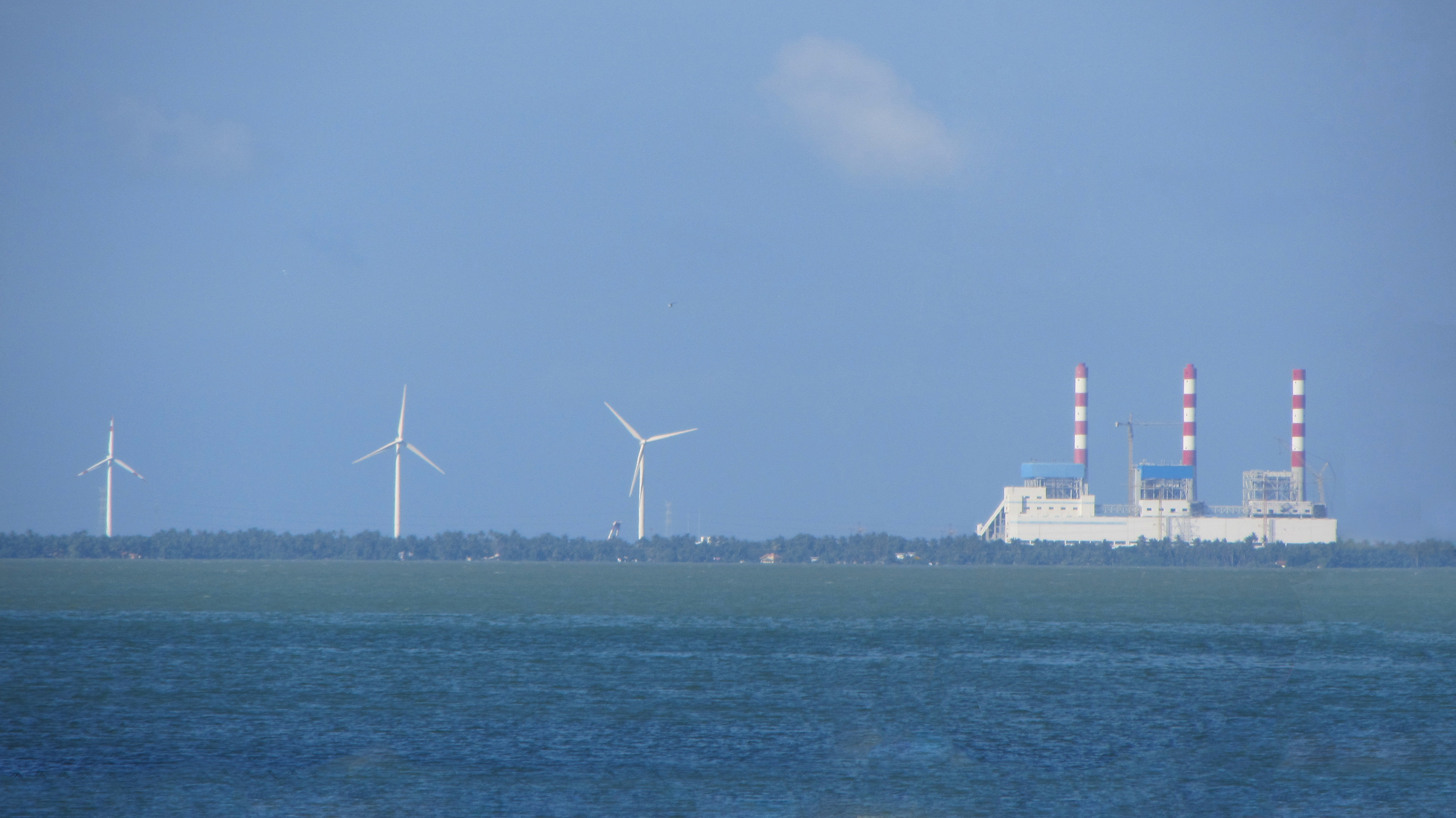
Lakvijaya Power Station.

Sri Lanka: Off-grid electrification schemes are common in Sri Lanka, despite systematic grid expansion projects carried out by the Sri Lankan government to add to the national grid. Most of the village hydropower schemes in Sri Lanka are aided by the RERED project and funded by the World Bank; these initiatives have established over 100 such schemes throughout the country, with electricity generation capacities ranging from 3-50 kW. However, off-grid electrification continues to diminish due to the rapid expansion of the national grid, which now serves more than 90% of all households in the country, and Sri Lanka's limited land area compared to other South Asian nations.

=== India ===
In 2015, the Smart Villages Research Group launched a competition in India, encouraging entrepreneurial individuals and organizations to launch programs providing energy access to rural villages.

The participants were asked to identify areas where off-grid electrical systems were "thriving", and were provided a platform as "energy entrepreneurs" to discuss ways in which similar off-grid systems could be implemented elsewhere. The competition offered a cash prize of Rs. 1 million to the winner, as well as an opportunity to attend the World Sustainable Development Forum and showcase their business on a global stage.

=== Pakistan ===
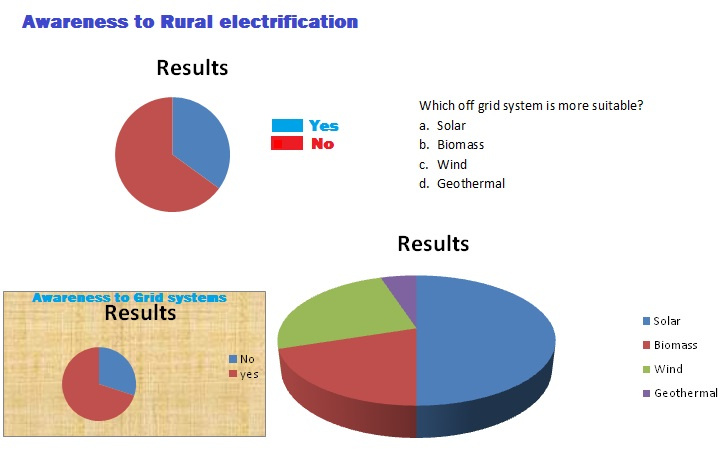
Pie chart of survey conducted by a female student of Aga Khan Higher Secondary School.

A similar competition was held in the neighboring country of Pakistan. One of the participants, a female student of Aga Khan Higher Secondary School in Karachi, conducted a survey of villagers in remote areas by reaching out to them through cellular phones via social media. She found that 50% of the people surveyed were unsatisfied with the rural electrification services provided by the Pakistan Electric Power Company and other power distribution companies. A majority of respondents believed that off-grid systems constituted a major need for many villages in Pakistan, and were in favor of installing solar panels and wind turbines for energy generation in remote areas to increase the country's energy production capacity.

== Smart villages in Europe ==
The concept of smart villages has been discussed in the European context with regards to isolated communities in the Czech Republic, Montenegro and Poland. In 2022, an offshoot of the European Youth Parliament discussed the topic as part of a debate on regional development.

In Germany, a project called SMARTinfeld won the Land of Ideas award in the Smart Communities category in 2023. By using LoRa technology and the internet of things, the German village of Martinfeld has made many typical smart city applications suitable for a smart village. The use of LoRa is justified by its large range and ease of use. For example, a local weather station park can use the technology to monitor several different environmental metrics, such as the temperature of the road surface, the local water level, or the temperature fluctuations in nearby mountains.

== See also ==
- Renewable energy in Asia
- Renewable energy in developing countries
- Smart city
