= Jaimini Municipality =

Jaimini
- Municipality
- Location in Nepal
- Country: Nepal
- Province: Gandaki Province
- District: Baglung District
- Established: 10 March 2017

Government
  - Mayor: Nara Bahadur Pun
  - Deputy Mayor: Harihar Sharma

Area
  - Total: 118.71 km^{2} (45.83 sq mi)

Population (2021)
  - Total: 24,628
  - Density: 207.46/km^{2} (537.33/sq mi)
- Time zone: UTC+5:45 (NST)
- Website: jaiminimun.gov.np

Jaimini (Nepali: जैमिनी) is a municipality in Baglung district of Gandaki province of Nepal. Nearby cities include Kusma and Baglung. Its geographic coordinates are 28.182101" N 83.613602" E. Jaimini Municipality is surrounded by Parbat district on the east, Galkot Municipality and Bareng Rural Municipality on the west, Khathekhola Rural Municipality and Baglung Municipality on the north and Gulmi and Parbat districts on the south. The population of the municipality declined to 24,628 at the 2021 Nepal census. 100% of the residents were Nepali citizens, of which 78.9% were literate.
