= Paiyunthanthap =

Paiyunthantap is one of the village development committees of Baglung district, in the Dhaulagiri Zone of Nepal. It lies in the southern belt of the district. Paiyunthantap borders with Sarkuwa in the south-east, Rangkhani in the south and west and Damek in the east and north.
