= Khunga =

Khunga may refer to:

- Khunga, Baglung
- Khunga, Panchthar
