= Devisthan =

Devisthan is the name of several towns and villages in Nepal:

- Devisthan, Achham
- Devisthan, Baglung
- Devisthan, Khotang
- Devisthan, Myagdi
- Devisthan, Parbat
