= Dudilabhati =

Dudilabhati दुदिलाभाटी
- Village
- Country: Nepal
- Province: Gandaki
- District: Baglung
- Municipality: Galkot

Population (2021)
  - Total: 3,580
  - Religions: Hindu
- Time zone: UTC+5:45 (Nepal Time)

Dudilabhati is a village that constitutes Ward 1 of Galkot Municipality. Located in Baglung district of Gandaki Province, it was formerly a village development committee of Baglung in the Dhaulagiri Zone of Western Development Region, Nepal. According to 2021 Nepal census, it had a population of 3580.
