= Jaidi =

Jaidi or Jaïdi may refer to

- Jaidi, Nepal, a village in central Nepal
- Baglung Jaidi, a development committee of Baglung District in western Nepal
- Athar Shah Khan Jaidi, Pakistani comedian, poet and writer
- Aziz Jaidi (born 1967), Moroccan police officer
- Radhi Jaïdi (born 1975), Tunisian football player
