= Daga Tumdada =

Coordinates: 28°14′N 83°17′E

Daga Tumdada दागा थुमडाँडा
- Village development committee
- Location in Nepal Daga Tumdada (Nepal)
- Country: Nepal
- Zone: Dhaulagiri Zone
- District: Baglung District

Population (1991)
  - Total: 4,874
  - Religions: Hindu
- Time zone: UTC+5:45 (Nepal Time)

Daga Tumdada is a village development committee in Baglung District in the Dhaulagiri Zone of central Nepal. At the time of the 1991 Nepal census it had a population of 4,874 and had 897 houses in the town.
