= Tangram (disambiguation) =

Tangram is a dissection puzzle.

Tangram may also refer to:

- Tangram, Nepal, a village in Nepal
- Tangram (album), a 1980 album by Tangerine Dream
- Tangram (video game), a 1991 puzzle game by Thalion Software
