= Sunkhani =

Sunkhani may refer to:

- Sunkhani, Baglung, Nepal
- Sunkhani, Sindhulpalchok, Nepal
- Sunkhani, Nuwakot, Nepal

== See also ==
- Sunakhani, Dolakha, Nepal
