= Hile, Baglung =

Coordinates: 28°17′N 83°23′E

Hila हिल
- Village development committee
- Location in Nepal Hila (Nepal)
- Country: Nepal
- Zone: Dhaulagiri Zone
- District: Baglung District

Population (1991)
  - Total: 2,891
  - Religions: Hindu
- Time zone: UTC+5:45 (Nepal Time)

Hile is a village development committee in Baglung District in the Dhaulagiri Zone of central Nepal. At the time of the 1991 Nepal census it had a population of 2,891 and had 530 houses in the village. The town was founded in 1978.
