= Ranasingh Kiteni =

Ranasingh Kiteni रणसिंह किटेनी
- Village development committee
- Location in Nepal Ranasingh Kiteni (Nepal)
- Coordinates: 28.31°N 83.27°E
- Country: Nepal
- Zone: Dhaulagiri Zone
- District: Baglung District

Population (1991)
  - Total: 2,673
  - Religions: Hindu
- Time zone: UTC+5:45 (Nepal Time)

Ranasingh Kiteni is a village development committee in Baglung District in the Dhaulagiri Zone of central Nepal. At the time of the 1991 Nepal census it had a population of 2,673 and had 493 houses in the town.
