= Paiyunnyap =

Coordinates: 28°12′N 83°39′E

Paiyunthantap पैयूँथानटाप
- Village development committee
- Location in Nepal Paiyunthantap (Nepal)
- Country: Nepal
- Zone: Dhawalagiri Zone
- District: Baglung District

Population (1991)
  - Total: 4,027
  - Religions: Hindu
- Time zone: UTC+5:45 (Nepal Time)

Paiyunthantap is a village development committee in Baglung District in the Dhawalagiri Zone of central Nepal. At the time of the 1991 Nepal census it had a population of 4,027 and had 711 houses in the town.
