= Burtibang =

Coordinates: 28°20′N 83°10′E

Burtibang बुर्तिबाङ
- Village development committee
- Location in Nepal Burtibang (Nepal)
- Country: Nepal
- Zone: Dhaulagiri Zone
- District: Baglung District
- Time zone: UTC+5:45 (Nepal Time)

Burtibang (Nepali: बुर्तिबाङ) is a village development committee in Baglung District in the Dhaulagiri Zone of central Nepal. Burtibang is the second-largest commercial city in the district after Baglung.

Burtibang is the center of Dhorpatan municipality Municipality in the western part of Baglung District in Gandaki province. Dhorpatan municipality with 9 wards has been formed by merging the then Burtibang, Khunga, Adhikarichaur and Bobang VDCs. Along with the confluence of Nisi, Bhuji and Taman rivers, the source of the Badigad river is also Burtibang. Burtibang is also one of the 10 cities of the new city development project forward by the Government of Nepal under the Mid-Hill Pushpalal Highway, the gateway to most important religious site Uttaraganga, the only one hunting reservation in Nepal, the Dhorpatan hunting reserve. Burtibang, which is connected to the Mid-HillHighway and the Dhorpatan-Saljhandi-Lumbini highway and the national road network, is developing as an emerging rural town and business hub. Located at a distance of 90 km from Baglung district headquarters, the city has not yet been able to provide good health services. There is also a district level hospital here. Only the primary health center is in operation. While some private sector hospitals have come into operation, the area, which has been plagued by armed people's war, has been undergoing rapid urbanization since 2065 BS. Even though there are already national banks and government offices, all of them fled to the district headquarters during the People's War. Later, after the peace process started, they have been re-established. At present, more than 10 national level banks, financial institutions, Land Revenue Office, Survey Office, Area Administration office, forest office, area police office and all the important government office including administration and security have been reached.

community Radio Dhorpatan, the first radio station in the western Baglung region operated through Burtibang, and two other radios have made significant contributions in the field of information and communication in West Baglung along with Burtibang. The Nisi Bhuji Janata Campus, the only one campus in the Baglung West region, has contributed to some extent to higher education and some private and government schools have contributed to the overall education in the western region along with Burtibang. Stating that the Baglung district headquarters has not been reached for development and infrastructure construction, health and education, the people and representatives of the region have demanded that some municipalities of West Baglung including Dhorpatan Municipality, Nishikhola, Tamankhola, Badigad and Tarakhola Ruralmunicipality be made separate Burtibang districts at different times and places. Are even rising.

Burtibang Bhagwati Temple is a major religious site, while other tourist and religious sites include Arnakot Barah Temple, Arnakot, Narasimhakot near Burtibang and Dhorbarah Temple, Uttarganga, Nepal's only hunting reserve, Dhorpatan Hunting Reserve and small peaks in Dhorpatan within municipality. And to be a tourist destination.

Burtibang, a rural town that has been undergoing rapid urbanization since 2065 BS, has become a major urban hub along with West Baglung, Gulmi, Pyuthan and Rukum. Spread over an area of 222 sq km, the town has a population of over 26,000. More than one lakhs people of West Baglung and neighboring districts are also benefiting directly from the city.

== Media ==
Radio: to promote local culture Burtibang has two Community radio stations. One is Radio Dhorpatan F.M 104.1 MHz and the other is Radio Paribartan - 91 MHz. Radio Burtibang
