= Malma =

Malma may refer to:

- Malma, Nepal, a village
- Malma Chaudury, an EastEnders character introduced in 2006

== See also ==
- Dolly Varden trout, Salvelinus malma malma
- Malmö, a city in Sweden
