= Praiyunpata =

Coordinates: 28°10′N 83°33′E

Bijuwa विजुवा
- [Jaimini Municipality ward No. 9]
- Location in Nepal Bijuwa (Nepal)
- Country: Nepal
- Zone: Dhaulagiri Zone
- District: Baglung District

Population (2019)
  - Total: 1,101
  - Religions: Hindu
- Time zone: UTC+5:45 (Nepal Time)

Bijuwa is a Village of Jaimini Municipality Nepal Former ward no. 1 & 9 of Paiyunthanthap village development committee, in Baglung District, in the Dhaulagiri Zone of central Nepal. At the time of the 2019 A.D. it had a population of 1101 and had 211 houses in the town.
