= Harichaur =

Harichaur हरीचौर
- Village development committee
- Location in Nepal Harichaur (Nepal)
- Coordinates: 28.25°N 83.42°E
- Country: Nepal
- Zone: Dhaulagiri Zone
- District: Baglung District

Population
  - Religions: Hindu
- Time zone: UTC+5:45 (Nepal Time)

Harichaur is a village in Baglung District in the Dhaulagiri Zone of central Nepal.
