= Resh, Nepal =

Resh, Nepal रेश
- Village development committee
- Nickname(s): रेश, Resha, Resh
- Location in Nepal Resh, Nepal (Nepal)
- Coordinates: 28.23°N 83.54°E
- Country: Nepal
- Zone: Dhaulagiri Zone
- District: Baglung District

Population (1991)
  - Total: 4,407
  - Religions: Hindu
- Time zone: UTC+5:45 (Nepal Time)

Resh is a village development committee in Baglung District in the Dhaulagiri Zone of central Nepal. At the time of the 1991 Nepal census it had a population of 4,407 and had 795 houses in the town.
