= Mulpani =

Mulpani may refer to several places:

== Nepal ==
- Mulpani, Baglung
- Mulpani, Dhading
- Mulpani, Kathmandu
- Mulpani, Bhojpur
