= Lekhani =

Lekhani may refer to:

- Lekhani, Dhawalagiri, Nepal
- Lekhani, Sagarmatha, Nepal
