= Bhimgithe =

Bhimgithe भीमगिठे
- Village development committee
- Location in Nepal Bhimgithe (Nepal)
- Coordinates: 28.30°N 83.21°E
- Country: Nepal
- Zone: Dhaulagiri Zone
- District: Baglung District

Population (1991)
  - Total: 4,459
  - Religions: Hindu; Buddhist
- Time zone: UTC+5:45 (Nepal Time)

Bhimgithe is a former village development committee in Baglung District in the Dhaulagiri Zone of central Nepal which now shares the wards 6 and 7 of Badigad Rural Municipality. At the time of the 1991 Nepal census it had a population of 4,459 and had 781 houses in the village.
