= Batakachaur =

Batakachaur बताकाचौर
- Village development committee
- Location in Nepal Batakachaur (Nepal)
- Coordinates: 28.15°N 83.46°E
- Country: Nepal
- Zone: Dhaulagiri Zone
- District: Baglung District

Population (1991)
  - Total: 4,142
  - Religions: Hindu
- Time zone: UTC+5:45 (Nepal Time)

Batakachaur is a village development committee in Baglung District in the Dhaulagiri Zone of central Nepal. At the time of the 1991 Nepal census it had a population of 4,142 and had 794 houses in the village.

The town is predominantly Hindu but in 1991, 122 Buddhists registered in the town.
