= Tara Khola Rural Municipality =

Tarakhola Rural Municipality ताराखोला गाउँपालिका
- Gaunpalika
- Location in Nepal
- Coordinates: 28.278532°N 83.444934°E
- Country: Nepal
- Province: Gandaki
- District: Baglung District
- Time zone: UTC+5:45 (Nepal Time)
- Website: http://tarakholamun.gov.np/

Tarakhola Rural Municipality (Tarakola Gaupalika) (Nepali: ताराखोला गाउँपालिका) is a Gaunpalika in Baglung District in Gandaki Province of Nepal. On 12 March 2017, the government of Nepal implemented a new local administrative structure, in which VDCs have been replaced with municipal and Village Councils. Tarakola is one of these 753 local units.
