= Chhisti =

Chhisti छिस्ति
- Village development committee
- Location in Nepal Chhisti (Nepal)
- Coordinates: 28.11°N 83.58°E
- Country: Nepal
- Zone: Dhaulagiri Zone
- District: Baglung District

Population (1991)
  - Total: 5,236
  - Religions: Hindu
- Time zone: UTC+5:45 (Nepal Time)

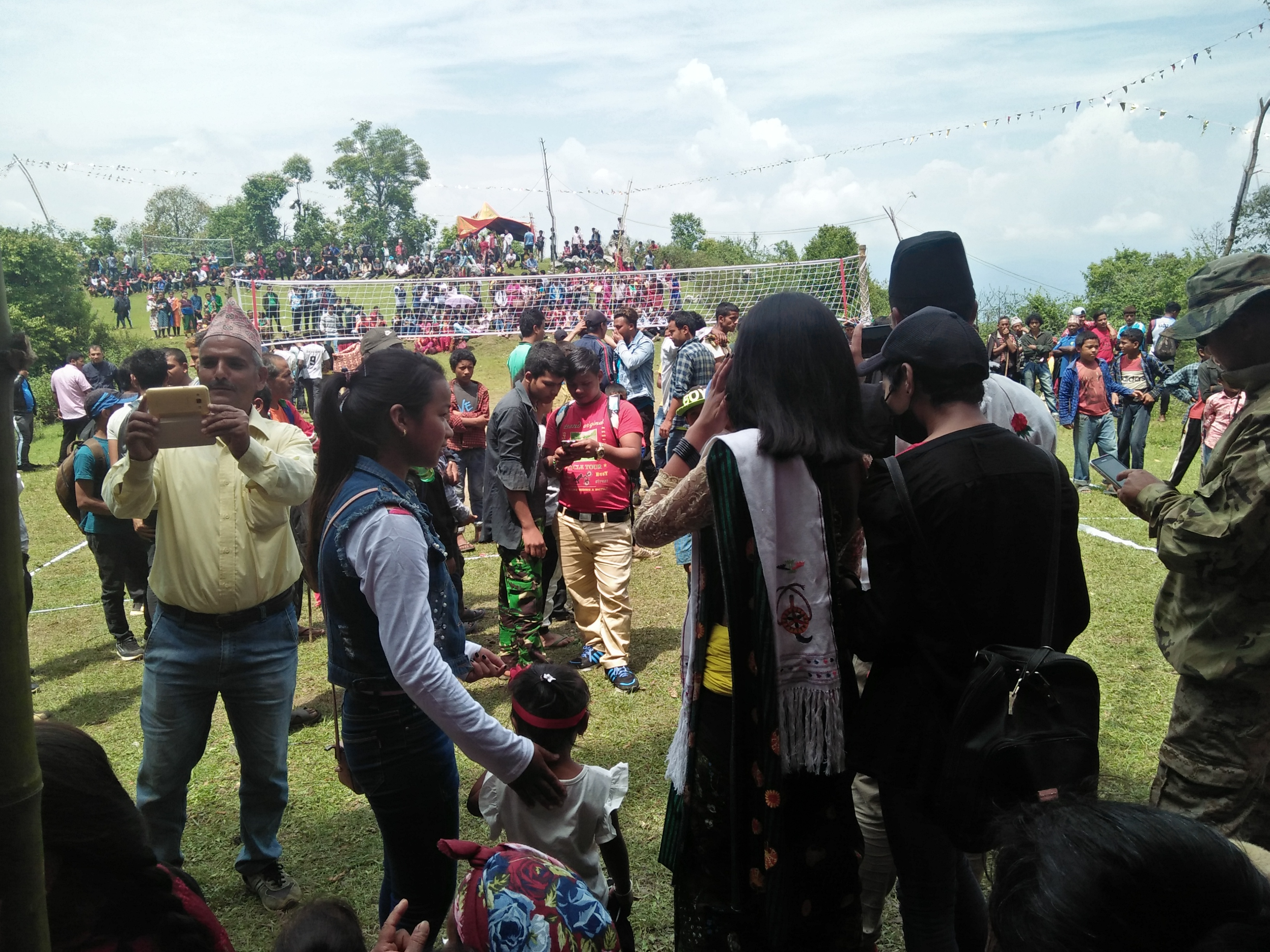
People in Chhisti

Chhisti is a village development committee in Baglung District in the Dhaulagiri Zone of central Nepal. At the time of the 1991 Nepal census it had a population of 5,236 and had 1024 houses in the town.
