= Darling, Baglung =

Darling, Nepal दार्लिङ malarani
- Village development committee
- Nickname: malarani
- Location in Nepal and in baglung district Darling, Nepal (Nepal)
- Country: Nepal
- Zone: Dhaulagiri Zone
- District: Baglung District

Population
  - Total: 7,311
  - Religions: Hindu
- Time zone: UTC+5:45 (Nepal Time)
- Area code: 068

Darling is a village development committee in Baglung District in the Dhaulagiri Zone of central Nepal.
