= Bhakunde =

Coordinates: 28°14′N 83°37′E

Bhakunde भकुण्डे
- Village Development Committee
- Location in Nepal Bhakunde (Nepal)
- Country: Nepal
- Zone: Dhaulagiri Zone
- District: Baglung District
- Highest elevation: 2,215 m (7,267 ft)
- Lowest elevation: 950 m (3,120 ft)

Population (2011)
  - Total: 4,952
  - Ethnicities: Magars Brahmins Chhetries Kami
  - Religions: Hindu
- Time zone: UTC+5:45 (Nepal Time)

Bhakunde is a village development committee in Baglung District in the Dhawalagiri Zone of central Nepal. At the time of the 1991 Nepal census it had a population of 3,833 and had 697 houses in the village. At the time of the 2011 Nepal census it had a population of 4,952 among which 2,443 were female and 2,509 were male. There were about 831 houses in the village.

Elevations in this VDC range from 950 to 2,215 meters. The Dhaulagiri and the Annapurna mountain ranges can be observed from the village.
