= Taman, Nepal =

Taman तामान
- Village development committee
- Location in Nepal Taman (Nepal)
- Coordinates: 28.40°N 83.26°E
- Country: Nepal
- Zone: Dhaulagiri Zone
- District: Baglung District

Population (1991)
  - Total: 2,651
  - Religions: Hindu
- Time zone: UTC+5:45 (Nepal Time)

Taman is a village development committee in Baglung District in the Dhaulagiri Zone of central Nepal. At the time of the 1991 Nepal census it had a population of 2,651 and had 509 houses in the village.
