= Narethanti =

Narethanti नरेठाँटी
- Village development committee
- Location in Nepal Narethanti (Nepal)
- Coordinates: 28.24°N 83.46°E
- Country: Nepal
- Zone: Dhaulagiri Zone
- District: Baglung District

Population (1991)
  - Total: 3,240
  - Religions: Hindu
- Time zone: UTC+5:45 (Nepal Time)

Narethanti is a village development committee in Baglung District in the Dhaulagiri Zone of central Nepal. At the time of the 1991 Nepal census it had a population of 3,240 and had 608 houses in the town.
