= Bihunkot =

Bihunkot बिहुँकोट, बिहुँ
- Village Development Committee
- Location in Nepal Bihunkot (Nepal)
- Coordinates: 28.26°N 83.49°E
- Country: Nepal
- Zone: Dhaulagiri Zone
- District: Baglung District

Population (1991)
  - Total: 5,575
  - Density: 27/km^{2} (70/sq mi)
  - Religions: Hindu
- Time zone: UTC+5:45 (Nepal Time)
- Area code: 33303

Bihunkot is a Village Development Committee in Baglung District in the Dhaulagiri Zone of central Nepal. At the time of the 1991 Nepal census it had a population of 5,575 and had 1071 houses in the town.

== Location ==
It is approximately 17 kilometers from the Baglung Bazzar (city). The lifestyle here is rural. The majority of people here are Brahmins, Kshetri, Magar, Dalit and other castes. Means of transportation for the people here is on foot and due to the construction of highway along the path, people are using buses and jeeps when it comes to long distance travel. But the roads are not back tarred so they may be blocked during the heavy rain in rainy season. Although, the situation is getting better as the construction is going on, it is not as expected. It is a cold place, located above 2000 meters from sea level and hence falls on mountainous region.

The main occupation of the people of the Baglung is agriculture, and some of them are involving in the locale business. The main agricultural production of the Baglung are milk products like ghee, cheese and other types of sweets. People also grow fruits like orange, banana, guava, papaya, and pineapple. The climate of the Baglung is temperate so it has become favourable for the farmer to grow the maximum amount of agricultural production.
