= Tara, Nepal =

Tara तारा TARAKHOLA
- Village development committee
- Location in Nepal Tara (Nepal)
- Coordinates: 28.34°N 83.39°E
- Country: Nepal
- Zone: Dhaulagiri Zone
- District: Baglung District

Population (1991)
  - Total: 3,705
  - Religions: Hindu
- Time zone: UTC+5:45 (Nepal Time)

Tara is a village development committee in Baglung District in the Dhaulagiri Zone of central Nepal. At the time of the 1991 Nepal census it had a population of 3,705 and had 698 houses in the village.
