= Nisikhola Rural Municipality =

Nisikhola Rural Municipality निसीखोला गाउँपालिका
- Gaunpalika
- Location in Nepal
- Coordinates: 28.278532°N 83.444934°E
- Country: Nepal
- Province: Gandaki
- District: Baglung District
- Time zone: UTC+5:45 (Nepal Time)
- Website: https://nisikholamun.gov.np/

Nisikhola Rural Municipality (Nisikola Gaupalika) (Nepali: निसीखोला गाउँपालिका) is a Gaunpalika in Baglung District in Gandaki Province of Nepal. On 12 March 2017, the government of Nepal implemented a new local administrative structure, in which VDCs have been replaced with municipal and Village Councils. Nisikola is one of these 753 local units.
