= Tityang =

Tityang तित्याङ
- Village development committee
- Location in Nepal Tityang (Nepal)
- Coordinates: 28.25°N 83.58°E
- Country: Nepal
- Zone: Dhaulagiri Zone
- District: Baglung District

Population
  - Religions: Hindu
- Time zone: UTC+5:45 (Nepal Time)

Tityang is a village development committee in Baglung District in the Dhaulagiri Zone based in the wetlands of central Nepal.
