= Rayadanda =

Rayadanda रायाडाँडा
- Village development committee
- Location in Nepal Rayadanda (Nepal)
- Coordinates: 28.22°N 83.58°E
- Country: Nepal
- Zone: Dhaulagiri Zone
- District: Baglung District

Population (1991)
  - Total: 2,492
  - Religions: Hindu
- Time zone: UTC+5:45 (Nepal Time)

Rayadanda is a village development committee in Baglung District in the Dhaulagiri Zone of central Nepal. At the time of the 1991 Nepal census it had a population of 2,492 and had 480 houses in the village.
