= Resha, Nepal =

Village in western Nepal

Resha is a village in Baglung District, Dhaulagiri Zone, western Nepal. According to the Census 2011, the total population is approximately 5,000.
