= Amalachaur =

Place in Nepal

Amalachaur अमलाचौर
- Village development committee
- Location in Nepal Amalachaur (Nepal)
- Coordinates: 28°12′36″N 83°38′24″E
- Country: Nepal
- Zone: Dhaulagiri Zone
- District: Baglung District

Population (1991)
  - Total: 5,055
  - Religions: Hindu
- Time zone: UTC+5:45 (Nepal Time)

Amalachaur was a village development committee in Baglung District in the Dhaulagiri Zone of Western Development Region which was annexed to Baglung Municipality in 2016. At the time of the 1991 Nepal census, it had a population of 5,055 and had 943 houses.

== Geography and economy ==
Amalachaur is located at an altitude of 1100 metres and covers an area of 35 hectares. The VDC unit lies on the hills of the western bank of the Kali Gandaki River across Kusma. The highest located suspension bridge in Nepal connects Kushma and Kaiya. Also, the Kushma-Balewa Mechanized Bridge features cable-car style transportation across the Kali Gandaki gorge. Moreover, mud road connects the VDC to the district headquarter in Baglung Bazar.

The economy is mostly based around agriculture and is farmed by about 102 households. As in the neighbouring irrigated communities, the vast majority of farmers are of Brahmin, muslims descent. The average landholding size is 0.34 ha, slightly below average for Baglung district which is 0.41 ha. The 1–2 km irrigation system in Amalachaur, fed by the Dhapa River, a tributary of the Kali Gandaki, is crucial for the livelihoods of the people and was built over a hundred years ago. In 1992–1993, Dhaulagiri Irrigation Development Project improved this system. The main crops grown are maize and paddy, and to a lesser extent, potatoes and vegetables. The closest market centre is at Kusmi Sera, Kusma Bazar and Baglung Bazar, which the villagers of Amalachaur are largely dependent on for various services.
