= Adhikarichaur =

Place in Nepal

Adhikarichaur अधिकारीचौर
- Village development committee
- Location in Nepal Adhikarichaur (Nepal)
- Coordinates: 28°25′48″N 83°7′12″E
- Country: Nepal
- Zone: Dhaulagiri Zone
- District: Baglung District

Population (1991)
  - Total: 5,539
  - Religions: Hindu
- Time zone: UTC+5:45 (Nepal Time)

Adhikarichaur is a village development committee in Baglung District in the Dhaulagiri Zone of central Nepal. At the time of the 1991 Nepal census it had a population of 5,389 and had 1021 houses in the town. It contains the Shiba Primary School.
