= Sisakhani =

Shisakhani शीसाखानी
- Village development committee
- Location in Nepal Shisakhani (Nepal)
- Coordinates: 28.24°N 83.32°E
- Country: Nepal
- Zone: Dhaulagiri Zone
- District: Baglung District

Population (1991)
  - Total: 311
  - Religions: Hindu
- Time zone: UTC+5:45 (Nepal Time)

Shisakhani is a village development committee in Baglung District in the Daulagiri Zone of central Nepal. At the time of the 1991 Nepal census it had a population of 1,845 and had 311 houses in the village.
