= Malika, Baglung =

Malika मालिका Ba.Na .Pa 5
- Village development committee
- Nickname: Birding Area
- Location in Nepal Malika (Nepal)
- Coordinates: 28.31°N 83.57°E
- Country: Nepal
- Zone: Dhaulagiri Zone
- District: Baglung District

Population (1991)
  - Total: 2,242
  - Religions: Hindu
- Time zone: UTC+5:45 (Nepal Time)

Baglung municipality 5 (Malika) is in Baglung District in the Dhaulagiri Zone of central Nepal. At the time of the 1991 Nepal census it had a population of 2,242 and had 433 houses in the village.
