= Baskot =

Baskot बाँस्कोट
- Village development committee
- Country: Nepal
- Zone: Dhaulagiri Zone
- District: Baglung District

Population (1991)
  - Total: 3,562
  - Religions: Hindu
- Time zone: UTC+5:45 (Nepal Time)

Baskot is a village development committee in Baglung District in the Dhaulagiri Zone of central Nepal. At the time of the 1991 Nepal census it had a population of 3,562 and had 675 houses in the town.
