= Kandebas =

Kandebas कन्नेबास
- Village development committee
- Location in Nepal Kandebas (Nepal)
- Coordinates: 28.19°N 83.39°E
- Country: Nepal
- Zone: Dhaulagiri Zone
- District: Baglung District

Population (1991)
  - Total: 2,510
  - Religions: Hindu
- Time zone: UTC+5:45 (Nepal Time)

Kandebash is a village development committee in Baglung District in the Dhaulagiri Zone of Western Nepal. At the time of the 1991 Nepal census it had a population of 2,510 and had 442 houses in the town.
