= Sukhaura =

Sukhaura सुखौरा
- Village development committee
- Location in Nepal Sukhaura (Nepal)
- Coordinates: 28.17°N 83.41°E
- Country: Nepal
- Zone: Dhaulagiri Zone
- District: Baglung District

Population (1991)
  - Total: 1,346
  - Religions: Hindu
- Time zone: UTC+5:45 (Nepal Time)

Sukhaura is administered under Bareng Rural Municipality of Baglung District of Gandaki Province. Sukhaura is located in the south-eastern part of Baglung District bordering Gulmi District in the South. Sukhaura is rich in forest resources. A large area of the village is occupied by the thick forest. Some forest areas are preserved under community efforts. Sukhaura is surrounded by Salyan in the east, Galkot in the north and the west and Chandrakot, Gulmi in the south. Sukhaura is also characterised as one of the politically conscious villages of the district. It is mainly inhabited by the Magar and the Kshetri communities. Nepali is the lingua-franca. People are mostly Hindus. Sukhaura is well-connected with transportation, electricity and communication networks. Water supply is now adequately accessible to each house. There is full-equipped educational facility up to +2 level in Sukhaura. Sukhaura's main economy is based on agriculture and animal husbandry. Maize, millet, barley, wheat, buckwheat and potato are main cereals produced in the village. The village is enriched with medicinal herbs. Nowadays people are trying to modernize the agriculture that is expected to establish the market access to the nearby semi-towns. The villagers are also paying attention to professionalize the animal husbandry. Some notable places are Majhgaun, Dhampu, Pancheuli, Vitriban, Bahundada etc. The village is rapidly modernising in recent times. The village is also rich in culture and tradition. There are a few individuals from the village who have reached very influential position of national politics as well as artistic arena.
