= Nisi, Nepal =

Nisi, Nepal निसि
- Village development committee
- Nickname: kadakhani bahungaun
- Location in Nepal Nisi, Nepal (Nepal)
- Coordinates: 28.46°N 82.96°E
- Country: Nepal
- Zone: Dhaulagiri Zone
- District: Baglung District

Population (1991)
  - Total: 5,215
  - Religions: Hindu
- Time zone: UTC+5:45 (Nepal Time)

Nisi is a village development committee in Baglung District in the Dhaulagiri Zone of central Nepal. At the time of the 1991 Nepal census it had a population of 5,215 and had 1067 houses in the town.
