= Righa =

Village development committee in Nepal

Righa रिघा
- Village development committee
- Location in Nepal Righa (Nepal)
- Coordinates: 28.20°N 83.33°E
- Country: Nepal
- Zone: Dhaulagiri Zone
- District: Baglung District

Population (1991)
  - Total: 3,728
  - Religions: Hindu
- Time zone: UTC+5:45 (Nepal Time)

Righa is a village development committee in Baglung District in the Dhaulagiri Zone of central Nepal. At the time of the 1991 Nepal census it had a population of 3,728 and had 680 houses in the town.
