= Amarbhumi =

Place in Nepal

Amarbhumi अमरभूमि
- Village development committee
- Location in Nepal Amarbhumi (Nepal)
- Coordinates: 28°16′48″N 83°27′0″E
- Country: Nepal
- Zone: Dhaulagiri Zone
- District: Baglung District

Population (1991)
  - Total: 2,248
  - Religions: Hindu
- Time zone: UTC+5:45 (Nepal Time)

Amarbhumi is a village development committee in Baglung District in the Dhaulagiri Zone of central Nepal. At the time of the 1991 Nepal census it had a population of 2,248 and had 409 houses in the village. It has been reported that the villagers of Amarbhumi VDC in Baglung district have changed their village's name to Mulabari (meaning radish farm).
