= Palakot =

Palakot पलाकोट
- Village development committee
- Location in Nepal Palakot (Nepal)
- Coordinates: 28.28°N 83.55°E
- Country: Nepal
- Zone: Dhaulagiri Zone
- District: Baglung District

Population
  - Religions: Hindu
- Time zone: UTC+5:45 (Nepal Time)

Palakot is a village development committee in Baglung District in the Dhaulagiri Zone of central Nepal.
