= Argal =

Argal अर्गल
- Village Development Committee
- Location in Nepal Argal (Nepal)
- Coordinates: 28°17′N 83°13′E
- Country: Nepal
- Zone: Dhaulagiri Zone
- District: Baglung District

Population (1991)
  - Total: 2,148
  - Religions: Hindu
- Time zone: UTC+5:45 (Nepal Time)

Argal is a Village Development Committee in Baglung District in the Dhaulagiri Zone of central Nepal. It is located roughly 25 kilometres west of Baglung. At the time of the 1991 Nepal census it had a population of 2,148 and had 387 houses in the village.

In recent years, Argal has been subject to numerous attacks and trouble with Maoist rebels. On March 18, 2002 it was reported that three terrorists were killed in the Argal area of Baglung district.
