= Khungkhani =

Khungkhani is a Village Development Committee in Baglung District of the Dhaulagiri Zone in central Nepal.

At the time of the 1991 Nepal census it had a population of 1,908 and had 397 houses in the village.

== Demographics ==
The Chhantyal, Dalit, and Magar are the three ethnic groups residing within the Khungkhani VDC.
