= Bhimpokhara =

Bhimpokhara भीमपोखरा
- Village development committee
- Location in Nepal Bhimpokhara (Nepal)
- Coordinates: 28.29°N 83.53°E
- Country: Nepal
- Zone: Dhaulagiri Zone
- District: Baglung District

Population (1991)
  - Total: 2,907
  - Religions: Hindu
- Time zone: UTC+5:45 (Nepal Time)

Bhimpokhara is a village development committee in Baglung District in the Dhaulagiri Zone of central Nepal. At the time of the 1991 Nepal census it had a population of 2,907 and had 545 houses in the village.
