= Dhamja =

Dhamja धाम्जा
- Village development committee
- Location in Nepal Dhamja (Nepal)
- Coordinates: 28.31°N 83.50°E
- Country: Nepal
- Zone: Dhaulagiri Zone
- District: Baglung District

Population (1991)
  - Total: 2,571
  - Religions: Hindu
- Time zone: UTC+5:45 (Nepal Time)

Dhamja is a village development committee in Baglung District in the Dhaulagiri Zone of central Nepal. At the time of the 1991 Nepal census it had a population of 2,571 and had 497 houses in the village. Only some basic developmental infrastructure are on its way to Dhamja. Most people are dependent to the traditional agriculture for their living. Millet, barley, rice, wheat, and various kinds of seasonal fruits and vegetables are the major crops. The foreign remittance is also considered one of the major source of income for the people living there.
