= Jaljala, Baglung =

Coordinates: 28°16′N 83°16′E

Jaljala जलजला
- Village Development Committee
- Location in Nepal Jaljala (Nepal)
- Country: Nepal
- Zone: Dhaulagiri Zone
- District: Baglung District

Population (1991)
  - Total: 3,637
  - Religions: Hindu
- Time zone: UTC+5:45 (Nepal Time)

Jaljala is a Village Development Committee in Baglung District in the Dhaulagiri Zone of central Nepal. At the time of the 1991 Nepal census it had a population of 3,637 and had 624 houses in the town.
