= Hatiya, Baglung =

Coordinates: 28°13′N 83°25′E

Hatiya, Nepal हटिया
- Village Development Committee
- Location in Nepal Hatiya, Nepal (Nepal)
- Country: Nepal
- Zone: Dhaulagiri Zone
- District: Baglung District

Population (1991)
  - Total: 6,015
  - Religions: Hindu
- Time zone: UTC+5:45 (Nepal Time)

Hatiya is a Village Development Committee in Baglung District in the Dhaulagiri Zone of central Nepal. At the time of the 1991 Nepal census it had a population of 6,015 and had 1131 houses in the town.

To Promote local culture Hatiya has one FM radio station Samudayik Radio Galkot - 102.4 MHz Which is a Community radio Station.
