= Hugdishir =

Coordinates: 28°8′N 83°29′E

Hugdishir हुग्दीशिर
- Village development committee
- Location in Nepal Hugdishir (Nepal)
- Country: Nepal
- Zone: Dhaulagiri Zone
- District: Baglung District

Population (1991)
  - Total: 4,366
  - Religions: Hindu
- Time zone: UTC+5:45 (Nepal Time)

Hugdishir is a village development committee in Baglung District in the Dhaulagiri Zone of central Nepal. At the time of the 1991 Nepal census it had a population of 4,366 and had 831 houses in the town.
