= Bungadovan =

Coordinates: 28°25′N 83°13′E

Bongadobhan बोङ्गादोभान
- Village development committee
- Location in Nepal Bongadobhan (Nepal)
- Country: Nepal
- Zone: Dhaulagiri Zone
- District: Baglung District

Population (1991)
  - Total: 4,537
  - Religions: Hindu
- Time zone: UTC+5:45 (Nepal Time)

Bongadobhan is a village development committee in Baglung District in the Dhaulagiri Zone of central Nepal. At the time of the 1991 Nepal census it had a population of 4,537 and had 904 houses in the town.
