= Cheer pheasant =

Conservation status
- Vulnerable (IUCN 3.1)
- CITES Appendix I

Scientific classification
- Kingdom: Animalia
- Phylum: Chordata
- Class: Aves
- Order: Galliformes
- Family: Phasianidae
- Tribe: Phasianini
- Genus: Catreus; Cabanis, 1851
- Species: C. wallichii

Binomial name
- Catreus wallichii (Hardwicke, 1827)

Species of bird

The cheer pheasant (Catreus wallichii), also known as Wallich's pheasant and chir pheasant, is a vulnerable species of the pheasant family, Phasianidae. It is the only member in the genus Catreus. The scientific name commemorates Danish botanist Nathaniel Wallich.

== Description ==
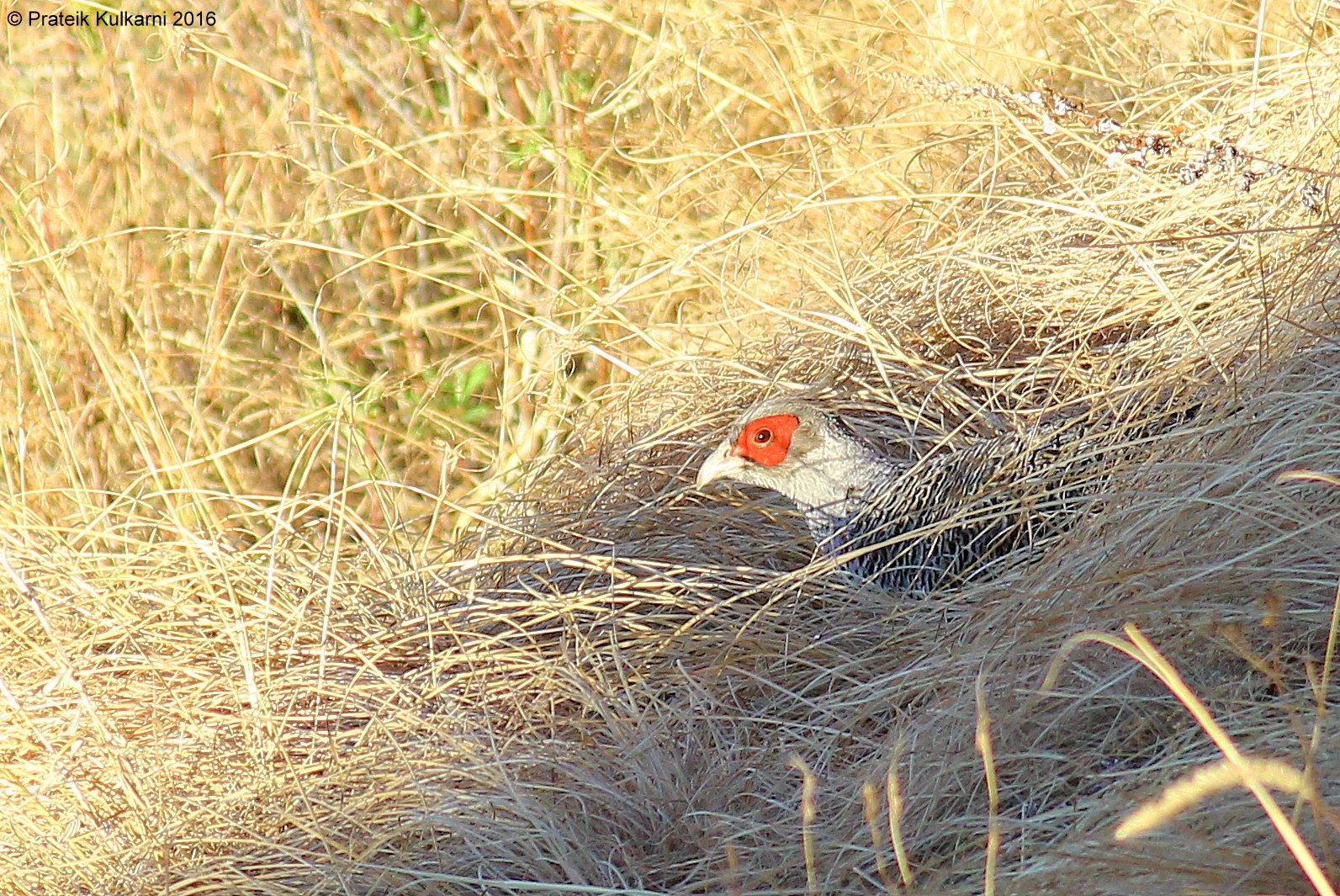
Cheer pheasant (male) at Pangot, Nainital, Uttarakhand, India

Cheer pheasants have buffy gray plumage and long, gray crests, a notable contrast with other pheasants that favor more brilliant colours. Its long tail has 18 feathers. The central tail feathers are much longer, and the colour is mainly gray and brown. The female is slightly smaller in overall size and has darker plumage with white collar limited to chin and throat.

== Behaviour and ecology ==
Males are monogamous. They breed on steep cliffs during summer with a clutch of 10 to 11 eggs. In studies conducted in upper Beas Valley, cheer pheasant was found to be sensitive to human disturbance.

== Habitat and distribution ==
The cheer pheasant is distributed in the highlands and scrublands of the Himalayas region of India, Nepal and Pakistan. They are found mainly in western Nepal, Uttarakhand (Kumaon and Garhwal), Himachal Pradesh (Shimla, Kullu and Chamba), and Jammu and Kashmir in northwestern India, and Hazara division, Khyber Pakhtunkhwa in northern Pakistan. Surveys in 1981 and 2003 in the Dhorpatan area of western Nepal established 70 calling sites, suggesting substantial numbers exist in this area (about 200 birds). In another survey in 2010, cheer pheasants were detected in 21 calling sites in Kullu district of Himachal Pradesh. They are found mainly above 6000 feet altitude and up to 10000 feet in summer.

== Status and conservation ==
Due to ongoing habitat loss, small population size, and hunting in some areas, the cheer pheasant is evaluated as vulnerable on the IUCN Red List of Threatened Species. It is listed on Appendix I of CITES. Attempts to reintroduce captive-bred cheer pheasants in Pakistan have been unsuccessful.

== Gallery ==
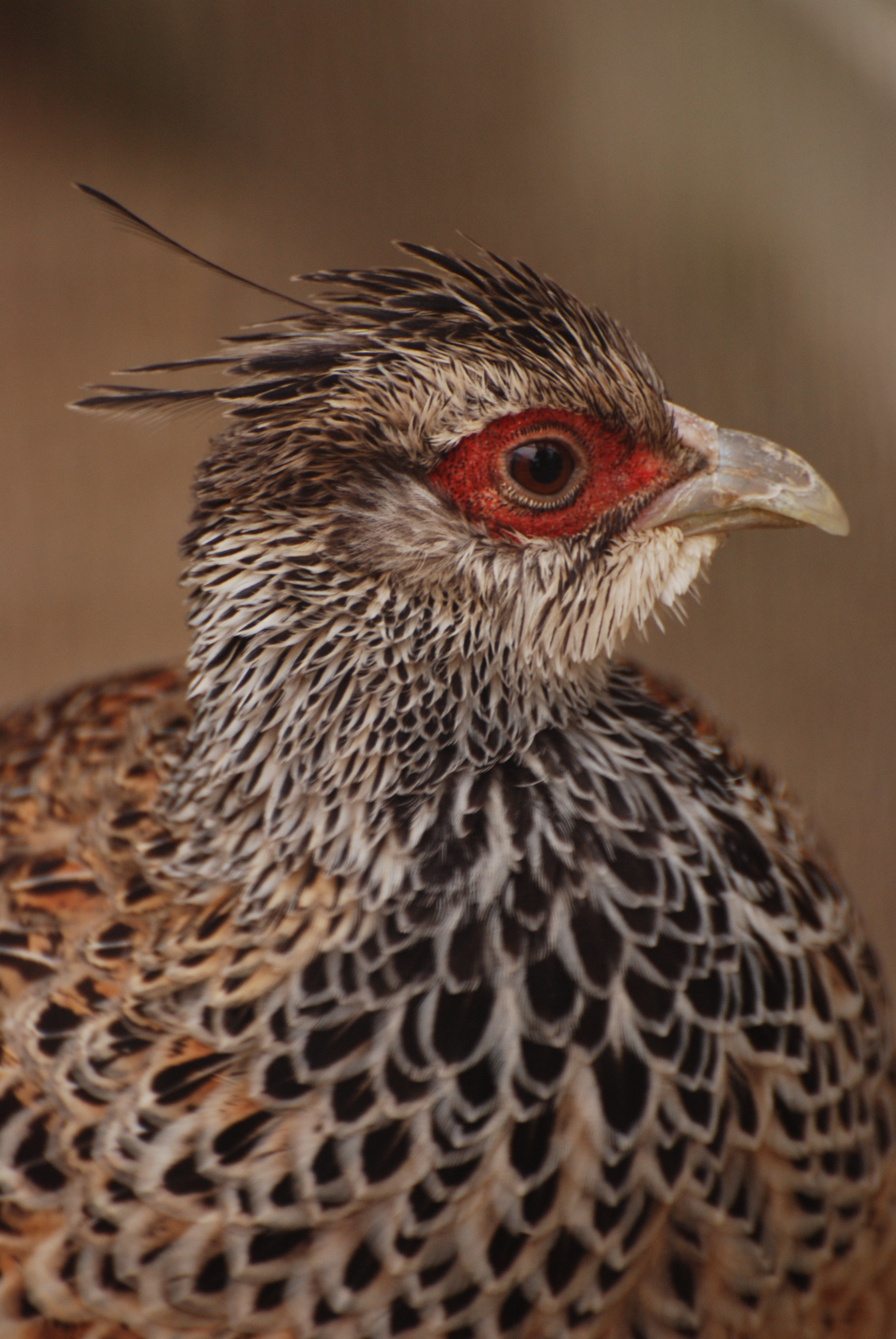
a female at Kyoto Zoo, Japan

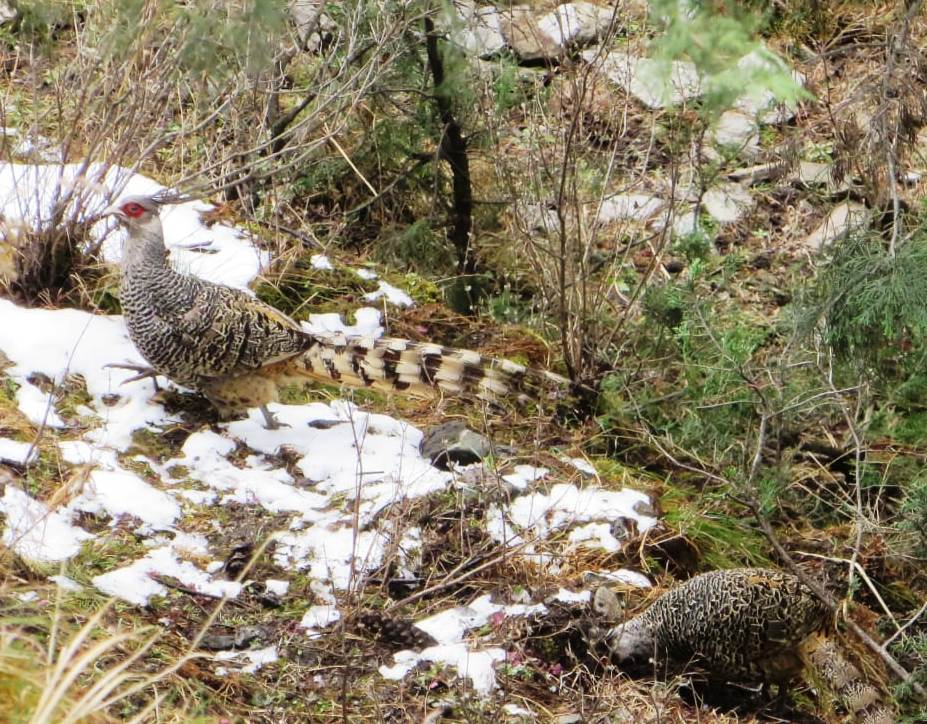
Pair of cheer pheasants near winter Lata village on the periphery of Nanda Devi National Park

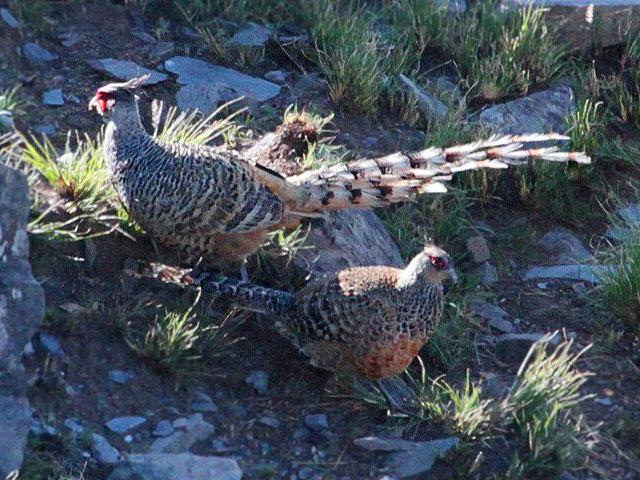
Cheer pheasant pair from Uttarakhand, India, in the Himalayas

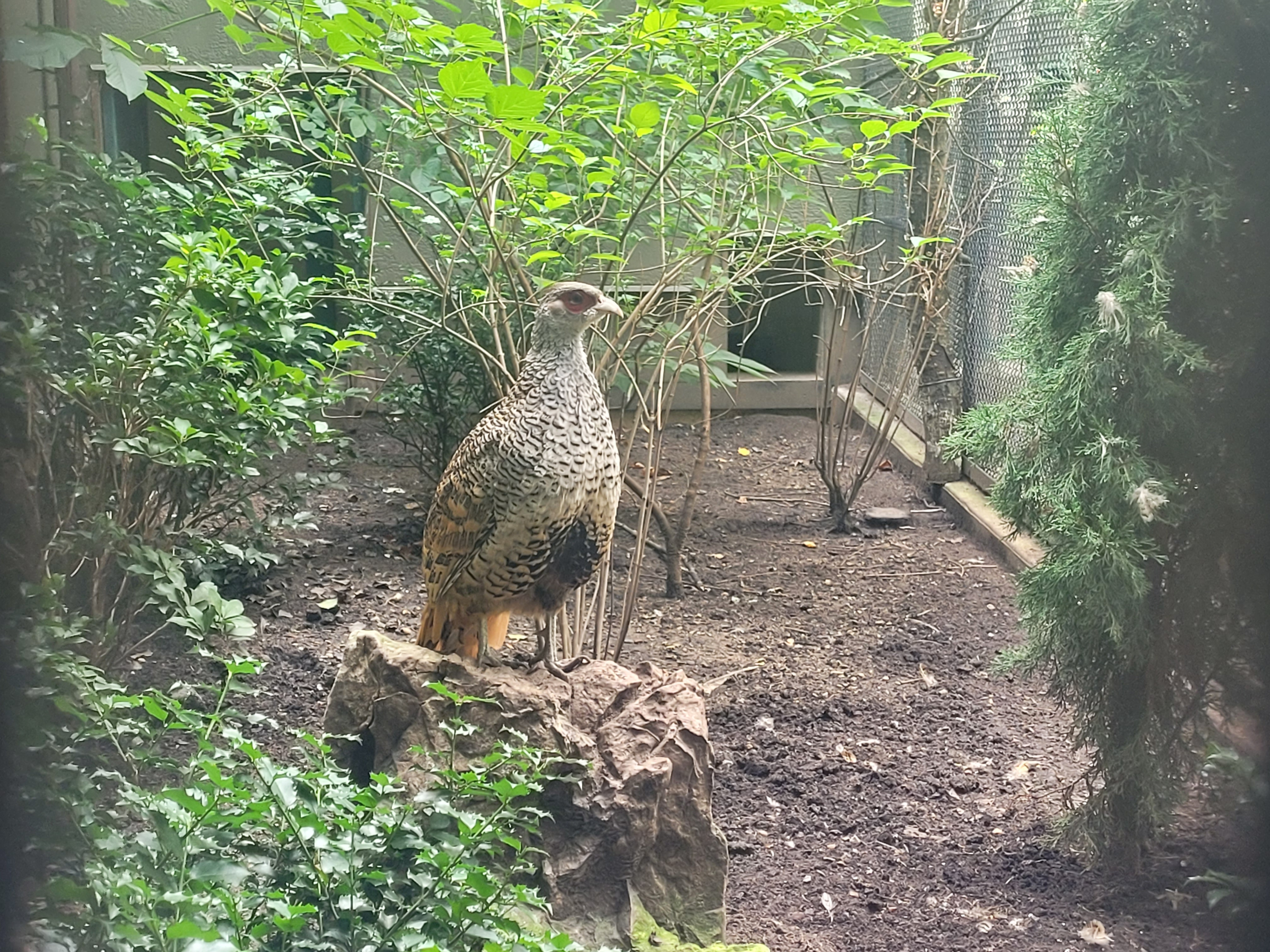
A cheer pheasant in captivity at the Bronx Zoo

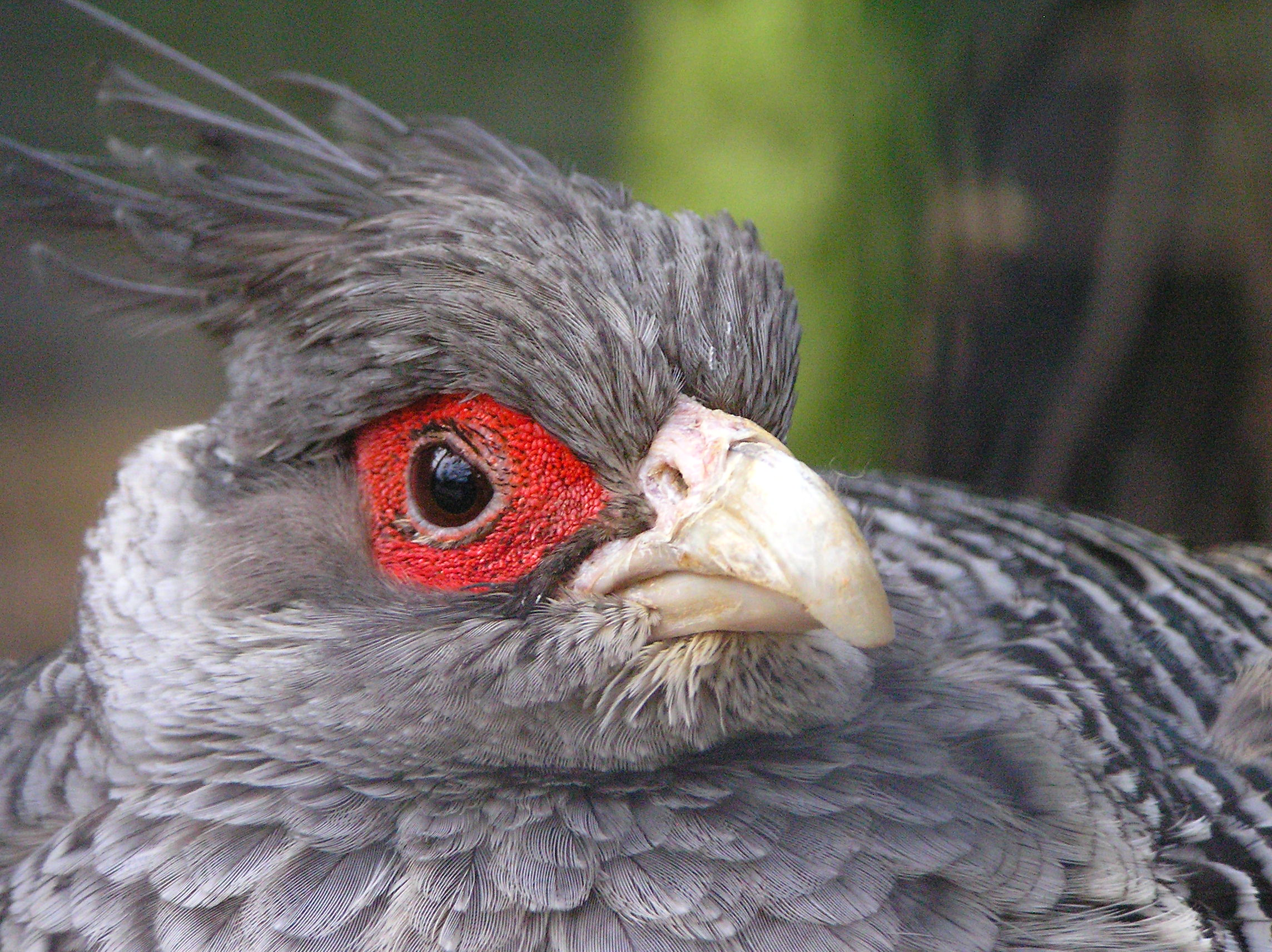
A close-up at the Antwerp Zoo

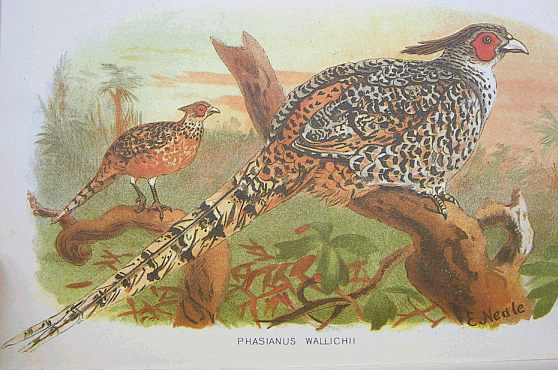
Painting from Hume and Marshall, 1880: Gamebirds of India, Burma, Ceylon
