= Dhullu Baskot =

Dhullu Baskot धुल्लु बास्कोट
- Village development committee
- Location in Nepal Dhullu Baskot (Nepal)
- Coordinates: 28.14°N 83.52°E
- Country: Nepal
- Zone: Dhaulagiri Zone
- District: Baglung District

Population
  - Religions: Hindu
- Time zone: UTC+5:45 (Nepal Time)

Dhullu Baskot is a village development committee in Baglung District in the Dhaulagiri Zone of central Nepal.
