= Galkot =

Coordinates: 28°12′N 83°25′E

Galkot गल्कोट
- Municipality
- Location in Nepal Galkot (Nepal)
- Country: Nepal
- Province: Gandaki Province
- District: Baglung District

Government
  - Type: Mayor–council
  - Mayor: Bharat Sharma
  - Deputy Mayor: Phum Badhur Neuray

Area
  - Total: 194.39 km^{2} (75.05 sq mi)

Population (2020)
  - Total: 39,277
  - Density: 202.05/km^{2} (523.31/sq mi)
- Time zone: UTC+5:45 (NST)

Galkot (Nepali: गल्कोट) is a municipality in Baglung district of Gandaki province of Nepal. It consists of several VDCs. Nearby cities include Gulmi and Pokhara. Its geographic coordinates are 28°13'24"N 83°25'29"E.

It was one of the Chaubisi rajya that existed before unification of Nepal initiated by Prithvi Narayan Shah. It is around 25 km far in the South-Western direction from the headquarter of Baglung district. Today the blacktopped road connects the headquarter to the rural areas of Galkot.

== Geography ==
Galkot is located in the mid-region of Baglung district, which itself is located in Gandaki Province, Nepal.

The region is surrounded by:

- East: Baglung Municipality
- West: Burtibang
- North: Myagdi District
- South: Gulmi District

== Geography and Climate ==
Climate Zone	Elevation Range	% of Area
Upper Tropical	300 to 1,000 meters 1,000 to 3,300 ft.	2.8%
Subtropical	1,000 to 2,000 meters 3,300 to 6,600 ft.	37.1%
Temperate	2,000 to 3,000 meters 6,400 to 9,800 ft.	39.4%
Sub-Alpine	3,000 to 4,000 meters 9,800 to 13,000 ft.	18.6%
Alpine	4,000 to 5,000 meters 13,000 to 16,500 ft.	2.1%

== Demographics ==
The total population is 73,595 out of which 33,215 are males and 40,480 are females living in 14,367 households. The majority of the people in this region are Magars, kshetris, Brahmins and Dalits.

== Economy ==
The majority of population depend upon agriculture and livestock for living. Besides, many people have fled abroad for employment. It is the highest remittance generating region in the country. It is also the commercial and transit hub of the headquarters and western districts. People have started to use modern and commercial farming techniques. There are some attractive places in Galkot which is helping promote tourism, due to which hospitality industry is also contributing to its economy.

== Education ==
By 2060, Galkot had 14 secondary schools, 2 Boarding Schools and 2 higher secondary schools, the oldest one being Galkot Higher Secondary School (Established: 2008 Chaitra 8 BS). The numbers have increased significantly now. However, many students go to nearby headquarter, Pokhara, Kathmandu or abroad to pursue their studies.

== Administration ==
Galkot Municipaluty consists of 11 Wards These are as follows:

- Galkot Municipality Ward No 1 Dudilabhati
- Galkot Municipality Ward No 2 Narethanti
- Galkot Municipality Ward No 3 Hatiya
- Galkot Municipality Ward No 4 Kharuwa
- Galkot Municipality Ward No 5 Harichaur
- Galkot Municipality Ward No 6 Charaudi
- Galkot Municipality Ward No 7 Malma
- Galkot Municipality Ward No 9 Timurbot
- Galkot Municipality Ward No 8 Kandebaas
- Galkot Municipality Ward No 10 Pandavkhani
- Galkot Municipality Ward No 11 Righa

== See also ==
- Zones of Nepal (Former)
- Baglung
- Burtibang
- Chaubisi rajya
