= Malma, Nepal =

Malma मल्म
- Village development committee
- Location in Nepal Malma (Nepal)
- Coordinates: 28.22°N 83.38°E
- Country: Nepal
- Zone: Dhaulagiri Zone
- District: Baglung District

Population (1991)
  - Total: 4,738
  - Religions: Hindu
- Time zone: UTC+5:45 (Nepal Time)

Malma is a village development committee in Baglung District in the Dhaulagiri Zone of central Nepal. At the time of the 1991 Nepal census it had a population of 4,738 and had 881 houses in the town.
