= Tangram, Nepal =

Tangram तंग्राम
- Village development committee
- Location in Nepal Tangram (Nepal)
- Coordinates: 28.28°N 83.50°E
- Country: Nepal
- Zone: Dhaulagiri Zone
- District: Baglung District

Population (2001)
  - Total: 3,907
  - Religions: Hindu
- Time zone: UTC+5:45 (Nepal Time)

Tangram is a village development committee in Baglung District in the Dhaulagiri Zone of central Nepal. At the time of the 2001 Nepal census it had a population of 3,907 (2,121 females and 1,786 males) and had 740 houses in the village.
