= Binamare =

Binamare बिनामारे
- Village development committee
- Location in Nepal Binamare (Nepal)
- Coordinates: 28.17°N 83.63°E
- Country: Nepal
- Zone: Dhaulagiri Zone
- District: Baglung District

Population (1991)
  - Total: 2,288
  - Religions: Hindu
- Time zone: UTC+5:45 (Nepal Time)

Binamare is a village development committee in Baglung District in the Dhaulagiri Zone of central Nepal. At the time of the 1991 Nepal census it had a population of 2,288 and had 467 houses in the village.
