= Dhorpatan Hunting Reserve =

Hunting Reserve of Nepal

- Nepali: ढोरपाटन शिकार आरक्ष
- IUCN category VI (protected area with sustainable use of natural resources)
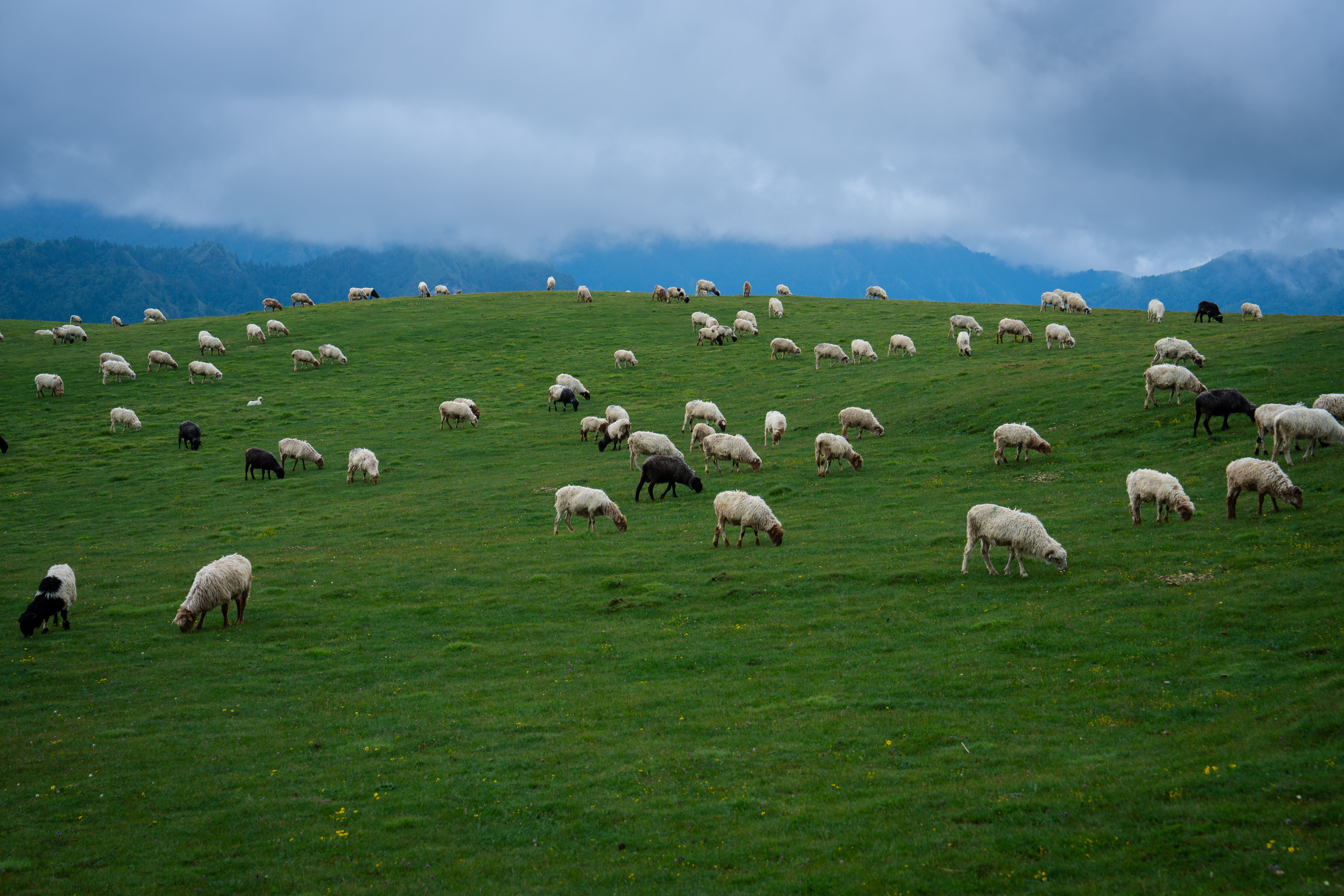

- Location within Gandaki Province Location within Lumbini Province Location within Nepal Location within South Asia
- Location: Nepal
- Coordinates: 28°38′26″N 82°59′40″E
- Area: 1,325 km^{2} (512 sq mi)
- Established: 1987
- Governing body: Department of National Parks and Wildlife Conservation

Dhorpatan Hunting Reserve is a protected area in Nepal and the country's only reserve where regulated sport hunting is permitted. Located in the Dhaulagiri Himal of western Nepal across the Eastern Rukum, Myagdi, and Baglung Districts, it covers 1,325 km^{2} (512 sq mi) and ranges in elevation from 2,850 to 5,500 m (9,350 to 18,040 ft). The reserve was initially established in 1983 and formally gazetted in 1987, with a dual mandate to permit controlled trophy hunting while conserving a representative high-altitude ecosystem of western Nepal, distinguishing it from Nepal's national parks, where hunting is prohibited.

== History ==
The reserve's headquarters town, Dhorpatan, was selected in the early 1960s as one of four sites where the government of Nepal, working with the Nepal Red Cross Society and UNHCR funding, resettled Tibetan refugees following the 1959 uprising in Tibet; a small Tibetan settlement remains in the valley alongside the indigenous Kham Magar population.

During the Nepalese Civil War (1996–2006), Maoist insurgents launched their "People's War" from the neighbouring Rolpa and Rukum districts and seized control of Dhorpatan Hunting Reserve within weeks of the conflict's start, using it as one of several protected areas across rural Nepal that functioned as rebel sanctuaries and revenue sources during the insurgency.

== Geography ==
The reserve lies in the Dhaulagiri Himal, bordered to the north by the Putha, Churen, and Gurja Himal peaks. It is drained westward by the Uttar Ganga River, a tributary of the Bheri River, itself a tributary of the Karnali River. For management purposes, the reserve is divided into several hunting blocks; flat, marshy alpine meadows above the treeline, locally called patans, are a defining feature of the landscape and important grazing habitat for blue sheep and other herbivores. More than half the reserve's area, mostly at higher elevations, is pastureland.

== Biodiversity ==
The reserve spans alpine, subalpine, and high-temperate vegetation zones. Common tree species include fir (Abies), birch (Betula utilis), spruce (Picea), and juniper, with rhododendron and oak at lower elevations. Other animals found include the snow leopard and cheer pheasant.

The reserve's most significant mammal is the blue sheep (Pseudois nayaur), also called bharal or naur, the reserve's principal hunting quarry and prey base for snow leopards. A 2025 study found the reserve's blue sheep population declined sharply from 2,593 individuals in 1979 to 1,290 in 2021, with the young-to-female recruitment ratio falling from 83 to 37 over the same period. Other mammals recorded in the reserve include the Himalayan tahr, goral, serow, red fox, wolf, and red panda, the last of which has been studied for its summer diet and habitat use in the reserve's temperate forests.

The reserve is designated an Important Bird Area by BirdLife International.

=== Snow leopard monitoring ===
In May 2026, reserve authorities began a camera trap survey to estimate the local snow leopard population, the first initiative of its kind in the reserve. Three technical teams installed 56 camera traps across six hunting blocks at elevations between 3,200 and 5,500 m (10,500 and 18,000 ft) in Baglung, Myagdi and Rukum districts, and they also collect scat samples for laboratory analysis and examining prey remains.

== Trophy hunting ==
Dhorpatan is the only reserve in Nepal where sport hunting is legally permitted, restricted to two species: blue sheep and Himalayan tahr. Hunting permits are issued by the Department of National Parks and Wildlife Conservation under a seasonal quota system, typically during the spring and autumn. The reserve's management has faced financial strain: over six fiscal years from 2017/18 to 2022/23, average annual management costs exceeded trophy-hunting revenue by roughly US$322,500. Researchers have described the long-term ecological sustainability of the current hunting regime as contested, citing the recorded decline in the blue sheep population and its demographic structure.

== People ==
Approximately 2,945 families, or around 24,472 people, live in and around the reserve, in the districts of Myagdi, Baglung, and Eastern Rukum, predominantly from the indigenous Magar and Chantyal communities, alongside Dalit and Nauthar households. Local communities depend on the reserve for timber, fuelwood, fodder, and pasture. A 2022 report examined the impact of hunting-reserve and national-park designations on indigenous peoples' land and resource rights in Nepal, including at Dhorpatan.
