= Mulpani, Baglung =

Mulpani मूलपानी
- Village development committee
- Country: Nepal
- Zone: Dhaulagiri Zone
- District: Baglung District

Population (1991)
  - Total: 4,442
  - Religions: Hindu
- Time zone: UTC+5:45 (Nepal Time)

Mulpani is a village development committee in Baglung District in the Dhaulagiri Zone of central Nepal. At the time of the 1991 Nepal census it had a population of 4,442 and had 846 houses in the town.
