= Sunkhani, Baglung =

Sunkhani सुनखानी
- Village development committee
- Country: Nepal
- Zone: Dhaulagiri Zone
- District: Baglung District

Population
  - Religions: Hindu
- Time zone: UTC+5:45 (Nepal Time)

Sunkhani is a village development committee in Baglung District in the Dhaulagiri Zone of central Nepal.
