= Dhorpatan =

- Municipality
- Location in Nepal Dhorpatan (Nepal)
- Country: Nepal
- Province: Gandaki Province
- District: Baglung District

Government
  - Mayor: Dev Kumar Nepali
  - Deputy Mayor: Karmati Magar

Area
  - Total: 222.85 km^{2} (86.04 sq mi)

Population
  - Total: 26,215
  - Density: 117.64/km^{2} (304.67/sq mi)
  - Religions: Hindu Buddhism
- Time zone: UTC+5:45 (NST)
- Website: dhorpatanmun.gov.np

Dhorpatan is a municipality in Nepal's Baglung District, 3,900 meters elevation in an east–west valley south of the Dhaulagiri mountain range in the Himalayas. It is the headquarters of Dhorpatan Hunting Reserve. There is a small community of indigenous Kham Magar people as well as Tibetan refugees.

The enclosing valley is drained to the west by the Uttar Ganga, tributary of the Bheri River, which in turn joins the Karnali River. The east–west orientation of Dhorpatan Valley offers an easy—by himalayan standards—route between the Karnali basin of western Nepal and the Gandaki River basin in the center, over a 3,400-meter pass on the watershed 18 km east of the town. This was an historic migration route for Khas people eastward in the late Middle Ages. Ensuing political evolution led to the unification of the Kingdom of Nepal from loose confederations in the Karnali and Gandaki' regions and from other confederations further east.

A seasonal STOL airstrip 1 km to the west serves the valley. Dhorpatan can also be reached from Baglung via Burtibang by bus or jeep, and by jeep from Beni via Myagdi Khola. Dolpa is a few days trek to the north around the western Dhaulagiri range. There are a few homestay lodges serving basic food, tea, coffee and milk. Cottages are available for hunters holding entry and hunting permits. During the summer months large herds of livestock are taken northwards from the Rapti Zone by Kham Magar people for grazing in surrounding pastureland. Animal husbandry, handicrafts and some tourism are the key economic activities of the people in the region.

== Demographics ==
At the time of the 2011 Nepal census, Dhorpatan Municipality had a population of 26,438. of these, 95.6% spoke Nepali, 2.0% Magar, 1.5% Chantyal, 0.3% Kham, 0.1% Maithili, 0.1% Thakali and 0.1% other languages as their first language.

In terms of ethnicity/caste, 39.3% were Kami, 22.6% Magar, 16.9% Chhantyal, 8.9% Hill Brahmin, 3.0% Damai/Dholi, 2.5% Chhantyal, 2.0% Kumal, 1.1% Kayastha, 0.5% Sarki, 0.5% Thakali, 0.4% Musalman, 0.4% Sanyasi/Dasnami, 0.3% other Dalit, 0.3% Gurung, 0.3% Newar, 0.2% Gharti/Bhujel, 0.2% Thakuri, 0.1% Tamang, 0.1% other Terai and 0.2% others.

In terms of religion, 91.1% were Hindu, 5.6% Buddhist, 1.0% Christian, 0.7% Prakriti, 0.4% Muslim and 1.1% others.

In terms of literacy, 63.0% could read and write, 2.9% could only read and 33.9% could neither read nor write.

== Tourism ==
Domestic tourism to Dhorpatan has increased substantially in the 2020s. According to the Dhorpatan Hunting Reserve Office, tourist arrivals increased from 3,020 in fiscal year 2076/77 (2019/20) to 6,703 in 2077/78 (2020/21), 9,919 in 2078/79 (2021/22), 7,645 in 2079/80 (2022/23), 15,573 in 2080/81 (2023/24), 23,692 in 2081/82 (2024/25), and 37,520 in 2082/83 (2025/26).

Most visitors are Nepali domestic tourists. In fiscal year 2082/83, 37,270 of the 37,520 visitors were Nepali, while 250 were foreign visitors, including 12 from SAARC countries and 213 from other countries in the previous fiscal year.

Reserve officials have attributed the increase in visitors to improved tourism infrastructure, promotional activities, and the development of hotels and homestays in Dhorpatan Valley. Around two dozen hotels and homestays were reported to be operating in the valley in 2025. Domestic tourists visit Dhorpatan Valley, the Nisheldhor and Dhorbarah temples, and the high pastures of Bukipatan and Jaljala, while foreign visitors have historically visited the reserve mainly for licensed sport hunting.
