= Devisthan, Baglung =

Coordinates: 28°21′N 83°5′E

Devisthan देवीस्थान
- Village development committee
- Location in Nepal Devisthan (Nepal)
- Country: Nepal
- Zone: Dhaulagiri Zone
- District: Baglung District

Population (1991)
  - Total: 6,151
  - Religions: Hindu
- Time zone: UTC+5:45 (Nepal Time)

Devisthan is a village development committee in Baglung District in the Dhaulagiri Zone of central Nepal. At the time of the 1991 Nepal census it had a population of 6,151 and had 1247 houses in the town.
