= Bareng Rural Municipality =

Bareng Rural Municipality वरेङ गाउँपालिका
- Gaunpalika
- Location in Nepal
- Coordinates: 28.136505°N 83.498285°E
- Country: Nepal
- Province: Gandaki
- District: Baglung District

Government
  - गाउँपालिका अध्यक्ष: कृष्ण प्रसाद शर्मा

Population
  - Total: राष्ट्रिय जनगणना २०७८ अनुसार जम्मा जनसंख्या : १११५८
- Time zone: UTC+5:45 (Nepal Time)
- Website: http://barengmun.gov.np

Bareng Rural Municipality (Bareng Gaupalika) (Nepali: वरेङ गाउँपालिका) is a Gaunpalika in Baglung District in Gandaki Province of Nepal. It is located in the southern part of the baglung district. On 12 March 2017, the government of Nepal implemented a new local administrative structure, in which VDCs have been replaced with municipal and Village Councils. Bareng is one of these 753 local units.
