= Lekhani, Baglung =

Coordinates: 28°15′N 83°31′E

Lekhani लेखानी
- Village Development Committee
- Location in Nepal Lekhani (Nepal)
- Country: Nepal
- Zone: Dhaulagiri Zone
- District: Baglung District

Population (1991)
  - Total: 2,431
  - Religions: Hindu
- Time zone: UTC+5:45 (Nepal Time)

Lekhani is a village, ward number 8, of Kathehola Rural municipality formerly known as Village Development Committee in Baglung District in the Dhaulagiri Zone of central Nepal. At the time of the 1991 Nepal census it had a population of 2,431 and had 507 houses in the village.
