= Khathekhola Rural Municipality =

Kathekhola Rural Municipality काठेखोला गाउँपालिका
- Gaunpalika
- Location in Nepal
- Coordinates: 28.518619°N 84.358768°E
- Country: Nepal
- Province: Gandaki
- District: Baglung District
- Wards: 8

Government
  - Type: Rural Municipality
  - Chairman: Raju Thapa

Area
  - Total: 82.88 km^{2} (32.00 sq mi)

Population
  - Total: 22,526
  - Density: 271.8/km^{2} (703.9/sq mi)
  - Households: 5,892
- Time zone: UTC+5:45 (Nepal Time)
- Area code: 33303
- Website: http://kathekholamun.gov.np/

Kathekhola Rural Municipality (Kathekhola Gaupalika) (Nepali: काठेखोला गाउँपालिका) is a Gaunpalika in Baglung District in Gandaki Province of Nepal. On 12 March 2017, the government of Nepal implemented a new local administrative structure, in which VDCs have been replaced with municipal and Village Councils. Kathekhola is one of these 753 local units. It is named after the Kathekhola River, a geographical trademark of this rural municipality. Madhyapahari Lokmarg passes through the central part of this rural municipality and is also close to Baglung district headquarters.

== Administration ==
Kathekhola Rural Municipality (Kathekhola Gaupalika) consists of 8 wards. All of those ward has their name but typically the locals use numbers to refer the ward.

1. Pala (पाला)
2. Bhimpokhara (भिमापोखरा)
3. Dhamja (धाम्जा)
4. Tangram (तंग्राम)
5. Bihu (बिहुँ)
6. Bihu (बिहुँ)
7. Resha (रेश)
8. Lekhani (लेखानी)

== Gallery ==
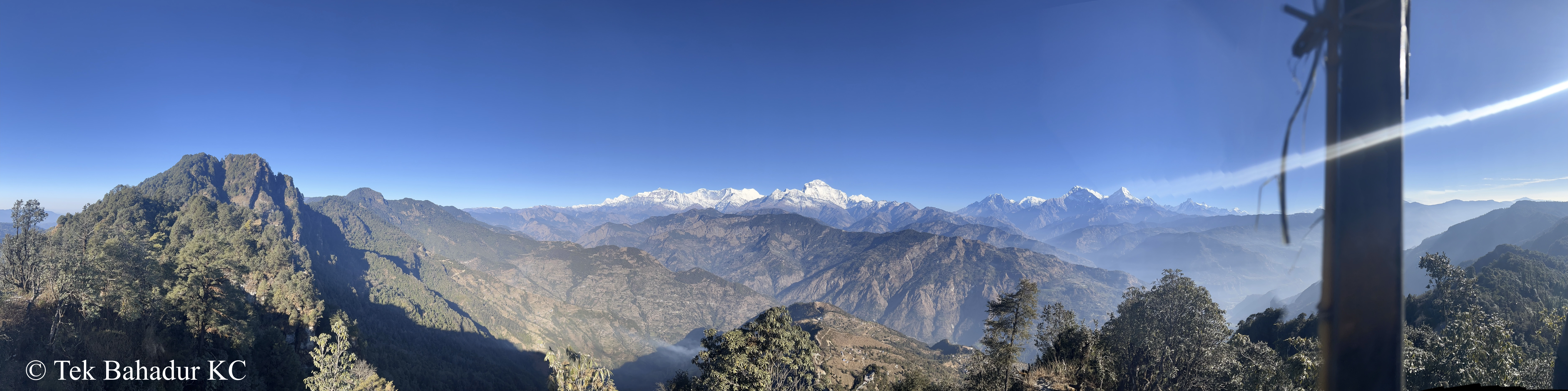
A view of the Himalayas as seen from Beldhunga

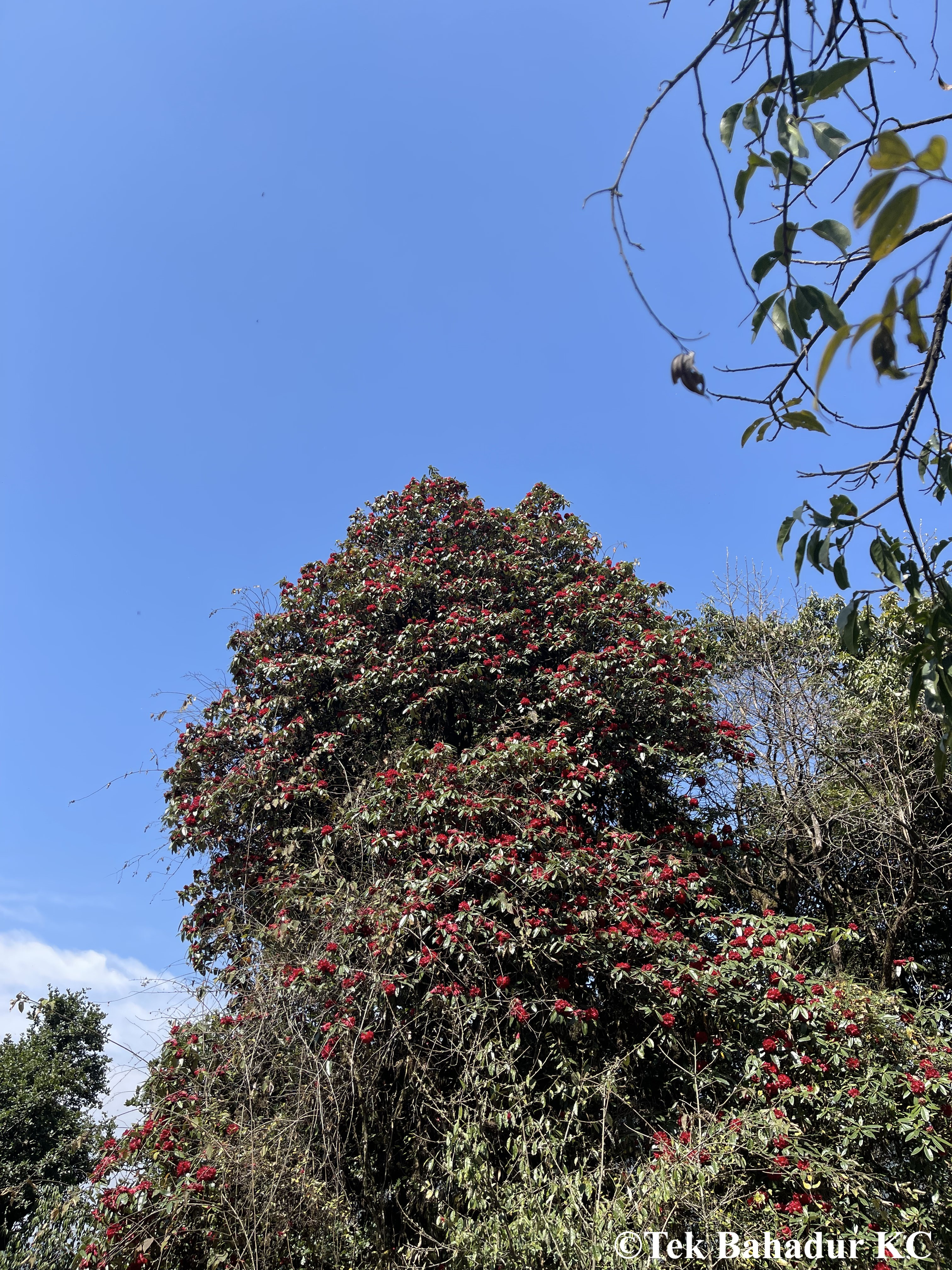
Rhododendrons blossoming in the hills of Kathekhola

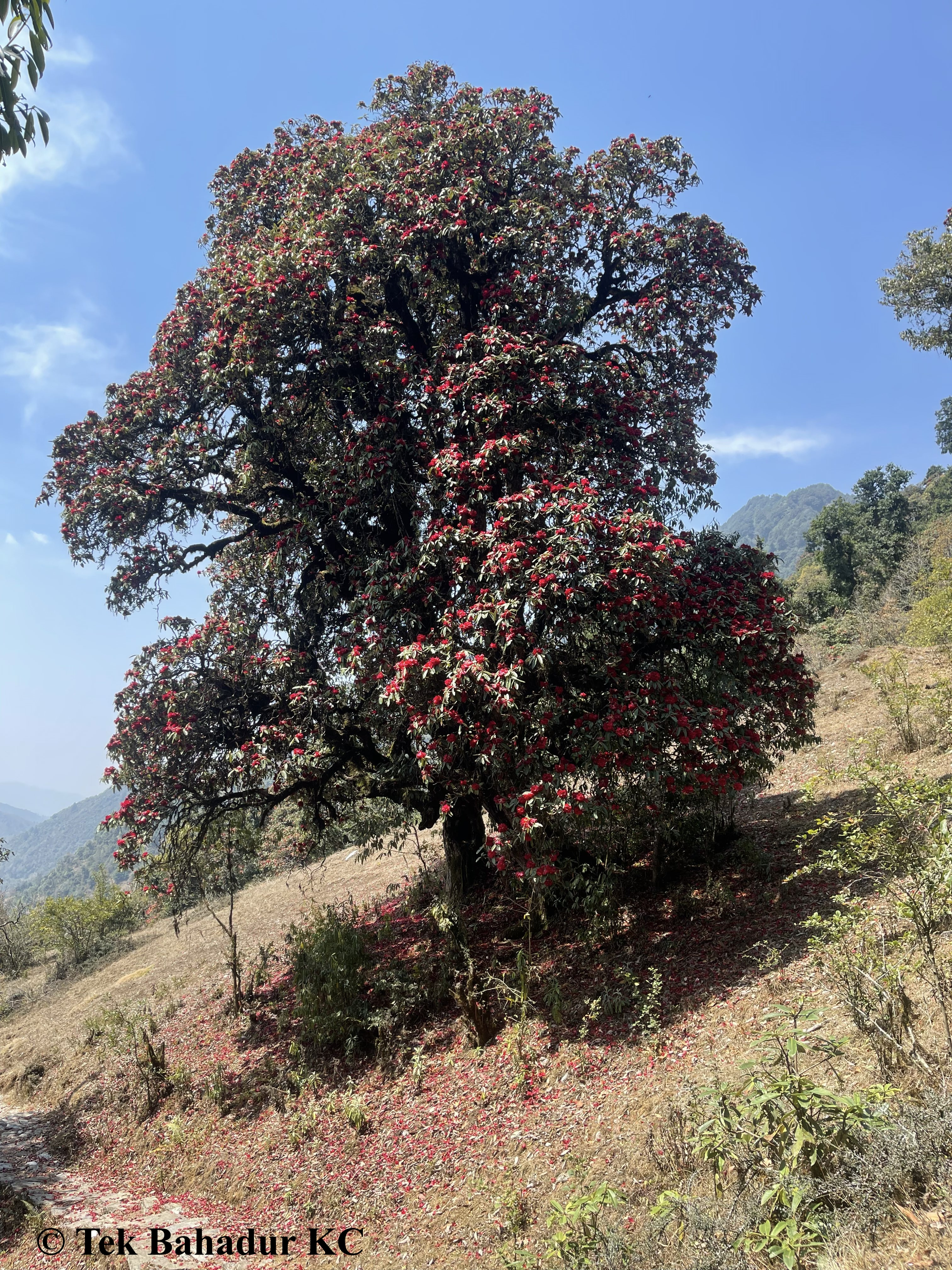
Rhododendrons in the hills of Kathekhola
