= Khunga, Baglung =

Coordinates: 28°22′N 83°12′E

Khunga खुङ्गा
- Village Development Committee
- Location in Nepal Khunga (Nepal)
- Country: Nepal
- Zone: Dhaulagiri Zone
- District: Baglung District

Population (1991)
  - Total: 2,926
  - Religions: Hindu
- Time zone: UTC+5:45 (Nepal Time)

Khunga is a Village Development Committee in Baglung District in the Dhaulagiri Zone of central Nepal. At the time of the 1991 Nepal census it had a population of 2,926 and had 583 houses in the town.
