= Arjewa =

Arjewa अर्जेवा
- Village development committee
- Location in Nepal Arjewa (Nepal)
- Coordinates: 28°9′0″N 83°37′48″E
- Country: Nepal
- Zone: Dhaulagiri Zone
- District: Baglung District

Population
  - Religions: Hindu
- Time zone: UTC+5:45 (Nepal Time)

Arjewa is a village development committee in Baglung District in the Dhaulagiri Zone of central Nepal.
