= Jaidi, Nepal =

Coordinates: 28°08′N 83°36′E

Jidi is a Village Development Committee in Baglung District in Gandaki Province of central Nepal.
