= Kusmishera =

Kushmishera कुश्मीशेरा, JAIMINI GUFA, JAIMINI TOPSTHAN.
- Village development committee
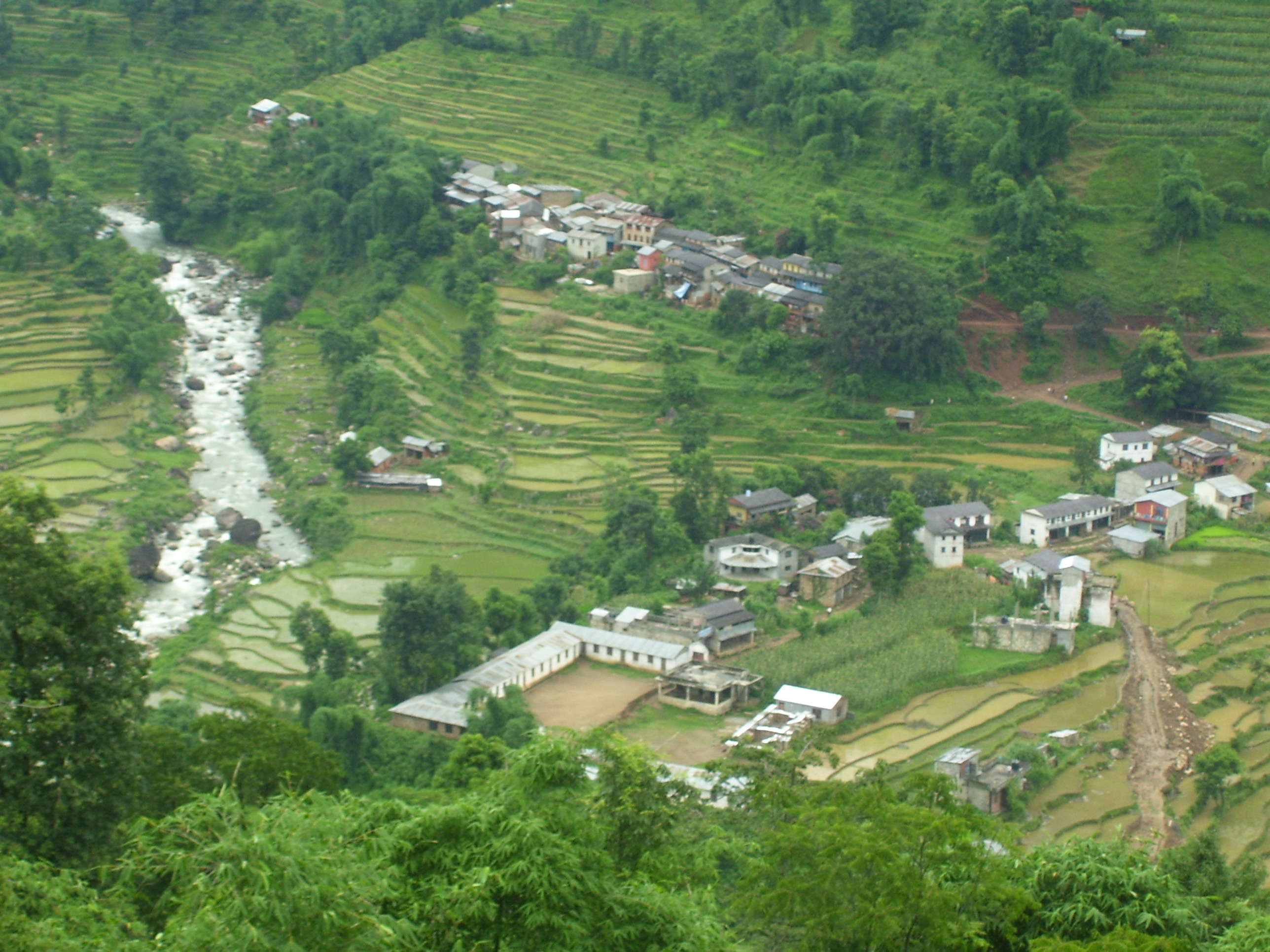

- Location in Nepal Kushmishera (Nepal)
- Coordinates: 28.20°N 83.62°E
- Country: Nepal
- Zone: Dhaulagiri Zone
- District: Baglung District

Population (1991)
  - Total: 2,944
  - Religions: Hindu Buddhism Animism Shamanism
- Time zone: UTC+5:45 (Nepal Time)

Kushmishera is a village development committee in the Baglung District in the Dhaulagiri Zone of central Nepal. At the time of the 1991 Nepal census it had a population of 2,944 and had 570 houses in the town.
