= Rangkhani =

Rangkhani राङखानी
- Village development committee
- Location in Nepal Rangkhani (Nepal)
- Coordinates: 28.15°N 83.56°E
- Country: Nepal
- Zone: Dhaulagiri Zone
- District: Baglung District

Population (1991)
  - Total: 3,981
  - Religions: Hindu
- Time zone: UTC+5:45 (Nepal Time)

Rangkhani is a village development committee in Baglung District in the Dhaulagiri Zone of central Nepal. At the time of the 1991 Nepal census it had a population of 3,981 and had 791 houses in the town.
