= Damek, Nepal =

Coordinates: 28°12′N 83°36′E

Damek, Nepal दामेक
- Village development committee
- Location in Nepal Damek, Nepal (Nepal)
- Country: Nepal
- Zone: Dhaulagiri Zone
- District: Baglung District

Population (1991)
  - Total: 5,824
  - Religions: Hindu
- Time zone: UTC+5:45 (Nepal Time)

Damek is a village development committee (VDC) in Baglung District in the Dhaulagiri Zone of central Nepal. At the time of the 1991 Nepal census it had a population of 5,824 and had 1072 houses in the town.

Damek is the largest VDC in Baglung District. It is situated in a hilly area.
