= Baglung District =

Coordinates: 28°16′N 83°36′E

Baglung District बागलुङ जिल्ला
- District
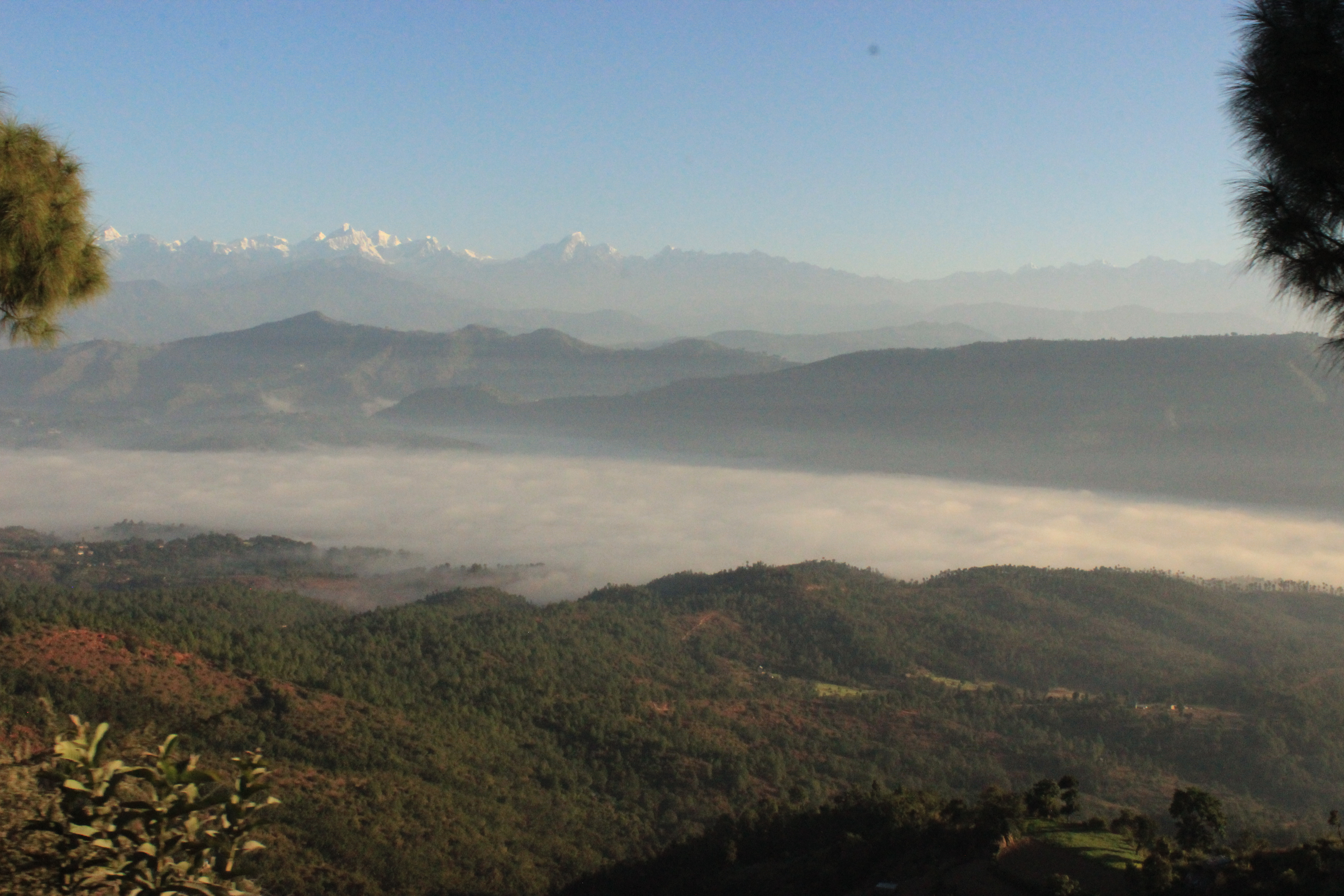
- Himalayas from Bhakunde

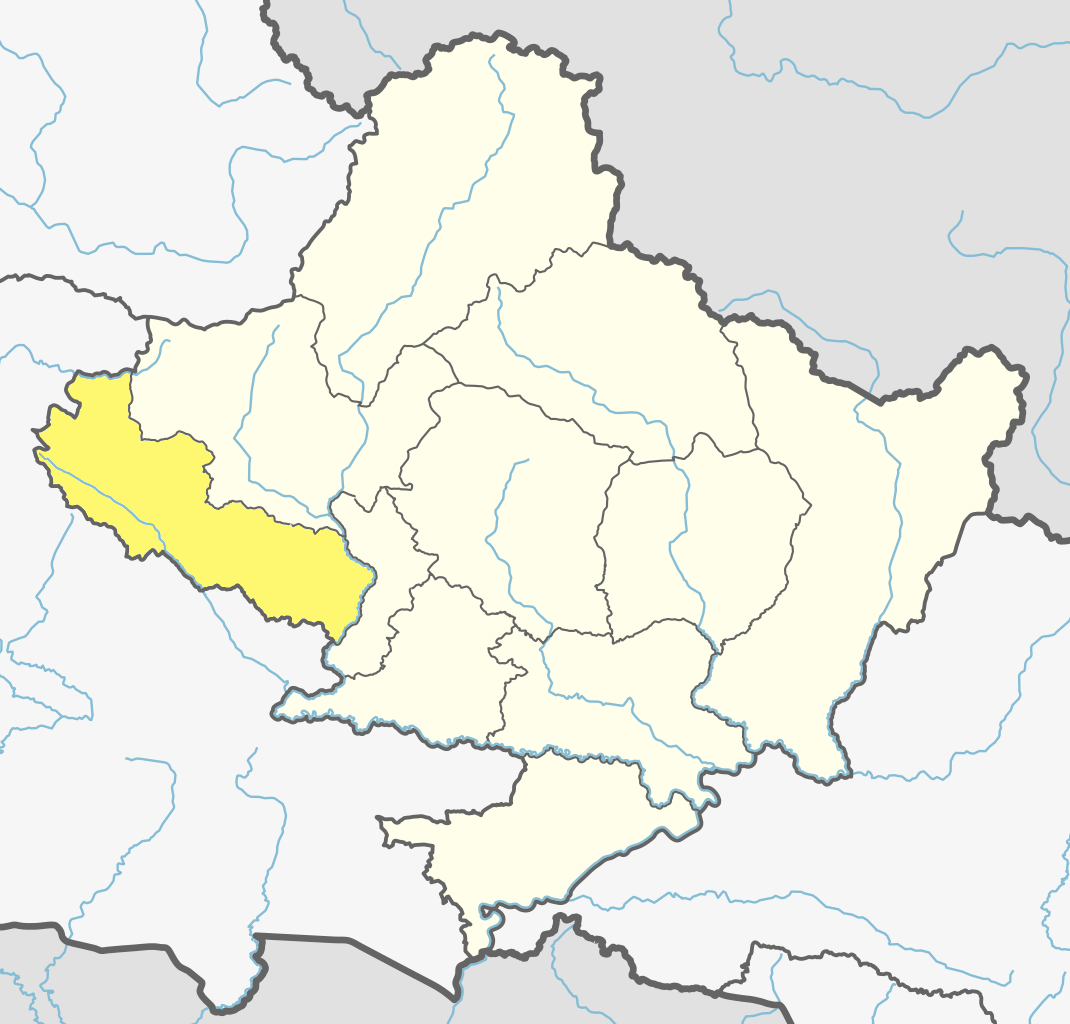
- Location of Baglung (dark yellow) in Gandaki Province
- Interactive map of Baglung District
- Country: Nepal
- Province: Gandaki Province
- Admin HQ.: Baglung

Government
  - Type: Coordination committee
  - Body: DCC, Baglung

Area
  - Total: 1,784 km^{2} (689 sq mi)

Population (2021)
  - Total: 249,211
  - Density: 139.7/km^{2} (361.8/sq mi)
- Time zone: UTC+05:45 (NPT)
- Telephone Code: 068
- Main Language(s): Nepali
- Website: Official Website

Baglung District (Nepali: बागलुङ जिल्ला pronounced [baɡluŋ]), a part of Gandaki Province, is one of the seventy-seven districts of Nepal. The district, with Baglung as its district headquarters, covers an area of 1,784 km^{2} (689 sq mi) and has a population (2011) of 268,613.

== Introduction ==
Baglung is surrounded by Parbat, Myagdi, Rukum, Rolpa, Pyuthan and Gulmi districts. It has 59 Village Development Committees and one Municipality. Baglung has the moniker "District of suspension bridges" as there are numerous suspension bridges. It is a hilly district, and most of the population settled on the sides of the rivers. Fertile plains situated on either side of the rivers are used for farming. The headquarters of Baglung District is Baglung Municipality which is located on a plateau overlooking the holy Kali Gandaki. Like Nepal, Baglung is also diverse in religion, culture, ethnicity, altitude, temperature etc. Hinduism and Buddhism are the major religions here.

Baglung is rich in herbal medicinal plants. Rice, Corn, Millet, Wheat and Potato are the major crops of Baglung. Small scale mining mostly for Iron and Copper was a major activity in Baglung in the past. However, due to the economics of operating small mines most have closed since. Slate mining remains the most widespread form of mining in present times.

Baglung Municipality, Hatiya- Galkot and Burtibang are the main trading centers of Baglung. Galkot, Kusma and Burtibang are connected by roads with the district headquarters Baglung Bazaar. Baglung is served by the Nepal Electricity Authority and various small local hydropower plants. Recently, the telephone has been accessible in almost all villages in Baglung. Baglung is considered to be one of the politically most conscious districts and it plays a significant role in Nepali politics.

== Geography and climate ==
The highest temperature at the lowest elevation of Baglung rises up to about 37.5 degrees Celsius in summer and the lowest temperature at Dhorpatan falls up to about −15 degrees Celsius in winter. The elevation of Baglung varies from about 650 meters at Kharbang to about 4,300 meters in Dhorpatan.

Climate Zone	Elevation Range	% of Area
Upper Tropical	300 to 1,000 meters 1,000 to 3,300 ft.	2.8%
Subtropical	1,000 to 2,000 meters 3,300 to 6,600 ft.	37.1%
Temperate	2,000 to 3,000 meters 6,400 to 9,800 ft.	39.4%
Subalpine	3,000 to 4,000 meters 9,800 to 13,100 ft.	18.6%
Alpine	4,000 to 5,000 meters 13,100 to 16,400 ft.	2.1%

== Demographics ==
Historical population
Census year	Pop.	±% p.a.
1981	215,228	—
1991	232,486	+0.77%
2001	268,937	+1.47%
2011	268,613	−0.01%
2021	249,211	−0.75%
Source: Citypopulation

At the time of the 2021 Nepal census, Baglung District had a population of 249,211. 8.12% of the population is under 5 years of age. It has a literacy rate of 79.97% and a sex ratio of 1144 females per 1000 males. 513,504 (85.58%) lived in municipalities.

Castes/ethnic groups in Baglung district (2021)
1. Magar (30.0%)
2. Chhetri (18.1%)
3. Kami (17.9%)
4. Bahun (15.3%)
5. Sarki (6.03%)
6. Damai (4.82%)
7. Thakuri (1.59%)
8. Chhantyal (1.35%)
9. Newar (1.04%)
10. Other Hill Janjati (2.66%)
11. Others (1.14%)

Khas people make up 64% of the population, of which Chhetri and Kami are the largest groups. Khas Dalits are 28% of the population. Magars are the single largest ethnicity, making up 30% of the population.

Languages of Baglung district (2021)
1. Nepali (94.2%)
2. Magar (2.30%)
3. Magar Kham (1.80%)
4. Others (1.71%)

At the time of the 2021 census, 94.19% of the population spoke Nepali, 2.30% Magar and 1.80% Magar Kham as their first language. In 2011, 94.2% of the population spoke Nepali as their first language.

Religion in Baglung District (2021)
Religion	Percent
Hinduism	91.31%
Buddhism	4.91%
Prakriti	2.22%
Christianity	1.19%
Other or not stated	0.37%

== Administration ==
The district consists of 10 Municipalities, out of which four are urban municipalities and six are rural municipalities. These are as follows:

- Baglung Municipality (the district's headquarter)
- Dhorpatan Municipality
- Galkot Municipality
- Jaimuni Municipality
- Bareng Rural Municipality
- Khathekhola Rural Municipality
- Taman Khola Rural Municipality
- Tara Khola Rural Municipality
- Nisikhola Rural Municipality
- Badigad Rural Municipality

=== Former Village Development Committees ===
Prior to the restructuring of the district, Baglung consisted of the following municipalities and Village development committees:

- Adhikarichaur
- Amalachaur
- Amarbhumi
- Argal
- Arjewa
- Baglung Municipality
- Baskot
- Batakachaur
- Bhakunde
- Bhimgithe
- Bhimpokhara
- Bihunkot
- Binamare
- Boharagaun
- Bowang
- Bungadovan
- Burtibang
- Chhisti
- Daga Tundada
- Damek
- Darling
- Devisthan
- Dhamja
- Dhullu Baskot
- Jaidi
- Dudilavati
- Gwalichaur-Harichaur
- Hatiya
- Hila
- Hugdishir
- Jaljala
- Kandebas
- Khungkhani
- Khunga
- Kusmishera
- Lekhani
- Malika
- Malma
- Mulpani
- Narayansthan
- Narethanti
- Nisi
- Paiyunthanthap
- Palakot
- Pandavkhani
- Paiyunpata
- Rajkut
- Ranasingkiteni
- Rangkhani
- Rayadanda
- Resha
- Righa
- Salyan
- Sarkuwa
- Singana
- Sisakhani
- Sukhaura
- Sunkhani
- Taman
- Tangram
- Tara
- Tityang

== 2015 Nepal earthquake ==
The district was moderately affected by an April 2015 Nepal earthquake. Many old buildings sustained damage and a few collapsed. Since then many of the buildings have been rebuilt by the owners.

== See also ==
- Baglung Municipality
