= Sushil Khadka =

Nepali politician and businessman (born 1986)

- सुशील खड्का

Member of Parliament, Pratinidhi Sabha
- Incumbent
- Assumed office 26 March 2026
- Preceded by: Chitra Bahadur K.C.
- Constituency: Baglung 1

Personal details
- Born: 14 March 1986 (age 40) Baglung, Baglung District, Nepal
- Party: Rastriya Swatantra Party
- Spouse: Shilshila Acharya

Sushil Khadka (Note: Nepali: सुशील खड्का) (born 14 March 1986) is a Nepali politician and businessman who is serving as a member of the House of Representatives for the constituency of Baglung 1 since 2026 from the Rastriya Swatantra Party. Prior to entering parliament in the 2026 general election, he was a chemical engineer and businessman.

== Early life ==
Sushil Khadka was born in Baglung Municipality-3 Guthi, on 14 March 1986. (Note: He was born on 1 Chaitra 2042 in the Nepali calendar.) His father was a man named Keshav Bahadur Khadka. He completed his education in Beni and Baglung, before pursusing higher education in the United States. Khadka would graduate with a bachelor's degree in engineering and a master's degree in economics and business from Vanderbilt University.

Khadka spent about a decade, from 2005 until 2015, in the United States before returning home to Nepal where he operated a company that recycles non-biodegradable waste with his wife. Khadka also pursued commercial banana farming, under the name Mangala Venture Company, in his family's ancestral land.

== Political career ==
Politically, Khadka's family was close to the Nepali Congress. However, he joined the Rastriya Swatantra Party (RSP) and worked in the party secretariat. He was elected to the House of Representatives from the constituency of Baglung 1 in the 2026 general election, winning 20,927 votes. He won by a margin of 8,983 votes, defeating his nearest rival—Bhim Bahadur Shrees Rana of the Nepali Congress—who only received 11,944 votes.

== Personal life ==
He is married to Shilshila Acharya.

== Electoral history ==
=== 2026 ===
| Candidate | Party | Votes | % |
|---|---|---|---|
| Sushil Khadka | Rastriya Swatantra Party | 20,927 | 44.47 |
| Bhim Bahadur Shrees Rana | Nepali Congress | 11,944 | 25.38 |
| Hira Bahadur Khatri | CPN (UML) | 8,640 | 18.36 |
| Krishna Prasad Sharma Adhikari | Rastriya Janamorcha | 4,521 | 9.61 |
| Others | | 1,029 | 2.19 |
| Total | | 47,061 | 100.00 |
| Majority | | 8,983 | |
| Rastriya Swatantra Party gain | | | |
Source: Election Commission of Nepal
