= Daram Khola-A Hydropower Station =

- Location within Nepal
- Official name: Daram Khola-A Hydropower Project
- Country: Nepal
- Location: Baglung District
- Coordinates: 28.2834°N 83.4185°E
- Purpose: Power
- Status: Operational
- Owner: Sayapatri Hydropower Pvt. Ltd.

Dam and spillways
- Type of dam: Gravity
- Impounds: Daram River

Power Station
- Commission date: 2073-03-12 BS
- Type: Run-of-the-river
- Installed capacity: 2.5 MW

Daram Khola-A Hydropower Station (Nepali: दरम खोला A जलविद्युत आयोजना) is a run-of-the-river hydroelectricity plant located in Baglung District of Nepal. The flow from Daram River is used to generate 2.5 MW electricity.

== Location and hydrology ==
The Daram Khola-A Hydropower Station is on the Daram Khola (Daram River). The catchment area of the intake is 84 square kilometres (32 sq mi). The design discharge is 3.6 cubic metres per second (130 cu ft/s) with a maximum net head of 83.33 metres (273.4 ft). Two other projects on the river were under construction in 2020, the 3 MW mid-Daram A and 4.5 MW mid-Daram B.

The weir of the hydroelectric project is in the Hila and Argal village development committees of the Baglung District. The powerhouse is in Argal VDC on the left bank of the Daram Khola. It can be reached from Baglung Bazar by a 35 kilometres (22 mi) road, of which 20 kilometres (12 mi) is gravel and the rest dirt.

== Technical ==
Headworks structures include a weir across the river, intake, desander, gravel trap, surge tank/forebay and spill-way. From the headworks a 1,768 metres (5,801 ft) penstock pipe with diameter 1.4 metres (4 ft 7 in) carries water to the powerhouse. The surface powerhouse has two horizontal Francis turbines with rated discharge of 1.3 cubic metres per second (46 cu ft/s) feeding synchronous 3-phase generators with rated output of 1350 KW each.

== Construction ==
Design of the project was undertaken by Innovative Engineering Services (IES) of Nepal under contract to Dhaulagiri Civil Electrical Mechanical Engineering. The Initial Environmental Examination report for the project was submitted for approval to the Department of Electricity Development on 23 February 2012. In December 2012 it was reported that construction had begun and was expected to cost Rs. 460 million and to take two years. Commercial production of electricity began on 26 May 2016.

== Finance ==
The plant is owned and developed by Sayapatri Hydropower Pvt. Ltd., an Independent Power Producer of Nepal. The plant started generating electricity from 2073-03-12BS. The generation licence will expire in 2105-02-01 BS, after which the plant will be handed over to the government. The power station is connected to the national grid and the electricity is sold to Nepal Electricity Authority. The company is going to Issue IPO to raise fund . The company has appoint Laxmi capital as issue manager .

== See also ==
- List of power stations in Nepal

== Sources ==
- "Construction of Daramkhola hydroelectricity project begins", Nepal Energy Forum, 2012-12-18
- "Daram khola A Hydroelectric Project", NWRP Nepal Water Resource Portal
- Design of Madhya Daram Khola A Small Hydropower Project (3.0 MW), Innovative Engineering Services (IES), 18 May 2020
- Submission of Daram Khola IEE report, Environmental Services Nepal, 30 July 2020
- "Tara Khola Decoming The 'Hub' Of Hydropower", Investopaper, 5 November 2020
- "दरम खोलामा १७ मेगावाटका ३ जलविद्युत आयोजना निर्माणाधीन (Three 17 MW hydropower projects under construction on Daram River)", UrjaKhabar, 2020-02-05
