= Baglung 2 =

Parliamentary constituency in Nepal

- Parliamentary constituency for the House of Representatives
- Balung 2 in Gandaki Province; Protected areas in green

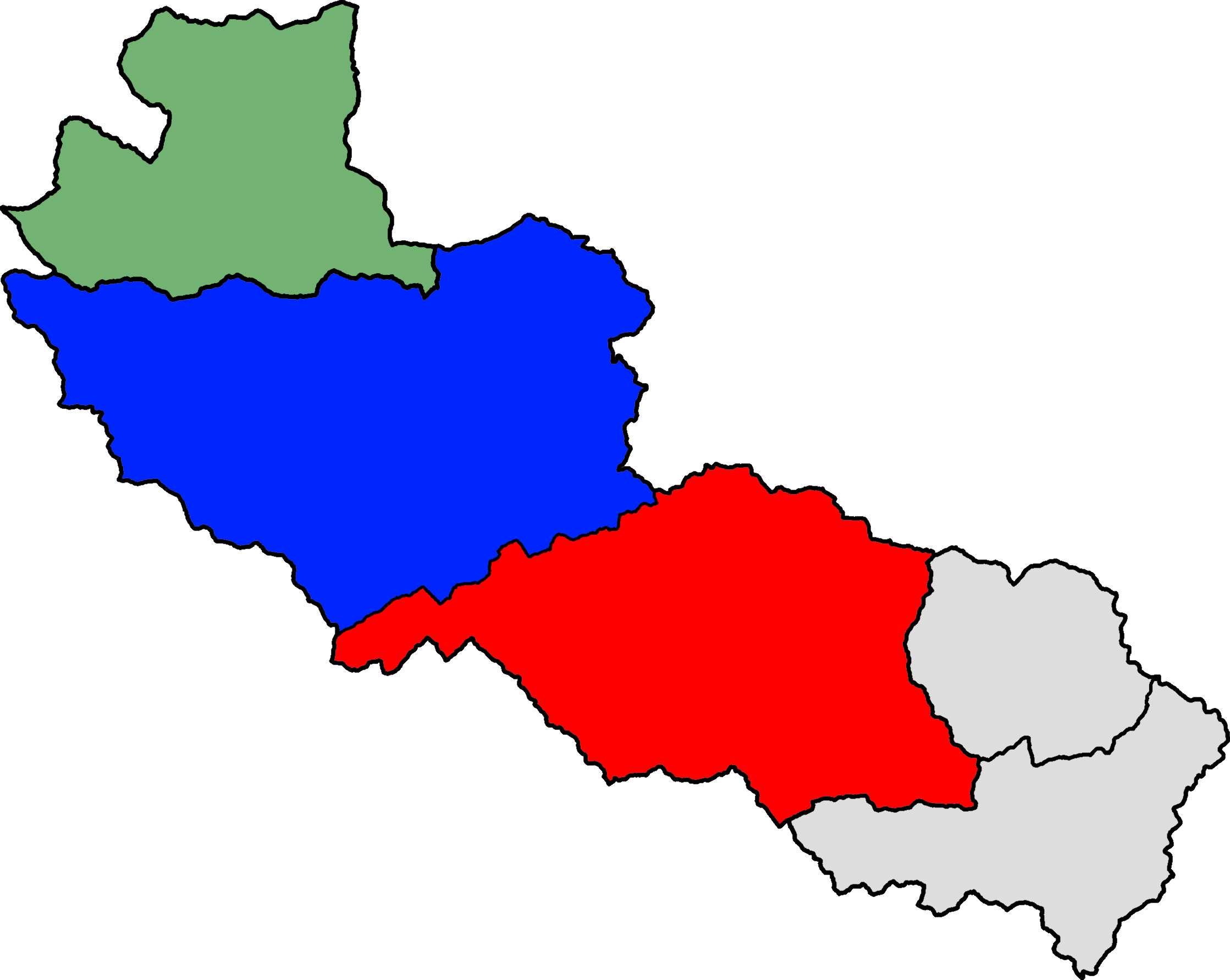
- Assembly segments Baglung 2(A) and Baglung 2(B) within Baglung District; Protected areas in green
- Province: Gandaki Province
- District: Baglung District
- Electorate: 80,526

Current constituency
- Created: 1991
- MP: Som Sharma (RSP)
- Gandaki MPA 2(A): Chandra Bahadur Budha (NCP)
- Gandaki MPA 2(B): Khim Bikram Shahi (RJM)

Baglung 2 one of two parliamentary constituencies of Baglung District in Nepal. This constituency came into existence on the Constituency Delimitation Commission (CDC) report submitted on 31 August 2017.

== Incorporated areas ==
Baglung 2 incorporates Galkot Municipality, Tara Khola Rural Municipality, Badigad Rural Municipality, Taman Khol Rural Municipality, Dhorpatan Municipality, Nisikhola Rural Municipality.

== Assembly segments ==
It encompasses the following Gandaki Provincial Assembly segment

- Baglung 2(A)
- Baglung 2(B)

== Members of Parliament ==
=== Parliament/Constituent Assembly ===
Election	Member	Party
1991	Min Bahadur Khatri	Nepali Congress
1999	Chitra Bahadur K.C.	Rastriya Janamorcha
2013	Prakash Sharma Poudel	Nepali Congress
2017	Devendra Paudel	CPN (Maoist Centre)
May 2018	Devendra Paudel	Nepal Communist Party
March 2021	Devendra Paudel	CPN (Maoist Centre)
2026	Som Sharma	Rastriya Swatantra Party

=== Provincial Assembly ===
==== 2(A) ====
Election	Member	Party
2017	Chandra Bahadur Budha	CPN (Maoist Centre)
May 2018	Chandra Bahadur Budha	Nepal Communist Party

==== 2(B) ====
Election	Member	Party
2017	Tek Bahadur Gharti	Rastriya Janamorcha
2019 by-elections	Khim Bikram Shahi	Rastriya Janamorcha

== Election results ==
=== Election in the 2020s ===
==== 2022 general election ====
Candidate	Party	Votes	%
Som Sharma	Rastriya Swatantra Party	12,647	28.34
Tek Raj Poudel	Nepali Congress	11,868	26.59
Gyamnath Gaire	Nepali Communist Party	10,709	24.00
Manju Sharma	CPN (UML)	7,864	17.62
Harka Bahadur Pun	Shram Sanskriti Party	564	1.26
Others		974	2.18
Total		44,626	100.00
Majority		779	
Rastriya Swatantra Party gain			

==== 2022 general election ====
Candidate	Party	Votes	%
Devendra Paudel	CPN (Maoist Centre)	24,794	51.56
Manju Sharma	CPN (UML)	20,193	41.99
Tila Khatri	Rastriya Swatantra Party	2,327	4.84
Others		776	1.61
Total		48,090	100.00
Majority		4,601	
CPN (Maoist Centre) hold			

==== 2022 provincial election ====
===== 2(A) =====
Candidate	Party	Votes	%
Jeet Bahadur Sherchan	Nepali Congress	15,128	55.73
Prakash Gharti Magar	Independent	12,019	44.27
Total		27,147	100.00
Majority		3,109	
Nepali Congress			

===== 2(B) =====
Candidate	Party	Votes	%
Drona Kumar Kunwar	Nepali Congress	12,421	56.44
Laxman Pun Magar	CPN (UML)	8,680	39.44
Others	905	4.11	
Total		22,006	100.00
Majority		3,741	
Nepali Congress			

=== Election in the 2010s ===
==== 2019 by-elections ====
===== 2(B) =====
Party	Candidate	Votes
Rastriya Janamorcha	Khim Bikram Shahi	11,235
Nepali Congress	Jit Bahadu Sherchan	9,138
Others		597
Invalid votes		425
Result	Janamorcha hold	
Source: Election Commission

==== 2017 legislative elections ====
Party	Candidate	Votes
CPN (Maoist Centre)	Devendra Paudel	28,827
Nepali Congress	Nar Bahadur Pun	19,905
Others		1,028
Invalid votes		2,610
Result	Maoist Centre gain	
Source: Election Commission

==== 2017 Nepalese provincial elections ====
===== 2(A) =====
Party	Candidate	Votes
CPN (Maoist Centre)	Chandra Bahadur Budha	17,415
Nepali Congress	Manjesh Bam Malla	11,546
Federal Socialist Forum, Nepal	Bir Bahadur Darji	255
Invalid votes		1,138
Result	Maosit Centre gain	
Source: Election Commission

===== 2(B) =====
Party	Candidate	Votes
Rastriya Janamorcha	Tek Bahadur Gharti	11,884
Nepali Congress	Jit Bahadur Sherchan	8,624
Others		389
Invalid votes		1,140
Result	Janamorcha gain	
Source: Election Commission

==== 2013 Constituent Assembly election ====
Party	Candidate	Votes
Nepali Congress	Prakash Sharma Poudel	10,253
Rastriya Janamorcha	Rajendra Dhungana	8,031
UCPN (Maoist)	Lila Bahadur Thapa Magar	5,854
CPN (Unified Marxist–Leninist)	Surya Prasad Pathak	3,404
Others		1,048
Result	Congress gain	
Source: NepalNews

=== Election in the 2000s ===
==== 2008 Constituent Assembly election ====
Party	Candidate	Votes
Rastriya Janamorcha	Chitra Bahadur K.C.	12,594
Nepali Congress	Mani Bhadra Sharma	11,975
CPN (Unified)	Lila Bahadur Thapa Magar	7,669
CPN (Maoist)	Dhan Prasad Sapkota	7,451
Others		1,760
Invalid votes		1,813
Result	Janamorcha hold	
Source: Election Commission

=== Election in the 1990s ===
==== 1999 legislative elections ====
Party	Candidate	Votes
Rastriya Janamorcha	Chitra Bahadur K.C.	24,124
Nepali Congress	Gopal Prasad Sapkota	15,040
Others		1,102
Invalid Votes		538
Result	Janamorcha gain	
Source: Election Commission

==== 1994 legislative elections ====
Party	Candidate	Votes
Nepali Congress	Min Bahadur Khatri	15,283
Independent	Chitra Bahadur K.C.	15,089
Others		844
Result	Congress hold	
Source: Election Commission

==== 1991 legislative elections ====
Party	Candidate	Votes
Nepali Congress	Min Bahadur Khatri	15,644
Rastriya Prajatantra Party (Thapa)		7,283
Result	Congress gain	

== See also ==
- List of parliamentary constituencies of Nepal
