= Devendra Paudel =

Nepalese politician

The Right Honourable Devendra Poudel
- देवेन्द्र पौडेल

Minister of Education, Science and Technology
- In office 8 October 2021 – 26 December 2022
- President: Bidya Devi Bhandari
- Prime Minister: Sher Bahadur Deuba
- Preceded by: Krishna Gopal Shrestha
- Succeeded by: Shishir Khanal

Member of Parliament, Pratinidhi Sabha
- In office 4 March 2018 – 12 September 2025
- Preceded by: Prakash Sharma Poudel (as Member of the Constituent Assembly)
- Succeeded by: Som Sharma
- Constituency: Baglung 2

Personal details
- Born: 11 January 1965 (age 61) Baglung District
- Party: CPN (Maoist Centre)
- Other political affiliations: CPN (Masal); CPN (Unity Centre); Naya Shakti; Nepal Communist Party (2018-2021)

Devendra Paudel is a Nepalese politician who served as a member of the Pratinidhi Sabha and as the Education Minister of Nepal. He was elected from Baglung-2, Province No. 3. He is a member of CPN (Maoist Centre).
