= Baglung 1 =

Parliamentary constituency in Baglung, Nepal

- Parliamentary constituency for the House of Representatives
- Balung 1 in Gandaki Province; Protected areas in green

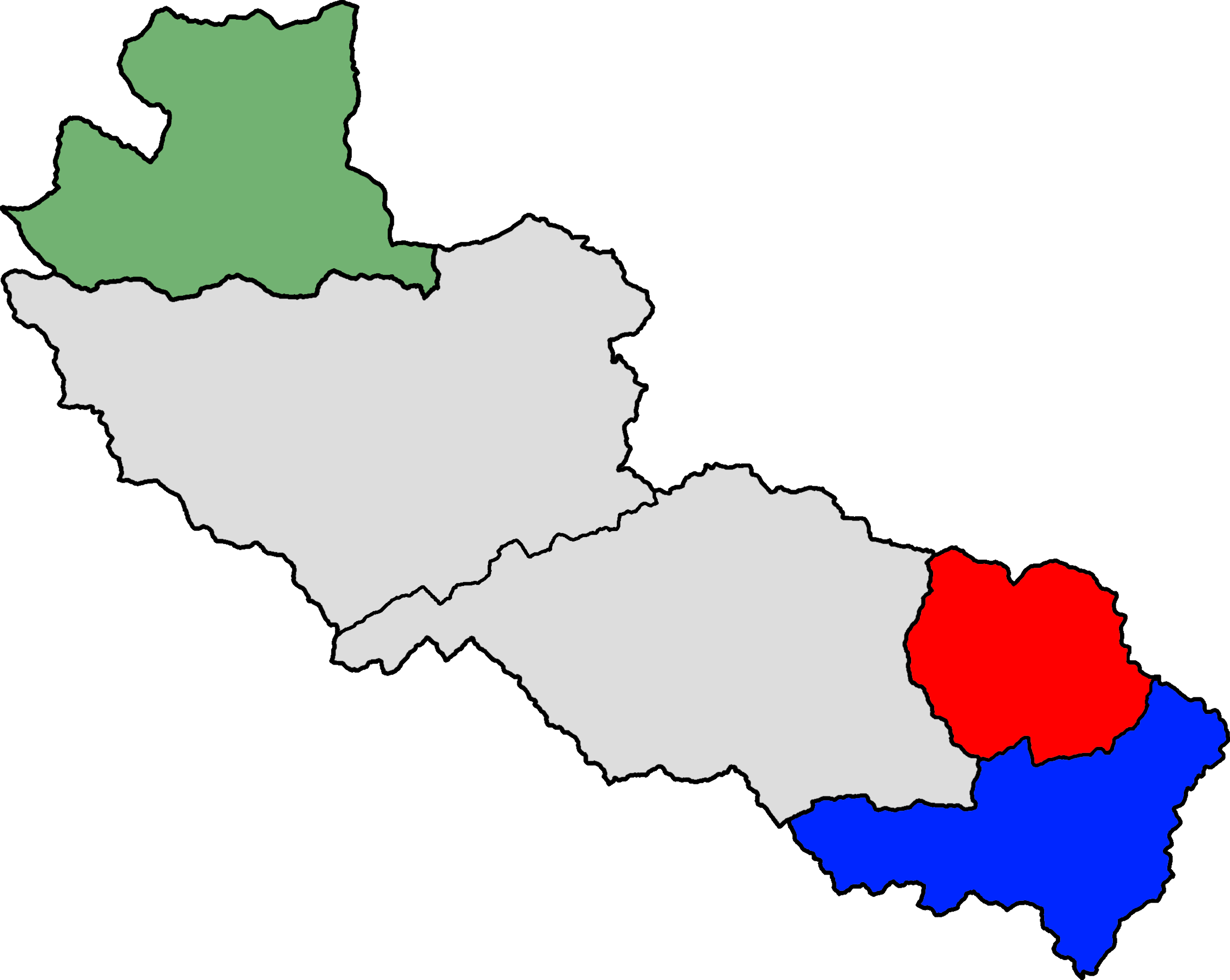
- Assembly segments Baglung 1(A) and Baglung 1(B) within Baglung District; Protected areas in green
- Province: Gandaki Province
- District: Baglung District
- Electorate: 86,756

Current constituency
- Created: 1991
- MP: Sushil Khadka (RSP)
- Gandaki MPA 1(A): Indra Lal Sapkota (NCP)
- Gandaki MPA 1(B): Krishna Thapa (RJM)

Baglung 1 is one of the two parliamentary constituencies of Baglung District in Nepal. This constituency came into existence on the Constituency Delimitation Commission (CDC) report submitted on 31 August 2017.

== Incorporated areas ==
Baglung 1 incorporates Kanthekhola Rural Municipality, Bareng Rural Municipality, Jaimuni Municipality and Baglung Municipality.

== Assembly segments ==
It encompasses the following Gandaki Provincial Assembly segment

- Baglung 1(A)
- Baglung 1(B)

== Members of Parliament ==
=== Parliament/Constituent Assembly ===
Election	Member	Party
1991	Govinda Prasad Sharma	Nepali Congress
1994	Govinda Adhikari	CPN (Unified Marxist–Leninist)
1999	Tanka Prasad Sharma Kadel	Nepali Congress
2008	Ramji Prasad Sharma	CPN (Unified Marxist–Leninist)
2013	Hari Bahadur Khadka	Nepali Congress
2015 by-election	Champa Devi Khadka	Nepali Congress
2017	Surya Prasad Pathak	CPN (Unified Marxist–Leninist)
May 2018	Surya Prasad Pathak	Nepal Communist Party
March 2021	Surya Prasad Pathak	CPN (Unified Marxist–Leninist)
2022	Chitra Bahadur K.C.	Rastriya Janamorcha
2026	Sushil Khadka	Rastriya Swatantra Party

=== Provincial Assembly ===
==== 1(A) ====
Election	Member	Party
2017	Indra Lal Sapkota	CPN (Unified Marxist–Leninist)
May 2018	Indra Lal Sapkota	Nepal Communist Party

==== 1(B) ====
Election	Member	Party
2017	Krishna Thapa	Rastriya Janamorcha

== Election results ==
=== Election in the 2020s ===
==== 2026 general election ====
Candidate	Party	Votes	%
Sushil Khadka	Rastriya Swatantra Party	20,927	44.47
Bhim Bahadur Shrees Rana	Nepali Congress	11,944	25.38
Hira Bahadur Khatri	CPN (UML)	8,640	18.36
Krishna Prasad Sharma Adhikari	Rastriya Janamorcha	4,521	9.61
Others		1,029	2.19
Total		47,061	100.00
Majority		8,983	
Rastriya Swatantra Party gain			

==== 2022 general election ====
Candidate	Party	Votes	%
Chitra Bahadur K.C.	Rastriya Janamorcha	21,464	42.32
Surya Prasad Pathak	CPN (UML)	18,845	37.15
Khimananda Kandel	Rastriya Swatantra Party	9,191	18.12
Others		1,223	2.41
Total		50,723	100.00
Majority		2,619	
Rastriya Janamorcha gain			

==== 2022 provincial election ====
===== 1(A) =====
Candidate	Party	Votes	%
Dipendra Bahadur Thapa	Nepali Congress	13,898	49.24
Hira Bahadur Khatri	CPN (UML)	12,418	44.00
Dilli Prasad Acharya	Rastriya Prajatantra Party	1,451	5.14
Others	456	1.62	
Total		28,223	100.00
Majority		1,480	
Nepali Congress			

===== 1(B) =====
Candidate	Party	Votes	%
Dilli Ram Subedi	Nepali Congress	13,379	62.16
Navaraj Paudel	CPN (UML)	7,259	33.73
Others	885	4.11	
Total		21,523	100.00
Majority		6,120	
Nepali Congress			

=== Election in the 2010s ===
==== 2017 legislative elections ====
Party	Candidate	Votes
CPN (Unified Marxist–Leninist)	Surya Prasad Pathak	33,657
Nepali Congress	Champa Devi Khadka	20,616
Others		663
Invalid votes		1,625
Result	CPN (UML) gain	
Source: Election Commission

==== 2017 Nepalese provincial elections ====
===== 1(A) =====
Party	Candidate	Votes
CPN (Unified Marxist–Leninist)	Indra Lal Sapkota	17,915
Nepali Congress	Dipendra Bahadur Thapa	11,989
Others		336
Invalid votes		524
Result	CPN (UML) gain	
Source: Election Commission

===== 1(B) =====
Party	Candidate	Votes
Rastriya Janamorcha	Krishna Thapa	15,636
Nepali Congress	Prakash Sharma Paudel	9,094
Naya Shakti Party, Nepal	Yunis Miya	310
Invalid votes		583
Result	Janamorcha gain	
Source: Election Commission

==== 2015 by-elections ====
Candidate	Party	Votes	%
Champa Devi Khadka	Nepali Congress	17,154	45.09
Man Kumari K.C.	CPN (UML)	15,068	39.60
Krishna K.C.	UCPN (Maoist)	2,505	6.58
Netra Bahadur Budhathoki	Rastriya Janamorcha	1,949	5.12
Others	1,372	3.61	
Total		38,048	100.00
Valid votes		38,048	100.00
Invalid/blank votes		0	0.00
Total votes		38,048	100.00
Registered voters/turnout		52,202	72.89
Majority		2,086	
Nepali Congress hold			

==== 2013 Constituent Assembly election ====
Party	Candidate	Votes
Nepali Congress	Hari Bahadur Khadka	13,500
CPN (Unified Marxist–Leninist)	Hari Bahadur Khatri	11,963
UCPN (Maoist)	Krishna Bahadur K.C.	6,003
Rastriya Janamorcha	Tirtha Singh Thapa Chhetri	2,159
Others		1,598
Result	Congress gain	
Source: NepalNews

=== Election in the 2000s ===
==== 2008 Constituent Assembly election ====
Party	Candidate	Votes
CPN (Unified Marxist–Leninist)	Ramji Prasad Sharma	15,786
CPN (Maoist)	Chandra Bahadur Budha	14,386
Nepali Congress	Hari Prasad Shrestha	12,017
Rastriya Janamorcha	Amar Bahadur Thapa	2,992
CPN (Marxist–Leninist)	Tilak Bahadur RIjal	1,468
Others		1,120
Invalid votes		1,865
Result	CPN (UML) gain	
Source: Election Commission

=== Election in the 1990s ===
==== 1999 legislative elections ====
Party	Candidate	Votes
Nepali Congress	Tanka Prasad Sharma Kadel	15,467
CPN (Unified Marxist–Leninist)	Ramji Prasad Sharma	15,425
CPN (Marxist–Leninist)	Bishnu Bahadur Bhandari	5,544
Rastriya Prajatantra Party (Chand)	Jabbar Bahadur Lamichhane	1,469
Rastriya Prajatantra Party	Tika Ram Sapkota	1,379
Others		1,729
Invalid Votes		776
Result	Congress gain	
Source: Election Commission

==== 1994 legislative elections ====
Party	Candidate	Votes
CPN (Unified Marxist–Leninist)	Govinda Adhikari	14,937
Nepali Congress	Govinda Prasad Sharma	10,292
Rastriya Prajatantra Party	Chandi Prasad Kandel	3,452
Others		3,726
Result	CPN (UML) gain	
Source: Election Commission

==== 1991 legislative elections ====
Party	Candidate	Votes
Nepali Congress	Govinda Prasad Sharma	13,348
CPN (Unified Marxist–Leninist)		7,346
Result	Congress gain	

== See also ==
- List of parliamentary constituencies of Nepal
