= All Nepal Democratic Youth Association (RJM group) =

All Nepal Democratic Youth Association (Nepali: अखिल नेपाल जनवादी युवा संघ, abbreviated अनेजयु संघ, anejayu sangh) is a political youth movement in Nepal, the youth wing of Rastriya Janamorcha. Kashinath Pokhrel is the president of the organisation.

The organization held its fifth national conference in Butwal in March 2010. The conference was addressed by RJM leader Chitra Bahadur K.C., who warned against implementation of federal model in Nepal.
