= Prakash Sharma Poudel =

Nepali politician

- प्रकाश शर्मा पौडेल

Member of the Constituent Assembly
- In office 21 January 2014 – 14 October 2017
- Preceded by: Chitra Bahadur K.C.
- Succeeded by: Devendra Paudel (as Member of Parliament)
- Constituency: Baglung 2

Personal details
- Party: Nepali Congress

Prakash Sharma Poudel (Nepali: प्रकाश शर्मा पौडेल) is a member of 2nd Nepalese Constituent Assembly. He won Baglung–2 seat in CA assembly, 2013 from Nepali Congress. He was defeated in the December 2017 election.
