= Tanka Prasad Sharma Kadel =

Nepali politician

Tanka Prasad Sharma Kandel

Member of Parliament, Pratinidhi Sabha
- In office 28 April 2006 – 16 January 2008
- Preceded by: Himself (2002)
- Succeeded by: Ramji Prasad Sharma (as Member of the Constituent Assembly)
- Constituency: Baglung 1
- In office 23 June 1999 – 22 May 2002
- Preceded by: Govinda Adhikari
- Succeeded by: Himself (2006)
- Constituency: Baglung 1

Personal details
- Party: Nepali Congress

Tanka Prasad Sharma Kadel is a Nepalese politician. He was elected to the Pratinidhi Sabha in the 1999 election on behalf of the Nepali Congress.
