= Som Sharma =

Nepalese politician

Honourable Som Sharma
- सोम शर्मा

Member of Parliament, Pratinidhi Sabha
- Incumbent
- Assumed office 26 March 2026
- Preceded by: Chitra Bahadur K.C.
- Constituency: Baglung 2

Personal details
- Born: 13 January 1992 (age 34)
- Citizenship: Nepalese
- Party: Rastriya Swatantra Party
- Parent: Nanda Prasad Sharma (father)
- Education: Political Science (MA)
- Alma mater: Tribhuvan University; Ratna Rajya Campus
- Profession: Politician

Som Sharma (Nepali: सोम शर्मा) is a Nepalese politician serving as a member of parliament from the Rastriya Swatantra Party. He is the member of the 7th Pratinidhi Sabha elected from Baglung 2 constituency in 2026 Nepalese General Election securing 12,647 votes and defeating his closest contender Tekraj Paudel of the Nepali Congress. He holds Bachelor's degree in Mass communication from Tribhuvan Universityand Master's in political science from Ratna Rajya Campus.
