= Shilshila Acharya =

Nepalese environmental scientist

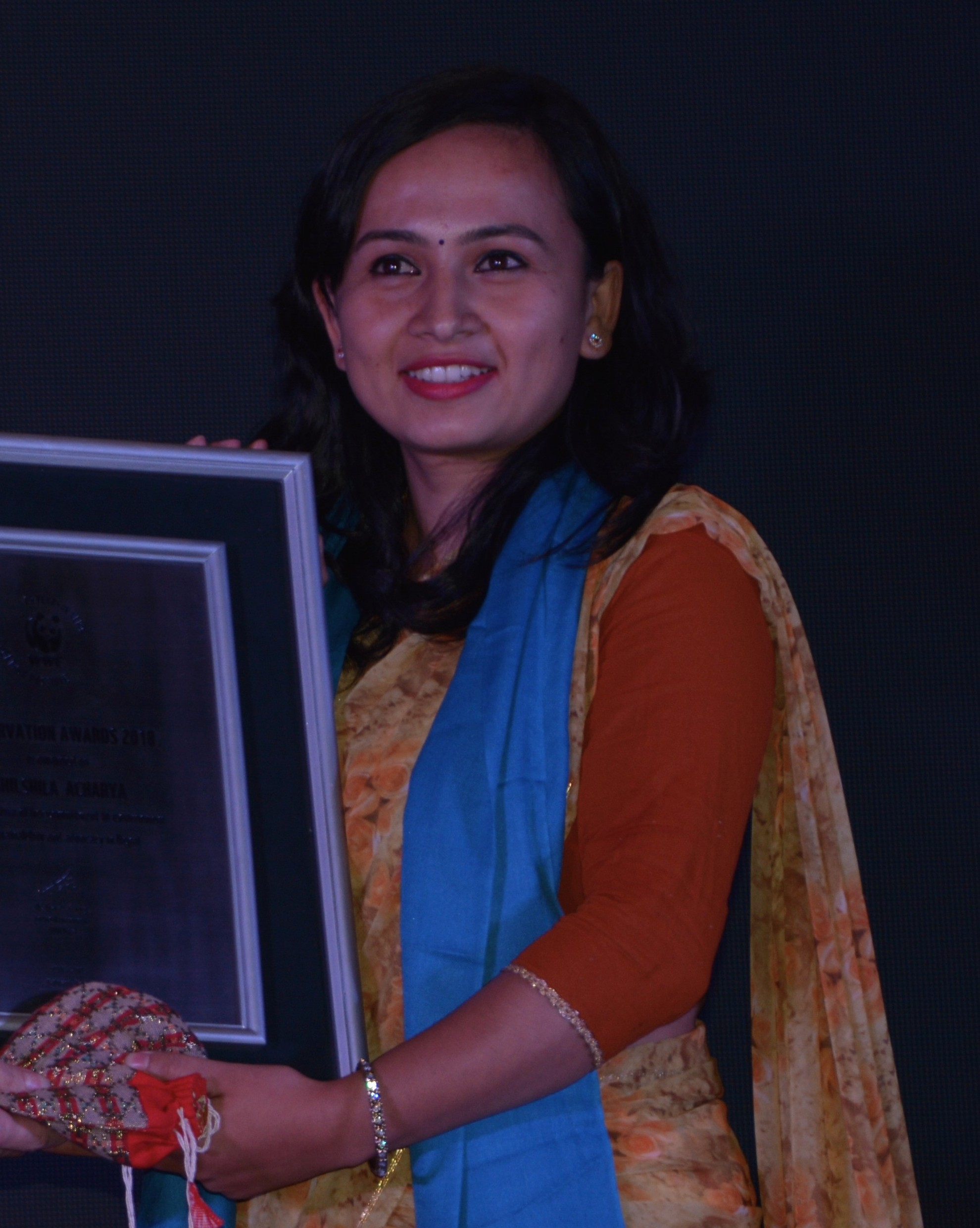
- Born: Baglung
- Education: University of Kathmandu
- Known for: recycling, campaigning

Shilshila Acharya is a Nepalese environmental scientist who led successful campaigns to increase Nepal's plastic recycling. She has reduced her country's use of plastic bags and she has recovered refuse abandoned by visiting mountaineers. In 2024 she joined the BBC's list of 100 inspiring women.

== Life ==
Acharya was born in Baglung. She surprised her family after she won a valuable Bachelor of Medicine, Bachelor of Surgery scholarship that would establish her as a surgeon. She persuaded her family that she would prefer to study environmental science even though the finances made little sense. She would need to pay for her tuition at Kathmandu University as there was no scholarship for environmental science. After graduating she went to Norway to study this time with scholarship supported by Nepal's and Norway's government. She studied biodiversity and environmental science at Tribhuvan University and the University of Bergen and she gained a master's degree.

One of her early campaigns was to suggest the a Nepalese highway should have trees planted beside it.

In 2014, she joined the Himalayan Climate Initiative as it began a move to reduce the use of plastic bags in Nepal although this was not the initial idea. Her group wanted to reduce the number of girls who were trafficked abroad. Her group joined a partnership with Bhat-Bhateni Supermarket, a large supermarket chain, to encourage the use of cloth bags instead of disposable plastic bags. The cloth bags were very popular. People bought them, but they didn't use them. The group needed to find a new way to influence people. Their new campaign's slogan was "No Thanks, I Carry My Own Bag" and this changed behaviour. It led the Nepalese government to ban the use of plastic bags in Kathmandu.

In 2018 the World Wildlife Fund in Nepal celebrated its 25th anniversary and they decided to reconstitute their Conservation awards. Acharya received one of the awards, given to individuals, because of her work as the CEO of the Himalayan Climate Initiative.

In 2019 she was involved in a campaign to reduce the large amount of refuse left in the Himalayas by visiting mountaineers. Her campaign resulted in nearly 120 tonnes of rubbish being removed.

In 2024 she was chosen to join the BBC's list of 100 inspiring women.
