= Surya Prasad Pathak =

Nepalese politician

Surya Pathak

Member of Parliament, Pratinidhi Sabha
- In office 4 March 2018 – 18 September 2022
- Preceded by: Champa Devi Khadka (as Member of the Constituent Assembly)
- Succeeded by: Chitra Bahadur K.C.
- Constituency: Baglung 1

Personal details
- Born: 6 January 1976 (age 50)
- Party: CPN (UML)

Surya Prasad Pathak is a Nepalese Politician and serving as the Member Of House Of Representatives (Nepal) elected from Baglung-1, Province No. 4. He is member of the Nepal Communist Party.
