= Daram Khola =

Coordinates: 28°11′15″N 83°16′26″E

Daram Khola is a river in Baglung, Nepal.
