= Jatiya Samata Samaj =

Jatiya Samata Samaj (Nepali: जातीय समता समाज) is a Nepalese Dalit movement, linked to Rastriya Janamorcha. Rajesh B.K. is the president of the organisation.
