= Rastriya Janamorcha =

Political party in Nepal

National People's Front राष्ट्रिय जनमोर्चा
- Chairman: Chitra Bahadur K.C.
- Vice-president: Janakraj Sharma; Durga Paudel
- General secretary: Manoj Bhatta
- Secretary: Him Lal Puri
- Treasurer: Madhu Chhetri
- Founded: 1999 (original); 2006 (reestablished)
- Split from: Janamorcha Nepal
- Headquarters: Budhanilkantha-12, Jyotinagar, Kapan, Kathmandu
- Student wing: All Nepal National Independent Students Union (Sixth)
- Youth wing: All Nepal Democratic Youth Association
- Women's wing: All Nepal Women's Association
- Ideology: Communism; Marxism–Leninism; Maoism; Anti-federalism
- Political position: Left-wing to far-left
- National affiliation: Communist Party of Nepal (Masal)
- ECN Status: Limited National Party
- Seats in House of Representatives: 0 / 275
- Seats in National Assembly: 1 / 59
- Seats in Lumbini Provincial Assembly: 1 / 87
- Mayors/Chairs: 4 / 753
- Councillors: 159 / 35,011

Election symbol
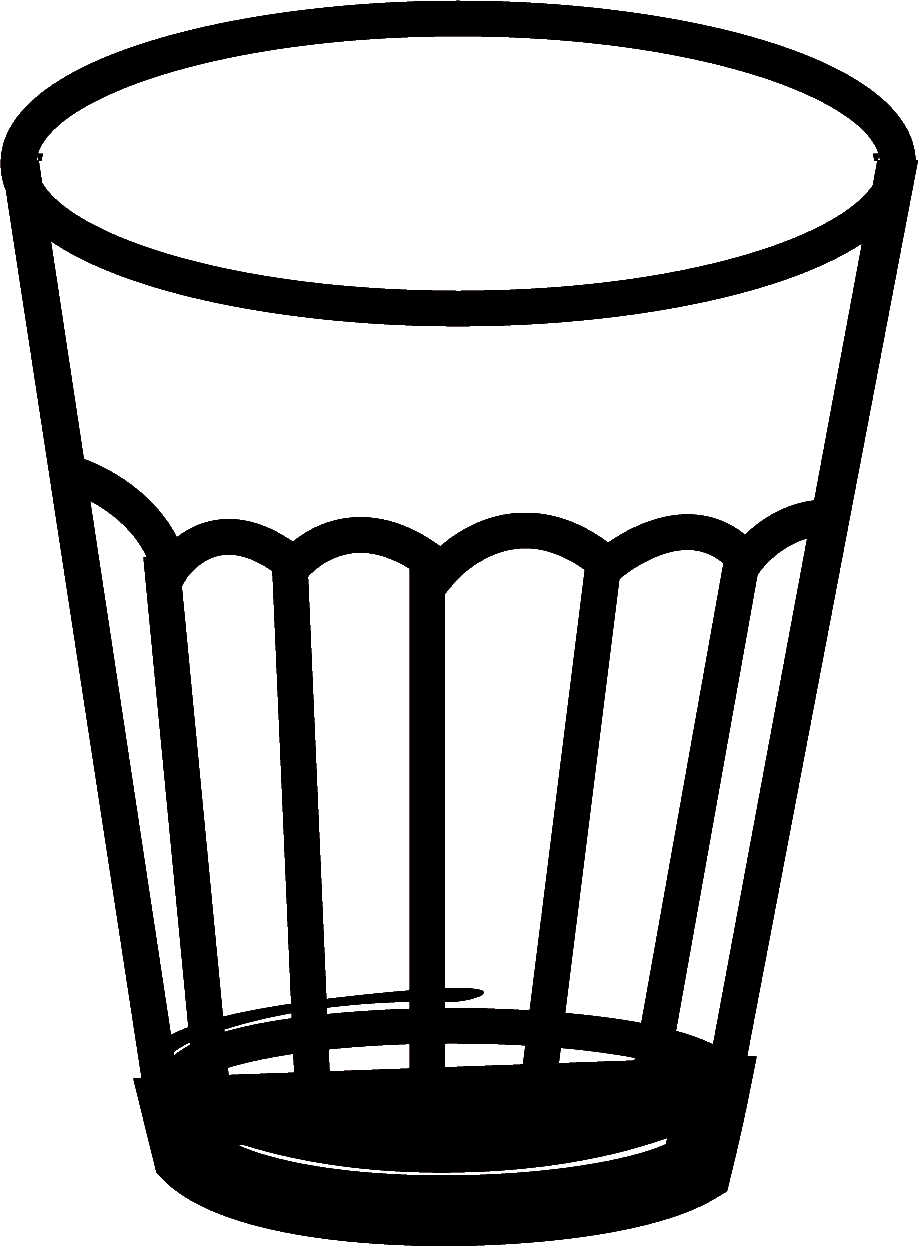

The Rastriya Janamorcha (Nepali: राष्ट्रिय जनमोर्चा, lit. 'National People's Front') is a political party in Nepal. It was originally founded in 1995 as the legal front of Communist Party of Nepal (Masal). Former Deputy Prime Minister, Chitra Bahdur KC is the chairman of the party.

It was re-founded again in 2006 after breaking away from Janamorcha Nepal and still acts as the legal front for the Mohan Bikram Singh led Communist Party of Nepal (Masal). The party remains as a strong political force mainly in Baglung and Pyuthan district.

The party advocates decentralization within the former unitary system.

== History ==
=== Before formation (1991–1994) ===
The party contested the 1991 local elections as All Nepal Peasants Organization and contested in the 1994 legislative elections as All Nepal Rastriya Janamorcha.

=== Merger and break away (2002–2008) ===
In 2002, the party merged with Samyukta Janamorcha Nepal the legal front of Communist Party of Nepal (Unity Centre) to form Janamorcha Nepal. Janamorcha Nepal acted as the legal front of the Communist Party of Nepal (Unity Centre-Masal). After Janamorcha Nepal joined the governing Seven Party Alliance in 2006, Chitra Bahadur KC broke away from the party to reclaim the name of Rastriya Janamorcha. The party held three seats in the Interim Legislature Parliament of Nepal.

=== Constituent Assembly (2008–2015) ===
The party registered at the Election Commission of Nepal ahead of the 2008 Constituent Assembly elections. The party won four seats in the election.

In July 2010, the party expelled its General secretary Dilaram Acharya for breaking party discipline. He formed another party, Rastriya Janamorcha (Nepal) after his expulsion. The party won three seats in the 2013 Constituent Assembly election.

=== Federal Nepal (2015–present) ===
After the promulgation of the Constitution of Nepal, Rastriya Janamorcha joined the coalition government of Communist Party of Nepal (Unified Marxist-Leninist) and Unified Communist Party of Nepal (Maoist). This was the first time that the party had not been in opposition. Following this, party Chairman Chitra Bahadur KC was appointed Deputy Prime Minister and Minister for Cooperatives and Poverty Alleviation.

The party contested the 2017 Nepalese local elections and won 186 seats in local government. The party won mayoral posts in Bareng Rural Municipality in Baglung, Jhimruk and Malarani Rural Municipalities in Pyuthan. Ahead of the 2017 legislative and provincial elections, the party joined the alliance of Communist Party of Nepal (Unified Marxist-Leninist) and Communist Party of Nepal (Maoist Centre). The party won one seat to the Federal Parliament of Nepal but did not cross the three percent threshold to become a national party. The party also won three seats in the Provincial Assembly of Gandaki Province and one seat in the Provincial Assembly of Lumbini Province.

After the Nepalese political crisis in 2021, Rastriya Janamorcha stood in support of alliance led by Nepali Congress. It played major role in forming new government in Gandaki Province. It gave external support and confidence to central government led by Sher Bahadur Deuba. The party was given a seat in National Assembly and hence Tul Prasad B.K. was elected as first National Assemblian from the party.

== Electoral performance ==
=== Legislative elections ===
Election	Leader	Constituency votes			Party list votes			Seats		Position	Status
Election	Leader	No.	%	% change	No.	%	% change	No.	+/-	Position	Status
1999	Chitra Bahadur KC	121,394	1.41					5 / 205		5th	In opposition
2008	Chitra Bahadur KC	93,578	0.91	▼0.50	106,224	0.99		4 / 575	▼1	▼12th	In opposition
2013	Chitra Bahadur KC	66,666	0.74	▼0.17	92,387	0.98	▼0.01	3 / 575	▼1	12th	In opposition
2017	Chitra Bahadur KC	70,014	0.70	▼0.04	62,133	0.65 (Note: Represented as Independent for not reaching the 3% threshold)	▼0.33	1 / 275	▼2	▲10th	In opposition
2022	Chitra Bahadur KC	57,278	0.55	▼0.15	46,504	0.44	▼0.21	1 / 275	Steady	▼12th	In opposition
2026	Chitra Bahadur KC	24,793	0.24	▼0.31	29,456	0.27	▼0.17	0 / 275	▼1	▼13th	Extra parliamentary

=== Provincial elections ===
==== Gandaki ====
Election	Party list votes			Seats		Position	Resulting government
Election	#	%	% change	#	+/-	Position	Resulting government
2017	19,376	2.03		3 / 60		4th	In opposition
2022	14,940	1.52	▼0.51	0 / 60	▼3	▼7th	Extra-parliamentary

==== Lumbini ====
Election	Party list votes			Seats		Position	Resulting government
Election	#	%	% change	#	+/-	Position	Resulting government
2017	32,546	2.02		1 / 87		6th	In opposition
2022	32,647	1.73	▼0.29	1 / 87	Steady	▼10th	In opposition

== Leadership ==
=== Chairmen ===
- Chitra Bahadur K.C., 1999–2002 and 2006–present

=== General secretaries ===
- Nawaraj Subedi, 1999–2002
- Dilaram Acharya, 2006–2010
- Santa Bahadur Nepali, 2011–2016
- Janakraj Sharma, 2016–2021
- Manoj Bhatta, 2021–present

== List of Members of Parliament ==
List of Rastriya Sabha members from Rastriya Janamorcha
No.	Name	Province	Quota	Appointment date	Retirement date
1.	Tul Prasad B.K.	Lumbini	Dalit	January 2021	January 2027

List of Pratinidhi Sabha members from Rastriya Janamorcha

No.	Name	Constituency	Appointment date
1.	Chitra Bahadur K.C.	Baglung 1	2022

== Youth wing ==
ANNISU (Sixth) flag

The All Nepal National Independent Students Union (Sixth) (Nepali: अखिल (छैठौं)) is a student organisation in Nepal. It is the student wing of the Rastriya Janamorcha. As of 2009, the organization had branches in 59 of the 75 districts of Nepal.

== Sister organisations ==
- All Nepal Trade Union Congress
- All Nepal Women's Association
- ANNISU (6th)
- All Nepal Janatati Conference
- Jatiya Samata Samaj
- All Nepal Democratic Youth Association
- Raktim Sanskritik Pariwar
- Akhil Nepal Buddhijibi Sangh
- All Nepal Teachers' Association

== See also ==
- List of political parties in Nepal
