= Communist Party of Nepal (Masal) (2006) =

- General Secretary: Mohan Bikram Singh
- Founded: 2006
- Ideology: Communism; Marxism-Leninism
- National affiliation: Rastriya Janamorcha
- International affiliation: ICOR

Communist Party of Nepal (Masal) (Nepali: नेपाल कम्युनिष्ट पार्टी (मसाल)), initially known as Communist Party of Nepal (Unity Centre-Masal) (नेपाल कम्युनिष्ट पार्टी (एकताकेन्द्र–मसाल)), is an underground communist party in Nepal, which emerged in 2006 through a split in Communist Party of Nepal (Unity Centre-Masal). In March 2007, the party held a 7th Party Congress (counting the congresses of Communist Party of Nepal, Communist Party of Nepal (Fourth Convention), Communist Party of Nepal (Masal) and CPN(UC-M) as theirs). The congress reelected Mohan Bikram Singh as general secretary. Moreover, the congress removed 'Unity Centre' from the party name.

The legal mass front of the party is the Rashtriya Jana Morcha.

== See also ==
- List of communist parties in Nepal
