= Hari Bahadur Khadka =

Nepali politician

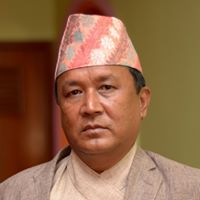

Member of the Constituent Assembly
- In office 21 January 2014 – 7 December 2014
- Preceded by: Ramji Prasad Sharma
- Succeeded by: Champa Devi Khadka
- Constituency: Baglung 1

Personal details
- Born: 1963
- Died: 7 December 2014 (aged 50–51)
- Party: Nepali Congress

Hari Bahadur Khadka (Nepali: हरि बहादुर खड्का) was a member of 2nd Nepalese Constituent Assembly. He won Baglung–1 seat in CA assembly, 2013 from Nepali Congress. He died on 7 December 2014 at Neuro Hospital in Kathmandu after succumbing to injuries sustained in a jeep accident at Bhakunde, Baglung, four days earlier. He had been travelling to Piunpata VDC to attend a religious function.
