= Chitra Bahadur K.C. =

Nepali politician

Honourable Chitra Bahadur K.C.
- चित्रबहादुर के.सी.
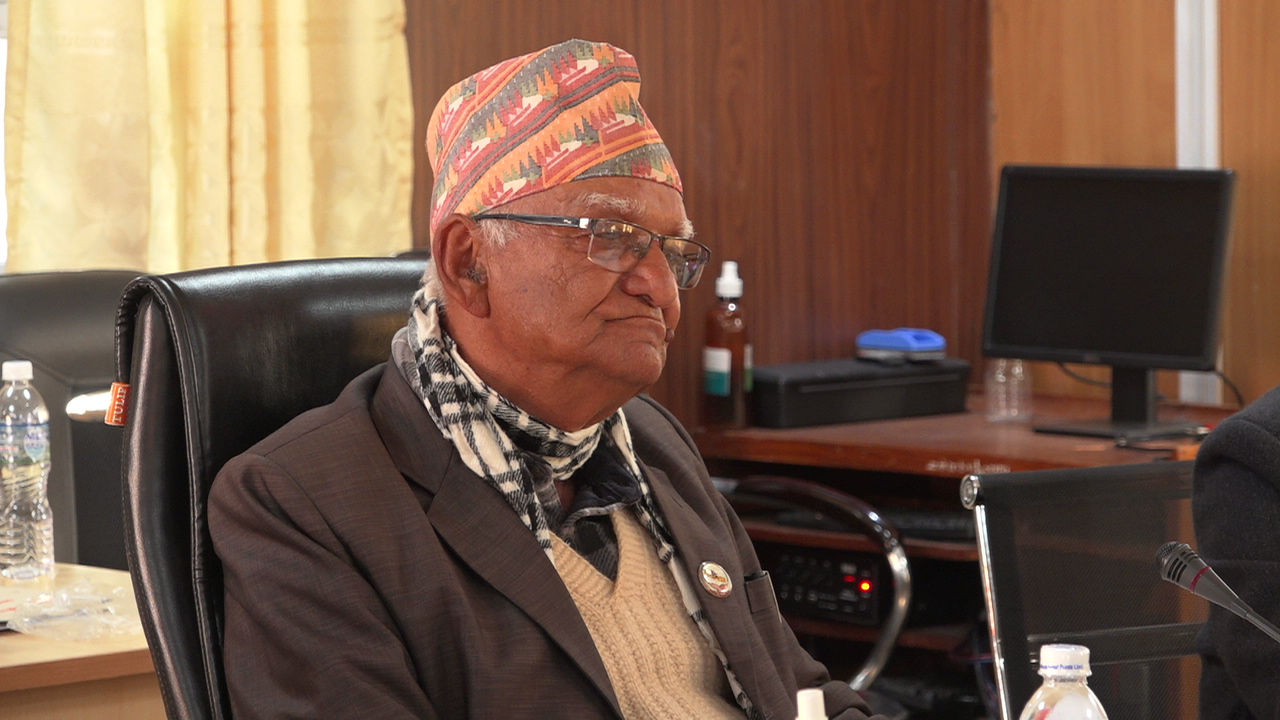

Member of Parliament, Pratinidhi Sabha
- In office 22 December 2022 – 12 September 2025
- Preceded by: Surya Prasad Pathak
- Succeeded by: Sushil Khadka
- Constituency: Baglung 1
- In office 28 April 2006 – 16 January 2008
- Preceded by: Himself (2002)
- Succeeded by: Himself (as Member of the Constituent Assembly)
- Constituency: Baglung 2
- In office 23 June 1999 – 22 May 2002
- Preceded by: Min Bahadur Khatri
- Succeeded by: Himself (2006)
- Constituency: Baglung 2

Member of the Constituent Assembly / Legislature Parliament
- In office 21 January 2014 – 14 October 2017
- Constituency: Party list (Rastriya Janamorcha)
- In office 28 May 2008 – 28 May 2012
- Preceded by: Himself (as Member of Parliament)
- Succeeded by: Prakash Sharma Poudel
- Constituency: Baglung 2

Personal details
- Born: 2 February 1941 (age 85) Nepal
- Party: Rastriya Janamorcha

Chitra Bahadur K.C. (Nepali: चित्रबहादुर के.सी.) is a Nepalese politician and former deputy prime minister and minister of poverty alleviation of Nepal. He is current chairman of the Rastriya Janamorcha (राष्ट्रिय जनमाेर्चा).

Chitra Bahadur K.C. belonged to the Communist Party of Nepal (Fourth Convention). In the 1983 he sided with Mohan Bikram Singh, and joined the Communist Party of Nepal (Masal). Chitra Bahadur K.C. contested the Baglung-2 constituency in the 1994 election. He finished second, with 15089 votes. He was elected to the Pratinidhi Sabha in the 1999 election, as a candidate of Rashtriya Jana Morcha (the electoral front of the Communist Party of Nepal (Masal) (2006)) in the constituency of Baglung-2 with 24124 votes.

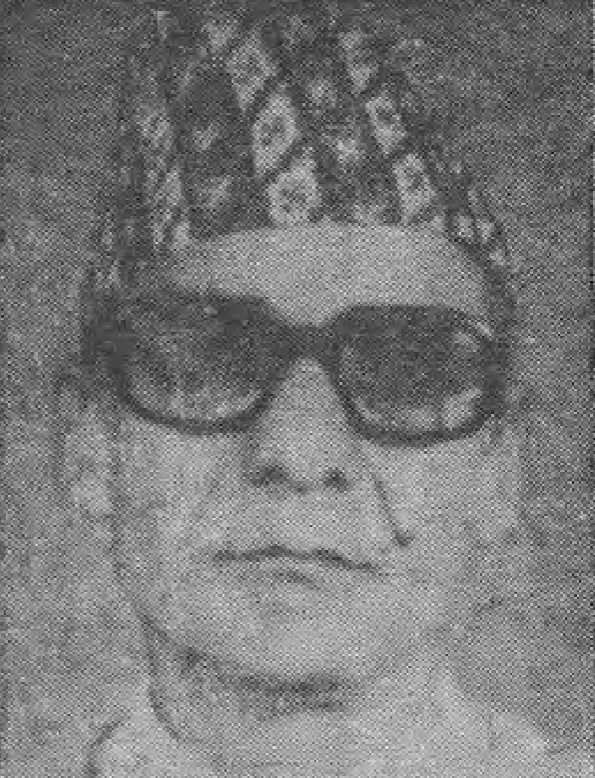
K.C. in 1993

When Janamorcha Nepal was formed in 2002 through the merger of RJM and Samyukta Janamorcha Nepal, Chitra Bahadur K.C. became a member of JMN. When JMN split in 2006, he sided with Communist Party of Nepal (Unity Centre-Masal) (the parent party of JMN) general secretary Mohan Bikram Singh in rejecting participation the Seven Party Alliance government. Effectively JMN was split. A conference of the JMN led by Chitra Bahadur K.C. was held in Butwal 25–26 May 2006, in which he was elected chairman of this JMN faction. The Chitra Bahadur K.C.-led JMN was renamed as the Rashtriya Jana Morcha in 2007.

Chitra Bahadur K.C. won the Baglung-2 seat in the 2008 Constituent Assembly election, the sole RJM candidate to win a seat in the First Past the Post system. He got 12594 votes.

Chitra Bahadur K.C. has been a staunch opponent of Federalism, especially Federalism on the basis of ethnic identity.
