= Baglung =

- Municipality; Hill station
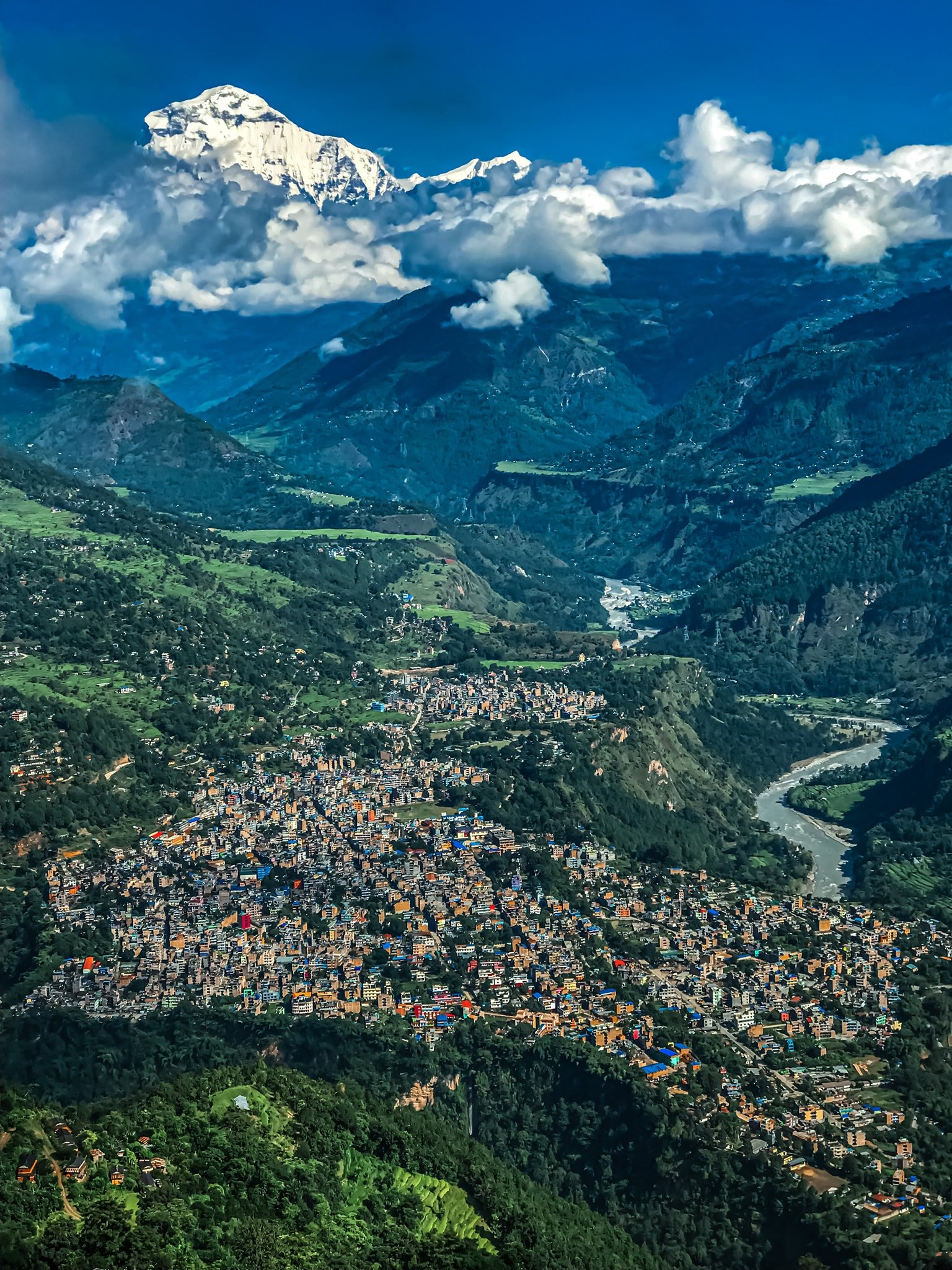
- Baglung Bazar as seen from hill

- Location in Province Baglung (Nepal)
- Coordinates: 28°16′N 83°36′E
- Country: Nepal
- Province: Gandaki Province
- District: Baglung District
- Municipality: Baglung Municipality

Government
  - Mayor: Basanta Kumar Shrestha(Nepali Congress)
  - Deputy Mayor: Raju Khadka (Maoist)

Area
  - Total: 98.01 km^{2} (37.84 sq mi)
- Elevation: 1,020 m (3,350 ft)

Population (2021 census)
  - Total: 56,102
  - Density: 572.4/km^{2} (1,483/sq mi)
  - Ethnicities: Chhetri Magar Newar Bramhin Thakali Dalit
  - Religions: Hindu Buddhist and Hindu-Buddhist Mixed
- Time zone: UTC+5:45 (NST)
- Postal code: 33300
- Area code: 068
- Website: baglungmun.gov.np/en

Baglung is a municipality in Gandaki Province, in western Nepal, 275 km (171 mi) west of Kathmandu. It is the administrative headquarters of Baglung District. Baglung serves as the major center for business, finance, education, service and healthcare for the people of mid-Kali Gandaki valley that encompass Beni, Jaljala, Baglung, Kushma, Kathekhola, Galkot, Phalewas and Jaimuni local bodies. The city is located at the cross-section of Kaligandaki corridor highway and midhill highway that transverse Nepal in north–south and east–west directions respectively.

== Geography and climate ==
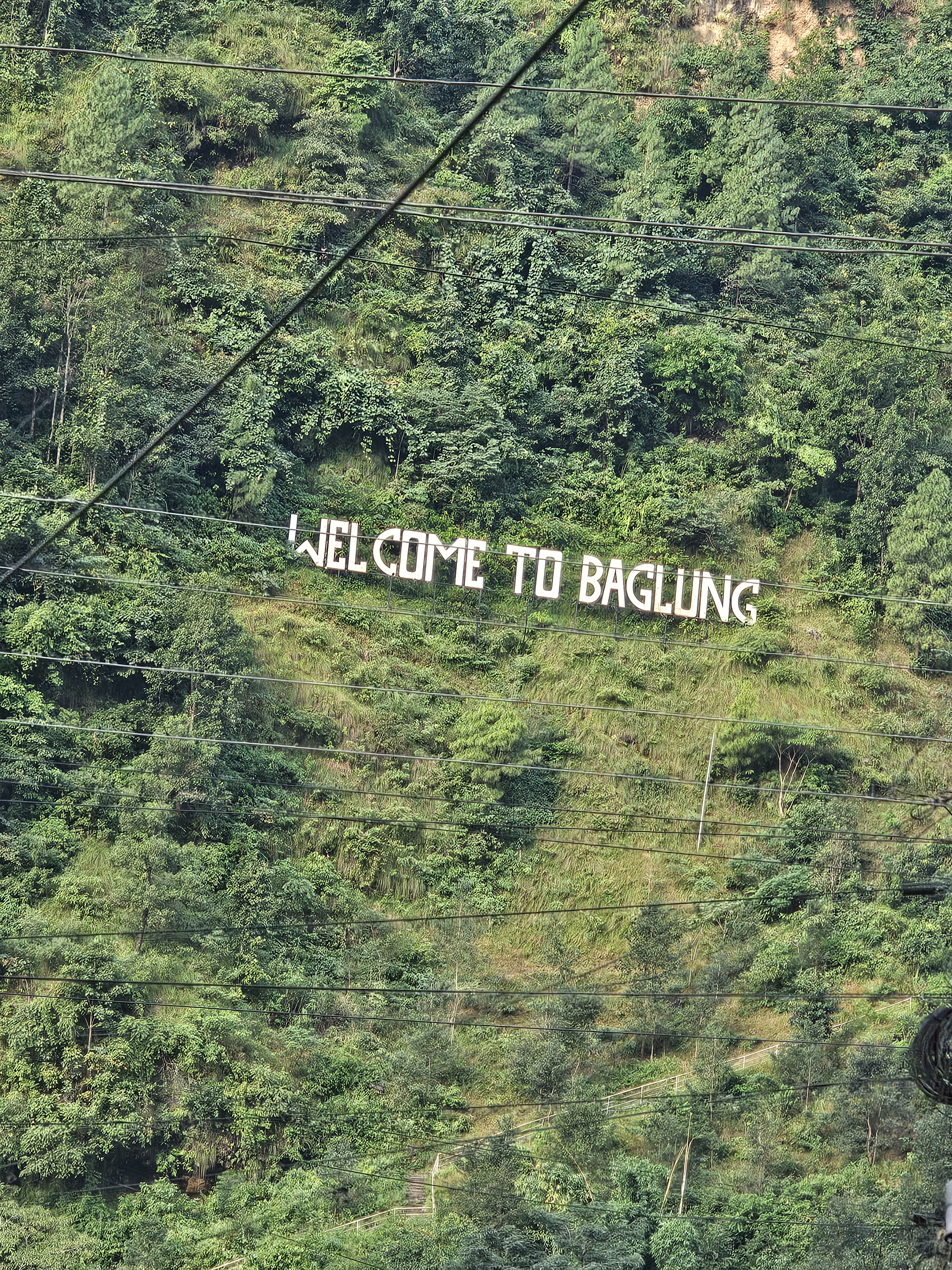
Welcome to Baglung

Baglung Bazar is situated on a plateau overlooking the Kali Gandaki gorge directly south of the Dhaulagiri Himalayan range. Steep cliffs rising from the valley flank the plateau on three sides. City limits are roughly determined by the Theule Khola to the south, Kali Gandaki river to the east and Dhodeni Khola to the north.

Baglung enjoys warm summers and mild winters. Annual average temperatures range from a maximum of 26.6 °C (79.9 °F) and a minimum of 19.1 °C (66.4 °F). Highs above 35 °C (95 °F) and lows below 0 °C (32 °F) are rare. The average annual rainfall recorded is 1,060.9 mm (41.77 in) in 1982. Rainfall is heavily affected by the monsoon and most of it occurs during the months of June through September. Rest of the year is mostly dry and sunny. Snowfall is extremely rare in the city core, however, higher elevations within the city limits see occasional snow during the winter months. Due to large topographic variation climate ranging from hot subtropical to temperate montane climate can be experienced within the city limits.

Climate data for Baglung, elevation 964 m (3,163 ft), (1991–2020 normals)
Month	Jan	Feb	Mar	Apr	May	Jun	Jul	Aug	Sep	Oct	Nov	Dec	Year
Mean daily maximum °C (°F)	20.9 (69.6)	23.3 (73.9)	27.5 (81.5)	30.8 (87.4)	31.5 (88.7)	31.8 (89.2)	31.3 (88.3)	31.1 (88.0)	30.6 (87.1)	28.5 (83.3)	25.6 (78.1)	—	—
Daily mean °C (°F)	13.6 (56.5)	15.9 (60.6)	19.8 (67.6)	23.1 (73.6)	24.8 (76.6)	25.8 (78.4)	26.6 (79.9)	26.5 (79.7)	25.6 (78.1)	22.3 (72.1)	18.6 (65.5)	—	—
Mean daily minimum °C (°F)	6.2 (43.2)	8.4 (47.1)	12.0 (53.6)	15.4 (59.7)	18.1 (64.6)	19.8 (67.6)	21.8 (71.2)	21.8 (71.2)	20.6 (69.1)	16.1 (61.0)	11.5 (52.7)	7.4 (45.3)	14.9 (58.9)
Average precipitation mm (inches)	18.3 (0.72)	25.0 (0.98)	29.8 (1.17)	46.7 (1.84)	139.4 (5.49)	291.7 (11.48)	517.0 (20.35)	443.4 (17.46)	260.1 (10.24)	61.6 (2.43)	16.1 (0.63)	14.3 (0.56)	1,863.4 (73.35)
Source: FAO JICA

== History ==
Pilgrims from India and rest of Nepal traveling to Muktinath and traders seeking to barter grains from the south with salt from Tibet frequented a trade route along the banks of Kaligandaki river since ancient times. However, owing to its location high above the banks of Kaligandaki river and the trade route few actually ventured into the area that is Baglung Bazar today. The area also lacked reliable source of water for drinking and irrigation making it poorly suited for settlement. A lack of evidence of structures and settlements predating 16th century in the area and a lack of mention in historical records predating 16th century support this notion. First confirmed history of settlement in Baglung is found during the reign of King Pratapi Narayan of Parbat (later Galkot) Kingdom in the early 16th century.

In year 1534 AD King Pratapi Narayan of Parbat married daughter of king Manimukunda Sen of Palpa. As the wedding procession reached Baglung, following a dream, the king decided to establish goddess Kalika brought from Palpa at the site. Holder of the goddesses sword Chakra Panwar was given the title of Khadka and asked to stay back as caretaker of the goddess. He was also bestowed with the land that forms Baglung Bazar today. The Magar carriers of the idol were settled in Lung Gau area of Baglung. A temple was built and an annual fair was started during the Chaitre Dashain festival. Descendants of Chakra Panwar Khadka built irrigation channels, pastures, watering holes, fruit gardens and established first establishments in Baglung. Baglung also emerged as an outpost for revenue collection and taxation as the Khadka family also served as local revenue collection officers and militia commanders.

Three hundred years later, following annexation of the Parbat kingdom by Gorkha, Newar traders from Bhaktapur arrived in Baglung and established permanent trading houses and market. During this era Baglung was also proclaimed as a "choti gauda" or district headquarters and official judicial, military, mint and taxation offices were established. Baglung continued to act as administrative headquarters during the Rana regime. After establishment of the current district and zonal system Baglung retained its status as headquarters serving the area.

== Transportation ==
Completion of several road projects have put Baglung at the crossroads of major north–south and east–west highway systems of Nepal. Tracks have been opened for Kaligandaki corridor highway connecting Tibet to the north via Mustang and border towns in the south. Similarly, midhill highway that connects eastern and western halves of Nepal passes through the city. Hari Bahadur Khadka memorial road connects Baglung with Kushmi Sera in the south and also provides access to Balewa airport. Baglung is connected to Beni Bazar of Myagdi to the north and Kusma Bazar of Parbat which are located 13 km (8.1 mi) to the north and 12 km (7.5 mi) to the south-east, respectively. Pokhara Baglung highway connects the town with Pokhara, 72 km (45 mi) to the east. Another important road network connecting Gulmi district in the south originates in Baglung Bazar and passes via Sigana, Gaja and Bareng. Recently under initiative of late member of parliament Hari Bahadur Khadka a road network connecting Baglung Bazar with Bihu that passes through settlements higher in the northern flanks of Kathe Khola valley has been completed. In addition to major highways several narrow seasonal dirt roads connect the town with adjoining rural areas.

Suspension bridges meant for foot traffic are abundant in the area. So much so that the moniker "land of suspension bridges" is used to identify Baglung. Important crossings over Kaligandaki river are located at Pharse, Nirahe, Nayapul and Kaiya. The bridge over Kaligandaki connecting Kaiya with Kushma is notable for having the highest and longest span in Nepal. A mechanical cable-car spans the Kaligandaki river connecting Narayansthan with Kushma. Many other suspension bridges can be found spanning numerous rivers and rivulets within the city limit.

Baglung airport (code: BGL), in Balewa, is located 12 km to the south of the town across the valley from Kusma. With the completion of the Pokhara-Baglung highway this airport has fallen into disuse. Water transportation is virtually absent. However, the adjoining Kali Gandaki river offers some of the best white-water rafting in Nepal and attracts a decent number of thrill seekers every year.

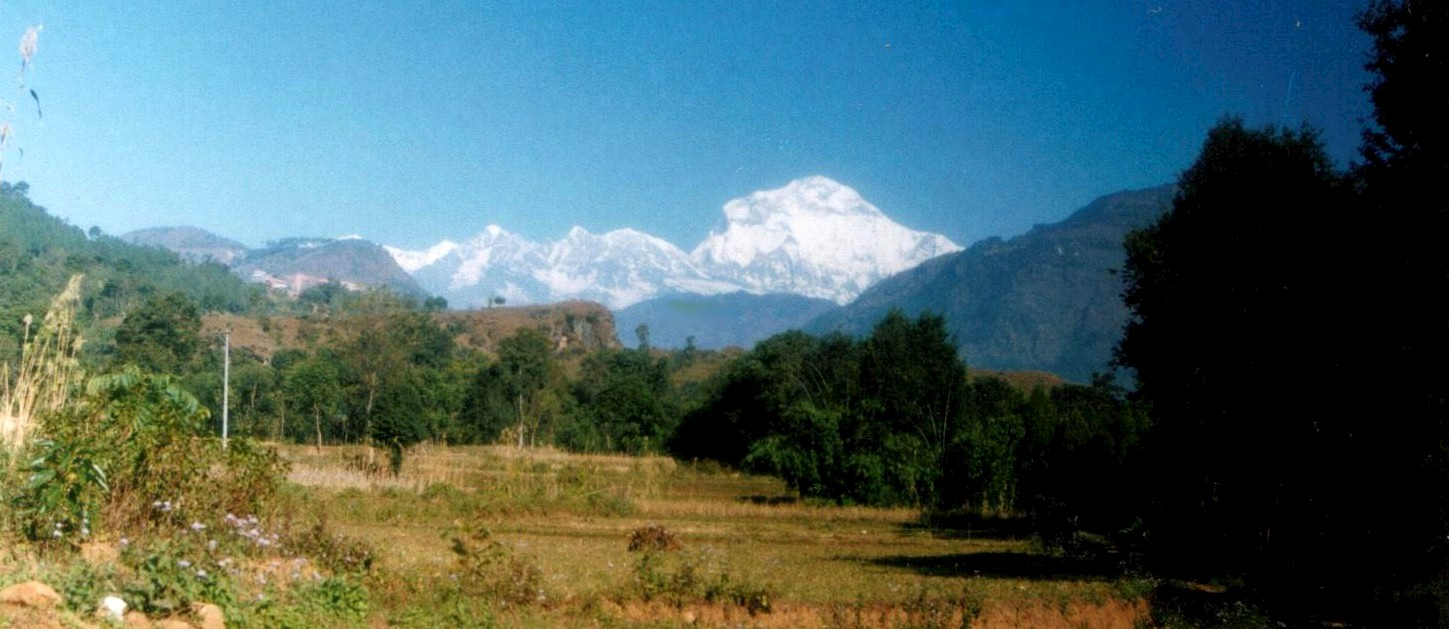
Mt. Dhaulagiri seen from Baglung

== Demographics ==
There are 57,823 inhabitants in Baglung municipality as per the report of the state restructuring committee (2017). Annual population growth rate is 3.03% (Census 2011). Apart from Nepali, other languages spoken include Newari, Gurung, Thakali, Tibetan and Magar.

Baglung is a multicultural and multiracial community. Majority of the population belongs to ethnic communities of Brahmin, Magar, Chhettri, Chhantyal, and Dalits. Smaller groups of Newar, Gurung and Thakali also live in the area. Majority of people from Baglung practice Hinduism. Other religions practiced in the area include Buddhism and Islam. There is also a small Tibetan refugee camp located at Dhorpatan.

At the time of the 2011 Nepal census, Baglung Municipality had a population of 59,270. Of these, 93.6% spoke Nepali, 3.6% Magar, 1.9% Newar, 0.2% Bhojpuri, 0.1% Chantyal, 0.1% Gurung, 0.1% Hindi, 0.1% Maithili, 0.1% Tamang, 0.1% Tharu and 0.1% other languages as their first language.

In terms of ethnicity/caste, 31.6% were Hill Brahmin, 24.6% Chhetri, 15.5% Magar, 10.4% Sarki, 5.1% Kami, 4.7% Damai/Dholi, 3.5% Newar, 1.3% Thakuri, 0.6% Musalman, 0.3% Chhantyal, 0.3% Majhi, 0.3% Tamang, 0.2% Gurung, 0.2% Thakali, 0.1% other Dalit, 0.1% Gaine, 0.1% Kumal, 0.1% Rai, 0.1% Sanyasi/Dasnami, 0.1% Sonar, 0.1% Teli, 0.1% Tharu and 0.2% others.

In terms of religion, 92.9% were Hindu, 5.7% Buddhist, 0.6% Muslim, 0.5% Christian, 0.1% Prakriti and 0.2% others.

In terms of literacy, 79.3% could read and write, 1.7% could only read and 18.9% could neither read nor write.

== Economy ==
Baglung, the erstwhile zonal and district headquarter, has a large presence of government and non-governmental institutions. Administrative as well as service centers are located within the city limits. A number of governmental, non-governmental as well as political conferences and rallies are held throughout the year. There is a significant presence of Nepal Army, Nepal Police and Armed Police Force of Nepal in the area. Baglung is a center for healthcare in the region. Dhaulagiri Zonal Hospital is the major healthcare provider in the region with specialists in many fields of medicine. It is also emerging as a referral hospital for other area hospitals. Hari Khadka Trauma Centre at Dhaulagiri Zonal Hospital is a designated center for immediate care, one of only three in nation, that has recently come into operation. Several private hospitals have come into operation in recent years providing additional healthcare services. Baglung is a Banking and financial hub of the Kaligandaki valley region. Almost all major national banks have branches and regional offices in the city. Financial services are also provided by many co-operatives and finance companies that operate out of the city. Remittance plays a major role in economy of the area. A large number of people are employed overseas and in neighboring India. People from Baglung and nearby also have a tradition of enlisting in the British and the Indian Army. Baglung and the region receive one of the highest amounts of remittance earned from foreign employment in Nepal. As of 2010, pension fund alone distributed to ex-servicemen of the Indian Army by the Pension Paying Office at Baglung stands at around US$20 million. Transportation sector is another major source of employment in Baglung. Many small and medium scale transportation companies provide bus, jeep and freight services to adjoining rural communities and to the major cities in the nation. There are many shops and restaurants catering to the locals and visitors. The town is bustling with many grocery stores, newsstands, repair shops, tailors, beauty parlors, clothing and electronics outlets. There are few small scale industries. Most of the manufacturing work is limited to production of construction materials and home furnishings. Schools and institutions of higher education also employ a significant number of people.

== Places of interest ==
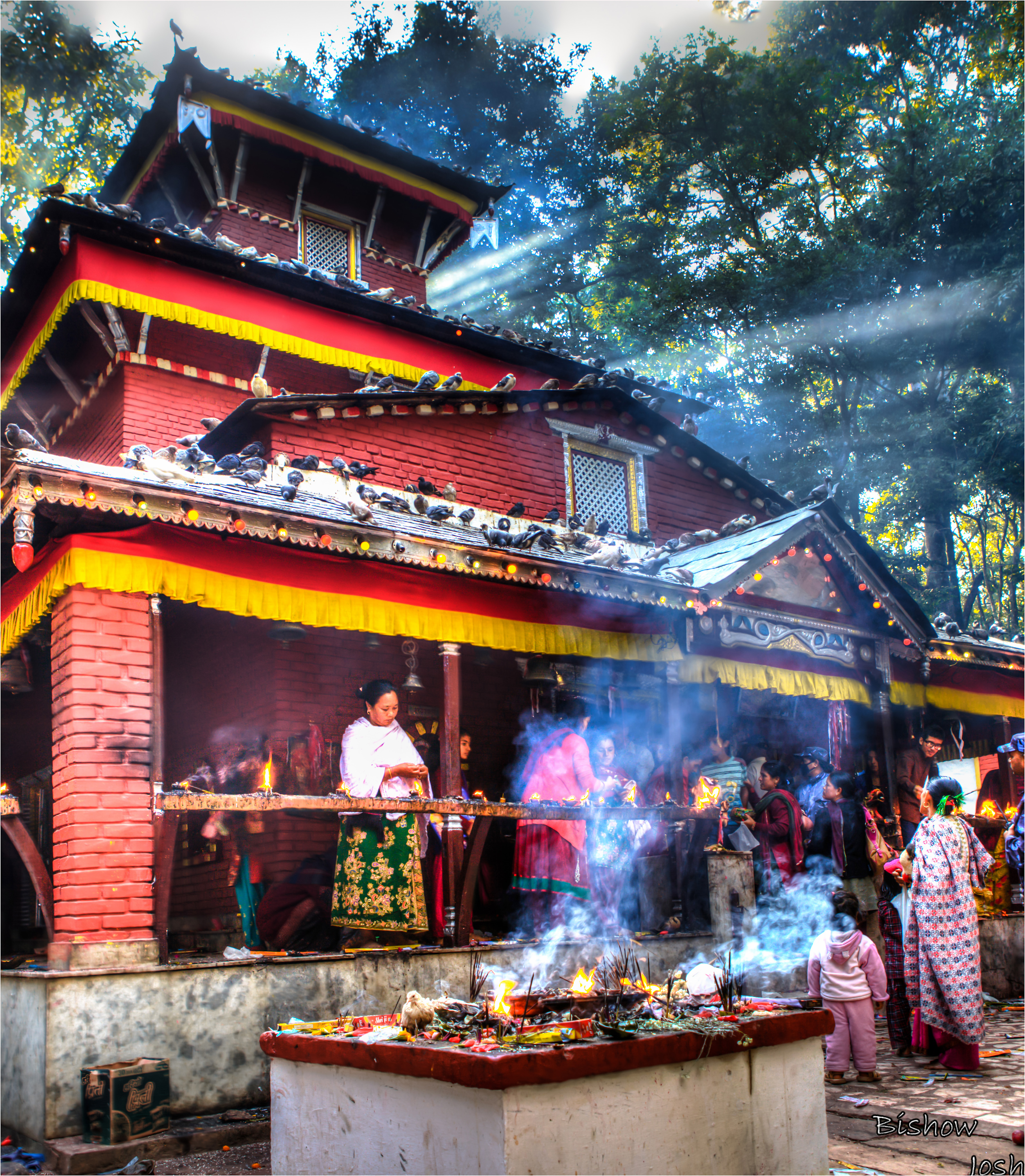
Baglung kalika temple

Views of Himalayas can be had from Baglung. Bhakunde and Panchakot are sites for views of the Dhaulagiri and Annapurna ranges. Terraced fields, waterfalls, forests, deep gorges and caves are abundant throughout the area. The terrain is suitable for trekking, biking, and rafting make Baglung a location for thrill seekers. Baglung also served as a starting point for trekkers to Mustang, Dolpa and Mt. Dhaulagiri in the past. However, with expansion of road networks Baglung now mostly serves as a staging point for travelers to these areas. Dhorpatan Hunting Reserve, the only hunting reserve in Nepal and a habitat for blue sheep and snow leopard, also falls within district boundaries. Recent surge in interest in the hunting reserve, Putha himalaya range, round Dhaulagiri trekking and "Guerrilla trek" have once again placed Baglung on tourist maps. Several tall suspension bridges can be found in the area. One of them, the highest in Nepal, connects Balewa within southern boundaries of the city with Kushma over the Kaligandaki river. A second shorter bridge spans Kathekhola river and connects Tityang with the city core.

Several temples in and around Baglung are pilgrimage sites. Most famous of all religious sites in Baglung, is the Kaliaka Bhagawati Temple, which is visited by thousands of pilgrims each year. An annual fair, one of the largest in Nepal, is held during the Chaitre Dashain festival. Panchakot is being developed under patronage of Shree Muktinath Baba Kamalnayanacharya as a center for pilgrimage and religious education. Balewa Bhairavsthan is an ancient temple perched atop a mountain ridge that is frequented by devotees on Tuesdays. Balaji temple Kundule, Gaurighat, Niraheghat, Khaniyaghat, Malika and Maikuti are other sites visited by pilgrims.

== Culture ==
Baglung and its adjacent areas are well known for the folk Nepali music. The area has given rise to some of the prominent names in folk music. Annual Folk song competition held during the Chaite Dashain festival attracts artists from all over the nation. In recent years music by artists such as The Sky Band, S K Shrestha, Bikash Sharma and Godhuli Band have gained mainstream success.

== Media ==
Several FM radio stations operate in the city. Dhaulagiri Television, a cable based provider of local news and entertainment, is based in the city. Several daily, weekly, biweekly and monthly newspapers, journals and periodicals are published by various entities in the city.

== 2015 Nepal earthquake ==
The town took a shaking during earthquake on 25 April 2015. However, tremors were moderate and the town sustained little damage during the earthquake.
